= Anglo-German Friendship Committee =

The Anglo-German Friendship Committee was a London-based association founded in 1905 to promote the improvement of cordial relations between Great Britain and Germany.

The Committee was launched on 1 December 1905 at a meeting in Caxton Hall, London. Its principal founders were the banker and politician Lord Avebury and the politician Lord Courtney. The pacifist Baroness Bertha von Suttner, who was awarded the Nobel Peace Prize in the same month, was also involved. F. W. Fox became the honorary secretary. The committee's establishment was welcomed by prominent German-Americans, who sent a telegram of support to the inaugural meeting. The German ambassador in London and the British ambassador in Berlin both also expressed their approval.

== See also ==
- All Peoples' Association
- Anglo-German Fellowship, which existed 1935–1939
- Deutsch-Englische Gesellschaft, the German sister organisation of the Anglo-German Fellowship
- Germany–United Kingdom relations
