= Kensington Treaty =

2025 treaty between the United Kingdom and Germany

Friendship and Bilateral Cooperation Treaty
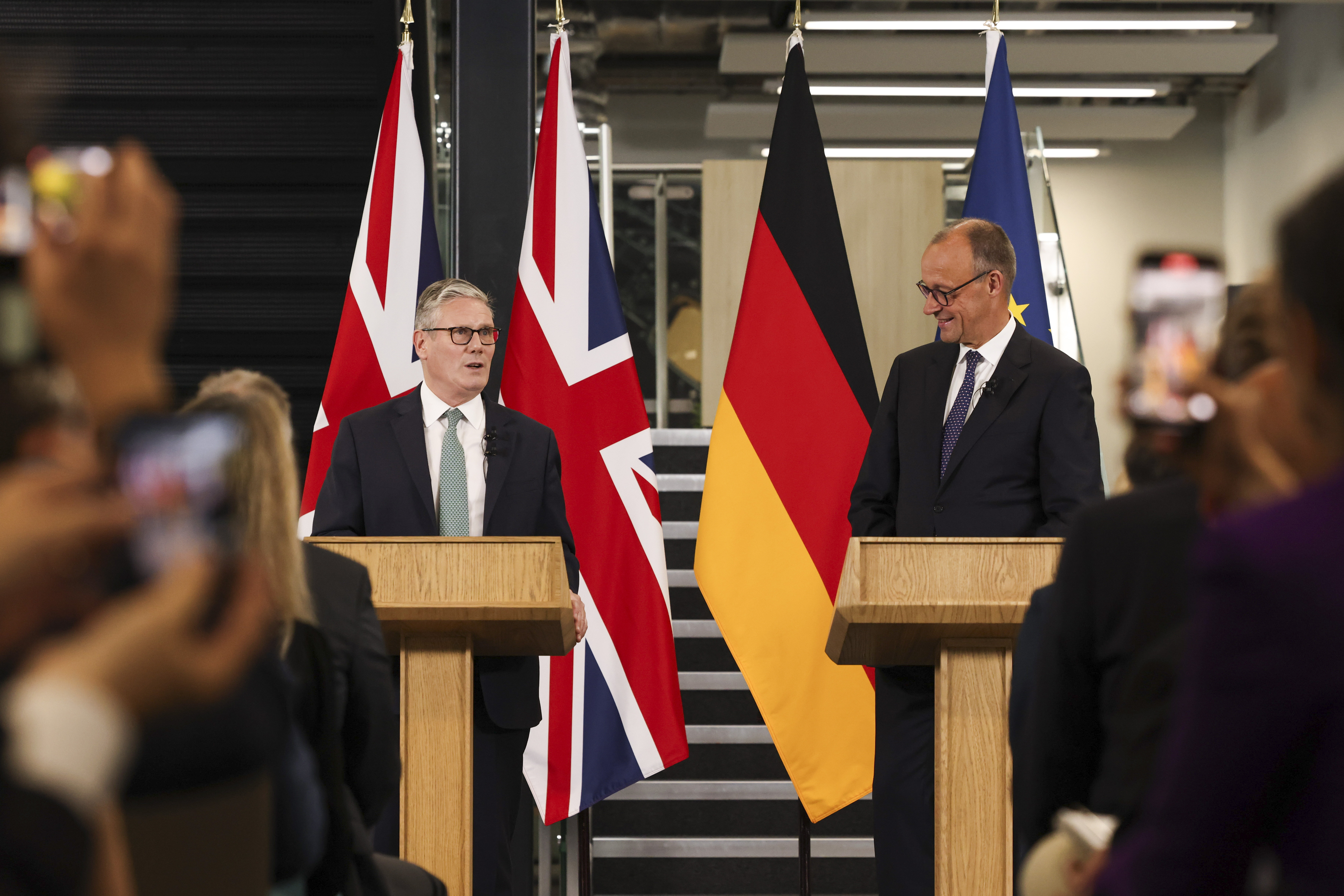
- Starmer (left) and Merz (right) visit Airbus in Stevenage on 17 July 2025.
- Signed: 17 July 2025
- Location: Victoria and Albert Museum, London
- Ratified: 8 October 2026
- Effective: 8 October 2026
- Signatories: Heads of government: (Germany) Friedrich Merz; (United Kingdom) Keir Starmer; Foreign ministers: (Germany) Johann Wadephul; (United Kingdom) David Lammy
- Parties: Germany; United Kingdom
- Languages: English; German

The Kensington Treaty, officially the Treaty between the United Kingdom of Great Britain and Northern Ireland and the Federal Republic of Germany on Friendship and Bilateral Cooperation, is an agreement signed between the governments of the United Kingdom and Germany. The agreement was officially signed by Prime Minister Keir Starmer and Chancellor Friedrich Merz in London on 17 July 2025.

The agreement includes a mutual defence commitment under which the countries will assist one another, including by military means, in the event of an armed attack. It also provides for wider co-operation on defence and security including the countries' response to the Russo-Ukrainian War, and the use of technology in warfare and domestically. It also focuses on ease of travel between the two countries, with measures including British passport holders being able to use German e-gates, school exchange trips between the two countries not requiring visas, and a direct rail service between the two countries within ten years.

The agreement was the first of its kind between the two countries since the end of the Second World War. Media reaction to the treaty noted its significance, especially as part of the prominence of the E3 alliance (the UK, France, and Germany) in the current global situation. Merz told reporters that his visit to the UK coming straight after one by French President Emmanuel Macron was purposeful, and that the treaty was part of the three countries' political positions becoming better aligned.

== History ==
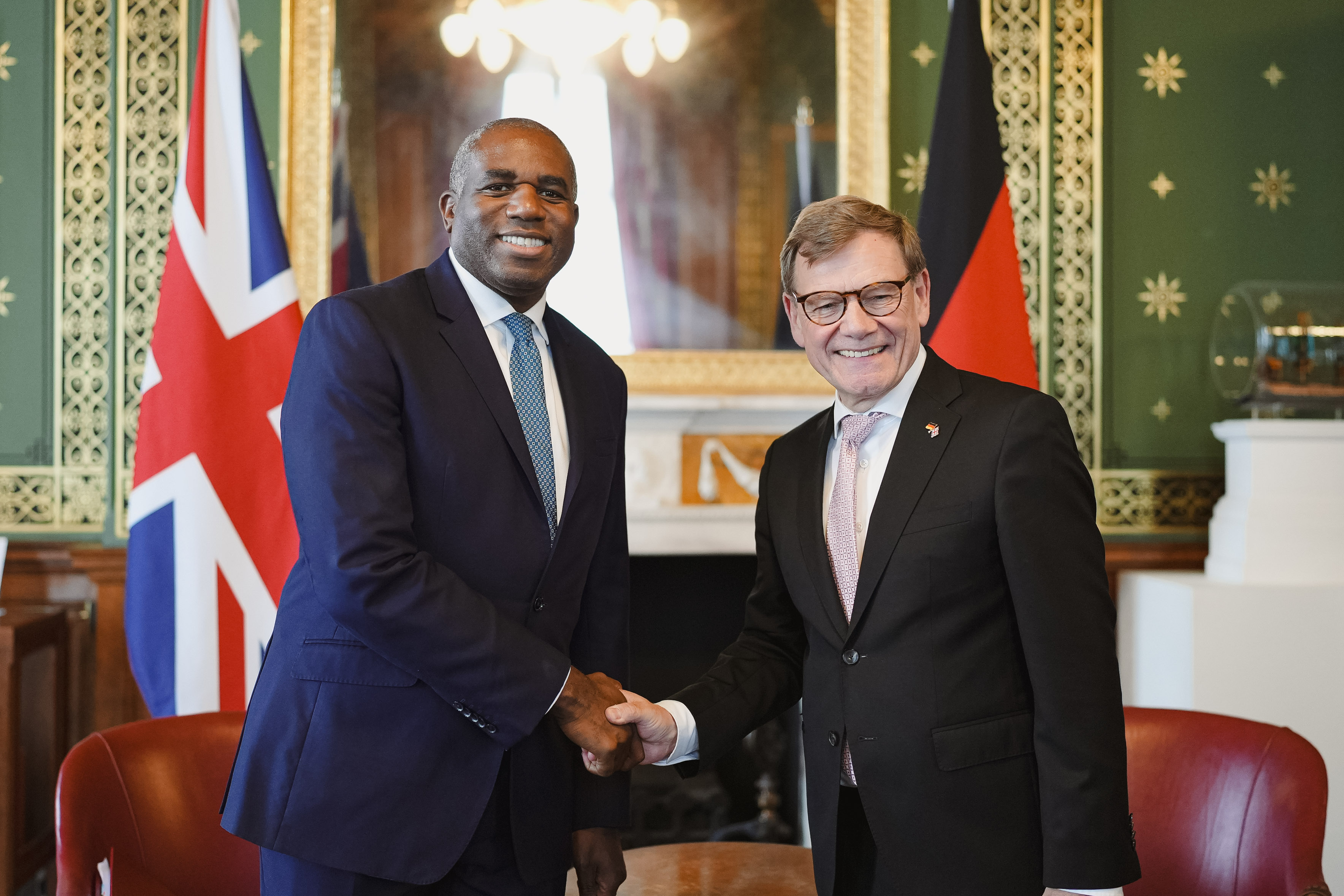
Foreign ministers David Lammy (left) and Johann Wadephul (right) meet in London on the day of the signing

By the early 2020s, the UK–Germany relationship had waned, partially due to Brexit. Whereas the UK was Germany's third-largest trading partner in 2016, in the 2021 German federal election, the UK dropped out of the list of Germany's top ten trading partners entirely in 2022. By September 2024, only 1% of Germans voted the UK as their most important trade partner.

On 23 October 2024, the contemporaneous British and German defence ministers, John Healey and Boris Pistorius respectively, signed the Trinity House Agreement in London in order to strengthen the countries' shared defence interests as part of an "endeavour to enhance the interoperability, interchangeability, and integration of their armed forces". Planning for this treaty had begun before Labour's return to government, with Sir Keir Starmer and Olaf Scholz beginning to progress the bilateral relationship before the former was in office. The 2022 Russian invasion of Ukraine was also a key catalyst for a closer UK–Germany defence relationship.

The Kensington Treaty builds on the agreements of the Trinity House Agreements in regards to the two countries' involvement in the Russo-Ukrainian War. British–German defence collaboration was also expanded upon in May 2025 with the two countries agreeing to develop precision weaponry together. On 17 July 2025, the German chancellor Friedrich Merz travelled with the German foreign secretary Johann Wadephul to London to meet the British prime minister Sir Keir Starmer, to sign the new treaty, and to hold further talks. It marked the Chancellor's first official visit to the United Kingdom during his premiership. However, much of the treaty had been negotiated by the previous German administration during the premiership of Olaf Scholz.

The deal itself was signed at the Victoria and Albert Museum in Kensington, the museum's location being the namesake of the treaty; the location was chosen to reflect the historic link between the two countries (Queen Victoria was British and Prince Albert was German). As well as Starmer and Merz, the treaty was also signed by foreign secretaries David Lammy and Johann Wadephul. After the treaty was signed, Starmer and Merz travelled to 10 Downing Street for further talks, which took place over a shared lunch. It was there that Merz announced that German defence company STARK would open a factory in Swindon, Wiltshire.

Starmer described the treaty as "historic document which really measures just how close our countries are and our ambition for the future", while Merz expressed his surprise that it was the first since the end of World War II, as well as calling the treaty a "historic day for German-British relations". Merz also described the signing of such a treaty as "overdue". Starmer's official spokesperson described action on smuggling gangs as a "significant step", and described it as an "international issue that requires international solutions".

The day after the treaty was signed, Merz had an interview with the BBC in which he said that Germany is "not strong enough, [its] army is not strong enough, so that's the reason why [the German government] are spending a lot of money" and suggested that Europe had been "free-riders" on the defence guarantee of the United States. In respect to implementing the agreements set out in the treaty, he claimed that his government would "do our homework immediately".

On 8 October 2026, Prime Minister Andy Burnham and Chancellor Friedrich Merz exchanged the instruments of ratification in Berlin, bringing the treaty into force. At their meeting, the two governments also announced an Industrial Tech Corridor, a partnership to counter hybrid threats, expanded cooperation on space and quantum technologies, and a UK–Germany Regional Growth Forum as part of the treaty's implementation.

Prime Minister Andy Burnham and German Chancellor Friedrich Merz in Berlin on 8 October 2026, when the treaty entered into force

== Content ==
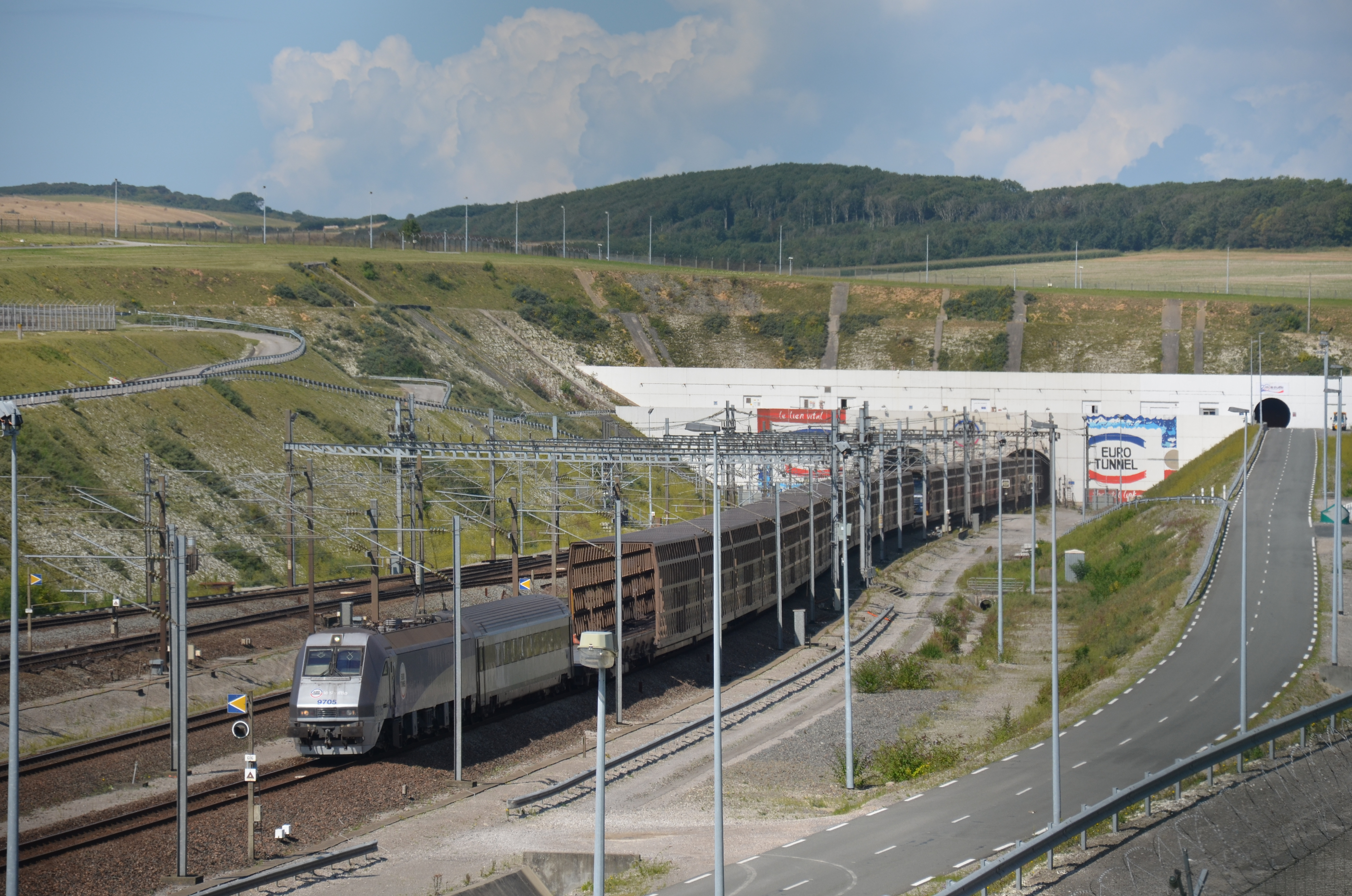
Rail services could begin between London and Germany via the Channel Tunnel within a decade

The treaty included the creation of a 'joint taskforce' to look at the feasibility of a direct rail service between the United Kingdom and Germany, with an aim for services to begin within ten years. According to The Telegraph, likely routes are between London St Pancras and Berlin, Cologne, or Frankfurt. Heidi Alexander, the UK Transport Secretary, cited destinations such as the Berlin Wall, Brandenburg Gate, and Checkpoint Charlie as destinations that Britons would be able to visit "from the comfort of a train". As part of the agreement, UK passport holders will be allowed to use e-gates in Germany, with the policy coming into effect "as soon as technically possible"; this has not been the case since Brexit. Frequent travellers will be the first to be able to use the gates in August 2025, with other travellers able to from October. The policy comes after it was agreed at a UK–EU summit in May 2025 that there was no legal reason preventing UK citizens from doing so.

The treaty reaffirms the countries' obligations under Article 5 of the North Atlantic Treaty. It additionally provides that the United Kingdom and Germany will assist one another, including by military means, in the event of an armed attack on either country.

The treaty included an agreement that Germany would make it illegal to smuggle migrants into the United Kingdom, which was originally agreed with Merz's predecessor Olaf Scholz. It is illegal under EU law to smuggle people between countries within the EU, which has no longer applied to the UK since Brexit. The law, which will be passed by the end of 2025, would allow the German police to crack down on the supply of small boats to gangs for them to cross the English Channel. As part of a wider effort to counter "mobility issues" between the two countries, the agreement also featured an agreement on school exchange visits, wherein students will not need to have a visa in order to take part in a school trip to either country. The new policy, which was set to be rolled out by the end of 2025, was described in the treaty as increasing "opportunities for linguistic, cultural and academic experiences". The details of this programme, which is yet to be implemented, will be published in August 2026.

=== Priority projects ===
As part of article 22 of the treaty, the countries agreed on seventeen projects that were priorities for cooperation on, to be reviewed by a Joint Cabinet every two years. These priorities were:

- The recovery and reconstruction of Ukraine following the Russo-Ukrainian War.
- A bilateral defence partnership based on the Trinity House Agreement.
- Increasing the countries' cooperation on their defence industries and exports.
- Sharing a plan to tackle illegal immigration.
- Beginning a Strategic Science and Technology Partnership between the countries.
- A project to develop infrastructure in the North Sea
- The creation of a new rail link between Germany and the UK.
- Allowing UK passport holders to use German E-gates
- Increasing citizens' mobility, including allowing school groups to visit without visas.
- The creation of a Business–Government Forum between the two countries.
- Collaborating in efforts for world peace and stability.
- Collaborating on efforts for stability in the Balkans.
- Cooperating in efforts to increase security and stability of the Indo–Pacific.
- Increasing security from biological threats.
- Collaborating on developing the countries' economies sustainably.
- Cooperating on issues in relation to education, culture and sport.
- Collaboration between the countries' financial institutions.

== Analysis ==
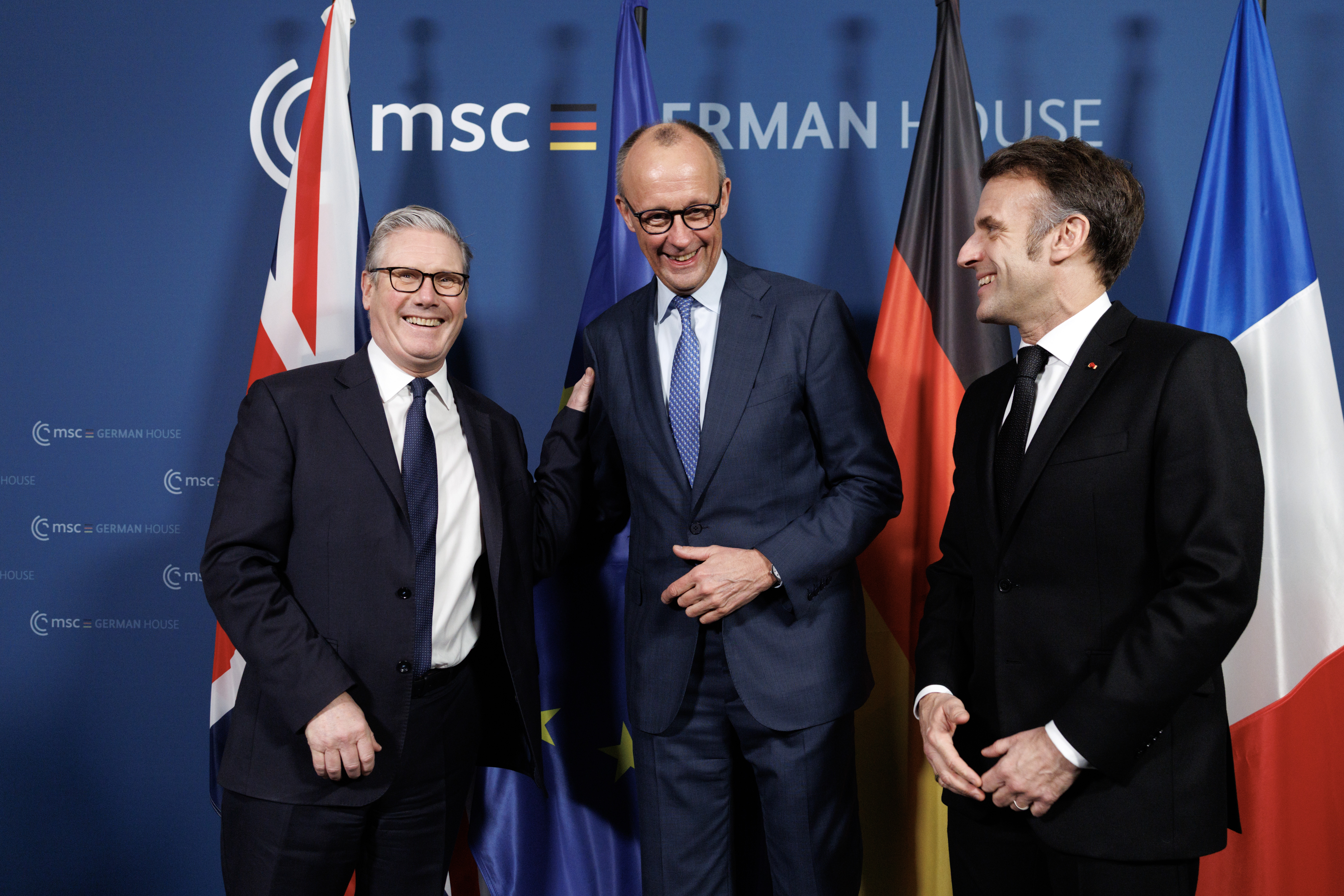
UK Prime Minister Keir Starmer (left), German Chancellor Friedrich Merz (centre), and French President Emmanuel Macron (right) are seen to have reignited the E3 alliance between their countries.

=== Geopolitical intentions ===
Various news sources suggested that the treaty, especially when combined with French President Emmanuel Macron's state visit to the UK on 8–10 July, cemented the return of the E3 alliance of the UK, France, and Germany. This allowed the treaty to fit alongside the 2025 refresh of the Lancaster House Treaties between the UK and France, and the Aachen Treaty between France and Germany. The closer cooperation was viewed in the context of concerns about European security and uncertainty over the United States' reliability as an ally.

Merz said that the proximity of his visit to Macron's was "no coincidence" and that the countries were "converging" on their political positions. The Times interpreted this closer European cooperation in the context of the second Trump administration's approach to Ukraine, and suggested that Germany, which does not possess nuclear weapons of its own, was seeking greater protection from the nuclear capabilities of its European allies. Rob Rider, a strategic adviser at German arms company Rheinmetall, referred to the treaty as a "huge step" in light of the threat to Europe from Russia, particularly as the United States increasingly focused on China.

=== Impact on domestic policy ===
BBC News said that Merz is "comfortable" dealing with foreign policy and had been successful in establishing good relations with Donald Trump; however, they noticed his domestic policy was comparably weaker and that tensions within his coalition could lead to questions around the extent of his political authority. The Guardian frames the agreement in the context of the rising popularity of the Alternative für Deutschland in Germany, with critics of Merz's government citing his failure to create a clear alternative to populism. The Guardian also suggests that Merz sees himself as a "stabilising force" within European politics. Rob Rider of Rheinmetall also wrote that the treaty would help stimulate economic growth in both countries, which is valuable in light of their difficulty achieving much growth in recent years.

Internationale Politik suggested that for both Merz and Starmer, the treaty would allow their respective governments to pursue home policies, especially because of the political pressure they were both under at the time. Deutsche Welle pointed to opinion polls that a majority of Britons were in support of rejoining the European Union to suggest that closer UK–Germany relations would have broad support from the British public. However, they also noted that the UK re-joining the EU was not under consideration. They described the treaty as "highly significant" and the closest the two countries could get without both being members of the EU. According to Süddeutsche Zeitung, the establishment of better connections between the two countries, especially for young people, would help to combat the rise of nationalism and polarisation.

=== Utility of the treaty ===
Internationale Politik argued that the success of the treaty was as dependent on UK–EU relations as it was on UK–Germany relations, and that it "consolidates previous attempts at formalising the [UK–Germany] relationship". Dr Canan Atilgan, the director of the Konrad Adenauer Foundation in the UK and Ireland, wrote that the treaty was a "highly symbolic milestone" with a "relatively broad" scope. In her opinion, the defence portion of the treaty was notable in actually anchoring the treaty in real policy and realising the promised cooperation between the two countries. Professor Amelia Hadfield, the director of the Centre for Britain and Europe and the head of politics and international relations at the University of Surrey, argued that the treaty was designed to consequentially improve wider UK–EU relations. The seventeen priority projects were also viewed by her as positive for British universities.

The Times described the defence section of the treaty as "otiose", because of both countries' membership of NATO, suggesting it was more representative of a "direction of travel" rather than an actual productive element of the agreement. The Week said that the treaty "broadly lives up to" the claims of its ground-breaking nature, but points out that "some of its contents aren't new", such as the mutual defence clause that is already enshrined by NATO. James Rogers, co-founder of the Council on Geostrategy, described the treaty as "remarkably light on substance" compared with the AUKUS agreements. He argued that the UK and Germany should look beyond the traditional E3 format and work towards a stronger European caucus within NATO, identifying Poland, Romania and Norway as central to deterring Russia. Rogers also advocated greater reciprocal defence procurement, noting that while the UK purchases many land-based military systems from Germany, Germany could purchase more British naval and air platforms.

== See also ==
- Aachen Treaty
- EU–UK Trade and Cooperation Agreement
- Foreign relations of Germany
- Foreign relations of the United Kingdom
- Germany–United Kingdom relations
- United Kingdom–European Union relations
- Lancaster House Treaties
- List of treaties
- Trinity House Agreement
