= British-German Society =

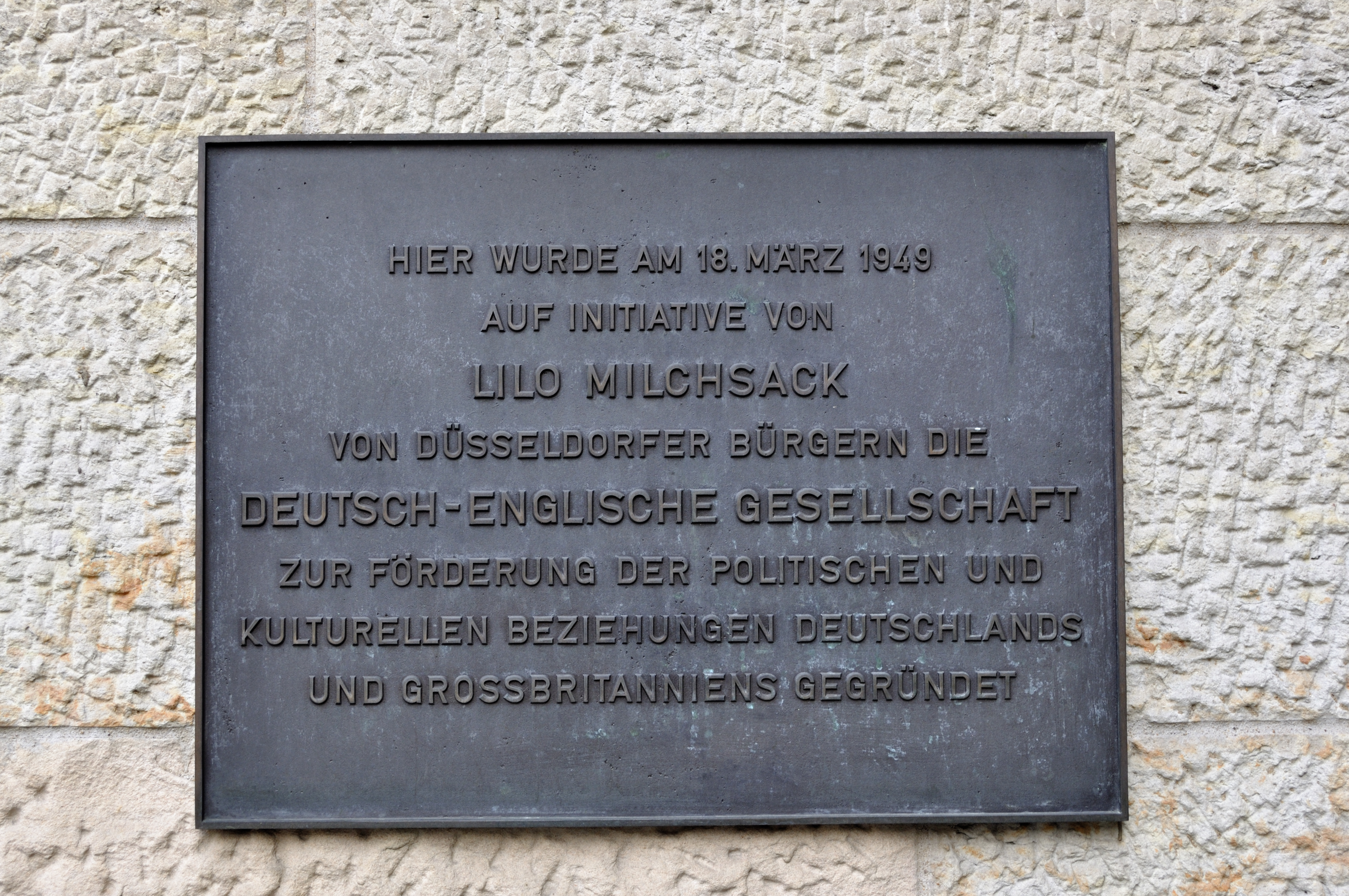
Bronze plaque commemorating the founding of the present-day German-British Society at the Carsch House in the Old Town of Düsseldorf, where the British military government's cultural center “Die Brücke” was located

The German-British Society (German: Deutsch-Britische Gesellschaft; known as the Society for Cultural Exchange with England from 1949 to 1951 and as the German-English Society until 2001) is a registered association of individuals and legal entities whose aim is to promote German-British relations in all areas of public and cultural life through its non-partisan, non-governmental and politically independent work, for example through lectures, exhibitions, excursions and joint dinners. The Society is supported by a network of local and regional member associations of the German-British Society throughout Germany, which design their work and event programs individually. Since 2021, these have also included the Hannoversch-British Society, which cultivates the special historical relations with Britain of the former Electorate and later Kingdom of Hannover in the area of present-day Lower Saxony.

Honorary Presidents were Kurt Biedenkopf, Katharina Focke, Karl-Günther von Hase, Jürgen Ruhfus, Walter Scheel, Helmut Schmidt and Richard von Weizsäcker.

== History ==
The Society has its origins in an association that was founded in Düsseldorf on March 18, 1949 and entered in the register of associations of the Düsseldorf District Court on April 29, 1949 under the name Gesellschaft für kulturellen Austausch mit England e. V. (Society for Cultural Exchange with England), which was renamed the German-English Society in March 1951. The initiative for this came from Lilo Milchsack (1905–1992, CMG, CBE) and other citizens, including Anne Franken, Emil Lehnartz and Georg Muche. The association was intended to help build new relationships with the former enemy, Great Britain. It relied in particular on the support of Sir Robert Birley, Educational Adviser to the Allied Control Council in the British occupation zone from spring 1947 to August 1949. The first “German-English Talks” were held as early as 1950 at Milchsack's private residence in Wittlaer, near Düsseldorf. These talks were later continued annually in Königswinter, which is how they came to be known as the Königswinter Conferences. In 2001, the general meeting decided to change the name from the German-English Society to the German-British Society.

=== East Germany ===
In the German Democratic Republic, the German-British Society in the GDR (DEBRIG) was founded in 1963 under the umbrella of the SED controlled Liga für Völkerfreundschaft, according to official statements “in line with the wishes of numerous citizens of the German Democratic Republic and Great Britain”, but in fact as an instrument of state propaganda and the socialist concept of “friendship between peoples”.

== Conferences ==
The German-British Society – initially headquartered in Düsseldorf, then in Bonn and now at Pariser Platz 6 in Berlin – has earned a reputation as the most important non-governmental organization in German-British relations through conferences that bring together high-level decision-makers from the UK and Germany in forums; in particular, through the institution of the annual Königswinter Conference. Other conferences include the Jung Königswinter Conference and the Economic Königswinter Conference.

== See also ==
- Deutsch-Englische Gesellschaft (1935–1939)

== Literature ==
- Ralph Uhlig: Die Deutsch-Englische Gesellschaft 1949–1983. Der Beitrag ihrer „Königswinter-Konferenzen“ zur britisch-deutschen Verständigung. Vandenhoeck und Ruprecht, Göttingen 1986, ISBN 3-525-36192-0.
