= Horst Jaeger =

German businessman and Anglophile (1934–2018)

Horst Jaeger (6 July 1934 – 3 April 2018) was a German businessman and Anglophile. He was awarded the Cross of the Order of Merit of Germany for his efforts to improve Anglo-German relations and served as a senior executive at Mannesmann.
