= Lilo Milchsack =

Lilo Milchsack DCMG CBE
- Lilo Milchsack
- Born: Lisalotte Duden; 27 May 1905; Frankfurt, Germany
- Died: 7 August 1992 (aged 87); Düsseldorf, Germany
- Known for: Improving post-war Anglo-German relations
- Spouse: Hans Milchsack

Lisalotte Milchsack DCMG CBE (née Duden; 27 May 1905 – 7 August 1992) was a German promoter of post-war German-British relations. She founded the British-German Society which created an annual conference of British and German decision makers. She is said to be one of the architects of post-war Europe. She was the first German to join the British Order of St Michael and St George.

== Life ==
Lisalotte Duden was born in Frankfurt, Germany, in 1905. She came from a family who opposed the rise of Nazism, but their opposition gained them no benefit. Her education in Frankfurt, Geneva and Amsterdam University instilled in her an awareness of international affairs. Lilo married Hans Milchsack, a Rhine barge owner. Visiting Britain before the war, she pleaded with Britons to resist Hitler, only to be ignored and labeled a traitor. During the war, her family withdrew from public life. After the Second World War her husband was asked to be mayor of Düsseldorf. She was keen to improve relations between Britain and Germany. She met Robert Birley who was an education advisor to the British military in Germany. With Birley's assistance she formed an association in 1949.

== The association ==
The first meeting of the British-German Society was in March 1949 in Wittlaer. This Anglo-German Association was assisted by six leading German citizens: the teacher Theo Albeck, Headteacher Anne Franken, Prof. Dr Haas from Essen, Prof. Dr Emil Lehnartz of Münster, the painter Georg Muche, and the lawyer Dr Dietrich Stein. Robert Birley went on to be the headmaster at Eton College, but he continued to take an interest.

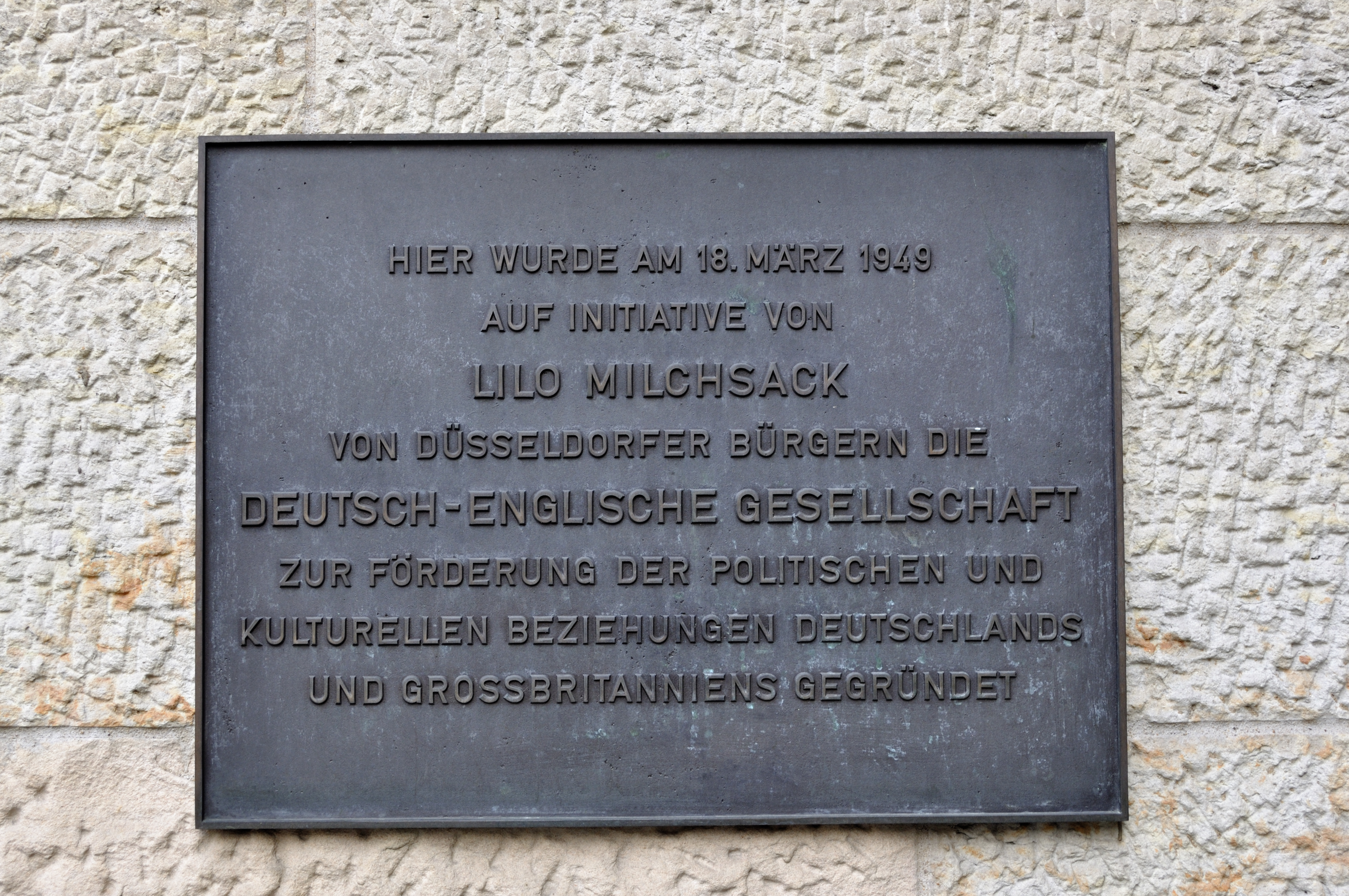
A bronze plaque in Düsseldorf which commemorates the founding of the Deutsch-Britische Gesellschaft society – The Bridge

This organisation created the Königswinter Conference in 1950 which is an annual conference for decision makers from both countries. The conference, and its successors, took its name from the German riverside town of Königswinter where the first fourteen were located at the Adam-Stegerwald-Haus. The cost of the conference was partly met by Milchsack and her husband. The conference was chaired by Birley and later by Milchsack. The conference attracted Hans von Herwarth, ex soldier, General Fridolin von Senger und Etterlin, future German President Richard von Weizsäcker and other leading German decision makers as well as leading British politicians like Denis Healey, Richard Crossman and the journalist Robin Day.

Milchsack was increasingly honoured. She was given the Order of Merit of the Federal Republic of Germany in 1959 and a British CBE in 1958, a CMG in 1969 and in 1972 she was given a DCMG to become an honorary member of the Order of St Michael and St George. This order was created in 1818 and it had never before been given to a German. The Königswinter Conference was praised by Chancellor Helmut Schmidt as a "a kind of college of higher education in politics" and Prime Minister Sir Alec Douglas-Home said that the conference was a contributor to the trust that existed between Britain and Germany during the last quarter of the twentieth century. This conference still takes place (2015) and it is organised by organisations in both countries. The location of the conference changes, alternating between host countries Britain and Germany. In 2015 the conference was in Neuhardenberg and in 2016 it will be in Oxford.

== Death and legacy ==
Milchsack died in Düsseldorf on 7 August 1992, aged 87. The conference continues and it has been copied by other countries. The politician and journalist Bill Deedes called her "one of the architects of post-war Europe" whilst The Independent said she was the "Queen of Anglo-German relations". Nigel Nicolson said she was "one of the most remarkable women of my generation...who turned hatred into friendship".
