= Anglo-German Fellowship =

Pre-World War II organisation

- Formation: September 1935
- Dissolved: September 1939
- Chairman: Lord Mount Temple

The Anglo-German Fellowship (AGF) was a membership organisation that existed from 1935 to 1939, and aimed to encourage friendly relations between the United Kingdom and Germany. Previous groups in Britain with the same aims had been wound up when Adolf Hitler came to power. It was sometimes perceived as being allied to Nazism and had fascist members. However, its founding leader Lord Mount Temple stated publicly that membership did not assume support for Nazism or antisemitism, and he later resigned in protest against Nazi antisemitism. The organisation closed down soon afterwards, at the beginning of the Second World War.

== Origins ==
In a 1935 speech, the Prince of Wales (later Edward VIII) had called for a closer understanding of Germany in order to safeguard peace in Europe, and in response Sir Thomas Moore, a Conservative Member of Parliament, suggested setting up a study group of pro-German MPs. The Anglo-German Fellowship, which had been in gestation for about a year, was established in September 1935 with Lord Mount Temple as chairman, and political secretary and historian Philip Conwell-Evans and businessman Ernest Tennant as honorary secretaries. Tennant was a friend of Joachim von Ribbentrop, German Ambassador to Britain. The group's stated aims were to foster political, professional, commercial and sporting links with Germany, but Mount Temple stated publicly that membership of the society did not assume support for Nazism or anti-Semitism.

An application was made to the Board of Trade on 26 July 1935 for "a licence directing an association about to be formed under the name of The Anglo-German Fellowship". The objectives of the proposed association were given as:

To promote good fellowship between Great Britain and Germany and their respective peoples. To study and consider the problems affecting the relations existing between Great Britain and Germany, with a view to the enhancing and promoting friendship between such countries and their respective peoples.

== Membership ==
The organisation was aimed at the influential in society, and the membership was initially led by businessmen keen to promote commercial links. Members included Bank of England director Frank Cyril Tiarks, Admiral Sir Barry Domvile, Prince von Bismarck, Governor of the Bank of England Montagu Norman and Geoffrey Dawson editor of The Times. "Corporate membership" was also available for leading companies who wished to show their support for co-operation with Germany and this was taken out by such leading organisations as Price Waterhouse, Unilever, Dunlop Rubber, Thomas Cook & Son, the Midland Bank and Lazard Brothers amongst others.

Several Members of Parliament, mostly from the Conservative Party, joined the group: they included Sir Peter Agnew, Lawrence Dundas, 2nd Marquess of Zetland, Ernest Bennett, Sir Robert Bird, Robert Tatton Bower, Douglas Douglas-Hamilton, Marquess of Clydesdale, Robert Vaughan Gower, Thomas "Loel" Guinness, Norman Hulbert, Archibald James, Alfred Knox, John Macnamara, Sir Thomas Moore, Assheton Pownall, Frank Sanderson, Duncan Sandys, Admiral Murray Sueter, Charles Taylor and Ronald Tree.

Members of the House of Lords to hold membership included Lord Brocket, Lord Galloway, the Earl of Glasgow, Lord Mount Temple, Lord Londonderry, Lord Nuffield, Lord Redesdale, Lord Rennell, the Duke of Wellington, and Josiah, Baron Stamp.

By 1937, the group seems to have had 347 members.

== Activities ==
The AGF's sister organization in Berlin was the Deutsch-Englische Gesellschaft. Neither group had an avowed mission to Nazify Britain. Instead, the two groups would unite, to host grand dinners at which leading German figures noted for their Anglophilia or their familial links to the United Kingdom, such as Rudolf Hess, Joachim von Ribbentrop, General Werner von Blomberg, the Duke of Brunswick and the Duke of Saxe-Coburg and Gotha, would be guests of honour.

However, the organisation was perceived to have pro-Nazi leanings and did have a number of fascist members. The spies Guy Burgess and Kim Philby, seeking to disguise their Communist affiliations, joined the AGF in the knowledge that it was widely perceived as allied to the far right.

=== Reaction to Nazi antisemitism ===
Lord Mount Temple resigned in November 1938 as chairman of the AGF because of the treatment of the German Jews by the Nazis. Following his resignation he told the press:

Although I have resigned from the chair of the Anglo-German Fellowship, I still remain a member of the fellowship. I wrote my letter of resignation yesterday, to be read at the council meeting this morning. In the letter I stated that I was resigning from the chairmanship because of the treatment of the Jews in Germany and the attitude of the Germans towards the Catholic and Lutheran communities. One hopes that times may become better in the future and that the good work of building up friendship between the two nations may be resumed.

The Council of the Anglo-German Fellowship met in London and released a statement:

The Council deeply regrets the events which have set back the development of better understanding between the two nations. The Council will, however, steadily prosecute its efforts to maintain contact with Germany as being the best means of supporting the Prime Minister in his policy of appeasement, and as being the most useful way of encouraging those friendly relations upon which peace depends...

== Termination ==
At the time of the Munich Crisis in 1938 Ernest Tennant recorded that the feeling in the organisation was that it should be closed down. However, it approached the UK Foreign Office for advice. Tennant reported that Lord Vansittart recommended its remaining active, which it did until the outbreak of the Second World War. However, this claim was later refuted by Vansittart. He responded that he queried the claim with the intermediary between the Fellowship and the Foreign Office, Conwell Evans, who reported that he had met with Lord Halifax on the matter.

In the House of Commons on 7 September 1939, four days after the United Kingdom and France had declared war on Germany, Vyvyan Adams MP asked the Home Secretary what the Government is doing to "deal with" organisations such as the Fellowship. To this, Sir John Anderson reported to the house that "the Anglo-German Fellowship has entirely suspended its activities".

== See also ==
- Germany–United Kingdom relations
- Deutsch-Englische Gesellschaft
- The Link (UK organisation)
- Anglo-German Friendship Committee, founded 1905
- Cliveden set
