= Anglo-Prussian alliance =

Anglo-Prussian alliance may refer to:

- Anglo-Prussian alliance (1756)
- Anglo-Prussian alliance (1788)
