= Germany–United Kingdom relations =

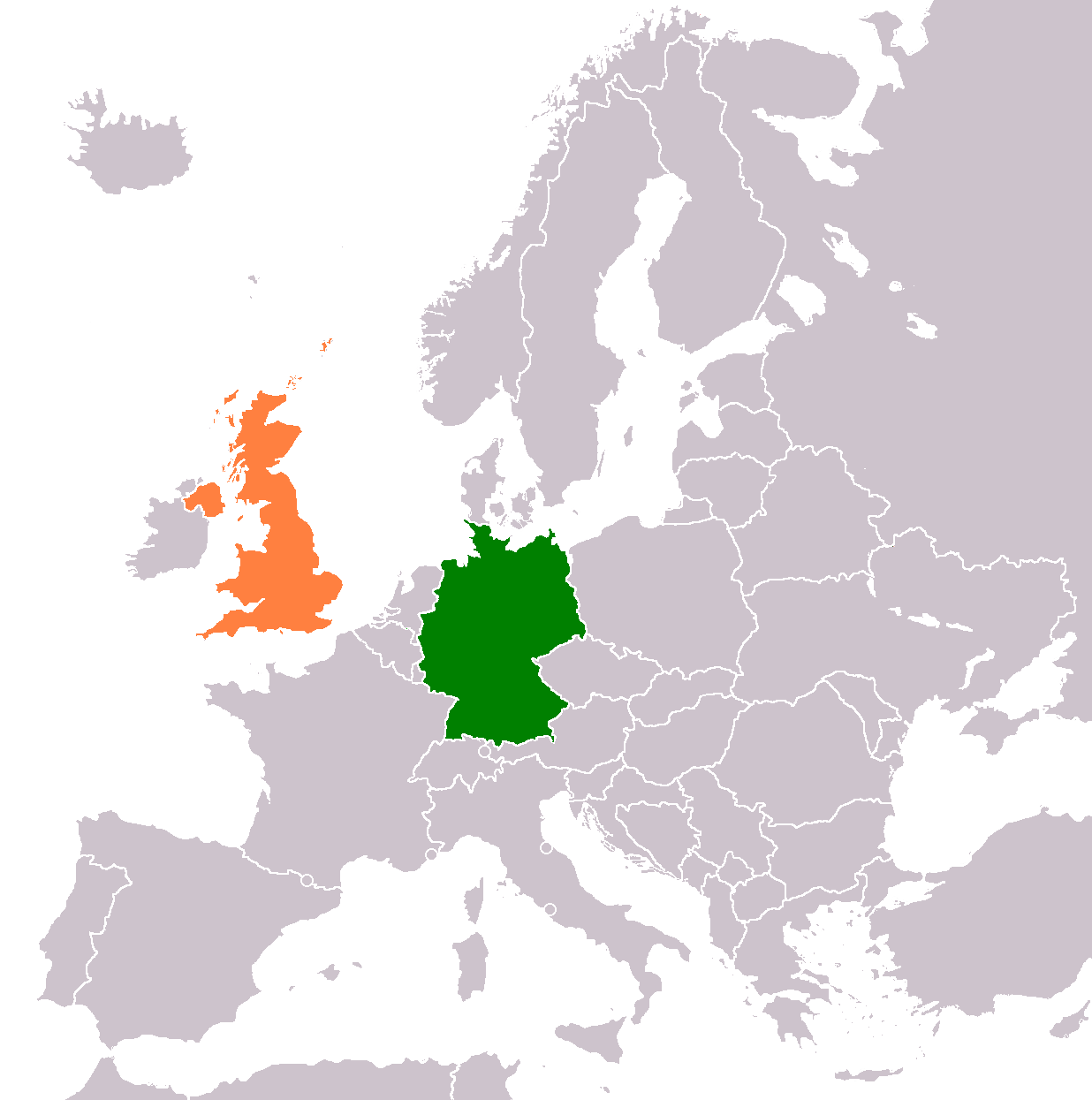

- Germany: United Kingdom

Diplomatic mission
- Embassy of Germany, London: Embassy of the United Kingdom, Berlin

Envoy
- Ambassador Susanne Baumann since September 2025: Ambassador Andrew Jonathan Mitchell CMG since September 2024

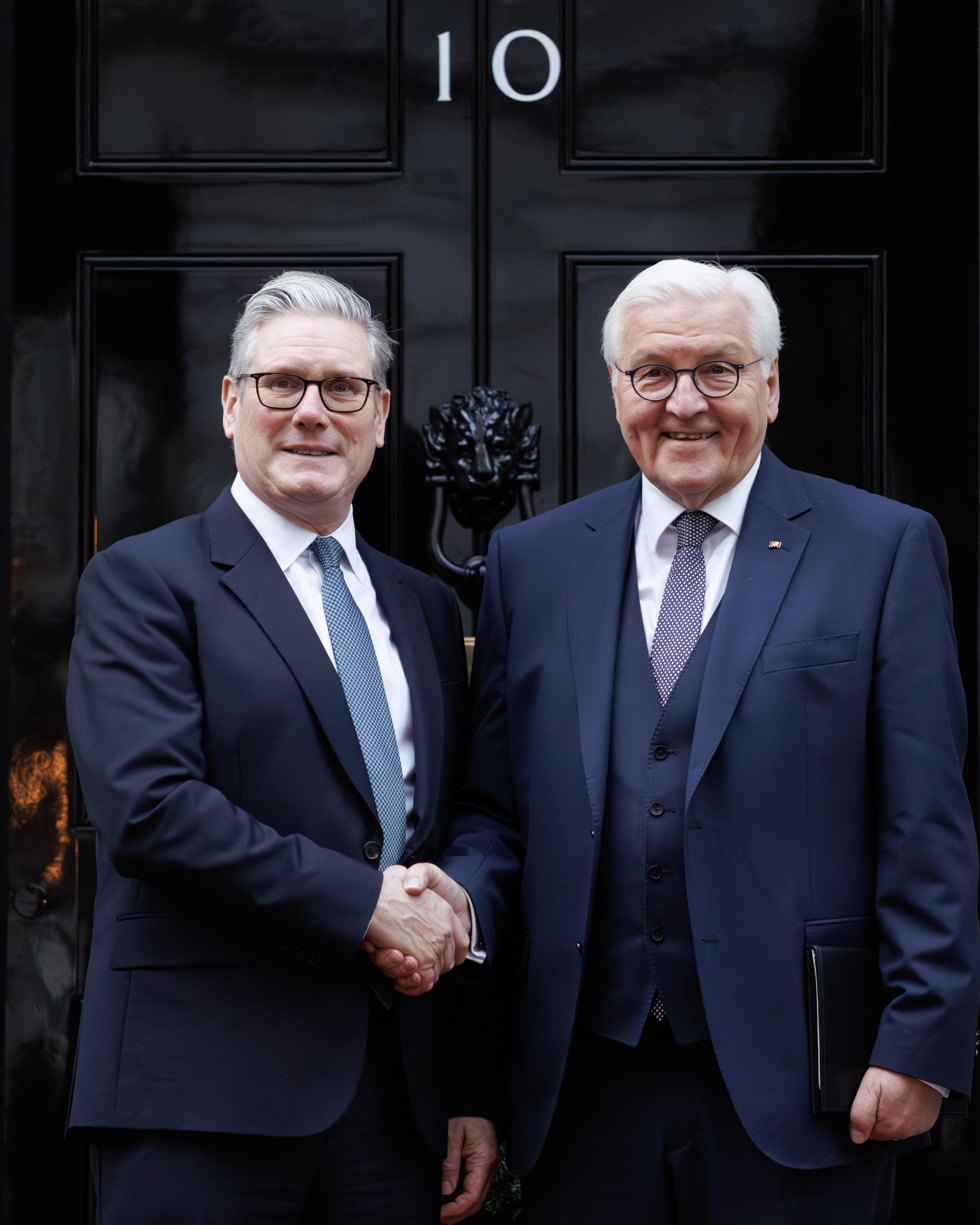
British Prime Minister Keir Starmer with German President Frank-Walter Steinmeier in London, December 2025

Germany–United Kingdom relations are the bilateral relations between the Federal Republic of Germany and the United Kingdom of Great Britain and Northern Ireland. Relations between the countries span hundreds of years.

During Classical antiquity and the Migration Period, the progenitors of the populations of the United Kingdom and Germany consisted of the same Ingvaeonic and Elbe Germanic peoples.

Relations were strong in the Late Middle Ages when the German cities of the Hanseatic League traded with England and Scotland.

Before the Unification of Germany in 1871, Britain was often allied in wartime with German states, including Prussia. The royal families often intermarried. The House of Hanover (1714–1837) ruled the small Electorate of Hanover, later the Kingdom of Hanover, as well as Britain. Queen Victoria, known as the grandmother of Europe, married Prince Albert of Saxe-Coburg and Gotha, and further diplomatic marriages would result in their grandchildren occupying both the British and German thrones.

Historians have long focused on the diplomatic and naval rivalries between Germany and Britain after 1871 to search for the root causes of the growing antagonism that led to World War I. In recent years, historians have paid greater attention to the mutual cultural, ideological and technological influences.

Germany, as the German Empire, fought against the United Kingdom and its allies in World War I between 1914 and 1918; and, as Nazi Germany, against the United Kingdom and allied forces in World War II between 1939 and 1945. Germany was defeated by the United Kingdom and its allies in both wars. Following the defeat of Nazi Germany, Germany was occupied by the allied forces, including the United Kingdom, from 1945 to 1955, after which it was divided into West Germany and East Germany.

The United Kingdom became close allies with West Germany during the Cold War, through West Germany's integration into the Western world. Contrastingly, relations between East Germany and the United Kingdom were poor owing to the former's alliance with the Soviet Union during the Cold War.

West Germany was a founding member of the European Communities, later to become the European Union, which the United Kingdom joined in 1973. West Germany and the United Kingdom were among the most powerful countries in the organisation, both having significant influence on its development. Germany broadly favoured European integration, whereas the United Kingdom generally opposed it.

East and West Germany reunified in 1990 following the fall of the Berlin Wall in 1989, which symbolized the end of the Cold War, hence an improvement of the relationship between East Germany and the United Kingdom, with which she had developed along with West Germany.

Through membership of the European Union, trade and cooperation with the United Kingdom significantly increased in many areas, particularly in research and development which has created enduring links between the science and university communities of Germany and the United Kingdom. The United Kingdom is the second largest consumer of German motor vehicles after Germany herself.

In a referendum on continued membership of the European Union in 2016, the United Kingdom voted to withdraw from the European Union and left the bloc on 31 January 2020 after 47 years of membership. Despite a slight reduction in trade afterwards, the amity between the countries remain strong in many areas, which has been reinforced by their joint response to the Russian invasion of Ukraine.

UK Government data reported 126,000 German nationals lived in the United Kingdom in 2013, while German Government data showed 107,000 British nationals living in Germany in 2016. Both countries are members of the Council of Europe and NATO. Germany is a European Union member and the United Kingdom is a former European Union member.

== Historical connections ==
=== Shared heritage ===
The spread of Angles (orange), Saxons (blue) and Jutes (green) to the British Isles around 500 AD. Primarily based on Bede's Ecclesiastical History of the English People.

English and German are both West Germanic languages. Modern English has diverged significantly after absorbing more French influence after 1066. English has its roots in the languages spoken by Germanic peoples from mainland Europe, more specifically various peoples that came from what is now the Netherlands, Germany and Denmark, including a people called the Angles after whom the English are named. Many everyday words in English are of Germanic origin and are similar to their German counterparts, and more intellectual and formal words are of French, Latin or Greek origin, but German tends to form calques of many of these. English has become a dominant world language and is widely studied in Germany. German, in the 19th and the early 20th centuries, was an important language of science and technology, but it has now largely lost that role. In English schools, German was a niche language and much less important than French. German is no longer widely studied in Britain, except at the A-level in secondary schools.

==== Trade and Hanseatic League ====
There is a long history of trade relations between the Germans and the British. The Hanseatic League was a commercial and defensive confederation of merchant guilds, which dominated trade across Northern Europe from the Baltic to the North Sea in the 13th to the 17th centuries. The Hanseatic League established trading post in many ports and cities. The steelyard of London was one of the largest one.

==== Royal family ====
Until the late 17th century, marriages between the English and German royal families were uncommon. Empress Matilda, the daughter of Henry I of England, was married between 1114 and 1125 to Henry V, Holy Roman Emperor, but they had no issue. In 1256, Richard, 1st Earl of Cornwall, was elected King of Germany, and his sons were surnamed Almain. German mercenaries were hired in the Wars of the Roses.

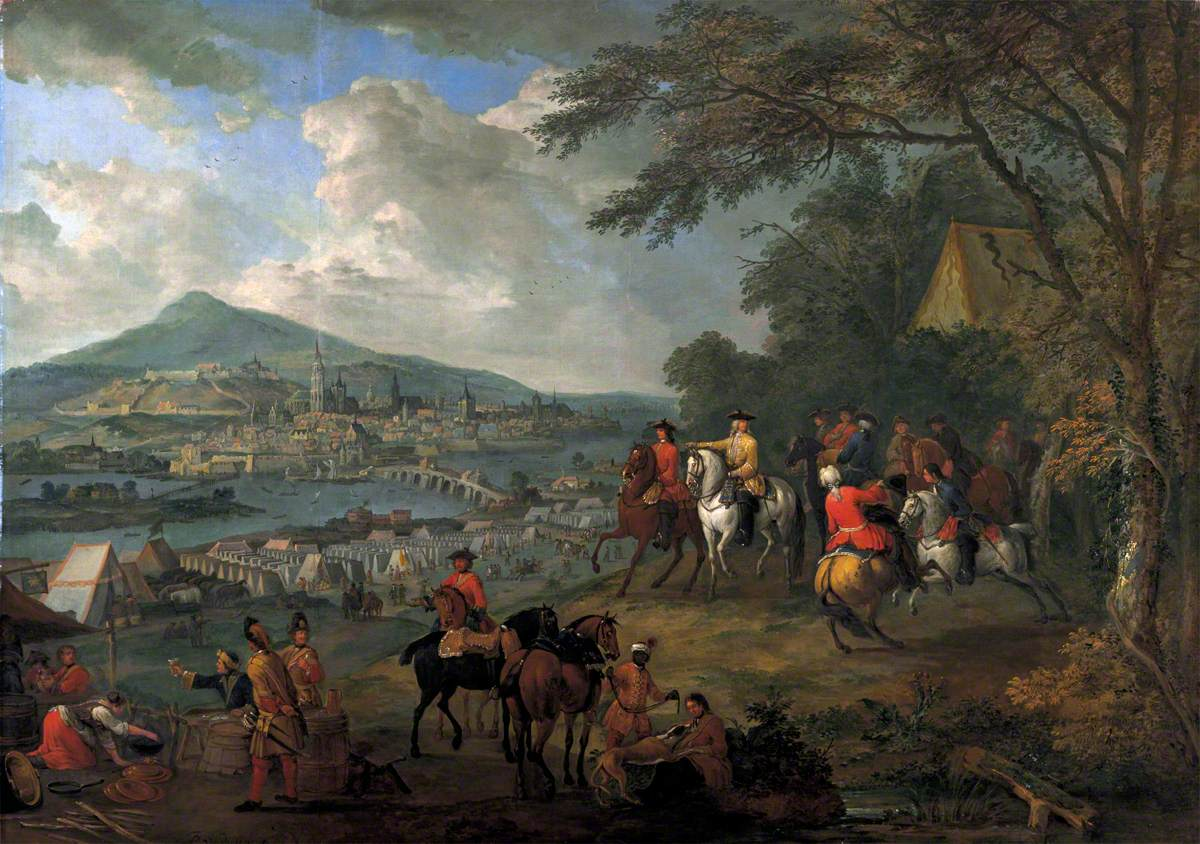
Under the Elector's son Prince George, Hanoverian troops played a major part in Marlborough's major victory at the Battle of Oudenarde in 1708.

Anne of Cleves was the consort of Henry VIII, but it was not until William III of England that a king of German origin came to reign, from the House of Nassau. Prince George of Denmark, from the House of Oldenburg, was the consort of his successor Queen Anne who had no surviving children.

In 1714, George I, a German-speaking Hanoverian prince of mixed British and German descent, ascended to the British throne, founding the House of Hanover. For over a century, Britain's monarchs were also rulers of Hanover (first as Prince Electors of the Holy Roman Empire and then as Kings of Hanover). There was only a personal union, and both countries remained quite separate, but the king lived in London. British leaders often complained that Kings George I, who barely spoke any English, and George II were heavily involved in Hanover and distorted British foreign policy for the benefit of Hanover, a small, poor, rural and unimportant country in Western Europe. In contrast, King George III never visited Hanover in the 60 years (1760–1820) that he ruled it. Hanover was occupied by France during the Napoleonic Wars, but some Hanoverian troops fled to England to form the King's German Legion, an ethnic German unit in the British army. The personal link with Hanover finally ended in 1837, with the accession of Queen Victoria to the British throne, while obtaining Heligoland from Denmark. The semi-Salic law prevented her from being on the throne of Hanover since a male relative was available.

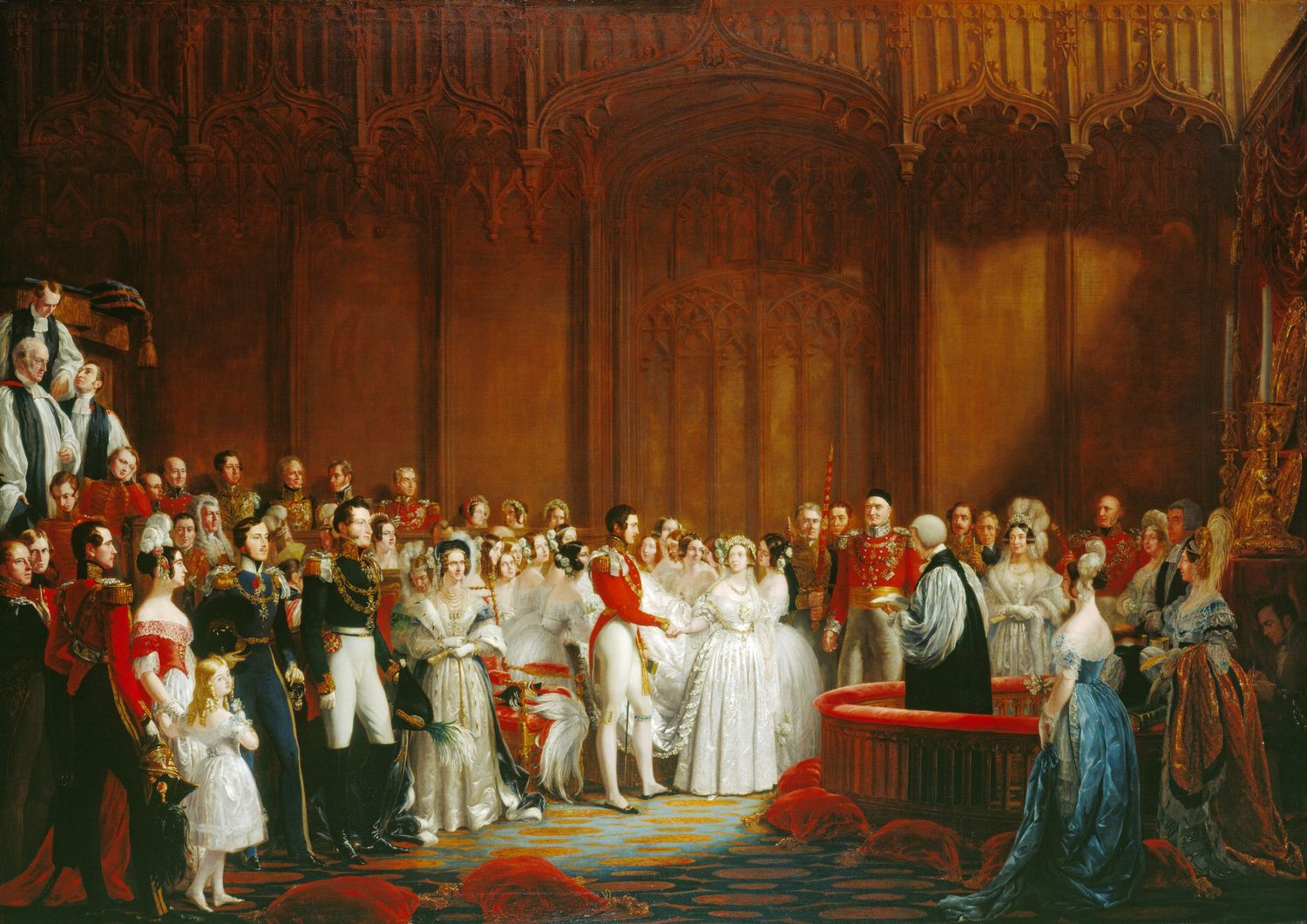
Queen Victoria's wedding to Prince Albert of Saxe-Coburg and Gotha in the Chapel Royal, St James's Palace

Every British monarch from George I to George V in the 20th century took a German consort. Queen Victoria was raised under close supervision by her German-born mother, Princess Victoria of Saxe-Coburg-Saalfeld and married her first cousin Prince Albert of Saxe-Coburg and Gotha in 1840. Their daughter, Princess Victoria, married Prince Friedrich Wilhelm of Prussia in 1858, who became Crown Prince three years later. Both were liberals, admired Britain and detested German Chancellor Otto von Bismarck, but Bismarck had the ear of the elderly German Emperor Wilhelm I, who died in 1888. Friedrich Wilhelm now became Emperor Fredrich III until he died only 99 days later, and Princess Victoria became Empress of Germany. Her son became Emperor Wilhelm II and forced Bismarck to retire two years later.

==== Wilhelm II (1888–1918) ====
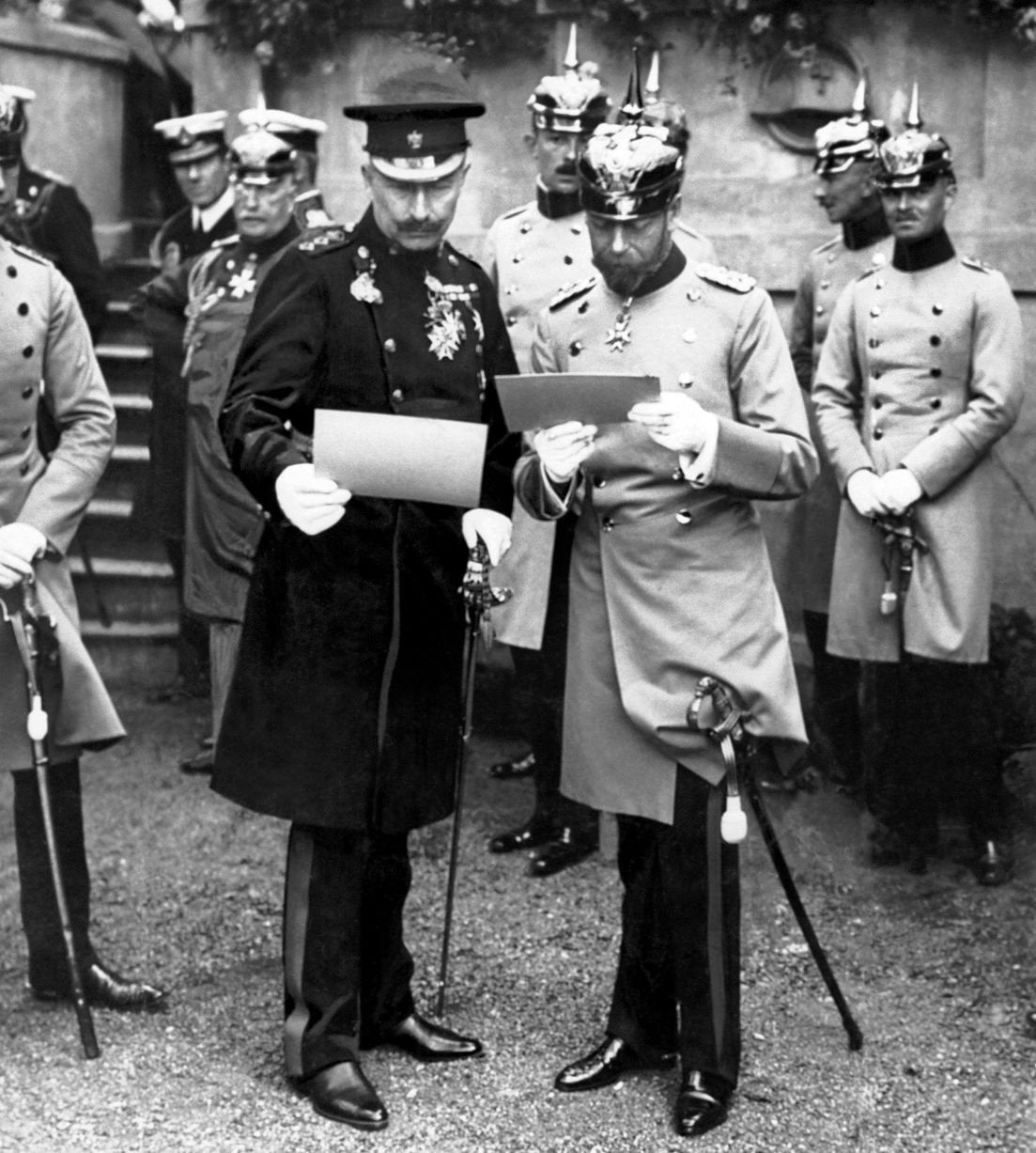
Wilhelm II with George V, wearing the military uniforms of each other's army

Wilhelm, the grandson of Queen Victoria, had a love-hate relationship with Britain. He visited it often and was well known in its higher circles, but he recklessly promoted the great expansion of the Imperial German Navy, which was a potential threat that the British government could not overlook. A humiliating crisis came with the Daily Telegraph Affair of 1908. While on an extended visit to Britain, the Kaiser had a series of conversations with his host, Edward Stuart-Wortley. In the hope that it would help improve British–German relations, he gave his notes, with Wilhelm's permission, to The Daily Telegraph, which wrote them up in the form of an interview. The result, which Wilhelm approved, was full of his bombast and exaggerations. He was quoted as calling the British populace "mad, mad as March hares" for questioning his peaceful intentions and sincere desire for peace with England, although he admitted that the German populace was in general "not friendly" toward England. The "interview" caused a sensation around Europe, demonstrating that the Kaiser was utterly without tact in diplomatic affairs. The British had already decided that Wilhelm was at least somewhat mentally disturbed and saw the interview as further evidence of his unstable personality rather than an indication of official German hostility. The affair was much more serious in Germany, where he was nearly unanimously ridiculed. He thereafter played mostly a ceremonial role in major state affairs.

The British Royal family retained the German surname von Sachsen-Coburg-Gotha until 1917, when, in response to anti-German feelings during World War I, it was legally changed to the more British name House of Windsor. In the same year, all members of the British Royal Family gave up their German titles, and all German relatives who were fighting against the British in the war were stripped of their British titles by the Titles Deprivation Act 1917.

=== Intellectual influences ===
Ideas flowed back and forth between the two nations. Refugees from Germany's repressive regimes often settled in Britain, most notably Karl Marx and Friedrich Engels. Advances in technology were shared, as in chemistry. Over 100,000 German immigrants also came to Britain. Germany was one of the world's main centres for innovative social ideas in the late 19th and the early 20th centuries. The British Liberal welfare reforms, around 1910, led by the Liberals H. H. Asquith and David Lloyd George, adopted Bismarck's system of social welfare. Ideas on town planning were also exchanged.

=== Diplomacy ===
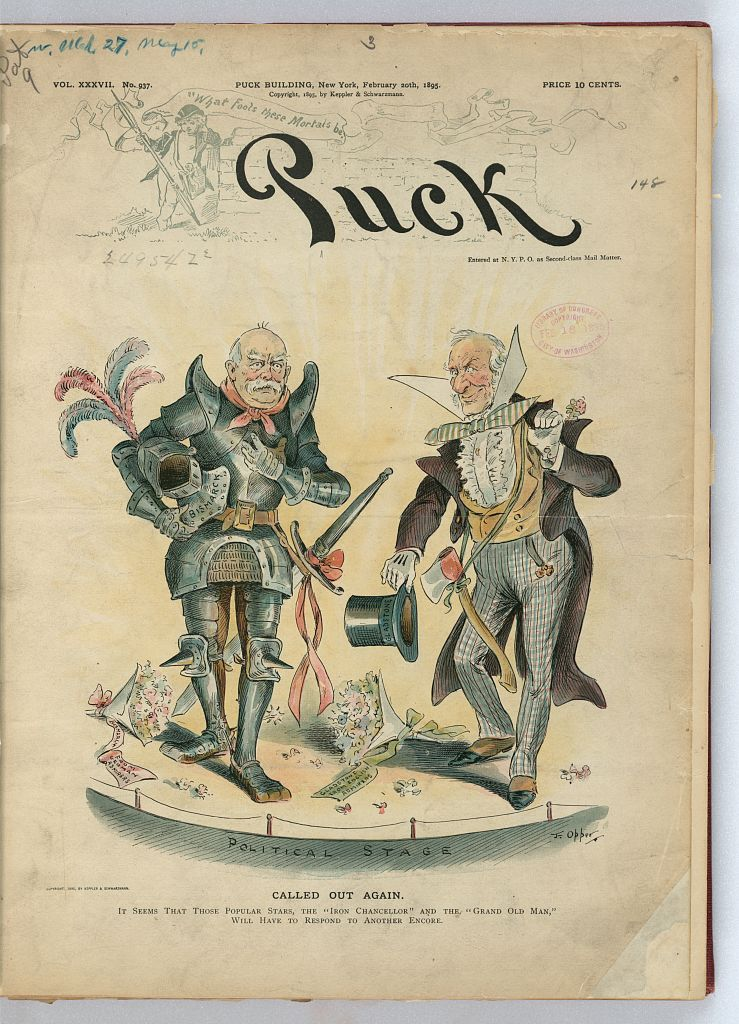
Caricature by Opper 1895 of Germany's Bismarck & Britain's Gladstone as performers on the political stage

The British Foreign Office at first was poorly served by a series of ambassadors who provided only superficial reports on the dramatic internal German developments of the 1860s. That changed with the appointment of Odo Russell (1871–1884), who developed a close rapport with Bismarck and provided in depth coverage of German developments.

Britain gave passive support to the unification under Prussian domination for strategic, ideological and business reasons. The German Empire was considered a useful counterbalance on the continent to both France and Russia, the two powers that worried Britain the most. The threat from France in the Mediterranean and from Russia in Central Asia could be neutralised by a judicious relationship with Germany. The new nation would be a stabilising force, and Bismarck especially promoted his role in stabilising Europe and in preventing any major war on the continent. British Prime Minister William Ewart Gladstone, however, was always suspicious of Germany, disliked its authoritarianism and feared that it would eventually start a war with a weaker neighbour. The ideological gulf was stressed by Lord Arthur Russell in 1872:

Prussia now represents all that is most antagonistic to the liberal and democratic ideas of the age; military despotism, the rule of the sword, contempt for sentimental talk, indifference to human suffering, imprisonment of independent opinion, transfer by force of unwilling populations to a hateful yoke, disregard of European opinion, total want of greatness and generosity, etc., etc."

Britain was looking inward and avoided picking any disputes with Germany but made it clear, in the "war in sight" crisis of 1875, that it would not tolerate a pre-emptive war by Germany on France.

Germany and Britain initially cooperated but diverging issues over surrounding Egyptian question. France, unhappy with British dominance in Egypt and Suez Canal ownership, along with Germany (which had interests in African colonies), refused to be bound by certain British agreements (March 13 for France, April 18 for Germany). This refusal temporarily united Germany and France in opposition to Britain, forming a sort of tactical alliance that could indirectly pressure London. German Chancellor Bismarck sought to weaken Britain's influence by leveraging disputes elsewhere, such as the Angra Pequena dispute in South West Africa.

The Fashoda Incident saw Germany strategic opening gained geopolitical leverage, While the crisis generated discussion about predispositions for Anglo-German cooperation or anti-British alignments, no substantive alliance emerged. The Kaiser and Prince of Bülow signals were indecisive, and France was cautious in foreign policy. In the long run, Fashoda reinforced Germany's perception of being diplomatically on the periphery in colonial disputes and foreshadowed the realignment of European powers preceding the Entente and chance to prevented Great War.

=== Colonies ===
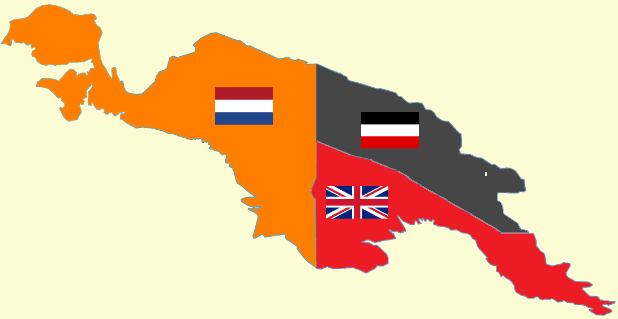
The island of New Guinea from 1884 to 1919. Germany controlled the north-eastern part and Britain the south-eastern part.

Bismarck built a complex network of European alliances that kept the peace in the 1870s and 1880s. The British were building up their empire, but Bismarck strongly opposed colonies as too expensive. When public opinion and elite demand finally made him, in the 1880s, grab colonies in Africa and the Pacific, he ensured that conflicts with Britain were minimal.

=== Improvement and worsening of relations ===
Relations between Britain and Germany improved as the key policymakers, Prime Minister Lord Salisbury and Chancellor Bismarck, were both realistic conservatives and largely both agreed on policies. There were even several proposals for a formal treaty relationship between Germany and Britain, but they went nowhere, as Britain preferred to stand in what it called "splendid isolation." Nevertheless, a series of developments steadily improved their relations down to 1890, when Bismarck was pushed out by the aggressive Wilhelm II.

In 1891, two nations made attempts to establish closer ties with the Triple Alliance. The Triple Alliance at the time consisted of Austria-Hungary, Italy, and Germany. Friedrich von Holstein championed closer ties with Austria-Hungary and Britain, advocating a pro-Anglo-Austrian stance while opposing the renewal of the Reinsurance Treaty with Russia. Lord Salisbury particularly negotiating with Italy. Britain's interest was primarily in stabilizing the Mediterranean protocol and maintaining the European balance of power. However, British policymakers, including Salisbury and Lord Lansdowne, were skeptical about stability and territorial ambitions for balance of power. Their sufficient partners caution reflected concerns over issues alone and whether Britain should risk entanglement in Central European conflicts. Although these negotiations were unsuccessful in formal terms, they were interpreted in Russian diplomatic circles as a nominal success, reflecting the secrecy, uncertainty often present the intense espionage, and intelligence rivalry prevalent in late 19th-century European diplomacy.

Coming to power in 1888, the young Wilhelm dismissed Bismarck in 1890 and sought aggressively to increase Germany's influence in the world (Weltpolitik). Foreign policy was controlled by the erratic Kaiser, who played an increasingly-reckless hand and by the leadership of Friedrich von Holstein, a powerful civil servant in the Foreign Office. Wilhelm argued that a long-term coalition between France and Russia had to fall apart, Russia and Britain would never get together and Britain would eventually seek an alliance with Germany. Russia could not get Germany to renew its mutual treaties and so formed a closer relationship with France in the 1894 Franco-Russian Alliance since both were worried about German aggression. Britain refused to agree to the formal alliance that Germany sought. Since Germany's analysis was mistaken on every point, the nation was increasingly dependent on the Triple Alliance with Austria-Hungary and Italy. That was undermined by the ethnic diversity of Austria-Hungary and its differences with Italy. The latter, in 1915, would switch sides.

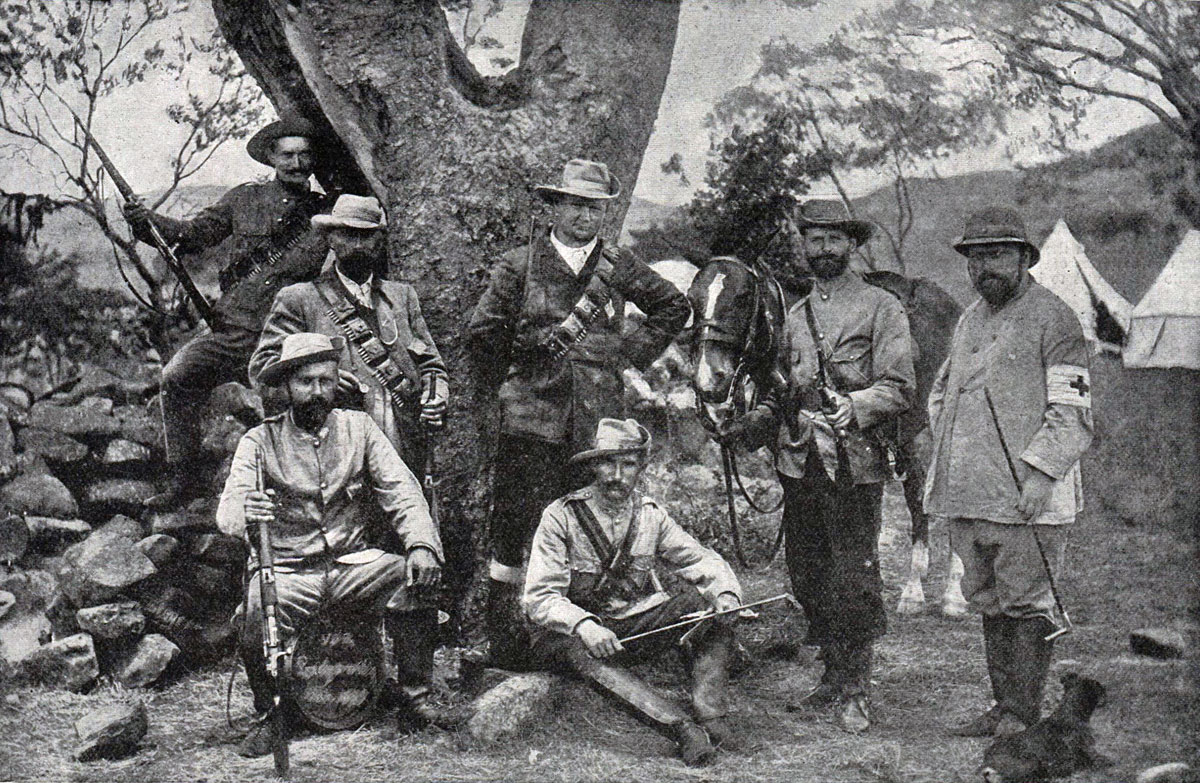
German volunteers fighting on the side of the Boers against the British invasion in the Second Boer War, 1899

In January 1896 Wilhelm escalated tensions with his Kruger telegram, congratulating Boer President Kruger of the Transvaal for beating off the Jameson raid. German officials in Berlin had managed to stop the Kaiser from proposing a German protectorate over the Transvaal. In the Second Boer War, Germany sympathised with the Boers.

The 1901 propose alliance of Imperial Germany-British Empire negotiations illustrate how geopolitical strategy, domestic politics, and misaligned diplomatic cultures prevented an alliance that might have fundamentally altered early 20th-century European balance. While participants like Sir Joseph Chamberlain and Baron Hermann von Eckardstein were proactive, their lack of professional diplomatic experience, combined with conflicting national objectives and public pressure, rendered the initiative unviable. The episode underscores how diplomacy requires the convergence of timing, shared interests, and credible communication, and how deep-seated structural divergences can doom even the most earnest peacemaking efforts.

In March 1904, Kaiser Wilhelm II visited Gibraltar in a highly ceremonial and politically symbolic visit. Wilhelm arrived at Gibraltar aboard the German liner Koenig Albert, escorted by the armored cruiser SMS Friedrich Karl. As an honorary admiral of the Royal Navy, his flag was briefly hoisted on the British battleship HMS Caesar, symbolizing his naval status and personal ties to Britain. Germany and Britain were not yet officially friendship treaty or at direct odds, and there was still a short window where an Anglo-German alliance was plausible. This visit occurred a month before the signing of the Entente Cordiale between Britain and France in April 1904. Under German Foreign Minister Bernhard von Bülow, it was the new policy for Germany to assert its claim to be a global power. Bismarck's conservativism was abandoned, as Germany was intent on challenging and upsetting international order. Thereafter relations deteriorated steadily. Britain began to see Germany as a hostile force and moved to friendlier relationships with France.

=== Naval race ===
The Royal Navy dominated the globe in the 19th century, but after 1890, Germany attempted to achieve parity. The resulting naval race heightened tensions between the two nations. In 1897 Admiral Tirpitz became German Naval Secretary of State and began the transformation of German Navy from small, coastal defence force to a fleet that was meant to challenge British naval power. Tirpitz calls for Risikoflotte (Risk Fleet) that would make it too risky for Britain to take on Germany, as part of a wider bid to alter the international balance of power decisively in Germany's favour.

The German Navy, under Tirpitz, had ambitions to rival the Royal Navy and dramatically expanded its fleet in the early 20th century to protect the colonies and to exert power worldwide. Tirpitz started a programme of warship construction in 1898. In 1890, to protect its new fleet. Germany traded the strategic island of Heligoland in the North Sea with Britain. In exchange, Britain gained the Eastern African island of Zanzibar, where it proceeded to construct a naval base. The British, however, were always well ahead in the naval race and introduced the highly advanced Dreadnought battleship in 1907.

In February 1912, Haldane Mission aimed to ease tensions between Britain and Germany by slowing the naval arms race and seeking potential mutual guarantees, Despite initial discussions, the mission failed to produce a binding agreement. Germany strongly desired British neutrality in a potential war, which Britain was unwilling to guarantee. Though it represents an early British effort to manage rising tensions with Germany through diplomacy rather than confrontation.

=== Two Moroccan crises ===
In the First Moroccan Crisis of 1905, there was nearly war between Germany against Britain and France over a French attempt to establish a protectorate over Morocco. The Germans were upset at not being informed. Wilhelm made a highly provocative speech for Moroccan independence. The following year, a conference was held at Algeciras in which all of the European powers except Austria-Hungary (now increasingly seen as little more than a German satellite) sided with France. A compromise was brokered by the United States for the French to relinquish some of their control over Morocco.

From 1907 onwards through negotiations, Franco-German Agreement on Morocco, signed on 9 February 1909. This compromise accord recognized Morocco's independence, while formally acknowledging France's "special political interests" in the region. Germany secured economic and commercial privileges, including guaranteed access to Moroccan markets, essentially trading political control for economic influence. The agreement was a strategic compromise: Germany accepted limited French dominance in Morocco but received concessions elsewhere (notably in Central Africa) as part of broader colonial negotiations.

Although the agreement avoided an immediate military crisis, it did not resolve underlying Franco-German antagonism. Germany's humiliation in prior Moroccan affairs had left lingering distrust, which would resurface during the Second Moroccan Crisis in 1911, France prepared to send more troops into Morocco. German Foreign Minister Alfred von Kiderlen-Waechter was not opposed to that if Germany had compensation elsewhere in Africa, in the French Congo. He sent a small warship, the SMS Panther, to Agadir, made saber-rattling threats and whipped up anger by German nationalists. France and Germany soon agreed on a compromise, with France gaining control of Morocco and Germany gaining some of the French Congo. The British cabinet, however, was angry and alarmed at Germany's aggression. Lloyd George made a dramatic "Mansion House" speech that denounced the German move as an intolerable humiliation. There was talk of war until Germany backed down, and relations remained sour.

=== Start of World War I ===
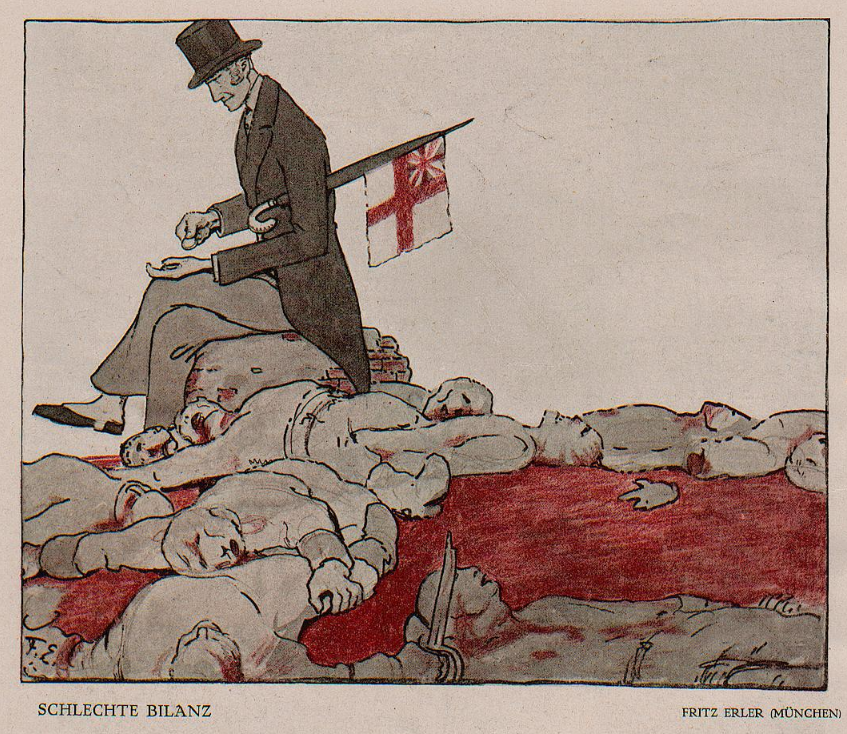
German anti-British propaganda, 1914

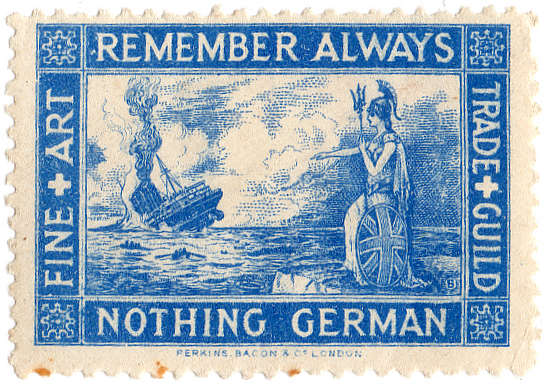
British anti-German propaganda stamp, pointing out unrestricted submarine warfare

The Liberal Party controlled the British government in 1914 and was averse to war with anyone and wanted to remain neutral as the First World War suddenly erupted in July 1914. Since relations with Germany regarding colonies and the naval race had improved in 1914 it did not expect trouble. However Liberal Prime Minister H.H. Asquith and especially Foreign Minister Edward Grey were committed to defending France, which was weaker than Germany. The Conservative Party was very hostile to Germany as a threat both to Britain and to France. The emerging Labour Party and other socialists denounced the war as a capitalist device to maximize profits.

In 1907, the leading German expert in the Foreign Office, Eyre Crowe, wrote a memorandum for senior officials that warned vigorously against German intentions. Crowe argued that Berlin wanted "hegemony... in Europe, and eventually in the world". Crowe argued that Germany presented a threat to the balance of power as that of Napoleon. Germany would expand its power unless the 1904 Entente Cordiale with France was upgraded to a full military alliance. Crowe was taken seriously, especially because he was born in Germany. During a secret diplomatic mission in 1914, Baron Sir Tyrrell negotiated with diplomat Gottlieb von Jagow on a security trade agreement and military alliance with Germany.

In Germany, left-wing parties, especially the Social Democratic Party (SPD), in the 1912 German election, won a third of the vote and the most seats for the first time. German historian Fritz Fischer famously argued that the Junkers, who dominated Germany, wanted an external war to distract the population and to whip up patriotic support for the government. Other scholars, like Niall Ferguson, think that German conservatives were ambivalent about war and that they worried that losing a war would have disastrous consequences and that even a successful war might alienate the population if it was long or difficult.

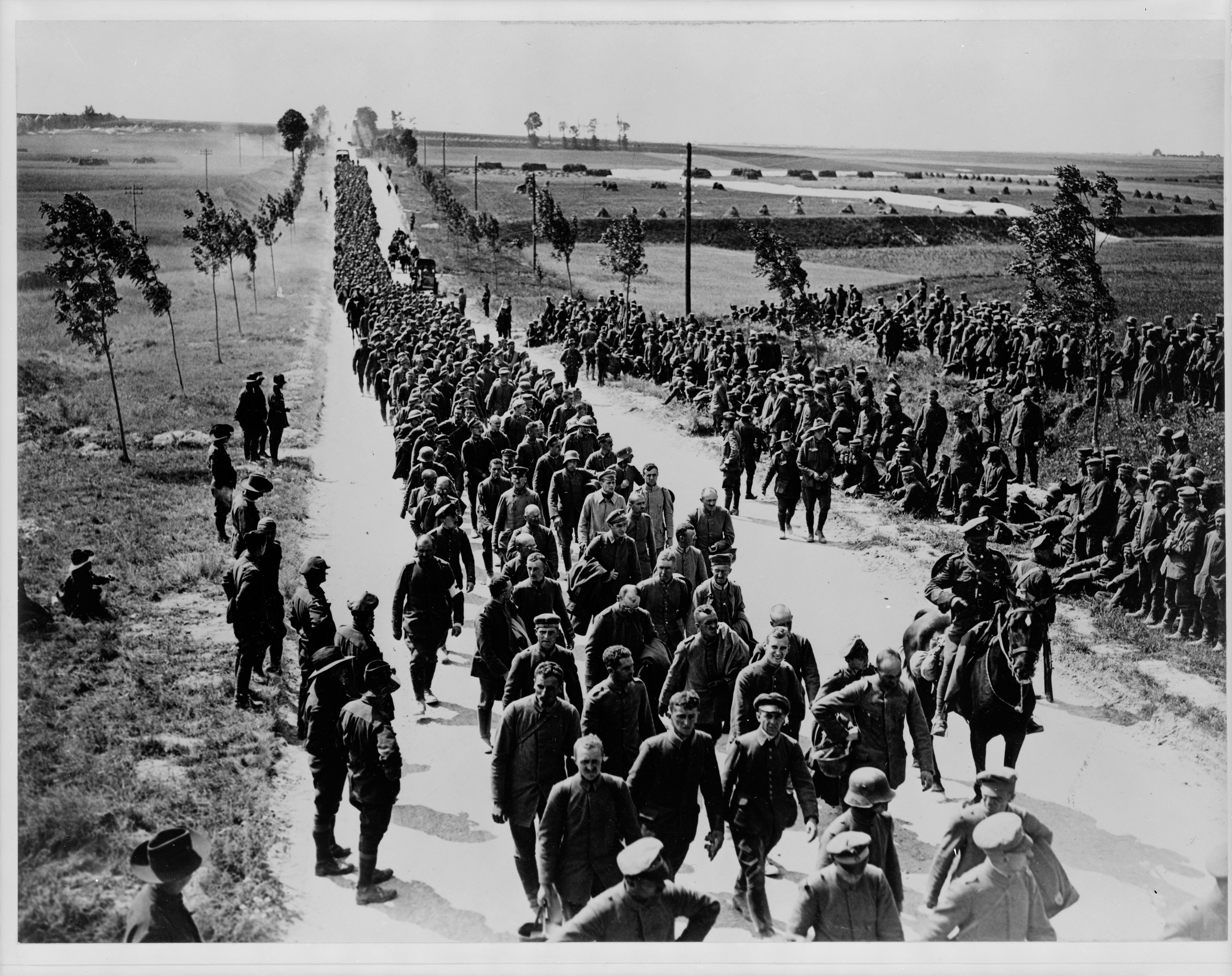
German prisoners of war on the Western Front in British captivity, 1916

In explaining why neutral Britain went to war with Germany, Paul Kennedy, in The Rise of the Anglo-German Antagonism, 1860–1914 (1980), argued Germany had become economically more powerful than Britain. Kennedy downplayed the disputes over economic trade and imperialism. There had long been disputes over the Baghdad Railway which Germany proposed to build through the Ottoman Empire. An amicable compromise on the railway was reached in early 1914 so it played no role in starting the July Crisis. Germany relied upon time and again on sheer military power, but Britain began to appeal to moral sensibilities. Germany saw its invasion of Belgium as a necessary military tactic, and Britain saw it as a profound moral crime, a major cause of British entry into the war. Kennedy argues that by far the main reason for the war was London's fear that a repeat of 1870, when Prussia led other German states to smash France, would mean Germany, with a powerful army and navy, would control the English Channel and northwestern France. British policymakers thought that would be a catastrophe for British security.

In 1839, Britain, Prussia, France, and the Netherlands agreed to the Treaty of London that guaranteed the neutrality of Belgium. Germany violated that treaty in 1914, with its chancellor Theobald von Bethmann Hollweg ridiculing the treaty a "scrap of paper". That ensured that Liberals would join Conservatives in calling for war. Historian Zara Steiner says that in response to the German invasion of Belgium:

The public mood did change. Belgium proved to be a catalyst which unleashed the many emotions, rationalizations, and glorifications of war which had long been part of the British climate of opinion. Having a moral cause, all the latent anti-German feelings, that by years of naval rivalry and assumed enmity, rose to the surface. The 'scrap of paper' proved decisive both in maintaining the unity of the government and then in providing a focal point for public feeling.

In 1916, Prince Lichnowsky authored a pamphlet (later published as the "Lichnowsky Memorandum") critiquing German diplomacy, particularly the alliance with Austria-Hungary, which he believed dragged Germany into unnecessary Balkan conflicts and ultimately caused the war. Another diplomat effort was considered the British counterpart such as the Lansdowne Letter by Marquess of Lansdowne. Both Lansdowne and Lichnowsky were notable for advocating peace amidst a climate of militarism. The letter represented a rare plea within the British establishment to end the war through negotiated settlement, while Lichnowsky's pamphlet exposed the shortcomings of European chaotic diplomacy leading up to and during the July Crisis. Their writings became crucial historical sources for understanding the diplomatic environment and decision-making leading to the Great War. Although neither succeeded in achieving immediate peace, both are remembered as figures who sought to mitigate the destructiveness of the conflict through reasoned international advocacy.

=== Allied victory ===
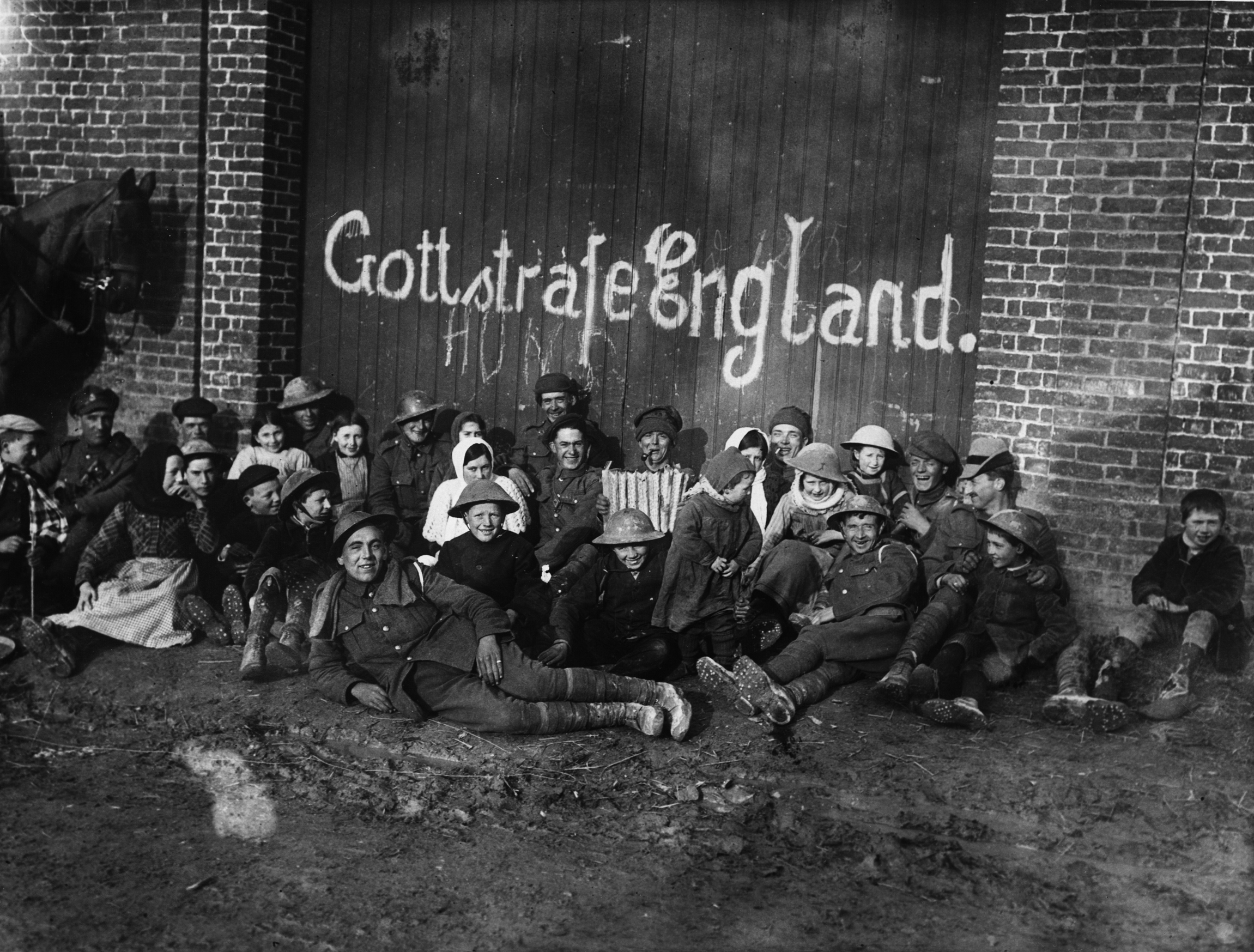
British soldiers and French civilians next to the slogan May God punish England painted on a wall by German troops, 1 January 1918

The great German offensive on the Western Front in spring 1918 almost succeeded. The Germans broke through into open country but outran their supplies and artillery support. By summer 1918, American soldiers were arriving on the front at 10,000 a day, but Germany was unable to replace its casualties and its army shrank every day. A series of huge battles in September and October produced sweeping Allied victories, and the German High Command, under Field Marshal Paul von Hindenburg, saw it had lost and told Wilhelm to abdicate and go into exile.

In November, the new republic negotiated an armistice, hoping to obtain lenient terms based on the Fourteen Points of US President Woodrow Wilson. Instead, the terms amounted almost to a surrender: Allied forces occupied Germany up the River Rhine, and Germany was required to disarm, losing its war gains, colonies and navy. By keeping the food blockade in place, the Allies were determined to starve Germany until it agreed to peace terms.

In the 1918 election, only days later, British Prime Minister Lloyd George promised to impose a harsh treaty on Germany. At the Paris Peace Conference in early 1919, however, Lloyd George was much more moderate than France and Italy, but he still agreed to force Germany to admit starting the war and to commit to paying the entire cost of the Allies in the war, including veterans' benefits and interest.

=== Interwar period ===
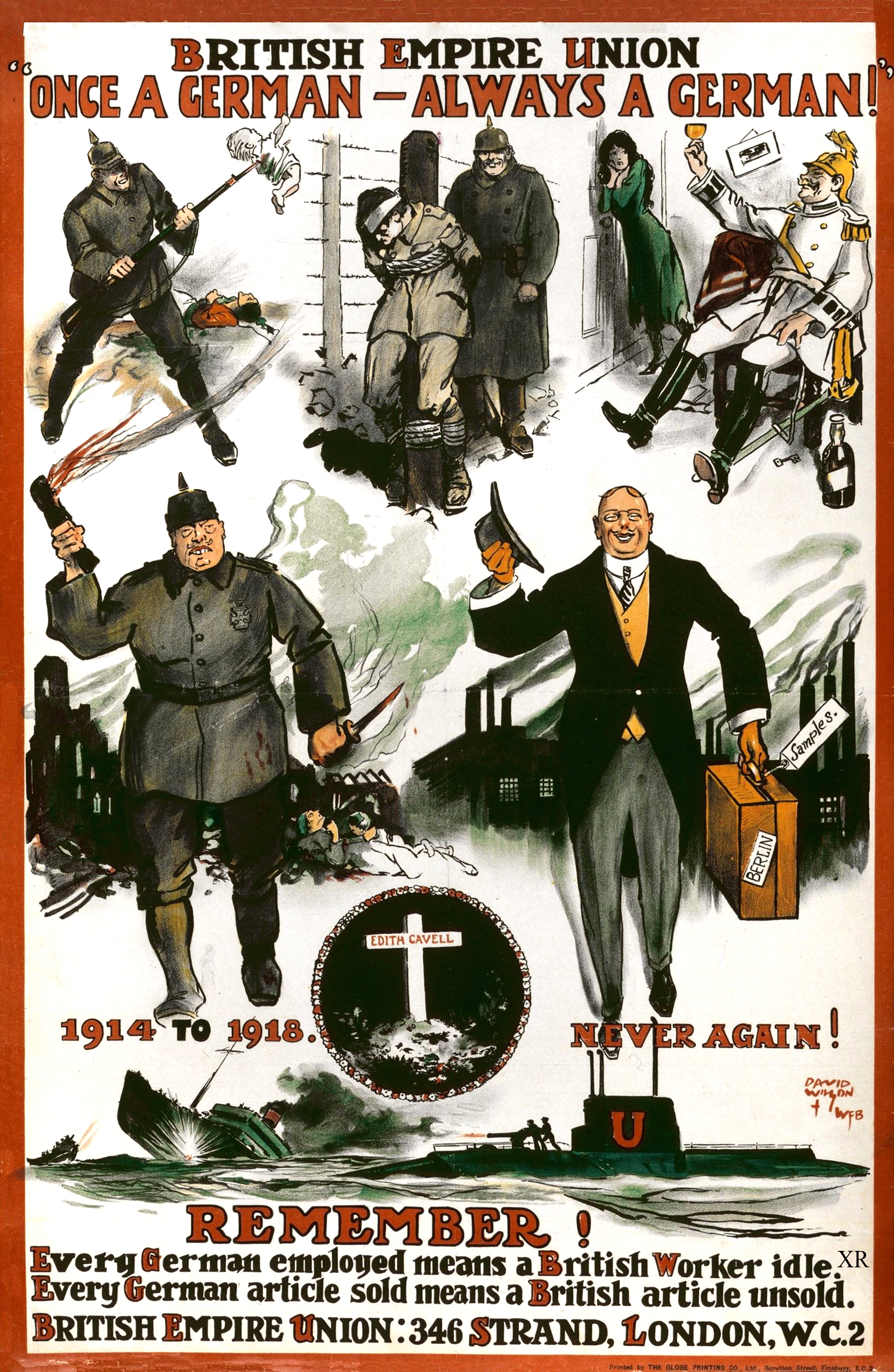
Propaganda poster, c. 1919, from the British Empire Union calling for boycott of German goods

From 1920 to 1933, Britain and Germany were on generally good terms, as shown by the Locarno Treaties and the Kellogg–Briand Pact, which helped reintegrate Germany into Europe.

At the 1922 Genoa Conference, Britain clashed openly with France over the amount of reparations to be collected from Germany. In 1923, France occupied the Ruhr industrial area of Germany after Germany defaulted in its reparations. Britain condemned the French move and largely supported Germany in the Ruhrkampf (Ruhr Struggle) between the Germans and the French. In 1924, Britain forced France to make major reductions on the amount of reparations Germany had to pay.

The Dawes Plan (1924–1929) stabilised the German currency and lowered reparations payments, allowing Germany to access capital markets (mostly American) for the money it owed the Allies in reparations, although the payments came at the price of a high foreign debt. Much of the money returned to Britain, which then paid off its American loans. From 1931, German payments to Britain were suspended. Eventually, in 1951, West Germany would pay off the World War I reparations that it owed to Britain.

With the coming to power of Hitler and the Nazis in 1933, relations worsened. In 1934, a secret report by the British Defence Requirements Committee called Germany the "ultimate potential enemy against whom all our 'long range' defence policy must be directed," and called for an expeditionary force of five mechanised divisions and fourteen infantry divisions. However, budget restraints prevented the formation of a large force.

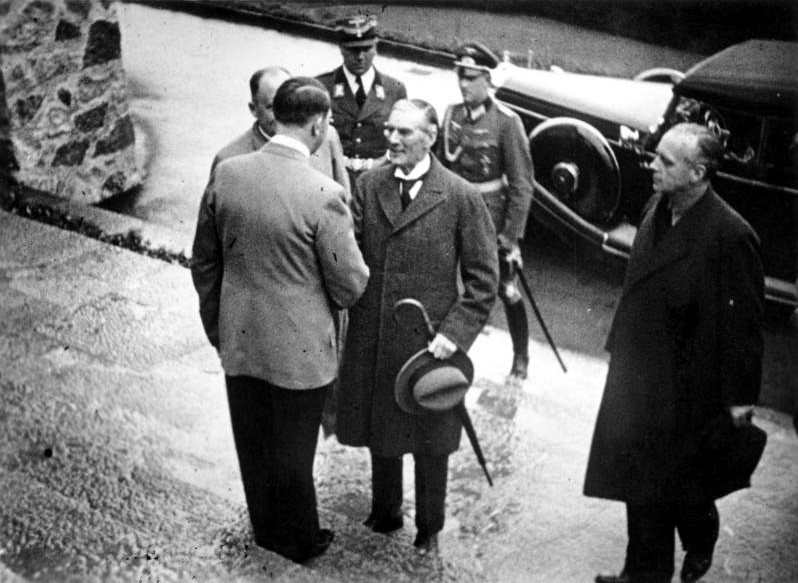
Adolf Hitler greets British Prime Minister Neville Chamberlain on the steps of the Berghof, 15 September 1938

Germany and Britain, along with France and Italy, were signatories of the Quadripartite Agreement of 1933, but while they formally supported it, their visions for European stability were different, leading to limited practical cooperation. Germany sought to revise the post-World War I settlement, particularly the Treaty of Versailles, and to improve its diplomatic standing in Europe. Germany viewed the pact as a way to engage with Britain and France diplomatically while strengthening its influence. Britain supported the pact more as a diplomatic instrument to maintain the balance of power in Europe and to limit unilateral initiatives by any single power. Britain prioritized stability and sought to avert direct conflict, but it was cautious about fully endorsing Germany's ambitions for territorial revision. Although both nations were ostensibly co-supporters, their divergent strategic objectives and reciprocal distrust hindered the pact from yielding significant tangible results in peacekeeping or crisis management.

In 1935, the two nations agreed to the Anglo-German Naval Agreement to avoid a repeat of the pre-1914 naval race.

By 1936, appeasement was British effort to prevent war or at least to postpone it until the British military was ready. Appeasement has been the subject of intense debate for 70 years by academics, politicians and diplomats. Historians' assessments have ranged from condemnation for allowing Hitler's Germany to grow too strong to the judgement that it was in Britain's best interests and that there was no alternative.

At the time, the concessions were very popular, especially the Munich Agreement in 1938 of Germany, Britain, France and Italy.

=== World War II ===
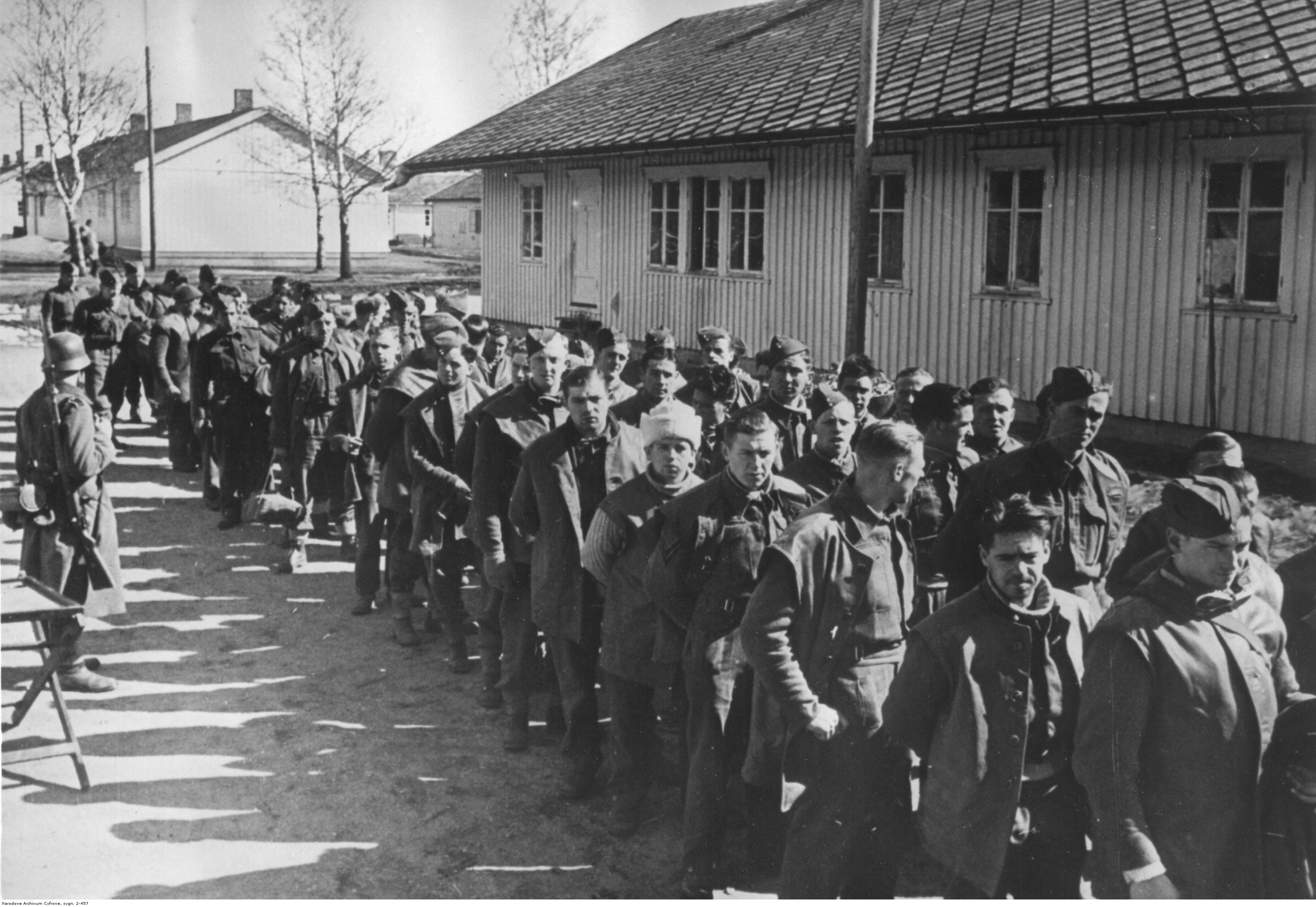
British prisoners of war in Trondheim, May 1940

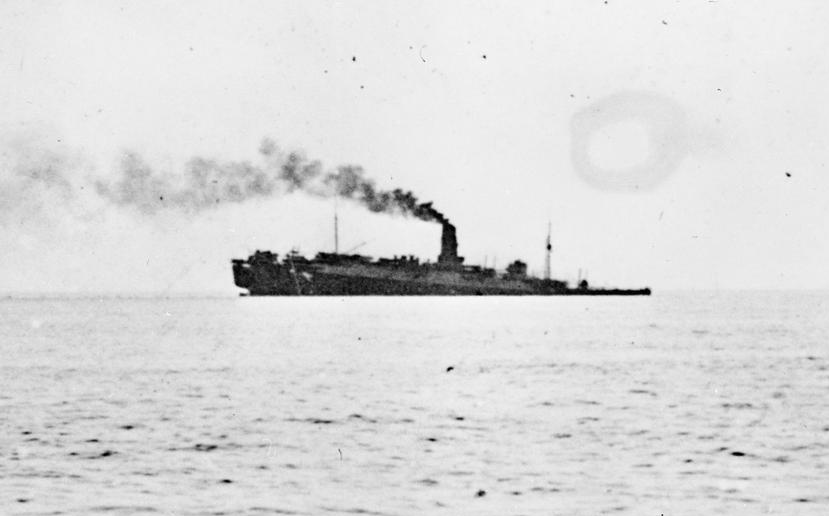
Lancastria sinking off Saint-Nazaire

Germany and Britain fought each other from the British declaration of war, in September 1939, to the German surrender, in May 1945. The war continues to loom large in the British public memory.

At the beginning of the war, Germany defeated Poland. In spring 1940, Germany astonished the world by quickly invading the Low Countries and France, driving the British army off the Continent and seizing most of its weapons, vehicles and supplies. War was brought to the British skies in the Battle of Britain in late summer 1940, but the aerial assault was repulsed, which stopped Operation Sealion, the plans for the invasion of Britain.

The British Empire was standing alone against Germany, but the United States greatly funded and supplied the British. In December 1941, United States entered the war against Germany and Japan after the attack on Pearl Harbor by Japan, which also later overwhelmed British outposts in the Pacific from Hong Kong to Singapore.

The Allied invasion of France on D-Day in June 1944 as well as strategic bombing and land forces all contributed to the final defeat of Germany.

=== Since 1945 ===
British zone of occupation

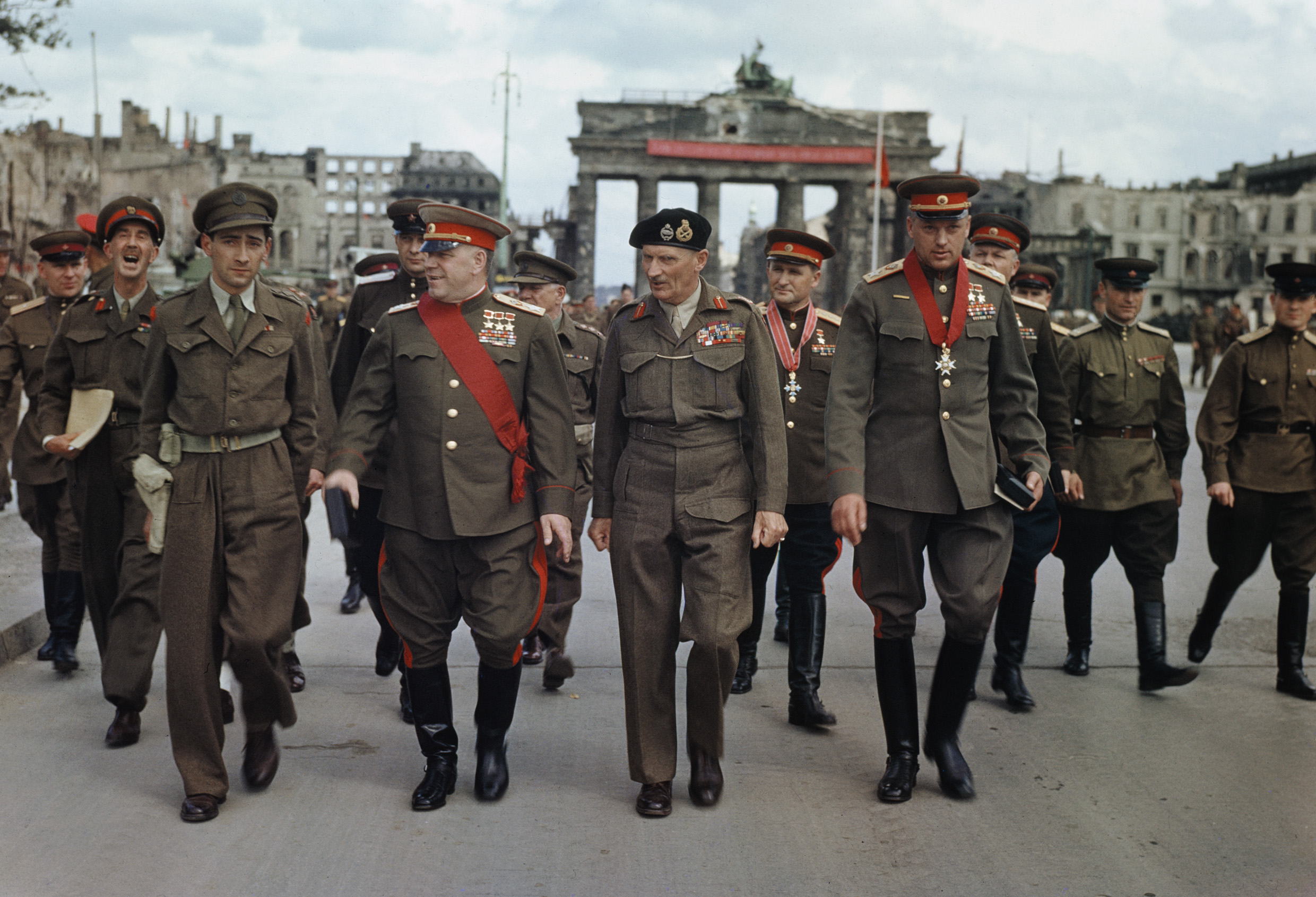
Field Marshal Bernard Montgomery with Soviet Marshals and generals at the Brandenburg Gate in Berlin, 12 July 1945

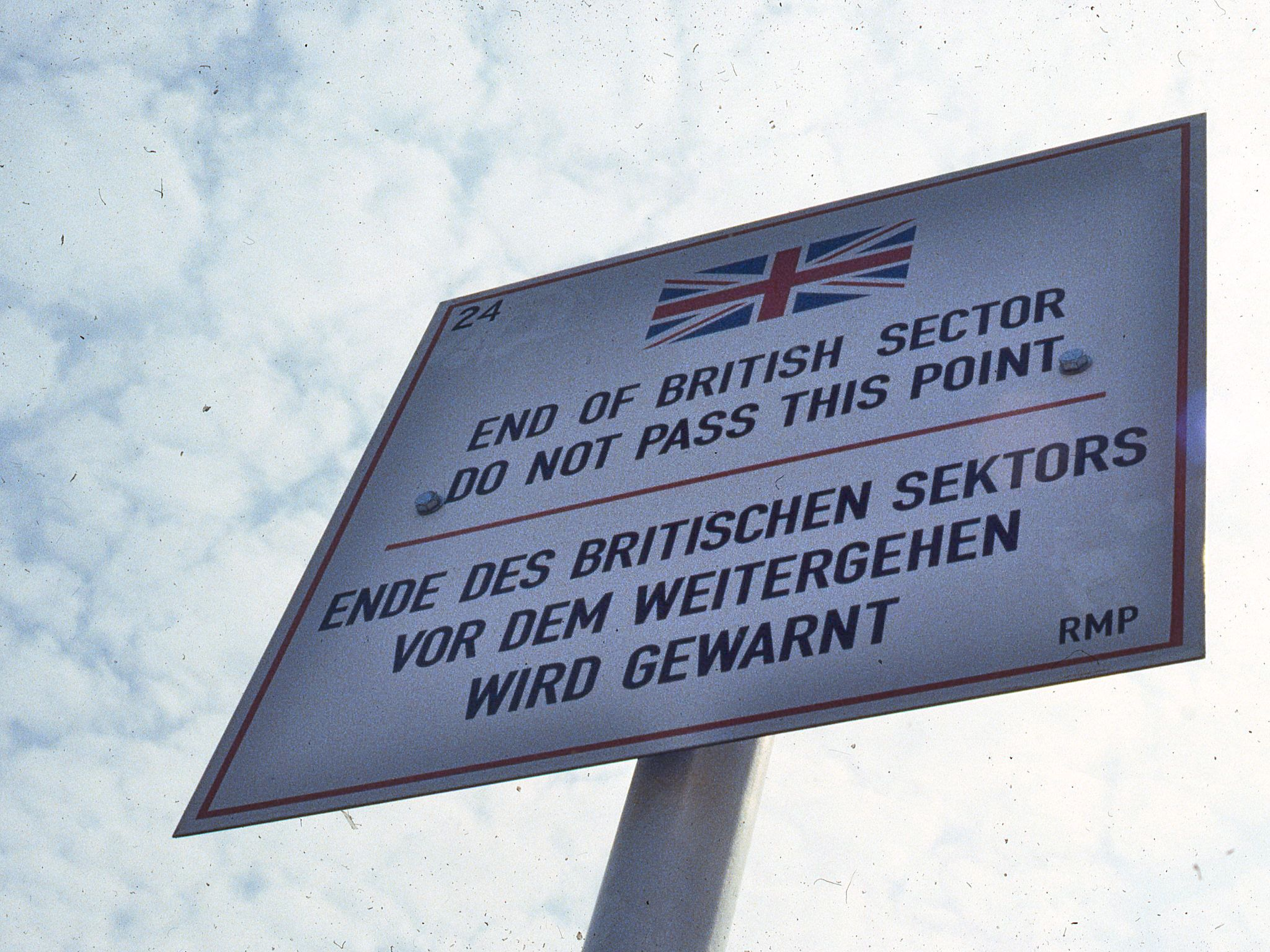
Road sign delimiting the British zone of occupation in Berlin, 1984

==== Occupation ====
As part of the Yalta Agreement and Potsdam Agreement, Britain took control of its own sector in occupied Germany. It soon merged its sector with the American and French sectors, and that territory became the independent nation of West Germany in 1949. The British played a central role in the Nuremberg trials of major war criminals in 1946. In Berlin, the British, American, and French zones were joined into West Berlin, and the four occupying powers kept official control of the city until 1991.

Much of Germany's industrial plant fell within the British zone and there was trepidation that rebuilding the old enemy's industrial powerhouse would eventually prove a danger to British security and compete with the battered British economy. One solution was to build up a strong, free trade union movement in Germany. Another was to rely primarily on American money, through the Marshall Plan, that modernised both the British and German economies, and reduced traditional barriers to trade and efficiency. It was Washington, not London, that pushed Germany and France to reconcile and join in the Schumann Plan of 1950 by which they agreed to pool their coal and steel industries.

==== Cold War ====
With the United States taking the lead, Britain with its Royal Air Force played a major supporting role in providing food and coal to Berlin in the Berlin airlift of 1948–1949. The airlift broke the Soviet blockade which was designed to force the Western Allies out of the city.

In 1955, West Germany joined NATO, while East Germany joined the Warsaw Pact. Britain at this point did not officially recognise East Germany. However the left wing of the Labour Party, breaking with the anti-communism of the postwar years, called for its recognition. This call heightened tensions between the British Labour Party and the German Social Democratic Party (SPD).

After 1955, Britain decided to rely on relatively inexpensive nuclear weapons as a deterrent against the Soviet Union, and a way to reduce its very expensive troop commitments in West Germany. London gained support from Washington and went ahead with the reductions while insisting it was maintaining its commitment to the defence of Western Europe.

Britain made two applications for membership in the Common Market (European Community). It failed in the face of the French veto in 1961, but its reapplication in 1967 was eventually successful, with negotiations being concluded in 1972. The diplomatic support of West Germany proved decisive.

In 1962, Britain secretly assured Poland of its acceptance of the latter's western boundary. West Germany had been ambiguous about the matter. Britain had long been uneasy with West Germany's insistence on the provisional nature of the boundary. On the other hand, it was kept secret so as not to antagonise Britain's key ally in its quest to enter the European Community.

In 1970, the West German government under Chancellor Willy Brandt, the former mayor of West Berlin, signed a treaty with Poland recognizing and guaranteeing the borders of Poland.

==== Reunification ====
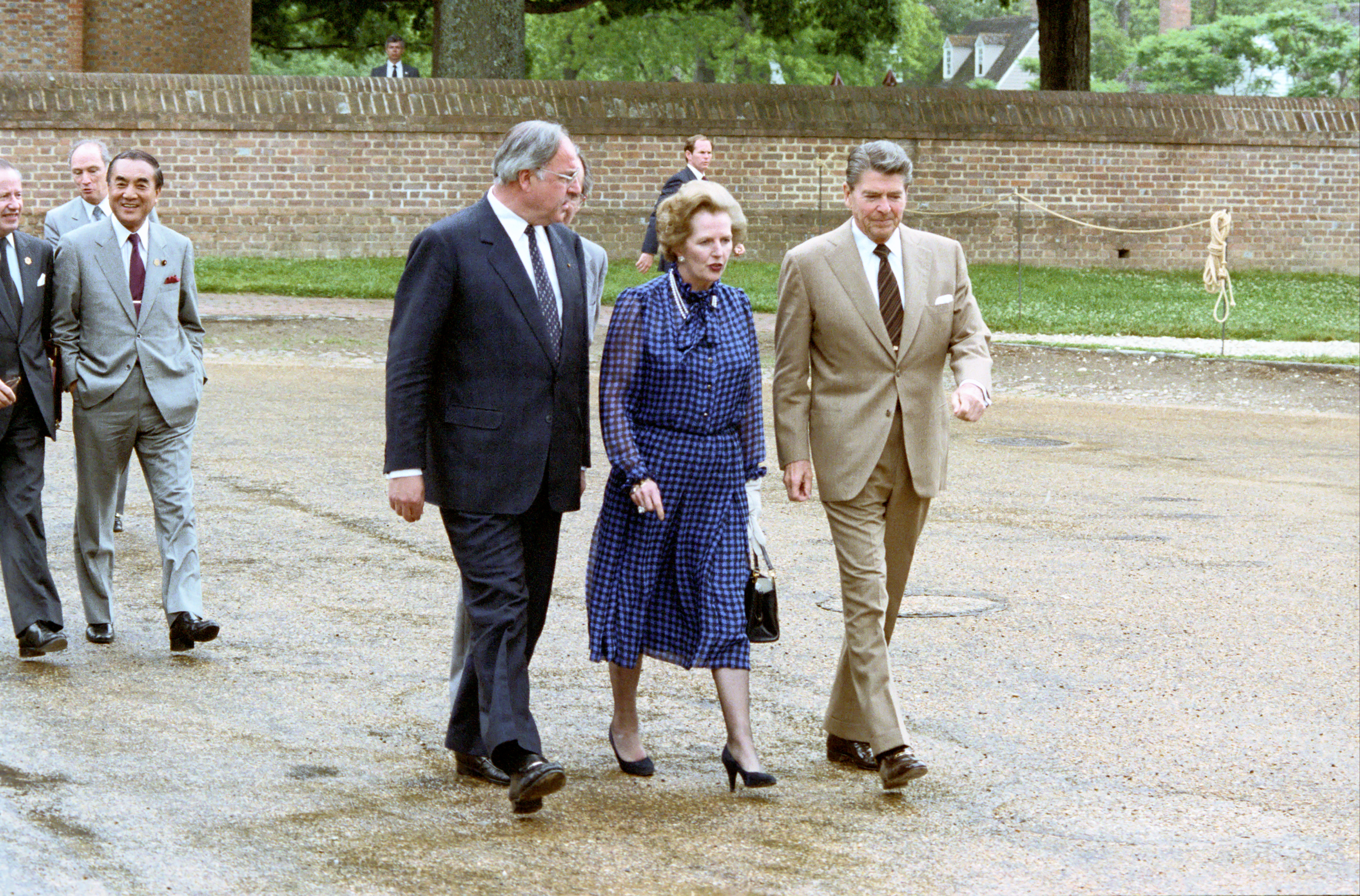
Prime Minister Margaret Thatcher with German Chancellor Helmut Kohl and US President Ronald Reagan, 1983

In 1990, United Kingdom prime minister Margaret Thatcher at first opposed German reunification but eventually accepted the Treaty on the Final Settlement with Respect to Germany.

Since 1945, Germany hosts several British military installations in Western part of the country as part of British Army Germany. Both countries are members of NATO, and share strong economic ties. David McAllister, the former minister-president of the German state of Lower Saxony, son of a Scottish father and a German mother, holds British and German citizenship. Similarly, the former leader of the Scottish National Party in the British House of Commons, Angus Robertson is half German, as his mother was from Germany. Robertson speaks fluent German and English.

In 1996, Britain and Germany established a shared embassy building in Reykjavik. Celebrations to open the building were held on 2 June 1996 and attended by the British Foreign Secretary at the time, Malcolm Rifkind, and the then Minister of State at the German Foreign Ministry, Werner Hoyer, and the Icelandic Foreign Minister Halldór Ásgrímsson. The commemorative plaque in the building records that it is "the first purpose built co-located British-German chancery building in Europe".

In October 2024 the Trinity House Agreement between both countries defence ministers was signed to "deepen defence cooperation across all domains". In July 2025 both concluded the Kensington Treaty deepening relations further. German Chancellor Friedrich Merz called the treaty a "historic day for German-British relations".

== Twinnings ==
- (Scotland) Aberdeen, Aberdeenshire and Regensburg, Bavaria
- (Wales) Aberystwyth, Ceredigion and Kronberg im Taunus, Hesse
- (England) Abingdon, Oxfordshire and Schongau, Bavaria
- (England) Amersham, Buckinghamshire and Bensheim, Hesse
- (England) Ashford, Kent and Bad Münstereifel, North Rhine-Westphalia
- (England) Barking and Dagenham, London and Witten, North Rhine-Westphalia
- (England) Barnet, London and Tempelhof-Schöneberg, Berlin
- (England) Barnsley, South Yorkshire and Schwäbisch Gmünd, Baden-Württemberg
- (England) Basingstoke, Hampshire and Euskirchen, North Rhine-Westphalia
- (England) Bath, Somerset and Braunschweig, Lower Saxony
- (England) Bedford, Bedfordshire and Bamberg, Bavaria
- (Northern Ireland) Belfast and Bonn, North Rhine-Westphalia
- (England) Beverley, East Riding of Yorkshire and Lemgo, North Rhine-Westphalia
- (England) Biggleswade, Bedfordshire and , Erlensee, Hesse
- (England) Birmingham and Frankfurt, Hesse
- (England) Blackpool and Bottrop, North Rhine-Westphalia
- (England) Blyth, Northumberland and Solingen, North Rhine-Westphalia
- (England) Bolton, Greater Manchester and Paderborn, North Rhine-Westphalia
- (England) Bracknell, Berkshire and Leverkusen, North Rhine-Westphalia
- (England) Brentwood, Essex and Roth, Bavaria
- (England) Bristol and Hanover, Lower Saxony
- (England) Bromley, London and Neuwied, Rhineland-Palatinate
- (England) Cambridge, Cambridgeshire and Heidelberg, Baden-Württemberg
- (England) Cannock, Staffordshire and Datteln, Baden-Württemberg
- (Wales) Cardiff, South Glamorgan and Stuttgart, Baden-Württemberg
- (England) Carlisle, Cumbria and Flensburg, Schleswig-Holstein
- (England) Chelmsford, Essex and Backnang, Baden-Württemberg
- (England) Cheltenham, Gloucestershire and Trier, Rhineland-Palatinate
- (England) Chesham, Buckinghamshire and Friedrichsdorf, Hesse
- (England) Chester, Cheshire and Lörrach, Baden-Württemberg
- (England) Chesterfield, Derbyshire and Darmstadt, Hesse
- (England) Christchurch, Dorset and Aalen, Baden-Württemberg
- (England) Cirencester, Gloucestershire and Itzehoe, Schleswig-Holstein
- (England) Cleethorpes, North East Lincolnshire and Königswinter, North Rhine-Westphalia
- (England) Colchester, Essex and Wetzlar, Hesse
- (England) Coventry, West Midlands and Dresden, Saxony, and Kiel, Schleswig-Holstein
- (England) Crawley, West Sussex and Dorsten, North Rhine-Westphalia
- (England) Darlington, County Durham and Mülheim an der Ruhr, North Rhine-Westphalia
- (England) Derby, Derbyshire and Osnabrück, Lower Saxony
- (England) Devizes, Wiltshire and Waiblingen, Baden-Württemberg
- (England) Dronfield, Derbyshire and Sindelfingen, Baden-Württemberg
- (Scotland) Dundee and Würzburg, Bavaria
- (Scotland) Dunfermline and Wilhelmshaven, Lower Saxony
- (England) Durham and Tübingen, Baden-Württemberg
- (England) Ealing, London and Steinfurt, North Rhine-Westphalia
- (Scotland) Edinburgh and Munich, Bavaria
- (Scotland) Elgin, Moray and Landshut, Bavaria
- (England) Ellesmere Port, Cheshire and Reutlingen, Baden-Württemberg
- (Northern Ireland) Enniskillen, County Fermanagh and Brackwede, Bielefeld, North Rhine-Westphalia
- (England) Epping, Essex and Eppingen, Baden-Württemberg
- (England) Exeter, Devon and Bad Homburg vor der Höhe, Hesse
- (England) Fareham, Hampshire and Pulheim, North Rhine-Westphalia
- (England) Felixstowe, Suffolk and Wesel, North Rhine-Westphalia
- (Scotland) Glasgow and Nuremberg, Bavaria
- (England) Glossop, Derbyshire and Bad Vilbel, Hesse
- (England) Gloucester, Gloucestershire and Trier, Rhineland-Palatinate
- (England) Grantham, Lincolnshire and Sankt Augustin, North Rhine-Westphalia
- (England) Greenwich, London and Reinickendorf, Berlin
- (England) Guildford, Surrey and Freiburg im Breisgau, Baden-Württemberg
- (England) Halifax, West Yorkshire and Aachen, North Rhine-Westphalia
- (England) Hammersmith and Fulham, London and Neukölln, Berlin
- (England) Hartlepool, County Durham and Hückelhoven, North Rhine-Westphalia
- (England) Havering, London and Ludwigshafen am Rhein, Rhineland-Palatinate
- (England) Hemel Hempstead and Dacorum, Hertfordshire and Neu Isenburg, Hesse
- (England) Hereford, Herefordshire and Dillenburg, Hesse
- (England) Herne Bay, Kent and Waltrop, North Rhine-Westphalia
- (England) Henley on Thames, Oxfordshire and Leichlingen, North Rhine-Westphalia
- (England) High Wycombe, Buckinghamshire and Kelkheim, Hesse
- (England) Hillingdon, London and Schleswig, Schleswig-Holstein
- (England) Hinckley, Leicestershire and Herford, North Rhine-Westphalia
- (England) Hitchin, Hertfordshire and Bingen am Rhein, Rhineland-Palatinate
- (England) Hurst Green, East Sussex and Ellerhoop, Schleswig-Holstein
- (England) Ilfracombe, Devon and Herxheim bei Landau/Pfalz, Rhineland-Palatinate
- (Scotland) Inverness and Augsburg, Bavaria
- (England) Kendal, Cumbria and Rinteln, Lower Saxony
- (England) Kettering, Northamptonshire and Lahnstein, Rhineland-Palatinate
- (England) Kidderminster, Worcestershire and Husum, Schleswig-Holstein
- (Scotland) Kilmarnock, Ayrshire and Kulmbach, Bavaria
- (England) Kingsbridge, Devon and Weilerbach, Rhineland-Palatinate
- (England) King's Lynn, Norfolk and Emmerich am Rhein, North Rhine-Westphalia
- (Scotland) Kirkcaldy, Fife and Ingolstadt, Bavaria
- (England) Knaresborough, North Yorkshire and Bebra, Hesse
- (England) Lancaster, Lancashire and Rendsburg, Schleswig-Holstein
- (England) Leeds, West Yorkshire and Dortmund, North Rhine-Westphalia
- (England) Leicester, Leicestershire and Krefeld, North Rhine-Westphalia
- (Scotland) Leven, Fife and Holzminden, Lower Saxony
- (England) Lewisham, London and Charlottenburg-Wilmersdorf, Berlin
- (England) Lichfield, Staffordshire and Limburg an der Lahn, Hesse
- (England) Lincoln, Lincolnshire and Neustadt an der Weinstraße, Rhineland-Palatinate
- (England) Littlehampton, West Sussex and Durmersheim, Baden-Württemberg
- (England) Liverpool and Cologne, North Rhine-Westphalia
- (England) London and Berlin
- (England) Loughborough, Leicestershire and Schwäbisch Hall, Baden-Württemberg
- (England) Luton, Bedfordshire and Bergisch Gladbach, North Rhine-Westphalia
- (England) Maidenhead, Berkshire and Bad Godesberg, North Rhine-Westphalia
- (England) Manchester and Chemnitz, Saxony
- (England) Margate, Kent and Idar-Oberstein, Rhineland-Palatinate
- (England) Middlesbrough, North Yorkshire and Oberhausen, North Rhine-Westphalia
- (England) Milton Keynes, Buckinghamshire and Bernkastel-Kues, Rhineland-Palatinate
- (England) Morley, West Yorkshire and Siegen, North Rhine-Westphalia
- (Scotland) Motherwell, Lanarkshire and Schweinfurt, Bavaria
- (England) Newcastle upon Tyne, Tyne and Wear and Gelsenkirchen, North Rhine-Westphalia
- (England) Northampton, Northamptonshire and Marburg, Hesse
- (England) Norwich, Norfolk and Koblenz, Rhineland-Palatinate
- (England) Nottingham, Nottinghamshire and Karlsruhe, Baden-Württemberg
- (England) Nuneaton and Bedworth, Warwickshire and Cottbus, Brandenburg
- (England) Oakham, Rutland and Barmstedt, Schleswig-Holstein
- (England) Oxford, Oxfordshire and Bonn, North Rhine-Westphalia
- (Scotland) Paisley, Renfrewshire and Fürth, Bavaria
- (Scotland) Perth, Perth and Kinross and Aschaffenburg, Bavaria
- (England) Peterlee, County Durham and Nordenham, Lower Saxony
- (England) Portsmouth, Hampshire and Duisburg, North Rhine-Westphalia
- (England) Potton, Bedfordshire and Langenlonsheim, Rhineland-Palatinate
- (England) Preston, Lancashire and Recklinghausen, North Rhine-Westphalia
- (Scotland) Prestwick, South Ayrshire and Lichtenfels, Bavaria
- (England) Reading, Berkshire and Düsseldorf, North Rhine-Westphalia
- (England) Redcar and Cleveland, North Yorkshire and Troisdorf, North Rhine-Westphalia
- (England) Reigate, Surrey and Eschweiler, North Rhine-Westphalia
- (England) Richmond upon Thames, London and Konstanz, Baden-Württemberg
- (England) Rossendale, Lancashire and Bocholt, North Rhine-Westphalia
- (England) Royal Tunbridge Wells, Kent and Wiesbaden, Hesse
- (England) Borough of Runnymede, Surrey and Bergisch Gladbach, North Rhine-Westphalia
- (England) Rushmoor, Hampshire and Oberursel, Hesse
- (England) Sheffield, South Yorkshire and Bochum, North Rhine-Westphalia
- (England) Skipton, North Yorkshire and Simbach am Inn, Bavaria
- (England) Solihull, West Midlands and Main-Taunus-Kreis, Hesse
- (England) South Tyneside, Tyne and Wear and Wuppertal, North Rhine-Westphalia
- (England) Spalding, Lincolnshire and Speyer, Rhineland-Palatinate
- (England) St Albans, Hertfordshire and Worms, Rhineland-Palatinate
- (England) St. Helens, Merseyside and Stuttgart, Baden-Württemberg
- (England) Stafford, Staffordshire and Dreieich, Hesse
- (England) Stevenage, Hertfordshire and Ingelheim am Rhein, Bielefeld, Rhineland-Palatinate
- (England) Stockport, Greater Manchester and Heilbronn, Baden-Württemberg
- (England) Stoke-on-Trent, Staffordshire and Erlangen, Bavaria
- (England) Sunderland, Tyne and Wear and Essen, North Rhine-Westphalia
- (England) Sutton, London and Charlottenburg-Wilmersdorf, Berlin, and Minden, North Rhine-Westphalia
- (Wales) Swansea, West Glamorgan and Mannheim, Baden-Württemberg
- (England) Todmorden, West Yorkshire and Bramsche, Lower Saxony
- (England) Torbay, Devon and Hamelin, Lower Saxony
- (Scotland) Thurso, Caithness and Brilon, North Rhine-Westphalia
- (England) Truro, Cornwall and Boppard, North Rhine-Westphalia
- (England) Uckfield, East Sussex and Quickborn, Pinneberg, Schleswig-Holstein
- (England) Wallingford, Oxfordshire and Bad Wurzach, Baden-Württemberg
- (England) Waltham Forest, London and Wandsbek, Hamburg
- (England) Wantage, Oxfordshire and Seesen, Lower Saxony
- (England) Ware, Hertfordshire and Wülfrath, North Rhine-Westphalia
- (England) Warwick, Warwickshire and Verden (Aller), Lower Saxony
- (England) Waverley, Surrey and Mayen-Koblenz, Rhineland-Palatinate
- (England) Waterlooville, Hampshire and Henstedt-Ulzburg, Schleswig-Holstein
- (England) Watford, Hertfordshire and Mainz, Rhineland-Palatinate
- (England) Wellingborough, Northamptonshire and Wittlich, Rhineland-Palatinate
- (England) Weston-super-Mare, North Somerset and Hildesheim, Lower Saxony
- (England) Weymouth, Dorset and Holzwickede, North Rhine-Westphalia
- (England) Whitstable, Kent and Borken, North Rhine-Westphalia
- (England) Isle of Wight and Coburg, Bavaria
- (England) Windsor, Berkshire and Goslar, Lower Saxony
- (England) Witney, Oxfordshire and Unterhaching, Bavaria
- (England) Woking, Surrey and Rastatt, Baden-Württemberg
- (England) Wokingham, Berkshire and Erftstadt, North Rhine-Westphalia
- (England) Worcester, Worcestershire and Kleve, North Rhine-Westphalia
- (England) Workington, Cumbria and Selm, North Rhine-Westphalia
- (England) York, North Yorkshire and Münster, North Rhine-Westphalia

== See also ==
- Foreign relations of Germany
- Foreign relations of the United Kingdom
- Anglo-German naval arms race
- Causes of World War I
- German entry into World War I
- History of German foreign policy
- International relations of the Great Powers (1814–1919)
- Timeline of British diplomatic history
- United Kingdom–European Union relations
- Anglo-German Fellowship
- Anglo-Prussian alliance
- Propose Britain joining Germano-Italian Pact of Steel
- British-German Society
- Centre for Anglo-German Cultural Relations
- British Forces Germany
- Two World Wars and One World Cup
- England–Germany football rivalry
- British migration to Germany
- Germans in the United Kingdom
- List of ambassadors of Germany to the United Kingdom
- List of diplomats of the United Kingdom to Germany
