= Deutsch-Englische Gesellschaft =

The Deutsch-Englische Gesellschaft (German-English Society) was the German sister organization of the Anglo-German Fellowship. It was formed in Berlin, Germany, around 1935, under support of the Dienststelle Ribbentrop. The Dienststelle Ribbentrop was created by Joachim von Ribbentrop in 1935, and was to function parallel to the German foreign ministry. Using unconventional diplomacy, the Dienststelle was to sway British-German relations.
