= Trinity House Agreement =

The Trinity House Agreement (German: Trinity-House-Vereinbarung) was signed by the German Defense Minister, Boris Pistorius, and the British Secretary of State for Defence, John Healey, in London on October 23, 2024, to strengthen bilateral security cooperation and to "deepen defence cooperation across all domains". It is named after Trinity House, the place of the signing. It sets the course for closer cooperation in the defense and security policy of both countries and is intended to be an expression of the UK's realignment with Europe.

== Projects ==
The agreement contains specific points for closer cooperation in all dimensions (air, land, sea, space and cyber defence):

- Strengthening the defence industry in both countries
- Strengthening the eastern flank of NATO
- Development of new long-range strike weapons. Stealth and hypersonic weapons with a range of more than 2000 km. Expected to come into service in the 2030s, it will be among the most advanced system ever designed in the UK.
- Protection of critical underwater infrastructure
- Surveillance flights by the Marineflieger from Scotland (RAF Lossiemouth)
- Unmanned aerial systems and their networking (for GCAP and FCAS programmes)
- Cooperation on air defence systems
- Continued support for Ukraine
- New discussion formats for collaboration
