= List of ambassadors of Germany to the United Kingdom =

Ambassador of Germany to the United Kingdom
- Deutscher Botschafter im Vereinigten Königreich

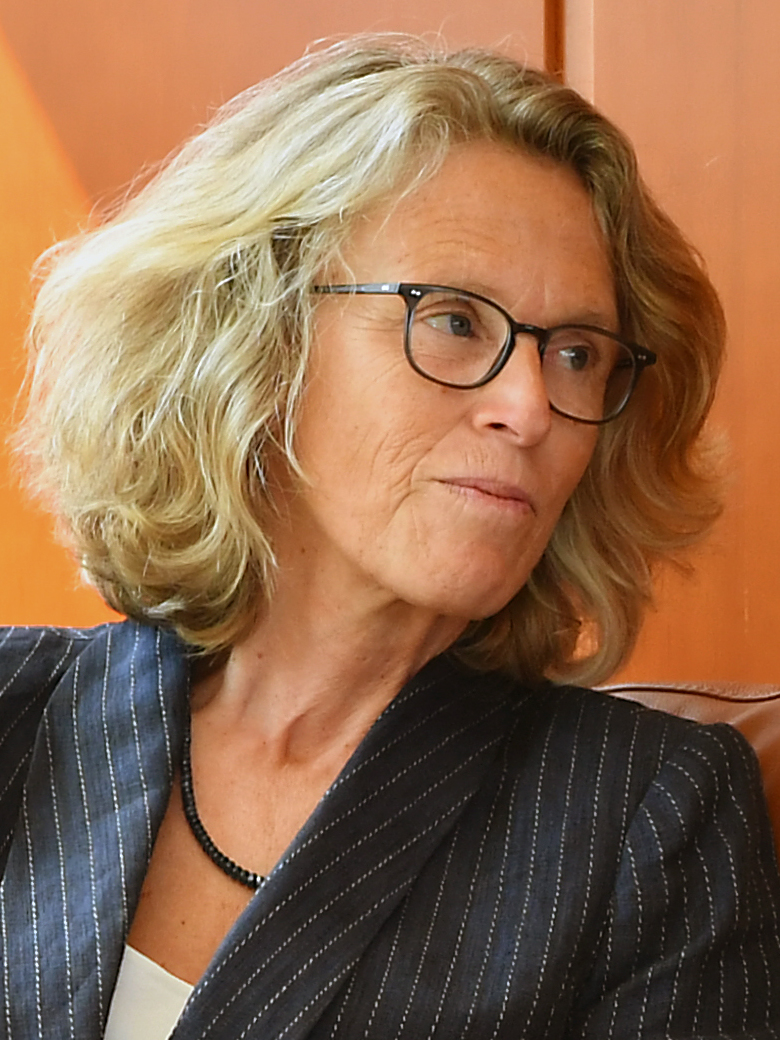
- Incumbent; Susanne Baumann since September 2025
- Residence: London
- Inaugural holder: Albrecht von Bernstorff
- Formation: 1871

Germany and the United Kingdom have had diplomatic relations since German unification in 1871. Prior to this, several independent German states including Prussia, Bavaria, Saxony, Württemberg, the Grand Duchy of Hesse, and the Hanseatic cities of Bremen, Hamburg, and Lübeck had diplomatic relations with the United Kingdom, alongside the German Confederation (1815–1866) and North German Confederation (1867–1871).

== Envoys of the German states ==
=== Saxony ===
- 1671: establishment of diplomatic relations

Envoys of the Electorate of Saxony

- 1699–1710: Karl Christian Kirchner
- 1710–1714: Charles Pierre d'Elorme
- 1714–1718: Georg Sigismund von Nostitz
- 1718–1718: Karl Philipp von Wartensleben-Flodroff
- 1718–1728: Jacques le Coq
- 1730–1732: Friedrich Carl von Watzdorf
- 1733–1733: Heinrich von Buenau
- 1733–1738: Johann Adolph von Loss
- 1739–1742: Adam Adolph von Utterodt
- 1742–1751: Karl Georg Friedrich von Flemming
- 1752–1757: Carl Ludwig Wiedmarckter (as chargé d'affaires)
- 1757–1763:
- 1763–1763: Johann Georg von Einsiedel
- 1764–1806: Hans Moritz von Brühl

Envoys of the Kingdom of Saxony

- 1806-1809: Hans Moritz von Brühl
- 1809-1815:
- 1815-1816: Carl von Friesen
- 1816-1823: Wilhelm August von Just
- 1823-1824: Maximilian von Schreibershofen
- 1824-1832: Friedrich Bernhard Biedermann
- 1832-1846: Georg Rudolf von Gersdorff
- 1846-1853: Friedrich Ferdinand von Beust
- 1853-1869: Karl Friedrich Vitzthum von Eckstaedt
- 1869-1874: Oswald von Fabrice
- 1874: dissolution of the embassy

=== Hanover ===
- 1702 Ernst August von Platen-Hallermund

=== Holstein-Gottorp ===
- 1713–1714 Gerhard Nath (1666–1740)
- 1714–1719 Hermann von Petkum

=== Electorate of the Palatinate ===
- 1715–1716 Franz Ludwig Viktor Effern

=== Trier ===
- 1715 Hermann Beveren

=== Bavaria ===
- 1692: Opening of diplomatic mission
- 17??–1739: Johann Franz von Haslang
- 1739–1783: Joseph Franz Xaver von Haslang (ca. 1700–1783)
- 1783–1803: Siegmund von Haslang (1740–1803)
- 1800–1801: Franz Gabriel von Bray (1765–1832)
- 1804–1814: Interruption of diplomatic relations, due to alliance with France during Napoleonic Wars
- 1814–1822: Christian Hubert Pfeffel von Kriegelstein (1765–1834)
- 1822–1833: August Baron de Cetto (1794–1879)
- 1833–1835: Franz Oliver von Jenison-Walworth (1787–1867)
- 1835–1867: August Baron de Cetto (1794–1879)
- 1868–1871: Ferdinand von Hompesch-Bollheim (1824–1913)
- 1871: Closure of legation

=== Brandenburg-Prussia ===
- 1604 Hans von Bodeck (1582–1658)
- 1651–1655:
- 1655–16??: Johann Friedrich Schlezer (1610–1673)
- 1671–1675: Lorenz Georg von Krockow (1638–1702)
- 1675–1678: Otto von Schwerin (1645–1705)
- 1678–1682:
- 1682–1685: Pierre de Falaiseau (1649–1726)
- 1685–1686: Johann von Besser (1654–1729)
- 16??–16??: Wolfgang von Schmettau (1648–1711)
- 16??–1688: Samuel von Schmettau (1657–1709)
- 1688–1697: Thomas Ernst von Danckelmann (1638–1709)
- 1697–1698: Friedrich Bogislaw Dobrženský von Dobrženitz (k.A.)
- 1698–1699: Christoph I. zu Dohna-Schlodien (1665–1733)
- 1700–1700: David Ancillon the Younger (1670–1723)

=== Envoys Extraordinary of Prussia ===
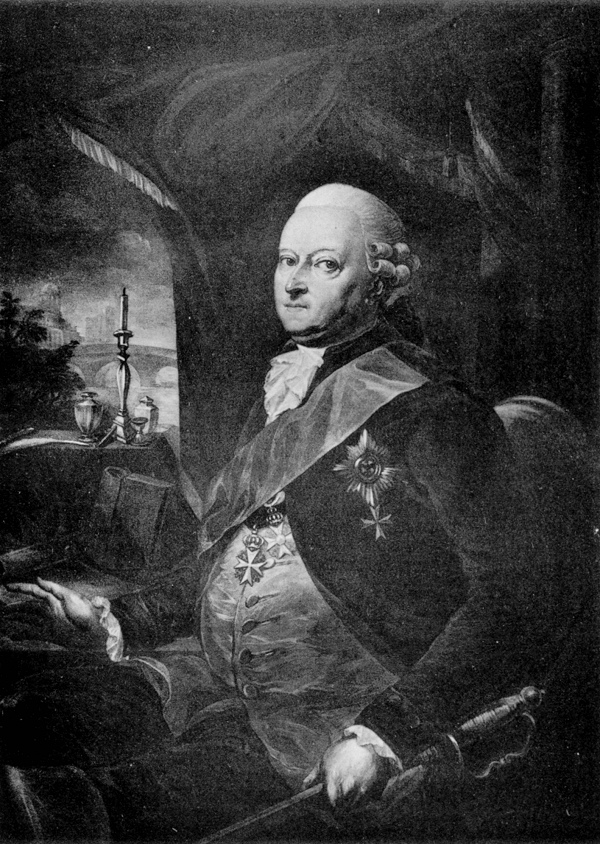
Count Karl-Wilhelm Finck von Finckenstein

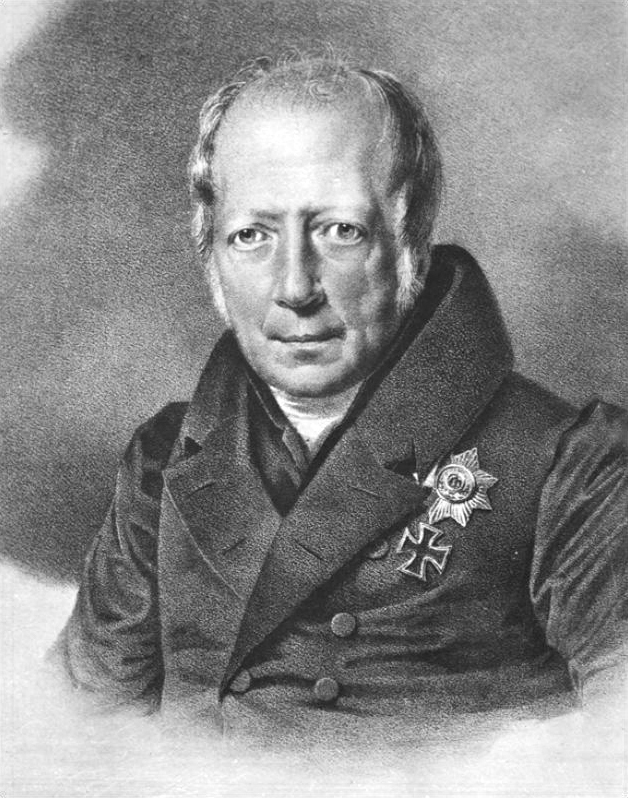
Count Wilhelm von Humboldt

- 1707–1710: Ezechiel von Spanheim (1629–1710)
- 1711–1712: Johann August Marschall von Bieberstein (1672–1736)
- 1712–1719: Ludwig-Friedrich Bonnet de Saint-Germain (1670–1761)
- 1719–1726: Johann Christoph Julius Ernst von Wallenrodt (1670–1727)
- 1726–1730: Benjamin Friedrich von Reichenbach (1697–1750)
- 1730–1733: Christoph Martin von Degenfeld-Schonburg (1689–1762)
- 1733–1737: Caspar Wilhelm von Borcke (1704–1747)
- 1737–1742:
- 1742–1744: Count Karl-Wilhelm Finck von Finckenstein (1714–1800)
- 1744–1748:
- 1748–1750: Joachim Wilhelm von Klinggräff (1692–1757)
- 1750–1758: Abraham Louis Michell, Chargé d'affaires (1712–1782)
- 1758–1760: Dodo Heinrich zu Innhausen und Knyphausen (1729–1789)
- 1760–1764: Abraham Louis Michell (1712–1782)
- 1764-1766:
- 1766–1780: Joachim Carl von Maltzan (1733–1817)
- 1780–1788: Spiridion von Lusi (1741–1815)
- 1788–1790: Philipp Karl von Alvensleben (1745–1802)
- 1790–1792: Sigismund Ehrenreich Johann von Redern (1761–1841)
- 1792–1807: Constans Philipp Wilhelm von Jacobi-Klöst (1745–1817)
- 1807–1815:
- 1815–1817: Constans Philipp Wilhelm von Jacobi-Klöst (1745–1817)
- 1817–1818: Wilhelm von Humboldt (1767–1835)
- 1818–1821: vacant
- 1821–1824: Heinrich Wilhelm von Werther (1772–1859)
- 1824–1827: Bogislaw von Maltzan (1793–1833)
- 1827–1841: Heinrich von Bülow (1791–1845)
- 1841–1854: Christian Charles Josias Bunsen (1791–1860)
- 1854–1861: Albrecht von Bernstorff (1809–1873)
- 1861–1862: vacant
- 1862–1873: Albrecht von Bernstorff (1809–1873), 2nd term

== Ambassadors of Germany ==
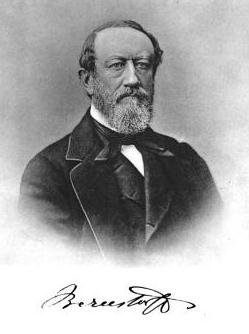
The first Ambassador from the German Empire, Albrecht von Bernstorff

=== North German Confederation (1867–1871) ===
- Albrecht von Bernstorff

=== German Reich (1871–1945) ===
==== German Empire (1871–1918) ====
1. Albrecht von Bernstorff (1871–1873)
2. Georg Herbert zu Münster (1873–1885)
3. Paul von Hatzfeldt (1885–1901)
4. Paul Wolff Metternich (1901–1912)
5. Adolf Marschall von Bieberstein (1912)
6. Karl Max, Prince Lichnowsky (1912–1914)

diplomatic relations disrupted due to World War I

==== Weimar Republic (1919–1933) ====
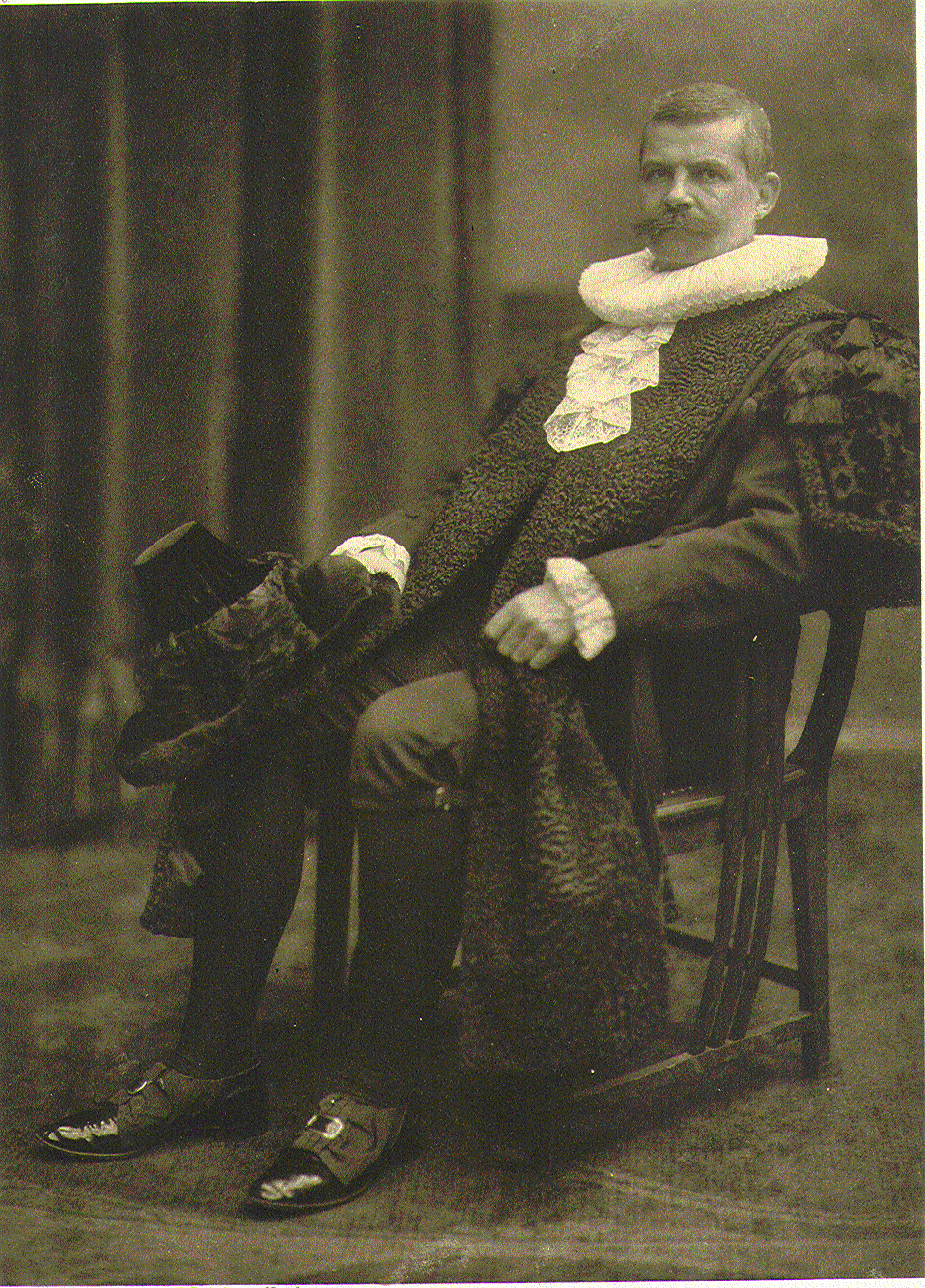
The Weimar Republic Ambassador from 1920 to 1930, Friedrich Sthamer

1. Friedrich Sthamer (1920–1930) (chargé d'affaires from 1919)
2. Konstantin von Neurath (1930–1932)
3. Leopold von Hoesch (1932–1933)

==== Nazi Germany (1933–1945) ====
1. Leopold von Hoesch (1933–1936)
2. Joachim von Ribbentrop (1936–1938)
3. Herbert von Dirksen (1938–1939)

diplomatic relations disrupted due to World War II

=== German Democratic Republic (1949–1990) ===
1. Karl-Heinz Kern (1971–1980)
2. Martin Bierbach (1980–1984)
3. Gerhard Lindner (1984–1989)
4. Joachim Mitdank (1989–1990)
5. Ulrike Birkner (1990; until 2 October)

=== Federal Republic of Germany (since 1949) ===
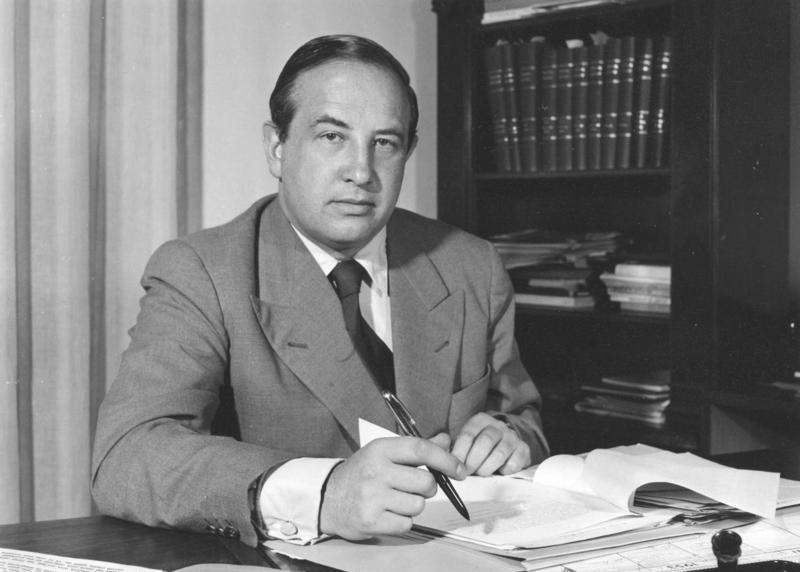
The German Ambassador from 1967 to 1970, Herbert Blankenhorn

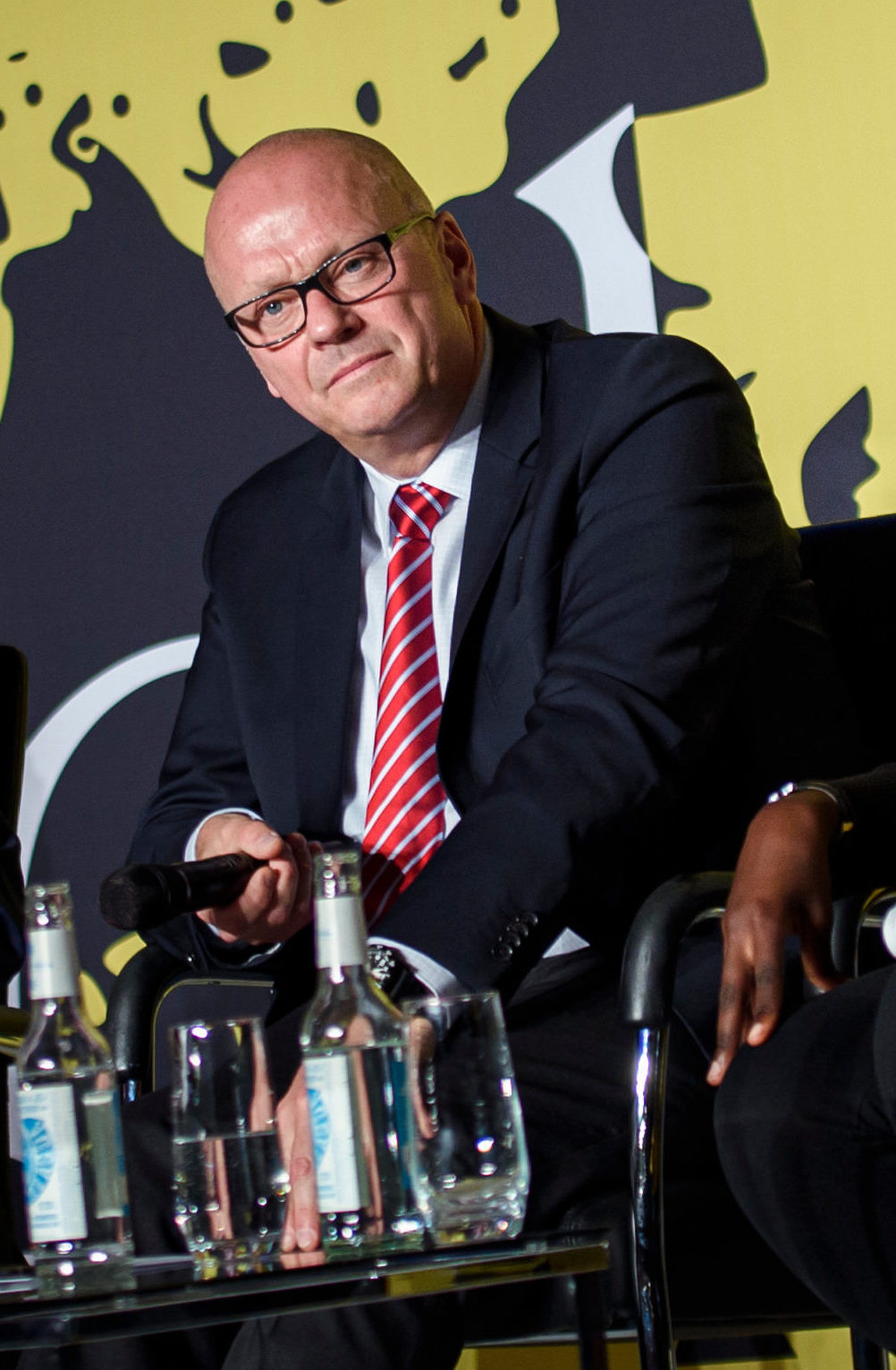
The German Ambassador from 2020 to 2022, Andreas Michaelis

1. Hans Schlange-Schöningen (1950–1955)
2. Hans Heinrich Herwarth von Bittenfeld (1955–1961)
3. Hasso von Etzdorf (1961–1965)
4. Herbert Blankenhorn (1965–1970)
5. Karl-Günther von Hase (1970–1977)
6. Hans Helmut Ruethe (1977–1980)
7. Jürgen Ruhfus (1980–1983)
8. Rüdiger von Wechmar (1985–1989)
9. Hermann von Richthofen (1989–1993)
10. Peter Hartmann (1993–1995)
11. Jürgen Oesterhelt (1995–1997)
12. Gebhardt von Moltke (1997–1999)
13. Hans-Friedrich von Ploetz (1999–2002)
14. Thomas Matussek (2002–2006)
15. Wolfgang Ischinger (2006–2008)
16. Georg Boomgaarden (2008–2014)
17. Peter Ammon (2014–2018)
18. Peter Wittig (2018–2020)
19. Andreas Michaelis (2020–2022)
20. Miguel Berger (2022-2025)
21. Susanne Baumann (2025-)

== See also ==
- Embassy of Germany, London
- List of diplomats of the United Kingdom to Germany
