= Andreas Michaelis =

German diplomat

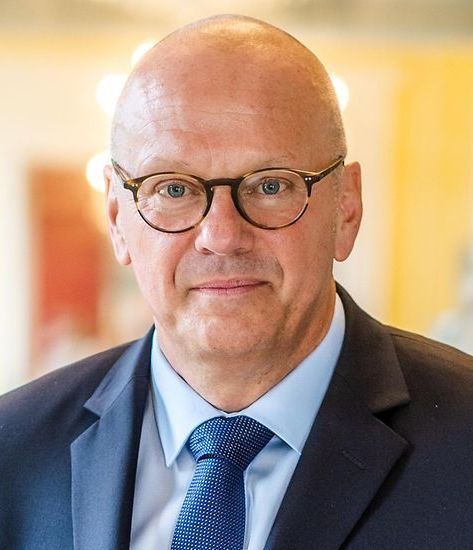

German Ambassador to the United States
- In office August 2023 – June 2025
- President: Frank-Walter Steinmeier
- Preceded by: Emily Haber
- Succeeded by: Jens Hanefeld

German Ambassador to the Court of St. James's
- In office May 2020 – May 2022
- President: Frank-Walter Steinmeier
- Preceded by: Peter Wittig
- Succeeded by: Miguel Berger

Personal details
- Born: 24 July 1959 (age 67) Hannover, West Germany
- Children: 3
- Education: University of Hanover, University of Oxford

Andreas Michaelis (born 24 July 1959 in Hanover, Germany) is a German diplomat who served as State Secretary of the Federal Foreign Office in the government of Chancellor Olaf Scholz. From August 2023 to June 2025, he was the German Ambassador to the United States. From May 2020 until January 2022, he was the German Ambassador to the United Kingdom.

== Early life and education ==
After attending school in Hanover and completing his military service, he studied in Hanover and Oxford, gaining a Master's and a Master of Letters.

== Career ==
Michaelis joined the German diplomatic service in 1989. From 1991 to 1992 he worked in the office of Minister of State Helmut Schäfer at the Federal Foreign Office, and from 1992 to 1995 he was First Secretary Political Affairs at the German Embassy in Tel Aviv. From 1995 to 1998 he was in the Human Rights Task Force at the Federal Foreign Office.

Under Foreign Minister Joschka Fischer, he served from 1998 as Deputy Spokesman and from 1999 as Spokesman of the Federal Foreign Office. From 2002 to 2006 Michaelis was the German Ambassador to Singapore. From 2006 to 2007 he served as Director for Asian and Pacific Affairs and from 2007 to 2011 as Director for Middle Eastern Affairs and North Africa in Berlin. From July 2011 to July 2015 he was German Ambassador to Israel.

From 2015 to March 2018 Michaelis was Political Director of the Federal Foreign Office. In this role his responsibilities included the negotiations on the Ukraine dossier, on the implementation of the nuclear agreement with Iran and on a political solution to the Syria conflict.

From March 2018 to April 2020 Michaelis was one of two State Secretaries of the Federal Foreign Office. His predecessor Markus Ederer moved to Moscow as EU Ambassador. As State Secretary, Michaelis was responsible for, among other things, the Political Directorates-General at the Federal Foreign Office, and hence for European policy, relations with the USA and Russia, as well as Middle Eastern, Asian and African affairs. In autumn 2019, Michaelis, together with the Federal Chancellor’s foreign policy advisor, Jan Hecker, set up and led the Berlin Process, which in January 2020 led to the Berlin Conference on Libya, which established a ceasefire and created a roadmap for a transitional administration in Libya.

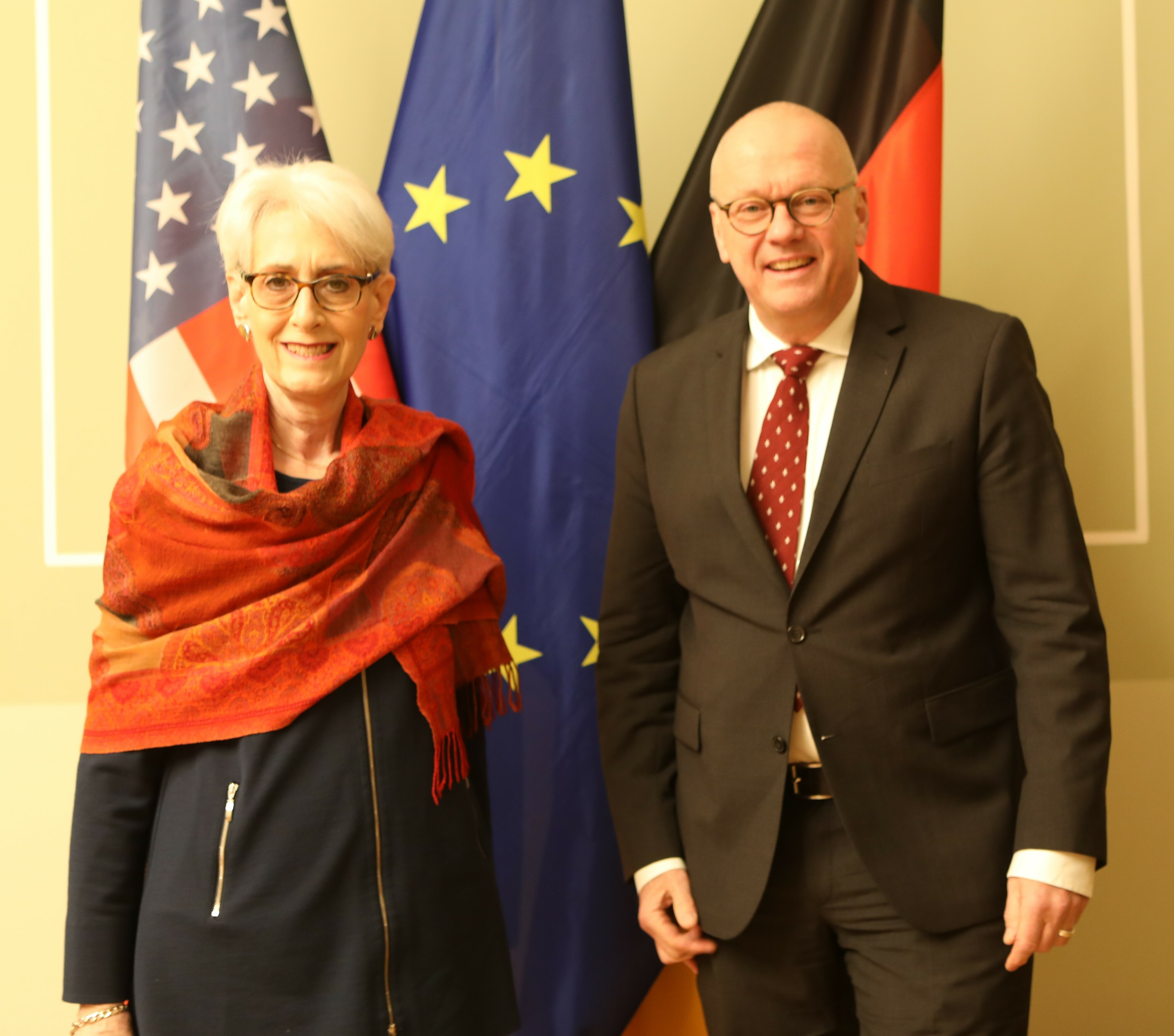
Michaelis with US Deputy Secretary of State Wendy Sherman in 2022

In January 2020 it was announced that Michaelis would succeed Peter Wittig as Ambassador in London. He took up the post in London in May 2020. He was succeeded as State Secretary by the Director-General for Economic Affairs at the Federal Foreign Office, Miguel Berger.

On 3 January, Michaelis was again appointed State Secretary of the Federal Foreign Office under Foreign Minister Annalena Baerbock.

From August 2023 to June 2025, he served as German Ambassador to the United States, succeeding Emily Haber. He formally presented his credentials to Ethan Rosenzweig, Acting Chief of Protocol of the United States' State Department, on August 3, 2023.

According to Reuters, in an article published on 19 January 2025, Michaelis warned that the incoming Trump administration would rob U.S. law enforcement and the media of their independence and hand big tech companies co-governing power. Reuters said a confidential briefing document, dated January 14 and signed by Michaelis, described Donald Trump's agenda for his second White House term as one of maximum disruption that would bring about "a redefinition of the constitutional order - maximum concentration of power with the president at the expense of Congress and the federal states."

== Recognition ==
Michaelis is an Honorary Fellow of Keble College, Oxford. He has received various decorations and honours including the Order of Merit of the Republic of Italy, the Order of Civil Merit of Spain and the French Legion of Honour.

== Personal life ==
Michaelis is married with three children. He is a fan and member of 1. FC Union Berlin.
