= List of ambassadors of Germany to Poland =

The list of German ambassadors in Poland contains the highest-ranking representatives of the German Empire and the Federal Republic of Germany in Poland. The embassy is located in Warsaw.

== History ==
The German Embassy is located at 12 Jazdów Street in Warsaw. There are Consulate Generals located in Wrocław (largest city in Silesia), Gdańsk (capital of the Pomeranian Voivodeship), and Kraków (the second-largest in Poland); Opole Consulate in Wrocław; and honorary consuls in Olsztyn (capital of the Warmian-Masurian Voivodeship), Bydgoszcz (the seat of Bydgoszcz County), Gliwice (regional capital of the Silesian Voivodeship), Kielce (capital of the Świętokrzyskie Voivodeship), Łódź (capital of Łódź Voivodeship), Lublin (the capital of Lublin Voivodeship), Poznań (administrative capital of Greater Poland Voivodeship), and Rzeszów (the capital of the Subcarpathian Voivodeship).

== Envoys from the German Empire ==
Name	Image	Term Start	Term End	Notes
Harry Kessler		1918	1918	Envoy for a month
Hans von Schoen		1921	1922	Envoy
Ulrich Rauscher		1922	1930	Envoy
Hans-Adolf von Moltke		1931	1939	1931 Envoy, 1934 Ambassador

== Ambassador of the Federal Republic of Germany ==
Name	Image	Term Start	Term End	Notes
Bernd Mumm von Schwarzenstein		1963	1966	Head of the commercial agency
Heinrich Böx		1966	1970	Head of the commercial agency
Egon Emmel		1970	1972	Head of trade mission
Hans Hellmuth Ruete		1972	1977	
Werner Ahrens		1977	1979	
Georg Negwer		1979	1983	
Horst Röding		1983	1985	
Franz Pfeffer		1985	1987	
Franz Jochen Schoeller		1987	1989	
Günter Knackstedt		1989	1992	
Franz Bertele		1992	1993	
Johannes Bauch		1993	1999	
Frank Elbe		1999	2003	Former ambassador to India, Japan, and Switzerland
Reinhard Schweppe		2003	2007	
Michael Gerdts		2007	2010	
Rüdiger von Fritsch		2010	2014	Became ambassador to Russia
Rolf Nikel		2014	2020	
Arndt Freytag von Loringhoven		2020	2022	Former NATO assistant secretary general for Intelligence and Security
Thomas Bagger		2022	2023	Became Secretary of State for Political Affairs in the Foreign Ministry
Viktor Elbling		2023	2025	Former ambassador to Mexico and Italy
Miguel Berger		2025		Former ambassador to the United Kingdom

== See also ==
- Poland–Germany relations
