= List of ambassadors of Germany to the Czech Republic =

This is a list of German ambassadors to the Czech Republic (and previously to Czechoslovakia).

== History ==
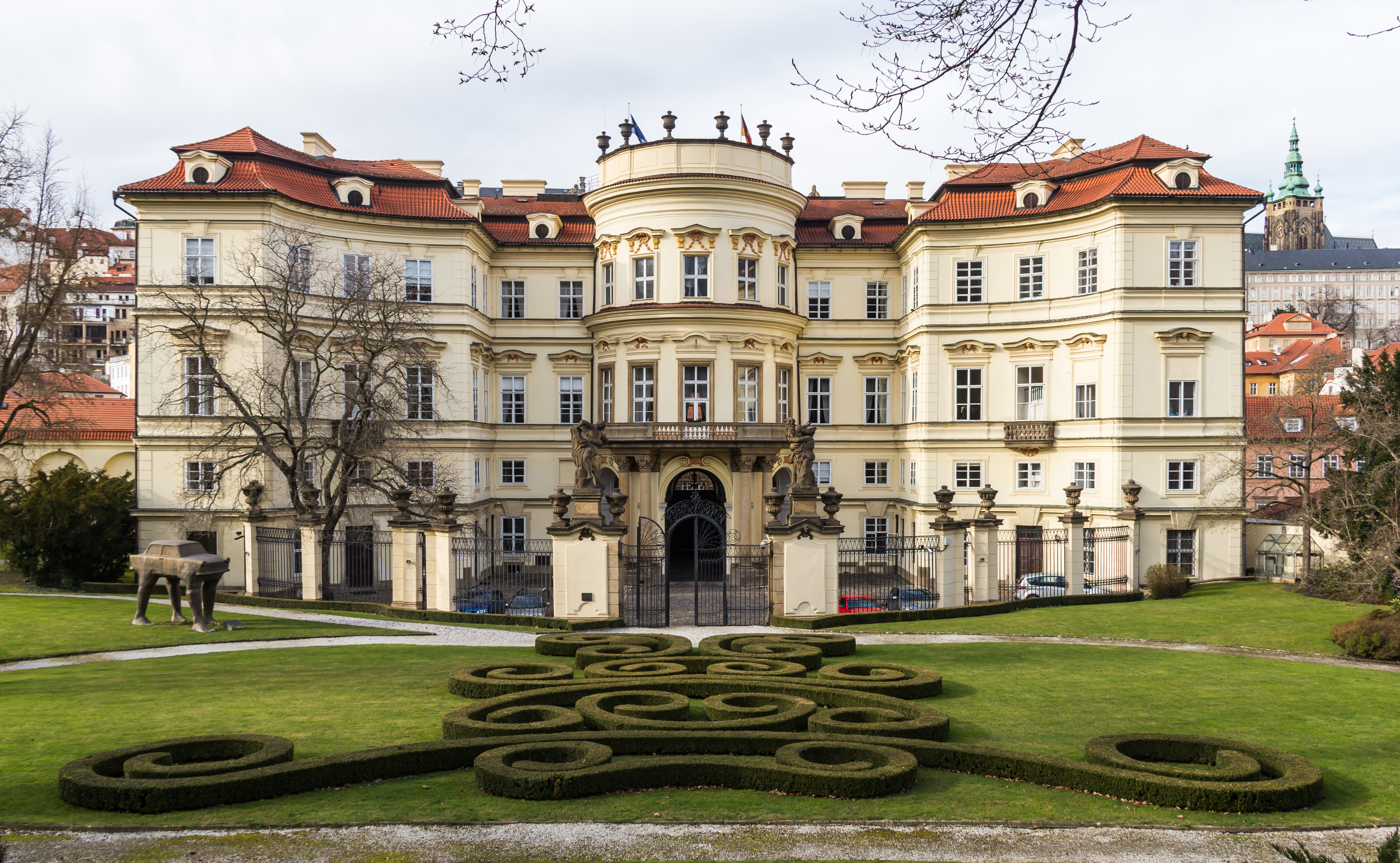
Photograph of the south side of German Embassy, Prague

Since the establishment of diplomatic relations between West Germany and Czechoslovakia in 1973, the German Embassy has occupied the Palais Lobkowicz, a Baroque palace with an extensive garden was completed in 1707, and located at Vlašská 19, Malá Strana, Prague. The palace was acquired by the House of Lobkowicz in 1753, who in 1927 sold it to the Czechoslovak state.

== Ambassadors to Czechoslovakia ==
| Name | Image | Term Start | Term End | Notes |
|---|---|---|---|---|
| Samuel Saenger | | 1919 | 1920 | |
| Walter Koch | | 1920 | 1935 | |
| Ernst Eisenlohr | | 1935 | 1938 | |
| Andor Hencke | | 1938 | 1939 | |
| Otto Erich Sigismund Heipertz | | 1973 | 1974 | |
| Gerhard Ritzel | | 1974 | 1977 | |
| Jürgen Diesel | | 1977 | 1982 | |
| Klaus Meyer | | 1982 | 1985 | |
| Werner Schattmann | | 1985 | 1988 | |
| Hermann Huber | | 1988 | 1992 | |
| Rolf Hofstetter | | 1992 | 1996 | |

== Ambassadors to the Czech Republic ==
| Name | Image | Term Start | Term End | Notes |
|---|---|---|---|---|
| Rolf Hofstetter | | 1992 | 1996 | |
| Anton Rossbach | | 1996 | 1998 | |
| Michael Steiner | | 1998 | 1998 | |
| Hagen Graf Lambsdorff | | 1999 | 2001 | Father of Alexander Graf Lambsdorff |
| Michael Libal | | 2001 | 2005 | |
| Helmut Elfenkämper | | 2005 | 2009 | |
| Johannes Haindl | | 2009 | 2011 | |
| Detlef Lingemann | | 2011 | 2014 | |
| Arndt Freytag von Loringhoven | | 2014 | 2016 | |
| Hansjörg Haber | | 2017 | 2017 | Managing; former ambassador to Yemen |
| Christoph Israng | | 2017 | 2021 | |
| Andreas Künne | | 2021 | Present | Former envoy and head of the Department of Economic and Global Affairs at the Embassy Pretoria in South Africa. |

== See also ==
- Czech Republic–Germany relations
