= Arndt Freytag von Loringhoven =

German diplomat and chemist (born 1956)

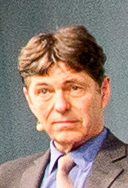

German Ambassador to Poland
- In office 2020–2022
- Preceded by: Rolf Nikel
- Succeeded by: Thomas Bagger

German Ambassador to the Czech Republic
- In office 2014–2016
- Preceded by: Detlef Lingemann
- Succeeded by: Hansjörg Haber

Personal details
- Born: 12 November 1956 (age 69) Munich
- Parent: Bernd Freytag von Loringhoven (father)
- Education: University of Oxford
- Profession: Diplomat, chemist

Arndt Freytag von Loringhoven (born 12 November 1956 in Munich) is a German diplomat and chemist. He formerly served as Germany's ambassador to Poland. Loringhoven was deputy director of Germany's Federal Intelligence Service (BND) between 2007 and 2010. He served as NATO's first chief of intelligence (1 December 2016 – 2019). He was also Germany's ambassador to the Czech Republic and served as a diplomat at the German Embassy in Moscow.

== Early life ==
Loringhoven was born in Munich on 12 November 1956. He is the son of the late German lieutenant-general Bernd Freytag von Loringhoven. He is an Oxford graduate and completed his PhD studies at the Max Planck Institute for Biochemistry in Martinsried in 1984.

== Career ==
After joining the German Foreign Ministry in 1986, he served as a diplomat at embassies in Paris and Moscow and he has also held several positions in the Foreign Ministry including Director of European Affairs.

In May 2017 he attended a panel debate about the counter-terrorism strategy of the NATO Civilian Intelligence Committee in the Croatian town of Opatija, where he also met with Croatian president Kolinda Grabar-Kitarović. In December 2017, he spoke at the Prague Insecurity Conference, saying that "hybrid threats" from Russia and terrorist groups were increasing. He argued that Russia was attempting to regain some of its waning influence in Europe using "hybrid tactics" which included the influencing of elections, cyberattacks and dissemination of fake news propaganda.

=== Ambassadorship ===
In August 2020, it was reported that Loringhoven had been appointed as the German ambassador to Poland by Heiko Maas, the Foreign Minister of Germany. Poland took additional time to consider giving him agrément. It was disputed whether the reason is Loringhoven's father's participation in the German invasion of Poland (although both Loringhoven and his father repudiated Nazism and extremism) or whether the conflict was due to Polish opposition to German-owned media operating in their country. Finally, on 15 September 2020, he presented his letter of credence to President Andrzej Duda.
