= Ludwig-Friedrich Bonnet de Saint-Germain =

Genevan physician, diplomat, lawyer, scholar and politician

Ludwig-Friedrich Bonnet de Saint-Germain, FRS (12 December 1670 – 7 April 1761) was a Genevan physician, lawyer, scholar, and politician. He was also a diplomat in the service of Prussia.

He was born in Geneva in 1670, into a family of French Protestants (Huguenots) from Provence, who had fled to Geneva during the French Wars of Religion and married there into the family of the eminent German Calvinist theologian Friedrich Spanheim. Ludwig-Friedrich Bonnet studied medicine at Leiden University. Both him and his older brother Frédéric then followed their uncle Ezekiel von Spanheim into the diplomatic service of the government of Prussia (officially Brandenburg-Prussia until 1701, afterwards the Kingdom of Prussia). Posted to England, he was known there as Louis Frederick Bonet.

In London, Bonnet concerned himself with church matters, including the relief of Huguenot refugees. He was a member of the Society for Promoting Christian Knowledge and received a doctorate of civil law from the University of Oxford in 1706. Bonnet became a fellow of the Royal Society in 1711, having been proposed by John Chamberlayne. He reported extensively to Berlin on contemporary parliamentary and financial matters in England. After his brother Frédéric's untimely death in 1694, Ludwig-Friedrich succeeded him as Brandenburg-Prussia's diplomatic resident in London.

In 1712, Bonnet sat in the Royal Society's committee that investigated the priority dispute between Isaac Newton and Gottfried Leibniz over the development of the calculus. That committee subscribed a report, which Newton himself had drafted, identifying Newton as "first inventor" of the calculus and absolving John Keill of libel against another fellow of the Royal Society for having suggested that Leibniz might have taken some of his results from Newton's unpublished letters. In 1713 Bonnet was elected as a foreign member of the Prussian Academy of Sciences. In 1715 he was awarded the Prussian Ordre de la Générosité.

Under the terms of the parliamentary Act of Settlement 1701, the British throne passed in 1714 to a Protestant German prince, the Elector of Hanover, who reigned as George I of Great Britain. In 1716, the King in Prussia, Frederick William, appointed Bonnet as his ambassador extraordinary to the new British court (the Court of St James's).

Bonnet returned to Geneva in 1720. After 1739 he served in the Council of Two Hundred of the Republic of Geneva. He died in Geneva in 1761.
