= Herbert Blankenhorn =

German diplomat (1904–1991)

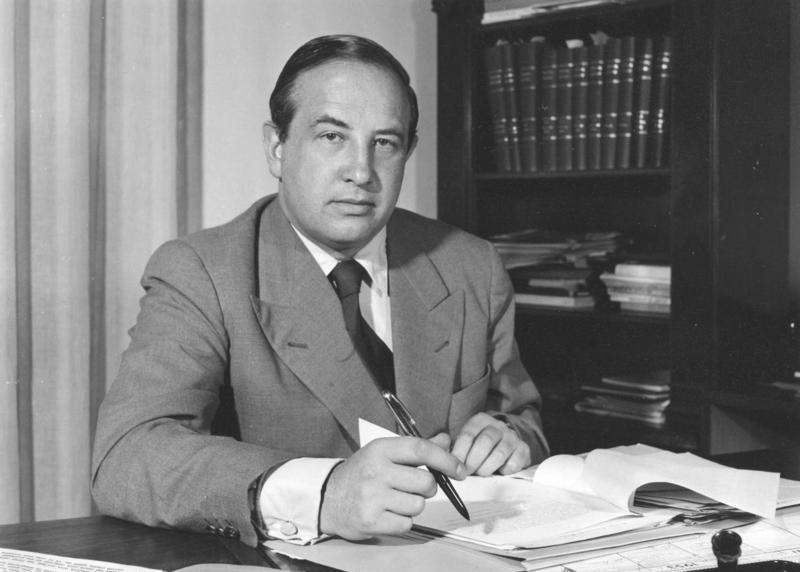
Herbert Blankenhorn (1953)

Herbert Blankenhorn (15 December 1904 in Mülhausen – 10 August 1991 in Badenweiler) was a German diplomat. From 1929 he was member of the Foreign Office, and from 1938 was a member of the Nazi Party (NSDAP). At the time, he was counsellor in the German legation in Bern, Switzerland. Philippe Mottu had been encouraged by Canon de Bavier, the Procurator of the Abbey of St. Maurice in the Vatican, to meet him as he was in reality an anti-Nazi. Mottu says, 'At the moment when the Third Reich was triumphant on the battlefield, he explained to me why, according to his conviction, Germany was going to lose the war. It was my first contact with one of the men who took part in the German resistance.' [Philippe Mottu, ‘Caux is the place!’, Caux Doc, 1997, p. 10-11] According to Roger Peyrefitte in Propos Secrets volume 2, Blankenhorn was a German diplomat at the embassy in Greece, where they established an intense platonic relationship. In 1943, he launched the economy department of the German legation in Bern and was Head of the Foreign Office. After 1945 he became one of the most influential German professional diplomats. He joined the CDU in 1946 and served as the West German ambassador to Italy, France(1963-1965) and the United Kingdom (1965–1970). He was the son of officer Karl Blankenhorn (1878-1963).
