= Georg Herbert Münster =

Hanoverian and later German diplomat and politician

Georg Herbert Münster Prince of Münster Count of Münster-Ledenburg
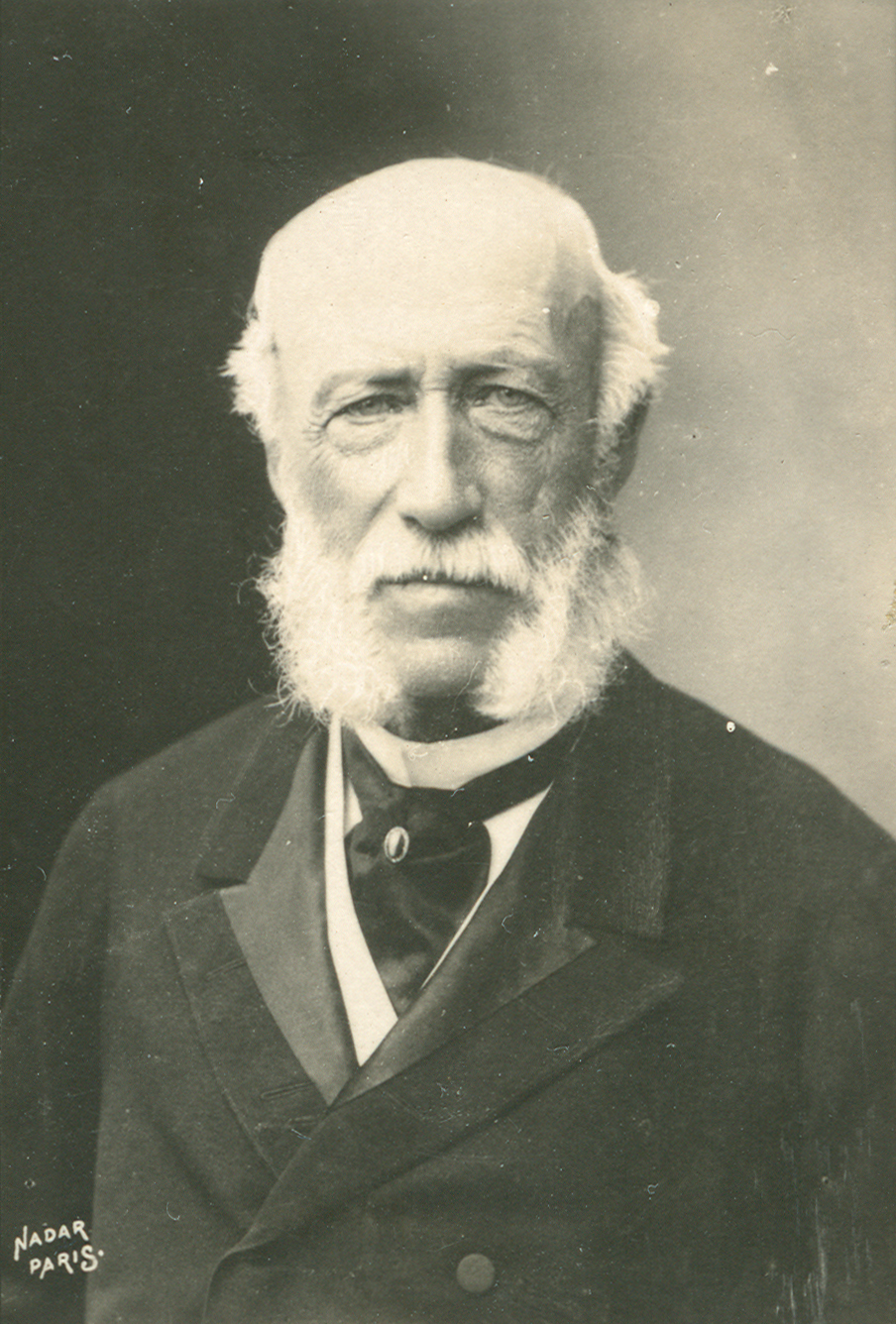

German Ambassador to France
- In office 1885–1900
- Preceded by: Chlodwig, Prince of Hohenlohe-Schillingsfürst
- Succeeded by: Hugo von Radolin

German Ambassador to the Court of St. James
- In office 1873–1885
- Appointed by: Otto von Bismarck
- Preceded by: Albrecht von Bernstorff
- Succeeded by: Paul von Hatzfeldt

Hanoverian Minister in Saint Petersburg
- In office 1857–1865
- Preceded by: Alexander Thal
- Succeeded by: Victor von Alten

Personal details
- Born: Georg Herbert zu Münster; 23 December 1820 London, England
- Died: 28 March 1902 (aged 81) Hanover
- Spouse(s): Alexandra, Princess Dolgorukova (after 1847) Lady Elizabeth St Clair-Erskine (after 1865)
- Children: Alexander Münster
- Parent(s): Ernst zu Münster; Wilhelmine Charlotte von Lippe-Alverdissen
- Education: University of Bonn; University of Heidelberg; University of Göttingen
- Awards: Order of the Black Eagle

Georg Herbert Fürst zu Münster von Derneburg (Note: His title was given as "The Count Munster" in the official British Government translations from the French of the treaties he signed at the Congress of Vienna (see for example Treaty between Prussia and Hanover, 29 May 1815).) (23 December 1820 – 28 March 1902), also known by his earlier title of Count of Münster-Ledenburg, was a Hanoverian and later German diplomat and politician. He served as ambassador to London 1873–1885 and Paris (1885–1900).

== Early life and education ==
Münster was born in London, where his father, Count Ernst zu Münster, was the Hanoverian Minister at the Court of King George IV. His mother was Countess Wilhelmine Charlotte von Lippe-Alverdissen, Countess zu Münster (a daughter of Philip II, Count of Schaumburg-Lippe and Landgravine Juliane of Hesse-Philippsthal). Among his maternal family was uncle George William, Prince of Schaumburg-Lippe (and his wife Princess Ida of Waldeck and Pyrmont). His paternal grandparents were Count Georg von Münster zu Surenburg and Eleonore von Grothaus (the eldest daughter of the general Ernst Philipp von Grothaus). His grandfather was known for collecting fossils in the Muschelkalk around the town of Bayreuth in Bavaria for more than 25 years.

He studied law at the universities of Bonn, Heidelberg, and Göttingen. At 18, he inherited the family's considerable estate and hereditary seat in the Hanoverian parliament, the Estates Assembly of the Kingdom of Hanover. He also followed his father into the Hanoverian diplomatic service.

== Career ==
From his father, Münster inherited strong Guelph sympathies and conservative viewpoints. During the German revolutions of 1848–49, he opposed reforms and the abolition of privileges for the nobility, and he voted against giving the Hanoverian National Assembly to right to pass laws for Hanover. During the early years of his own career, these family traditions kept him closely attached to the Hanoverian dynasty. Prom 1856–64, he was the Hanoverian Minister in Saint Petersburg, the same post his father had held 50 years prior. In 1866, Münster tried and failed via diplomatic channels to bring understanding between Hanover and Prussia, and the latter annexed the former as a result of the Austro-Prussian War.

His subsequent rise in the Prussian diplomatic service was met with reproach by the Guelphs, but Münster was convinced that Germany could only be saved by strong Prussian leadership. "My conception of a true Hanoverian," he wrote, "is that he must be first of all a German." Münster represented the town of Goslar in the Reichstag from 1867–73, when he was appointed by Otto von Bismarck to succeed Albrecht von Bernstorffat the Court of St James's.

Münster spent the next 28 years in London and Paris, and Münster contributed substantially to smoothing over many minor conflicts between France and Germany. He represented the German Empire at the 1889 Hague Convention, after which he received the title of Prince. In 1900, he was awarded the Order of the Black Eagle. In December 1901, he retired to his villa in Hanover.

== Personal life ==
Münster was twice married. In 1847, he married Alexandra, Dowager Princess Dolgorukova (1823–1884), widow of Dmitry Nikolaevich Dolgorukov; née Princess Golitsyn, daughter of Prince Mikhail Mikhailovich Golitsyn (1793–1856) and Princess Maria Arkadievna Souvorov-Rimnisky. They were the parents of:

- Countess Sophie Helene Thusnelde Wilhelmine zu Münster (1851–1933), who married Baron Konrad von Beneckendorff und von Hindenburg, cousin of the famous statist Paul von Hindenburg.
- Prince Ernst Adolf zu Münster von Grothaus (1856–1905), who married Princess Melanie Ghika de Dezsanfalva.
- Count Alexander Otto Hugo Wladimir zu Münster (1858–1922), who married Lady Muriel Henrietta Constance Hay (1863–1927), the youngest daughter of George Hay-Drummond, 12th Earl of Kinnoull, in 1890.

On 22 August 1865, he married secondly to Lady Elizabeth St Clair-Erskine at Dysart House. Lady Elizabeth was the only daughter of James St Clair-Erskine, 3rd Earl of Rosslyn and his wife, the former Frances Wemyss.

Prince Münster died on 28 March 1902 in Hanover.

== Honours and awards ==
He received the following orders and decorations:

- Kingdom of Prussia:
  - Knight of the Prussian Crown, 1st Class with Enamel Band of the Red Eagle, 18 January 1877
  - Grand Commander's Cross of the Royal House Order of Hohenzollern, 31 October 1885
  - Knight of the Black Eagle, with Collar, 1900
- (Saxe-Coburg and Gotha) (Duchy of Saxe-Altenburg) (Saxe-Meiningen) Ernestine duchies: Grand Cross of the Saxe-Ernestine House Order
- France: Grand Cross of the Legion of Honour
- Kingdom of Hanover: Commander of the Royal Guelphic Order, 1st Class
- (Principality of Schaumburg-Lippe) Lippe: Cross of Honour of the House Order of Lippe, 1st Class
- Mecklenburg: Grand Cross of the Wendish Crown, with Golden Crown
- Persian Empire: Order of the Lion and the Sun, 1st Class
- Kingdom of Portugal: Grand Cross of the Immaculate Conception of Vila Viçosa
- Russian Empire: Knight of St. Anna, 1st Class
- Saxe-Weimar-Eisenach: Grand Cross of the White Falcon
- Württemberg: Grand Cross of the Württemberg Crown

== Notes ==
Diplomatic posts
Preceded by Alexander Thal	Hanoverian Minister in Saint Petersburg; 1857–1865	Succeeded by Victor von Alten
Preceded by Albrecht von Bernstorff	German Ambassador to the Court of St. James; 1873–1885	Succeeded by Paul von Hatzfeldt
Preceded by Chlodwig, Prince of Hohenlohe-Schillingsfürst	German Ambassador to France; 1885–1900	Succeeded by Hugo von Radolin
