= Peter Wittig =

German diplomat

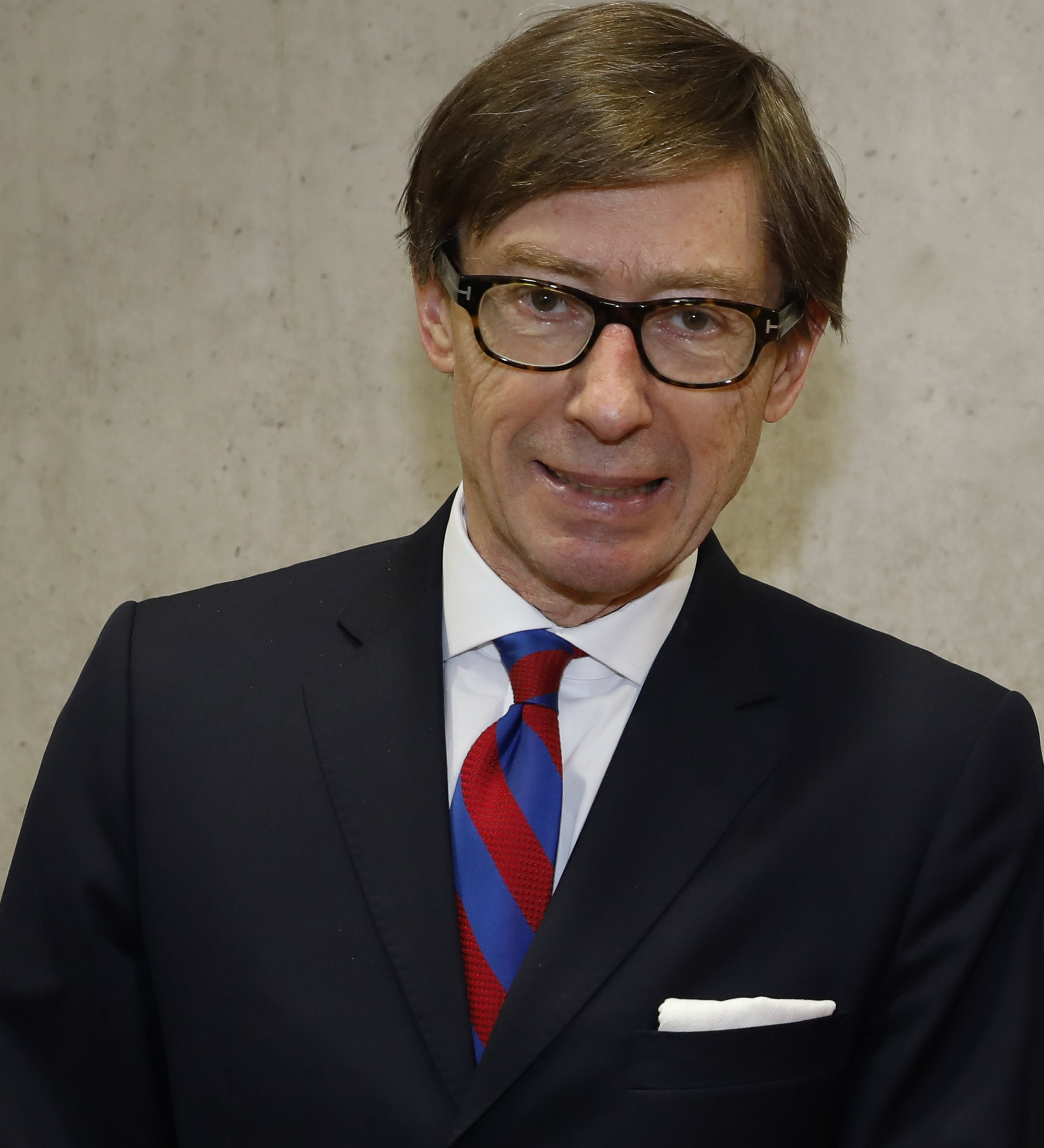

German Ambassador to the Court of St. James's
- In office 2 July 2018 – April 2020
- President: Frank-Walter Steinmeier
- Preceded by: Peter Ammon
- Succeeded by: Andreas Michaelis

German Ambassador to the United States
- In office 30 April 2014 – 20 June 2018
- President: Joachim Gauck; Frank-Walter Steinmeier
- Preceded by: Peter Ammon
- Succeeded by: Emily Haber

German Ambassador to the United Nations
- In office November 2009 – 30 April 2014
- President: Horst Köhler; Christian Wulff; Joachim Gauck
- Preceded by: Thomas Matussek
- Succeeded by: Harald Braun

Personal details
- Born: 11 August 1954 (age 72) Bonn, West Germany (now Bonn, Germany)
- Spouse: Huberta von Voss
- Children: 4
- Education: University of Bonn; University of Freiburg; University of Kent; Nuffield College, Oxford (PhD)
- Website: German Missions in the United Kingdom

Peter Wittig (born 11 August 1954) is a former German diplomat who was Ambassador to the United Kingdom from July 2018, to April 2020, after having served as Ambassador to the United States from 30 April 2014, to 20 June 2018 and Permanent Representative at the United Nations in New York from 2009 to 2014.

== Early life and education ==
Wittig studied at the University of Bonn, the University of Freiburg, University of Kent, and the University of Oxford. He has taught as an assistant professor at the University of Freiburg.

== Diplomatic career ==
After joining the German foreign service in 1982, Wittig served as German ambassador to Lebanon and to Cyprus.

In 2009 Wittig was appointed to serve as Germany's permanent representative to the United Nations. Wittig has served twice as the President of the United Nations Security Council, once in July 2011 and again in September 2012. Between 2011 and 2012, he headed among other committees the Al-Qaida Sanctions Committee.

From April 2014 to June 2018 Wittig served as the German ambassador to the United States and then moved to London where he served as Germany's ambassador to the Court of St. James until his retirement from diplomatic services end April 2020.

In May 2020 he joined Scheffler Group in Germany to build up and lead a new division about global affairs. Besides that he has plans to do some academic work.

== Other activities ==
- Atlantik-Brücke Foundation, member of the board of trustees
- International Journalists’ Programmes, Arthur F. Burns Fellowship Program, member of the board of trustees (2014–2018)

== Awards ==
- Leo Baeck Medal (2018)
