= Embassy of Germany, Prague =

Embassy of Germany in Prague
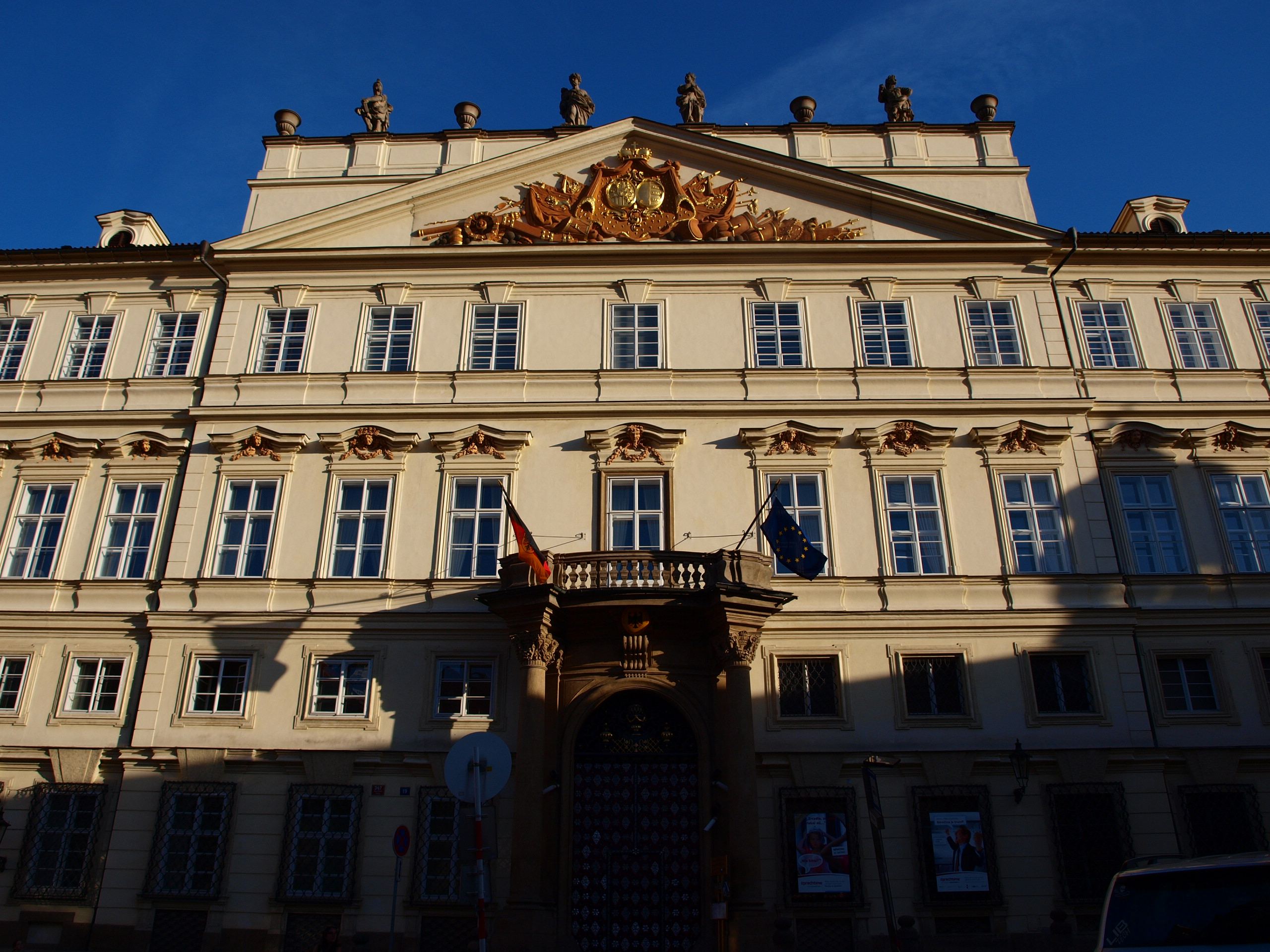
- Location: Malá Strana, Prague
- Address: Vlašská 19; Postbox 88; 118 01 Praha 1
- Coordinates: 50°05′13.43″N 14°23′53.34″E
- Ambassador: Andreas Künne

The Embassy of Germany (Czech: Německé velvyslanectví, German: Deutsche Botschaft Prag) is the diplomatic mission of Germany to the Czech Republic. It is located on Vlašská street (formerly Wälsche Spitalgasse), in the Malá Strana district of Prague, Czech Republic.

Since the establishment of diplomatic relations between West Germany and Czechoslovakia in 1973, it has occupied the large Palais Lobkowicz. The Baroque palace with an extensive garden was finished in 1707. It was acquired by the noble House of Lobkowicz in 1753, who in 1927 sold it to the Czechoslovak state.

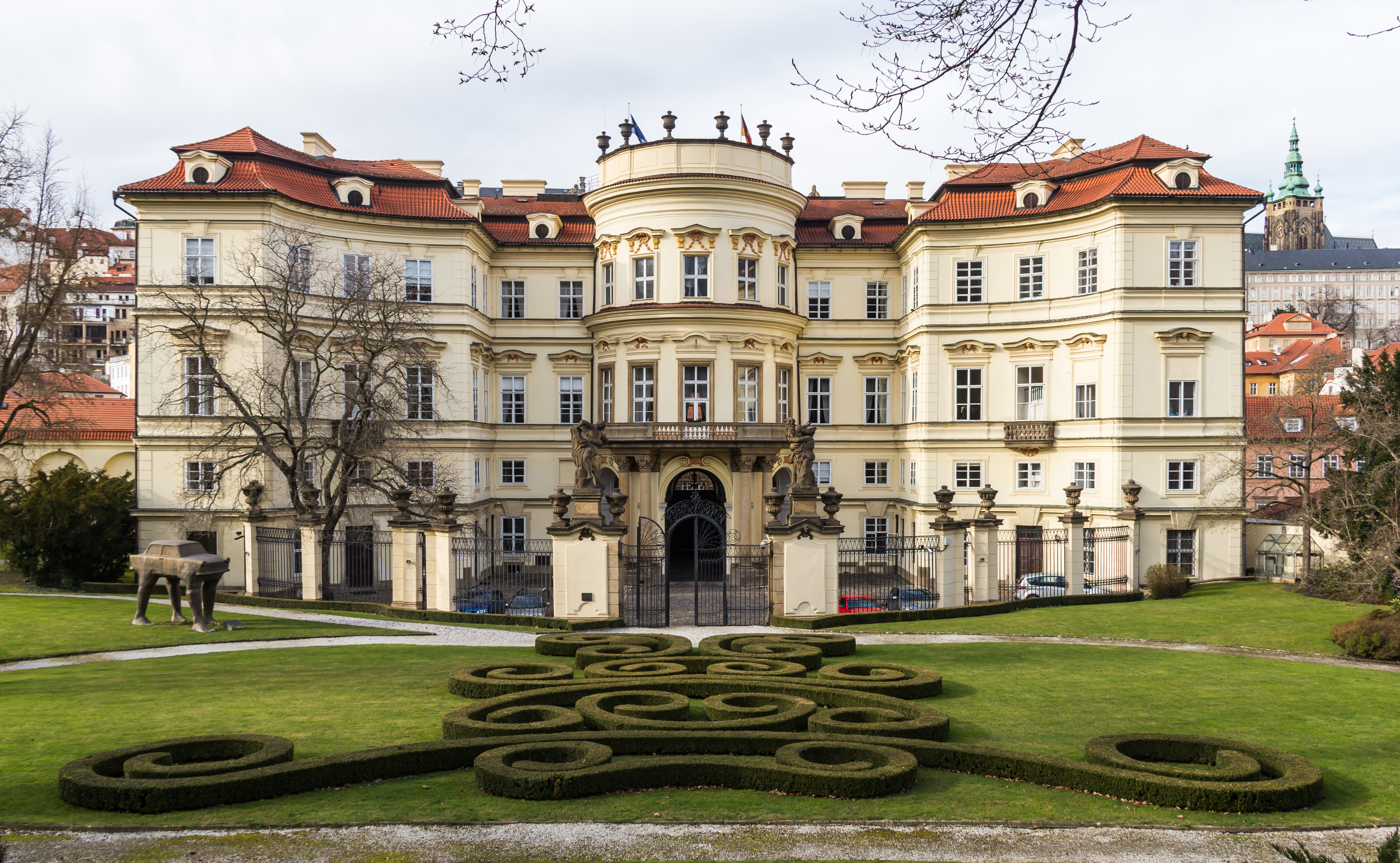
South side of German Embassy, with the garden in which the refugees were camping

== East German refugees ==
In the eve of the Revolutions of 1989, the palais became the resort of numerous East German refugees who had reached Prague, climbed over the fence and camped out in the grounds. While there were small groups hiding there occasionally since the embassy was opened in 1974, the number rose to several thousands in September, causing serious problems of supply and hygiene.

Behind the scenes the West German government negotiated with East German authorities and the Soviet Union how to solve these worsening conditions. When Foreign Minister Hans-Dietrich Genscher in the evening of 30 September stepped on the balcony to announce an agreement on the refugees' voyage to West Germany, the crowd cheered on the keyword Ausreise (departure). This event marked an emotional and significant moment in German history.

Until 3 November when the East German authorities closed the border with Czechoslovakia, many more GDR citizens fled to the embassy in the following weeks, wearing down the patience of the Czechoslovak authorities which gave in eventually, letting all East Germans travel directly to West Germany. Thus, they broke their part of the Iron Curtain, the Czechoslovak border fortifications during the Cold War. On 9 November 1989, the Berlin Wall fell, and the Czechs would succeed in the Velvet Revolution.

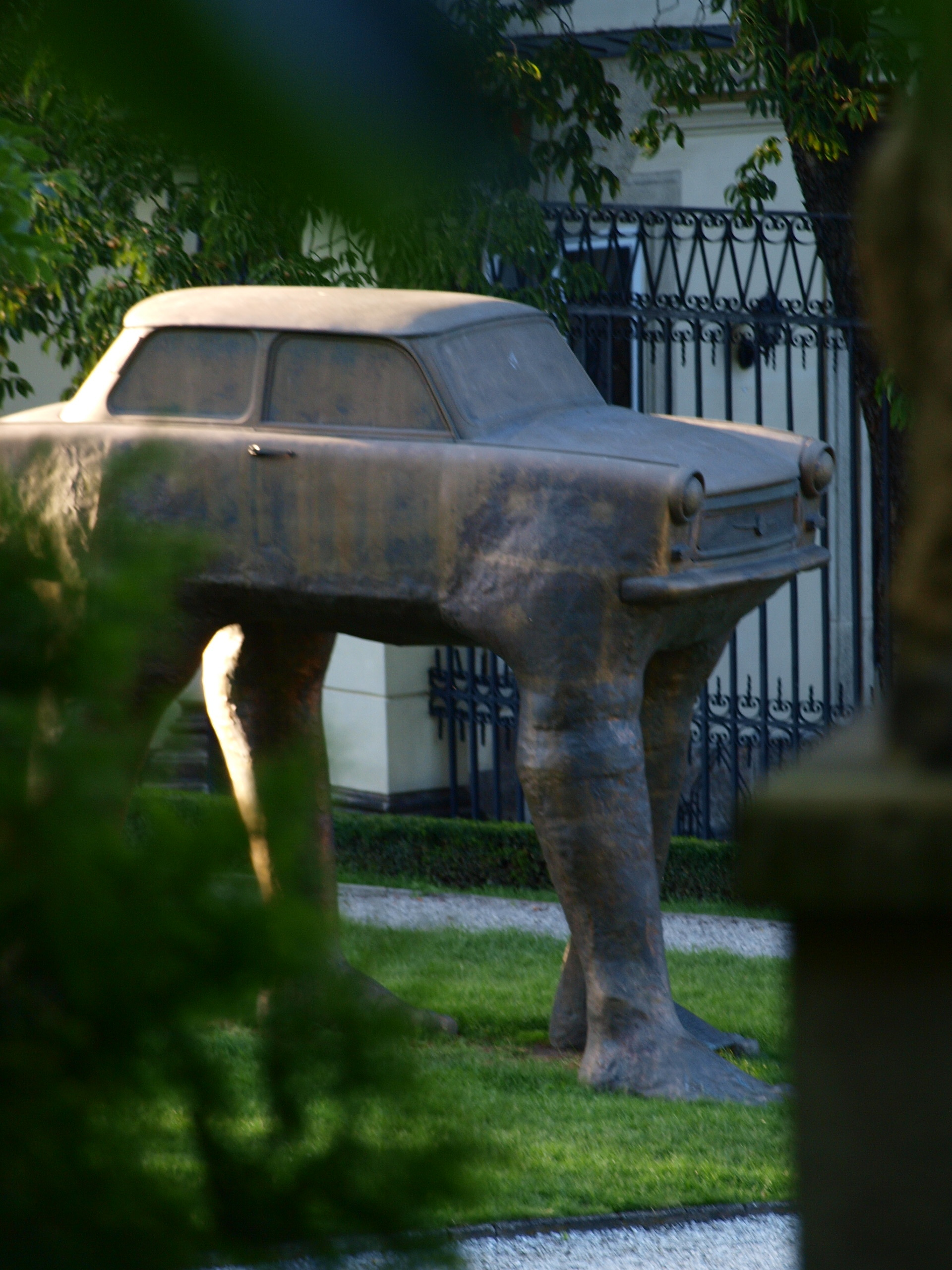
David Černý's sculpture commemorating East German refugees' stay in the embassy grounds

These events are commemorated by a golden statue of a Trabant car on four legs in the garden of the embassy. The sculpture is the work of the Czech sculptor David Černý.

== See also ==
- List of ambassadors of Germany to the Czech Republic
