= Emily Haber =

German diplomat

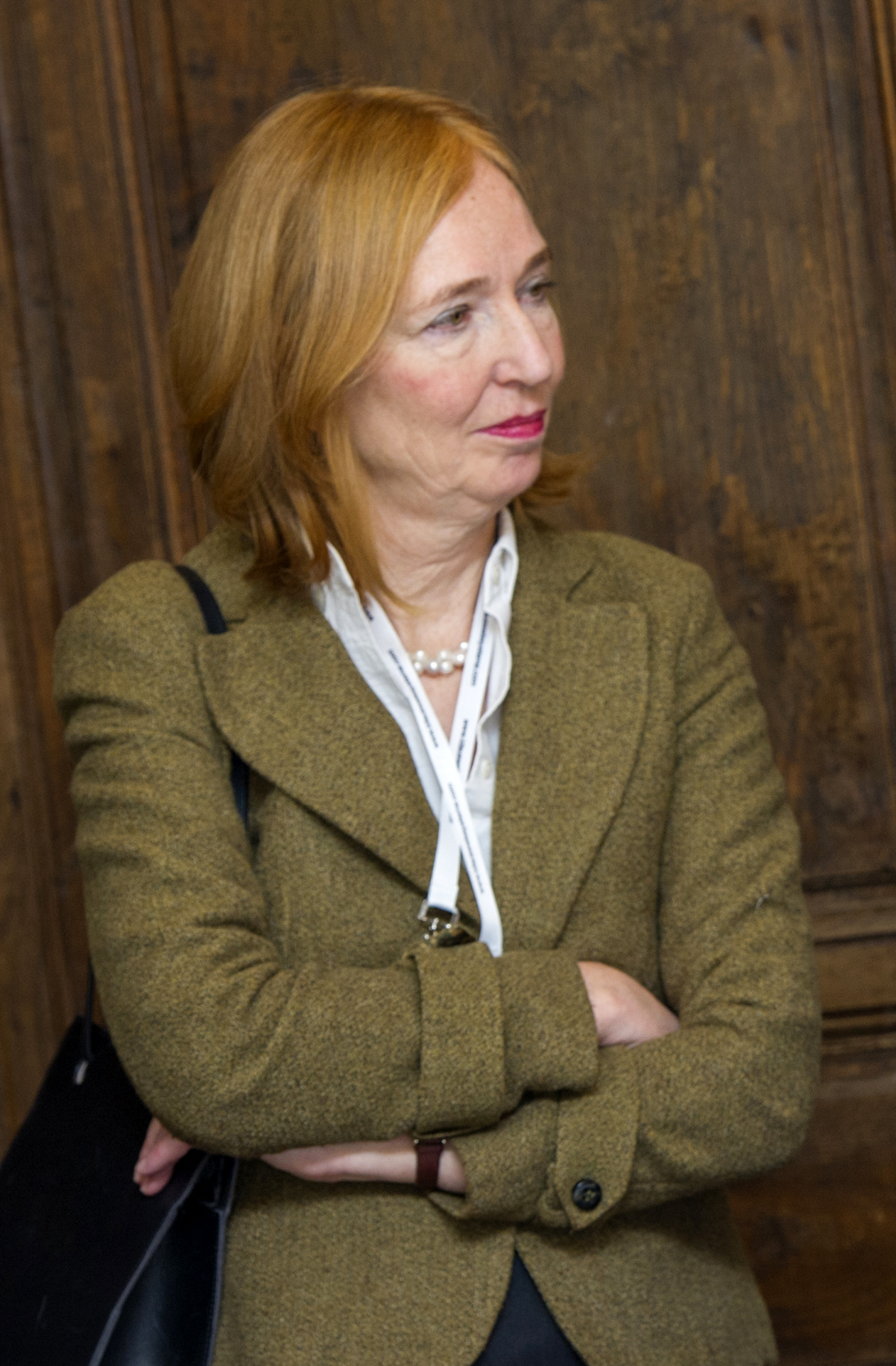

German Ambassador to the United States
- In office 22 June 2018 – 30 June 2023
- President: Frank-Walter Steinmeier
- Preceded by: Peter Wittig
- Succeeded by: Andreas Michaelis

Personal details
- Born: 1956 (age 69–70) Bonn, West Germany
- Children: 2
- Education: University of Cologne

Emily Margarethe Haber (née Oncken; born in 1956) is a German diplomat. She served as State Secretary from 2011 to 2018: from 2011 to 2013, at the Federal Foreign Office and from 2014 to 2018, at the Federal Ministry of the Interior.

She served as the German Ambassador to the United States from June 2018 until her retirement in June 2023. She was succeeded in the role by Andreas Michaelis.

== Early life and education ==
Emily Haber is the daughter of the German diplomat Dirk Oncken. From 1975 to 1980, she studied history and ethnology in Cologne, earning her PhD with a dissertation on German foreign policy during the Agadir Crisis.

== Career ==
After joining the German Foreign Service, Haber worked as a desk officer in the Federal Foreign Office division covering relations to the Soviet Union, as a political affairs officer at the German Embassy in Moscow, as cultural affairs officer at the German Embassy in Ankara, and as Deputy Head of the Cabinet and Parliamentary Liaison Division of the Federal Foreign Office in Bonn. In 1999, she returned to the German Embassy in Moscow, serving first as Head of the Economic Affairs Section, then as Head of the Political Affairs Department, until 2002. From 2002 to 2006, she served as Director of the OSCE Division and Commissioner for Conflict Prevention and Crisis Management in the Euro-Atlantic Framework at the Federal Foreign Office in Berlin. Thereafter, she assumed the function of Commissioner for Southeastern Europe and Turkey, serving from 2006 to 2009.

From 2009 to 2011, Haber served as Director-General for Political Affairs of the Federal Foreign Office in Berlin, becoming the first woman to hold this post. She was appointed to the position of State Secretary of the Federal Foreign Office by Minister Guido Westerwelle in 2011, again becoming the first woman to assume this role. From 2014 to 2018, she served as State Secretary of the Federal Ministry of the Interior under the leadership of Minister Thomas de Maizière, where she was responsible for security, migration, and integration. During her tenure as State Secretary, she has been criticized for her involvement in the treason investigation against Netzpolitik.org journalists, having failed to escalate the investigation to the Minister Thomas de Maizière.

Haber became the German Ambassador to the United States on June 22, 2018, and served until her retirement from the German foreign service on June 30, 2023.

== Other activities ==
- International Journalists’ Programmes, Arthur F. Burns Fellowship Program, Member of the Board of Trustees
- German Institute for International and Security Affairs (SWP), Member of the Council (2014-2018)

== Personal life ==
She is married to the German diplomat Hansjörg Haber.
