= Peter Ammon =

German diplomat

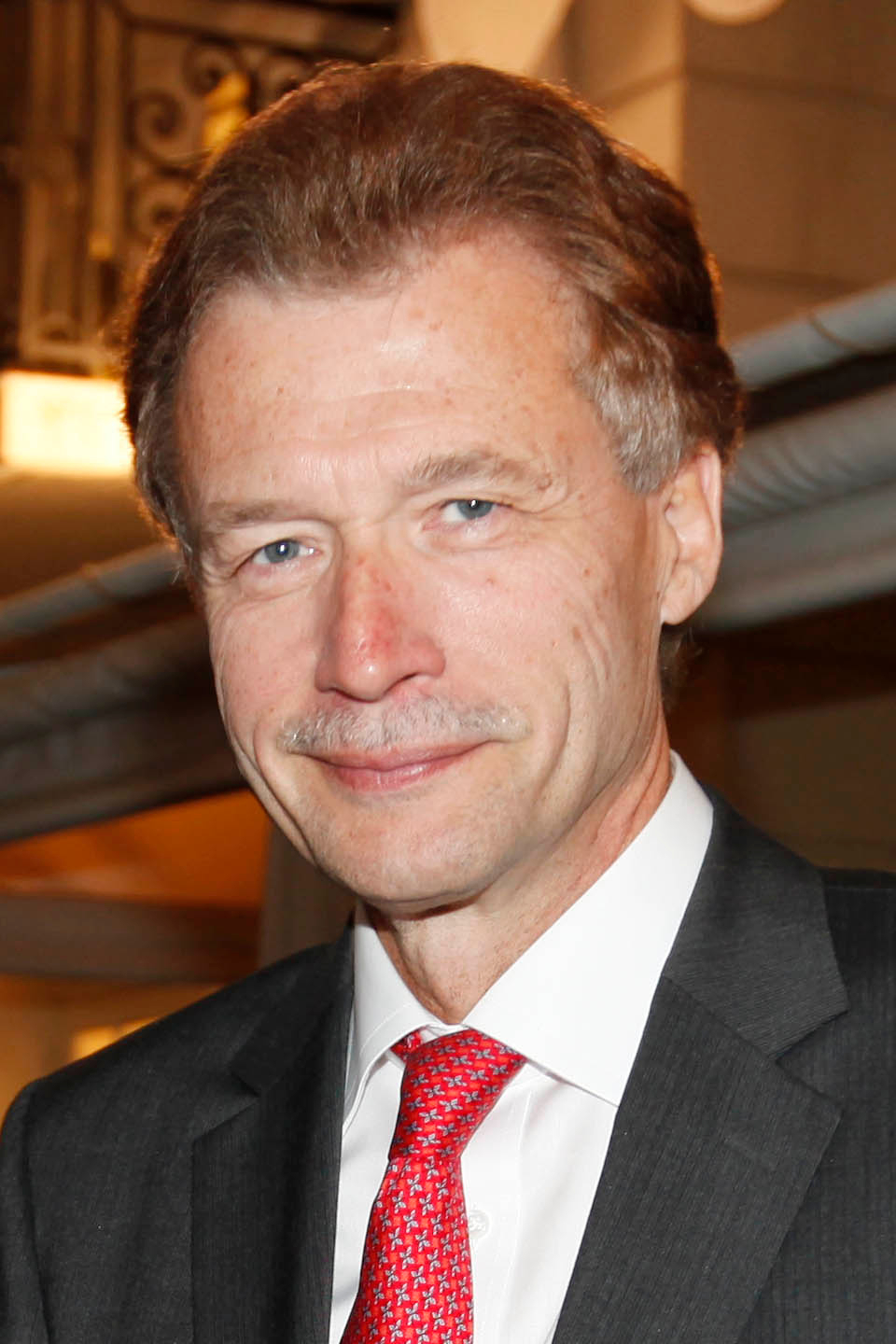
- Peter Ammon (2010)

German Ambassador to the Court of St. James's
- In office May 2014 – January 2018
- President: Frank-Walter Steinmeier
- Preceded by: Georg Boomgaarden
- Succeeded by: Peter Wittig

German Ambassador to the United States
- In office August 2011 – May 2014
- President: Christian Wulff; Joachim Gauck
- Preceded by: Klaus Scharioth
- Succeeded by: Peter Wittig

Personal details
- Born: 23 February 1952 (age 74) Frankfurt, West Germany (now Germany)
- Spouse: Marliese Heimann-Ammon
- Children: 2
- Education: Free University of Berlin

Peter Ammon (born in Frankfurt/Main on 23 February 1952) is a German diplomat and was Ambassador of the Federal Republic of Germany to the United Kingdom from May 2014 until 31 January 2018.

== Education and career ==
Ammon studied Mathematics and holds a doctorate in economics from Berlin's Free University. He most recently served as German Ambassador to the United States (2011–2014) and as State Secretary (British equivalent title: Permanent Secr.) at the German Foreign Office in Berlin (2008–2011).

In 2007 and 2008, Ammon was appointed German Ambassador to Paris, France. His prior diplomatic career included postings to London, Dakar/Senegal, New Delhi, and Washington, D.C.

From 1996 to 1999, he was Head of Policy Planning and speech writer to the President of Germany, Roman Herzog.

A staunch advocate of free trade, Ammon takes strong interest in what it takes to build a rules-based, peaceful and prosperous global order. As Director General for Economics at the German Foreign Office from 2001 to 2007, he worked with German "Mittelstand" companies embracing globalisation, and helped to prepare the G8 world economic summits for German chancellors Gerhard Schröder and Angela Merkel. In London, Ammon's agenda is focused on minimising economic and political risk after the Brexit referendum.

== Personal life ==
Ammon is married to Marliese Heimann-Ammon. They have two grown daughters, Ariane and Christina. His personal interests include music, science and hiking. Honours: Freeman of the City of London; hon. Dr. of the University of Alabama in Huntsville, Cross of the Order of Merit of the Federal Republic of Germany; Officer of the Legion of Honour (France); Grand Cross of the Order of Merit (Portugal); Commander of the Order of Bernardo O'Higgins (Chile).
