= Miguel Berger =

German diplomat (born 1961)

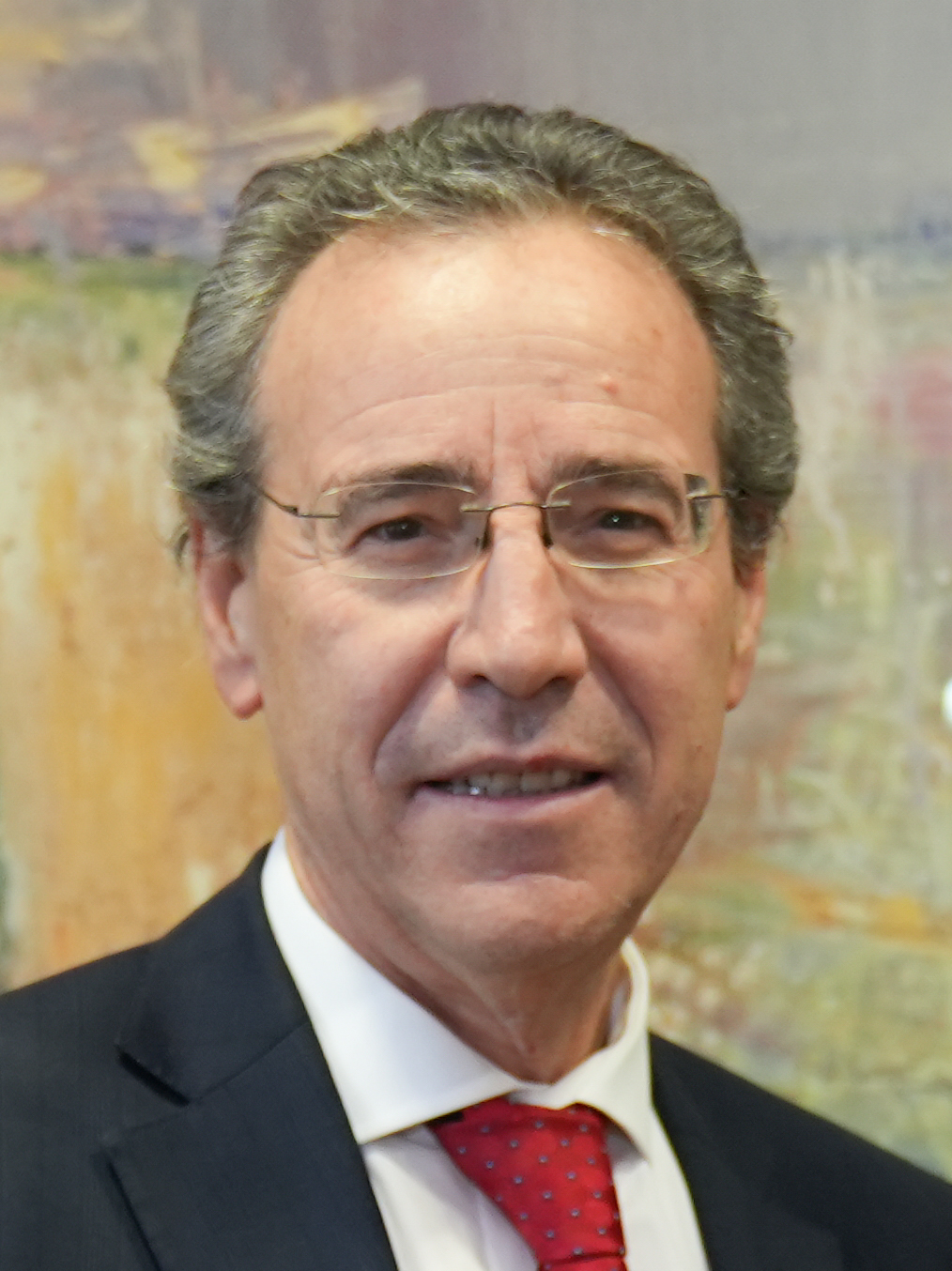
- Berger in 2024

German Ambassador to Poland
- Incumbent
- Assumed office August 2025
- President: Frank-Walter Steinmeier
- Preceded by: Viktor Elbling

German Ambassador to the Court of St. James's
- In office May 2022 – August 2025
- President: Frank-Walter Steinmeier
- Preceded by: Andreas Michaelis
- Succeeded by: Susanne Baumann

Personal details
- Born: 14 January 1961 (age 65) Madrid, Spain
- Education: University of Mannheim

Miguel Berger (born 14 January 1961 in Madrid, Spain) is a German diplomat who has served as the German Ambassador to Poland since August 2025. He served as the German Ambassador to the United Kingdom from May 2022 to August 2025. He was State Secretary at the Federal Foreign Office from 2020 to 2021.

== Biography ==
Berger studied economics at the University of Mannheim and joined the German diplomatic service in 1988. After his training, he worked from 1990 to 1993 as a consultant for the German minority in Romania at the German Embassy in Bucharest. From 1993 to 1997, he was a press and political officer at the German Embassy in Mexico City. He then moved to the headquarters of the Federal Foreign Office. From 1997 to 1999, he worked there as a consultant in the Parliamentary and Cabinet Division in Bonn, before becoming deputy director of the same division in Berlin at the Haus am Werderschen Markt from 1999 to 2002. From there, he moved to New York, where he was deputy director of the Economic Department at the Permanent Mission of Germany to the United Nations until 2004. Berger then became Head of the German Representation Office in the Palestinian Territories before moving back to the Parliamentary and Cabinet Division in 2006, this time as Director. From June 2010 to July 2013, he was deputy director at the Permanent Mission to the United Nations in New York and served as Chairman of the Budget and Administration Committee of the 67th United Nations General Assembly from September 2012 to September 2013. During this period, Germany was a non-permanent member of the UN Security Council for two years.

In August 2013, Berger became Commissioner for Global Issues and Foreign Energy and Climate Policy in Berlin, but changed departments in July 2014 and became Regional Commissioner for the Middle East and Maghreb. Finally, in July 2016, he became Director of the Department for Economic Affairs and Sustainable Development, where he was responsible for Instex, among other things.

He was appointed State Secretary at the Federal Foreign Office on 4 May 2020. His predecessor Andreas Michaelis moved to London as ambassador. As State Secretary, Berger was responsible for the two political departments as well as the coordination of German foreign policy in Europe and the Asia-Pacific region and the Crisis Commissioner. He was criticized for his handling of the evacuation of the German embassy in Kabul after the Fall of Kabul to the Taliban.

Shortly after taking office as Federal Minister for Foreign Affairs, Annalena Baerbock decided in December 2021 to dismiss Berger and reinstate his predecessor Andreas Michaelis, former German ambassador to London, as State Secretary. Berger in turn became ambassador to the United Kingdom and was received by Queen Elizabeth II on 7 July 2022, to present his credentials. His term as ambassador to the UK ended in August 2025.

Berger has served as the German Ambassador to Poland since August 2025.

Miguel Berger is married and has one daughter.

== Politics ==
He was described by Der Spiegel as "close to the SPD (Social Democrats)" and as a "Middle East expert".
