= Susanne Baumann =

German diplomat (born 1961)

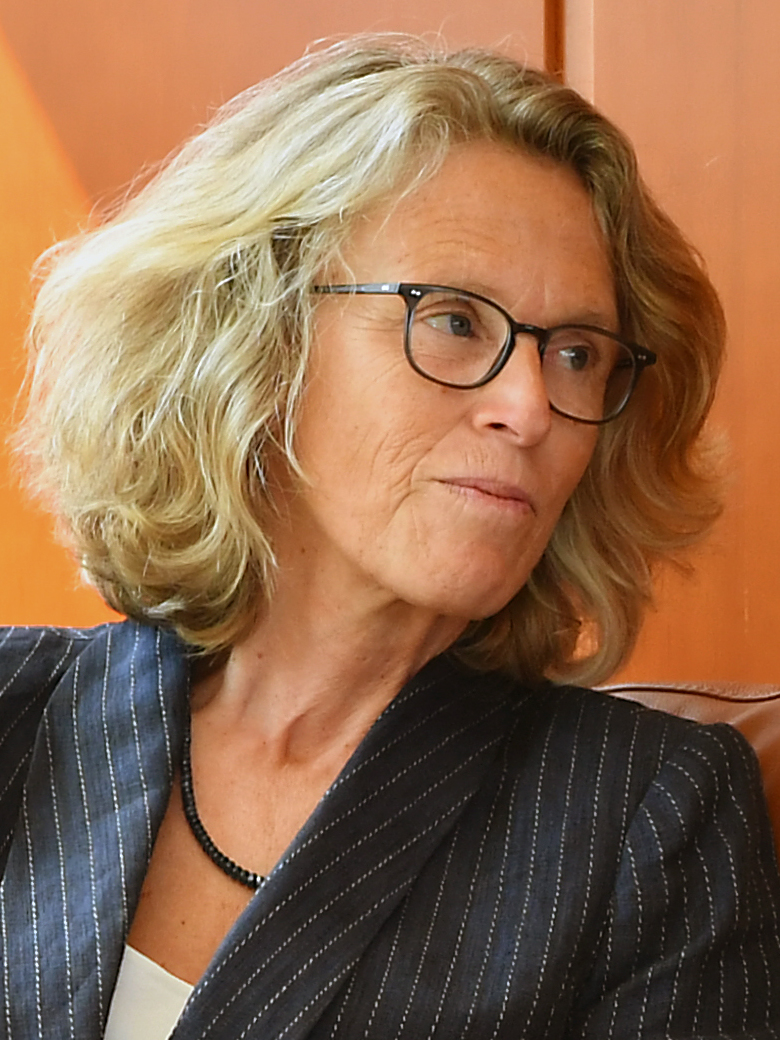
- Baumann in 2020

German Ambassador to the Court of St. James's
- Incumbent
- Assumed office September 2025
- President: Frank-Walter Steinmeier
- Preceded by: Miguel Berger

Federal Government Commissioner for Disarmament and Arms Control
- In office July 2018 – December 2021
- President: Frank-Walter Steinmeier
- Preceded by: Patricia Flor
- Succeeded by: Günter Sautter

Personal details
- Born: 16 March 1965 (age 61) Singen am Hohentwiel, Baden-Württemberg, Germany
- Education: University of Bonn

Susanne Baumann (born 16 March 1965 in Singen am Hohentwiel, Germany) is a German diplomat who has served as German Ambassador to the United Kingdom since September 2025. She served as the Federal Government Commissioner for Disarmament and Arms Control from 2018 to 2021 and as a State Secretary at the Federal Foreign Office from 2021 to 2025.

== Biography ==
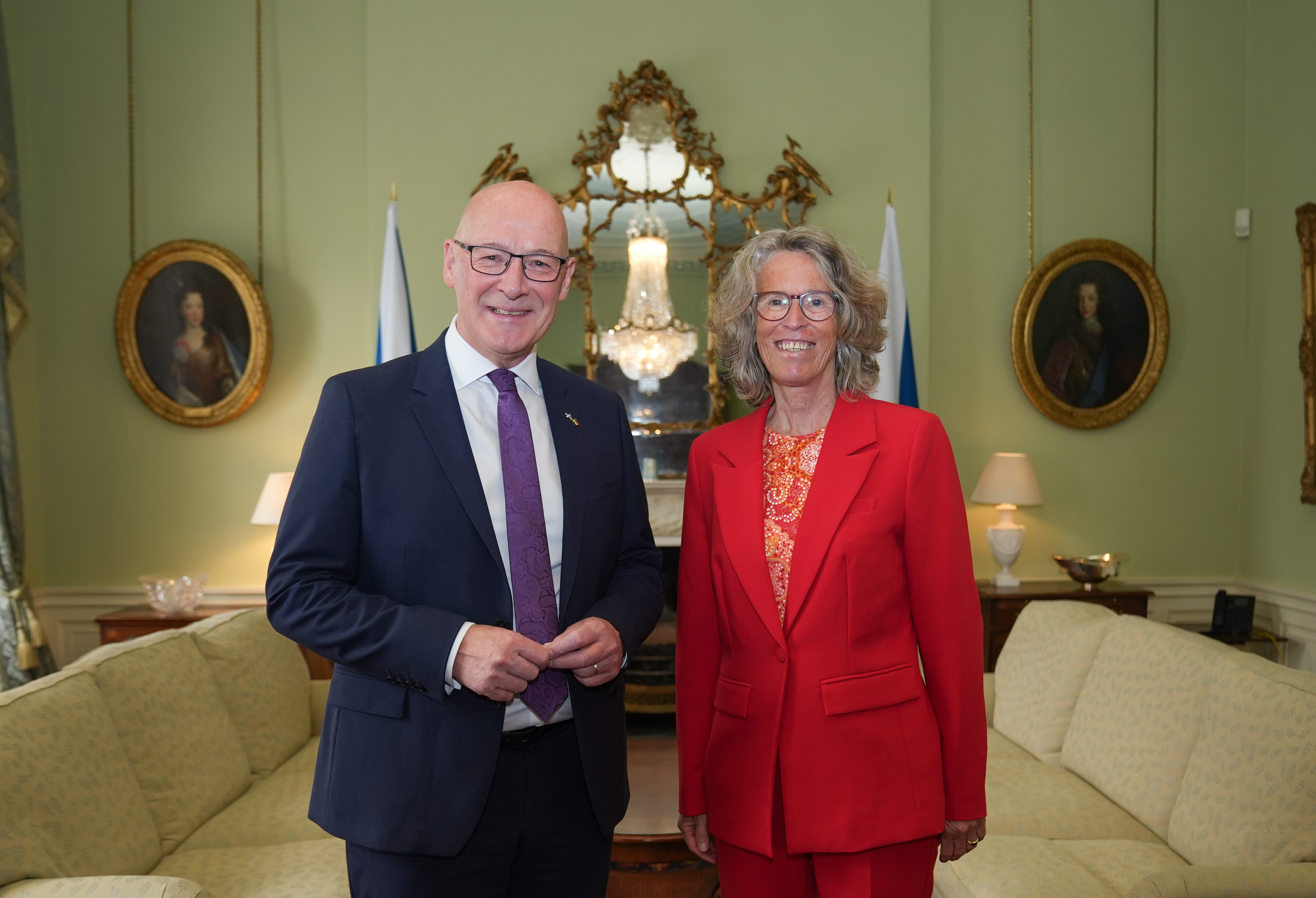
Baumann with Scottish First Minister John Swinney in June 2026

From 1984 to 1987, Baumann trained for the higher intermediate service in the Foreign Office, graduating with a degree in public administration. She subsequently held postings in Bonn, Paris, Miami, Dakar, and Tbilisi, while also studying law part-time. From 1990 to 1992, she studied law at the University of Bonn.

In 1993, Baumann joined the higher foreign service. From 1994 to 1995, she worked in the task force “Future Prospects for the Foreign Service” at the Foreign Office. She then served as Deputy Head of Mission at the German Embassy in Phnom Penh, Cambodia from 1995 to 1998. From 1998 to 2002, she worked in the Public Relations division of the Foreign Office and, between 1999 and 2002, also headed the German government's representative office in Prizren, Kosovo. From 2002 to 2006, she was posted to the German Embassy in Kuala Lumpur, Malaysia. She later worked in the Parliament and Cabinet Division of the Foreign Office (2006–2010) and, from 2010 to 2011, served as political advisor to the head of the Operations Command Staff at the Federal Ministry of Defence.

In 2011, she became Head of the Division for Nuclear Disarmament, Arms Control and Non-proliferation at the Federal Foreign Office. Two years later, she moved to the Federal Chancellery, where she headed the division responsible for security and arms control policy, bilateral relations with the United States and Canada, as well as relations with Northern, Western, and Southern Europe and Turkey.

In 2018, Baumann returned to the Federal Foreign Office as Deputy Commissioner for Disarmament and Arms Control. From July 2018 to December 2021, she served as the Commissioner for Disarmament and Arms Control, with the rank of ambassador, and as Director-General for International Order, the United Nations, and Arms Control at the Federal Foreign Office. In this role, she was also an advisory member of the Federal Security Council.

On 8 December 2021, Baumann was appointed State Secretary of the Federal Foreign Office. She left this position on 6 May 2025 following the formation of the Merz cabinet.

Since September 2025, she has served as the German Ambassador to the United Kingdom.

== Personal life ==
Baumann is married with one child.
