= Spiridion Lusi =

Greek scholar and Prussian diplomat

Spiridon Lusi
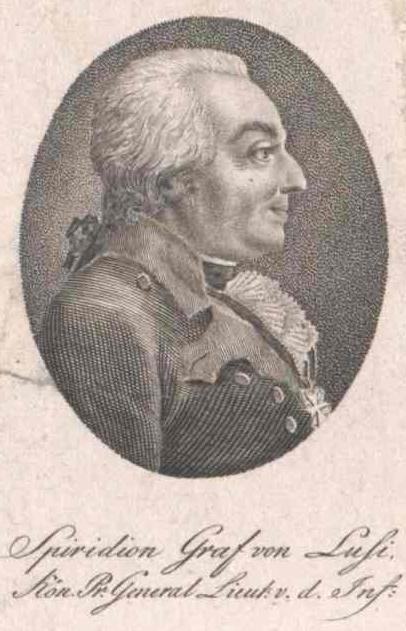
- A portrait of Spiridion Lusi.
- Born: Spyridon Louzis; 1741; Cephalonia, Republic of Venice
- Died: 1815 (aged 73–74); Potsdam
- Occupations: scholar, politician, Prussian ambassador

Spiridion Lusi (Greek: Σπυρίδων Λούζης, Spyridon Louzis, Italian: Spiridione Lusi, German: Spiridion Graf von Lusi; c. 1741 – c. 1815) was a Greek scholar, diplomat, politician and naturalized ambassador of Prussia.

== Biography ==
Spiridion Lusi was of Greek origin. He was born on the island of Cephalonia in 1741, at that time a possession of the Republic of Venice. He migrated to Italy where he resided for many years and was educated in the Greek College at Venice, and later at the University of Padua. He was eventually sent as Venice's minister to London, and in Prussia and Berlin. From 1763 to 1765, he translated the four volumes of a translation of Lucian from the Greek language into Italian, in four volumes published in London and Venice in 1764. Lusi added some dialogue translated by Gasparo Gozzi. Several years later he moved to Vienna.

In 1775, whilst Lusi was in Breslau, he made the acquaintance of Frederick the Great. He came to Berlin in 1777, where he was introduced into society and presented to the king at Potsdam. During the War of the Bavarian Succession, he joined the volunteer corps as a Captain, fought with distinction against the Austrians and was soon promoted to Major. In 1780 he was hired as Prussian ambassador to London, a position he assumed in February 1781. With the improvement of Prussia's relations with England, which occurred in the last years of Frederick's reign, Lusi managed to exert a more fruitful ambassadorial activity. In 1784 he was appointed Colonel. He was recalled in October 1788 from London, and in 1790 he accompanied the new king, Frederick William II, who contracted an army against Austria. In January 1792 he had a son, Friedrich Wilhelm Ludwig August Spiridion (Φρειδερίκος Λούζης), who would eventually become captain in the Guards Regiment. In 1792 he was appointed Major General by King Frederick William III, and Lieutenant General in 1798. In 1800 he was appointed ambassador at St. Petersburg, but he was dismissed two years later at his own request. Thereafter he lived quietly and withdrawn in Potsdam, where he died in 1815.

His descendants settled both in Germany and in Ireland. The name died out in Ireland in 1919 with the death of his granddaughter Countess Elise de Lusi, but his other Irish descendants include the physicist Professor John Joly FRS (1857–1933). There are still living descendants in Germany.
