= Albrecht von Bernstorff (born 1809) =

German diplomat (1809–1873)

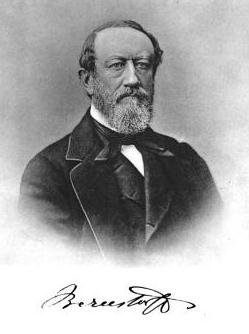

German Ambassador to Britain
- In office 1867–1873
- Monarch: William I
- Preceded by: Himself as Prussian Envoy to England
- Succeeded by: Georg Herbert Münster

Foreign Minister of Prussia
- In office 12 October 1861 – 8 October 1862
- Monarch: William I
- Prime Minister: Charles Anthony, Prince of Hohenzollern
- Preceded by: Alexander von Schleinitz
- Succeeded by: Otto von Bismarck

Prussian Envoy to England
- In office 1862–1873
- Preceded by: Vacant
- Succeeded by: Himself as Ambassador of the North German Confederation
- In office 1854–1861
- Monarch: Frederick William IV
- Preceded by: Vacant
- Succeeded by: Christian Charles Josias Bunsen

Personal details
- Born: 22 March 1809 Dreilützow, Duchy of Mecklenburg-Schwerin
- Died: 26 March 1873 (aged 64)
- Spouse: Anna von Könneritz (after 1839)
- Children: Johann-Heinrich, Count von Bernstorff
- Education: University of Göttingen

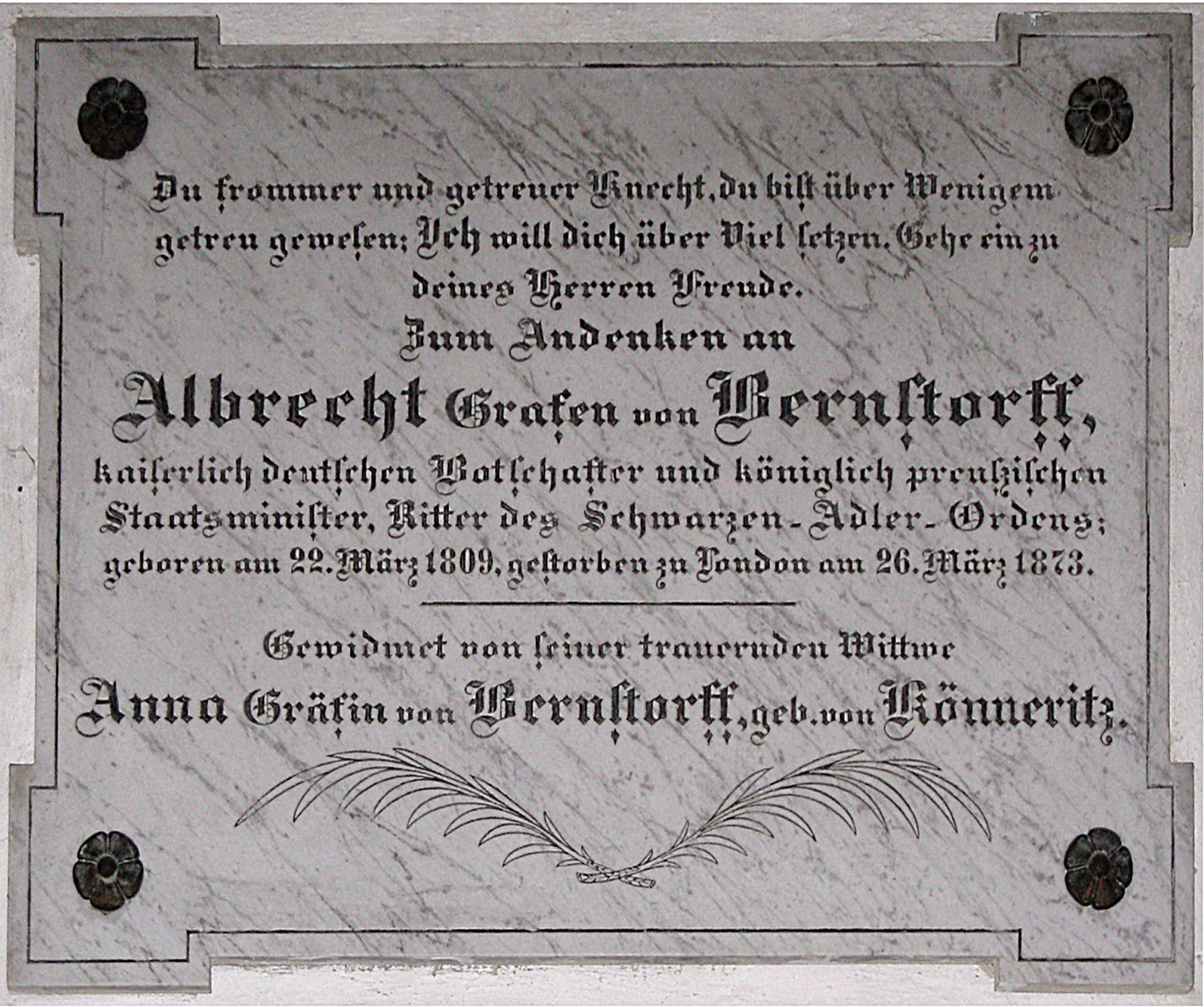
Memorial for Albrecht von Bernstorff in the St. Abundus church in Lassahn

Albrecht Graf von Bernstorff (22 March 1809 – 26 March 1873) was a Prussian statesman.

== Early life ==
Bernstorff was born at the estate Dreilützow (now in the municipality of Wittendörp), in the Duchy of Mecklenburg-Schwerin. He was a son of Friedrich Graf von Bernstorff and Freiin Ferdinandine von Hammerstein Equord.

He studied legal science in Göttingen and Berlin, following which he joined the Prussian civil service.

== Career ==
In 1832 he became an attaché with the Prussian legation in Hamburg. A year later he was made legation secretary in Den Haag. In 1837, he was transferred to St. Petersburg and made legation councillor. Due to the death of his father he returned to Germany that same year to settle family matters. After this, in 1838 he changed to Paris. In 1840 Bernstorff became chargé d'affaires in Naples, and in 1841 in Paris.

Subsequently, from 1842 he was an Expert Councillor (Vortragender Rat) in the political section of the foreign ministry. As such, he occasionally had to represent the foreign minister. In 1843 he was promoted (to Geheimer Legationsrat). In 1845, he went to Munich as Envoy Extraordinary and Minister Plenipotentiary.

Following many travels as a career diplomat, Bernstorff was sent to Vienna as an envoy in May 1848 during the revolution, remaining there until 1851. He soon distinguished himself as an opponent of German unification schemes. (He later came to accept such unification, though he felt it should be under Prussian rather than Austrian leadership.) During the revolution of 1848-1849, he argued for a strong alliance between Prussia and Austria. However, differences between the two states came more to the fore under Austrian prime minister Prince Felix zu Schwarzenberg, and Bernstorff's opposition to the Prince's German policy brought about his recall from his post at the express wishes of the Austrian side in 1851.

In 1851 and 1852, Bernstorff was a member of the first chamber of the Prussian Parliament (Landtag), the Prussian House of Lords, in the Alvensleben faction. With the title of wirklicher geheimer Rat, he was sent to Naples in 1852 as an envoy.

Shortly before the outbreak of the Crimean War in 1854, he was sent as head of the Prussian embassy in London, and was successful in promoting good Anglo-Prussian relations.

=== Prussian foreign minister ===
In October 1861, Bernstorff left London to become the Prussian Foreign Minister under the Prime Minister Charles Anthony, Prince of Hohenzollern. (He had previously been offered the position of Foreign Minister in 1848 and 1850 by King Frederick William IV without taking it up.) He thus replaced a rather passive Count Alexander von Schleinitz (an Old Liberal) and, in the Cabinet, reinforced the more conservative grouping around August von der Heydt and Albrecht von Roon.

He would introduce several new policies and strategies. During this period, ideas were being discussed for the reform of the German Confederation. Bernstorff revived a project from 1849 to form a narrow Prusso-German Bundestaat in order to ward off such initiatives by Austria, and argued for a "Lesser German" union under Prussian leadership and excluding Austria; these plans were not pursued for the time being, however, as they were undermined by mistrust of political elements.

Bernstorff also negotiated military conventions with various northern German states, concluded a free-trade agreement with France as part of changes to the Zollverein policy to isolate protectionist Austria, and swiftly recognized the new Kingdom of Italy as a state in hopes that it would help collaborate against Austria. This last move meant a clear rejection of a Zollunion with Austria.

At the beginning of the Prussian constitutional crisis of 1859-1866, Wilhelm I and his government faced the choice of continuing to govern without a constitutional budget. Von der Heydt, Bernstorff and the minister for trade, Heinrich Wilhelm von Holtzbrinck, rejected this as a violation of the constitution, and resigned. Other ministers, however, were prepared to continue in office. In this situation, the minister for war, von Roon, pushed through the appointment of Otto von Bismarck both as foreign minister and prime minister. Thus, in 1862 Bernstorff was replaced in his post; he would thereafter criticise Bismarck as having Machiavellian policies.

=== Later career ===
He was later reassigned to his position as Prussian ambassador in London, and, after 1871, as German Imperial ambassador with the rank of minister of state, which he remained until his death in 1873. During this time, he also served as the Prussian delegate at the London Peace Conference of 1864, which led to the signing of the Treaty of Vienna. In 1867, he was also the ambassador of the North German Confederation at the negotiations for the Treaty of London, which determined the status of Luxembourg.

== Personal life ==
In 1839, while in Paris, he married Anna von Könneritz (born 23 May 1821 in Dresden), the daughter of the Saxonian ambassador at the French court, Hans Heinrich von Könneritz (1790–1863). Together, they were the parents of:

- Andreas Albrecht von Bernstorff (1844–1907), who married Augusta von Hottinger, a daughter of Heinrich von Hottinger.
- Marie Therese von Bernstorff (b. 1848)
- Friedrich Wilhelm von Bernstorff (b. 1853), who married Augusta Marie Gutschmid (1853–1889)
- Victoria Anna von Bernstorff (b. 1857)
- Albrecht Percy von Bernstorff (b. 1858)
- Johann-Heinrich, Count von Bernstorff (1862–1939), who served as the German Ambassador to the United States until the outbreak of World War I.

Albrecht von Bernstorff died on 26 March 1873. He is buried (according to the inscription on his tombstone) in the Bernstorff family mausoleum in the churchyard at Lassahn, Mecklenburg-Vorpommern.

== Orders and decorations ==
- Kingdom of Prussia:
  - Knight of the Order of the Black Eagle, with Collar
  - Grand Commander's Cross of the Royal House Order of Hohenzollern
- (Saxe-Coburg and Gotha) (Duchy of Saxe-Altenburg) (Saxe-Meiningen) Ernestine duchies: Grand Cross of the Saxe-Ernestine House Order
- Nassau: Knight of the Order of the Gold Lion of the House of Nassau
- Kingdom of Bavaria: Grand Cross of the Order of Merit of the Bavarian Crown
- Persian Empire: Order of the Lion and the Sun, 1st Class
- Kingdom of Portugal: Grand Cross of the Royal Military Order of Our Lord Jesus Christ
- Two Sicilies: Knight of the Order of Saint Januarius
