= Ezekiel, Freiherr von Spanheim =

Swiss diplomat

Ezekiel, Freiherr von Spanheim (also Ézéchiel, and known as Baron Spanheim) (7/18 December 1629 – 14/25 November 1710) was a diplomat and scholar from the Republic of Geneva.

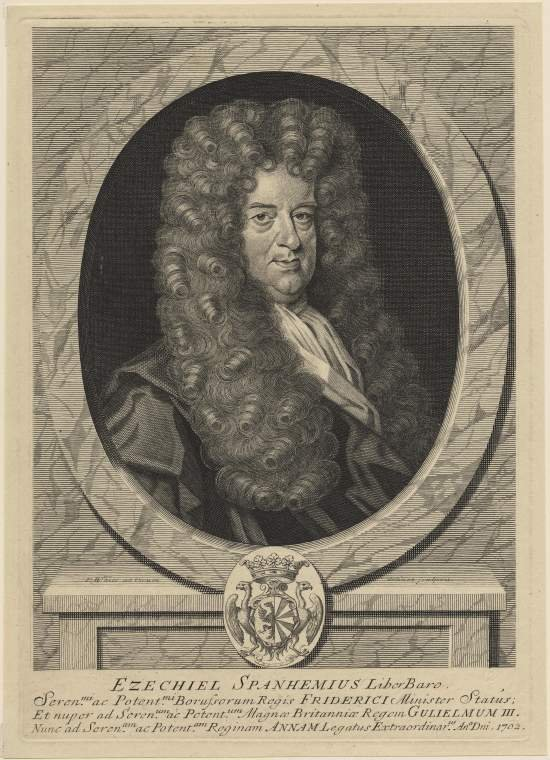
Ezechiel Spanheim, 1702 engraving by Robert White.

== Life ==
He was born at Geneva, the eldest son of Friedrich Spanheim the Elder. After 1642 he studied philology and theology at the University of Leyden, and in 1650 returned to Geneva to be Professor of Rhetoric at Geneva.

In 1656 Spanheim became tutor to the son of Charles I Louis, Elector Palatine. Political theory led him into a diplomatic career. The Elector sent him in 1661 to Rome to investigate intrigues of the Roman Catholic Electors. After his return in 1665 the Elector employed him as ambassador at various courts, finally in England where after 1679 he was charged also with the affairs of the Elector of Brandenburg. He was elected a Fellow of the Royal Society in 1679.

In 1680 he entered the service of electoral Brandenburg as minister of state. As ambassador of the Great Elector he spent nine years at the court of Paris, and subsequently devoted some years to studies in Berlin; but after the Peace of Ryswick in 1697 he returned as ambassador to France where he remained until 1702.

In 1702, he went on his final diplomatic mission, as the first Prussian ambassador to England, where he served until his death in 1710. In the wake of Frederick I's assumption of the royal title he was the first royal ambassador dispatched and received in London, ceremonial honours befitting this status. He regularly took part in ceremonial processions and public thanksgivings in London. In 1706 he was granted a departure gift of £1000 from Queen Anne, though he was quickly reinstated. After his death, his daughter received an additional departure gift of £1000. He died in London in 1710 and was buried in Westminster Abbey.

== Works ==
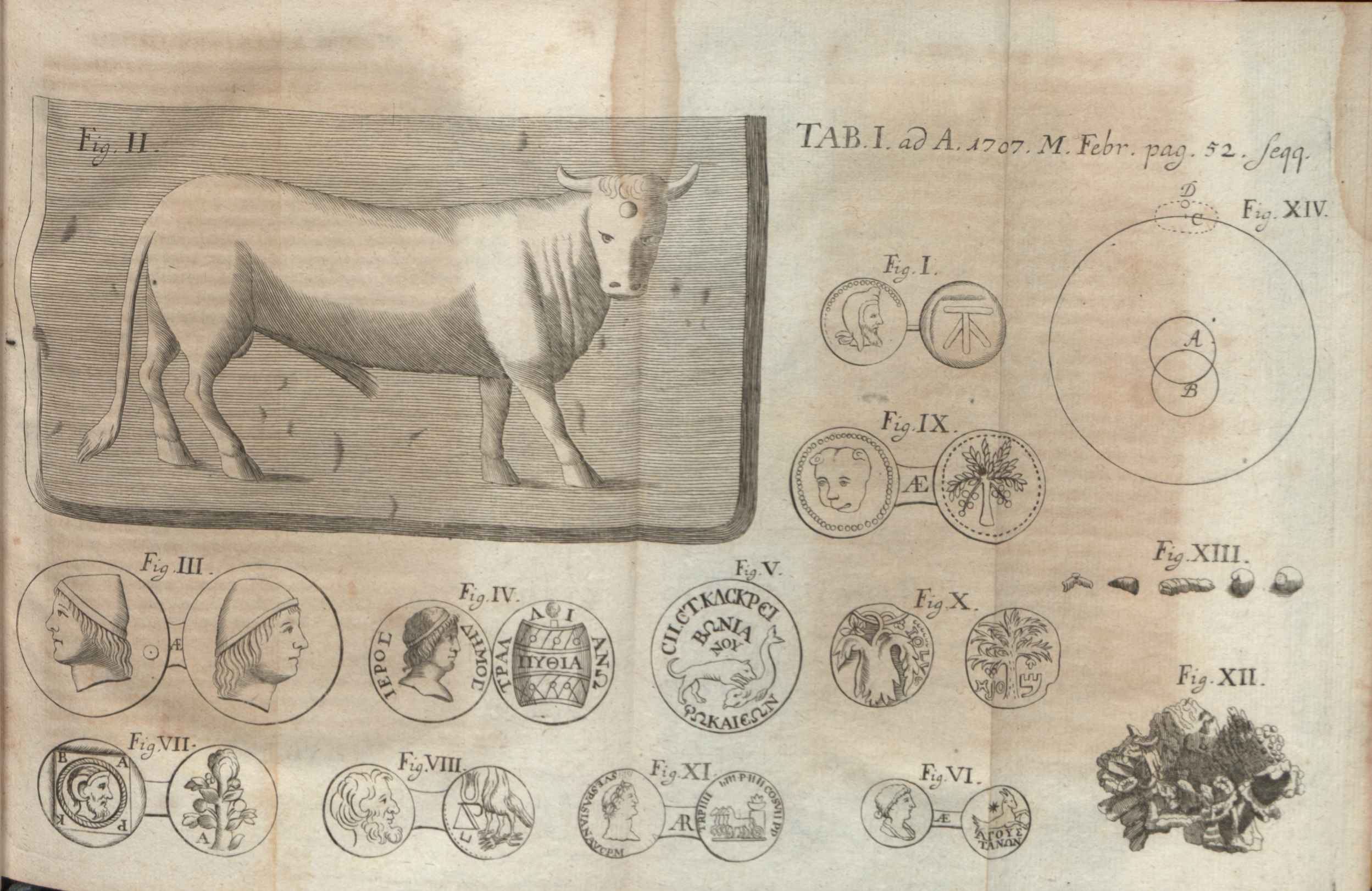
Fig. 1. Illustration of critique of Dissertationes de praestantia... published in Acta Eruditorum, 1707

His major works are Disputationes de usu et præstantia numismatum antiquorum (Rome, 1664; in 2 vols., London and Amsterdam, 1706–17) and Orbis Romanus (London, 1704; Halle, 1738), which Edward Gibbon used as a source for his monumental The Decline and Fall of the Roman Empire. He also edited with Petavius the Opera of Cyril of Alexandria and of the Emperor Julian (Leipzig, 1696).

== Notes ==
Attribution
