= Hansjörg Haber =

German diplomat

Hansjörg Haber (born 21 February 1953) is a former German diplomat.

== Biography ==
=== Studies and family ===
After graduating from Atlantic College in Wales, he studied economics at LMU Munich, where he also worked as a research assistant before joining the German Foreign Service. He held diplomatic roles in Paris, Bern, Moscow, Manila, and Ankara, Beirut, Cairo, Prague, Sana'a, in the German Federal Foreign Office in Bonn and Berlin, and various roles for the European Union.

He is married to the diplomat Emily Haber, with whom he has two children.

=== Diplomatic career ===
He works as a diplomat in Paris, Bern, Moscow, Manilla and Ankara. He served from 2002 to 2006 as Head of the Unit for Fundamental Issues of the United Nations at the Federal Foreign Office, where he was responsible for the strategic planning and development of Germany's position on UN peacekeeping missions and the UN's role in regional conflicts.

He was accredited German Ambassador to Beirut.

From September 16, 2008, to the end of April 2011, Hansjörg Haber headed the EU observer mission in Georgia. During this time, Hansjörg Haber was monitored by Germany's own intelligence services, independently by the BND (Federal Intelligence Service) and without the authorization of the G-10 Commission, a fact that was revealed in the BND affair of 2015.

On March 28, 2011, Haber was appointed by the EU High Representative for Foreign Affairs and Security Policy, Catherine Ashton, as Head of the Civil Planning and Conduct Capability (CPCC) at the European External Action Service.

From 2014 to 2015, Haber served as German Ambassador to Egypt in Cairo. He then succeeded Stefano Manservisi as Head of the Delegation of the European Union, colloquially known as the EU Ambassador, to Turkey.[8] He resigned from this post on June 14, 2016.

He served as Ambassador of the Federal Republic of Germany to Yemen from 2017 to October 2018.
