= Embassy of Germany, London =

German diplomatic mission in the United Kingdom

Embassy of Germany in London
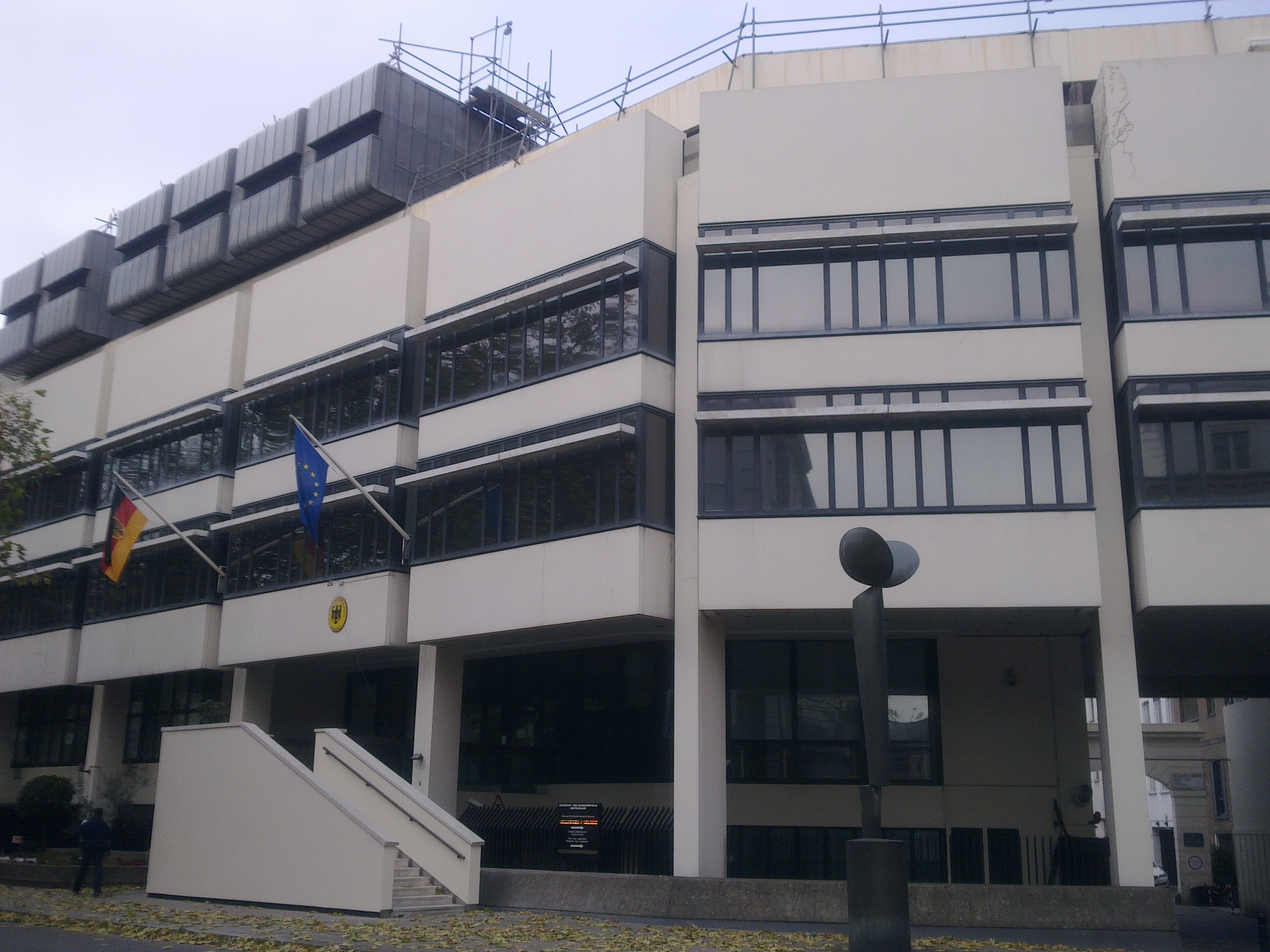
- Location: Belgravia, London
- Address: 23 Belgrave Square/Chesham Place, London, SW1X 8PZ
- Coordinates: 51.49825°N 0.15425°W
- Ambassador: Susanne Baumann

The Embassy of Germany in London is the diplomatic mission of Germany in the United Kingdom. The embassy is located at Belgrave Square, in Belgravia. It occupies three of the original terraced houses in Belgrave Square and a late 20th-century extension.

== History ==
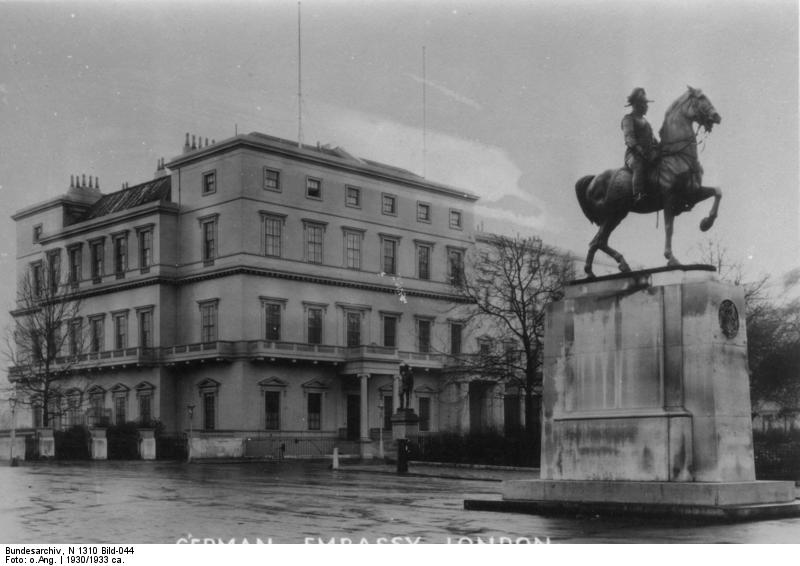
The German Embassy, c. 1930

Prussian Legation Act 1850
- Act of Parliament
- Parliament of the United Kingdom
- Long title: An Act to authorize the Purchase by the Prussian Minister of a Residence in England for the Use of the Prussian Legation, and to regulate the future holding of the same.
- Citation: 13 & 14 Vict. c. 3

Dates
- Royal assent: 15 July 1850

Text of statute as originally enacted

From 1842, Christian Charles Josias von Bunsen leased 4 Carlton House Terrace for the Prussian Legation. In March 1849, the legation moved along the terrace to the larger 9 Carlton House Terrace, which was renamed 'Prussia House'. Its purchase was authorised by the Prussian Legation Act 1850 (13 & 14 Vict. c. 3): this was necessary as before the passing of the Naturalization Act 1870 (33 & 34 Vict. c. 14), only British subjects could legally own property in England.

Count Bernstorff replaced Baron von Bunsen in 1855, becoming the German Ambassador from 1867.

During the First World War, the building was occupied by the American Embassy (as protecting power) between 1916 and 1917, and then the Swiss Legation from 1918 to 1920. In 1921 the German Embassy resumed occupation.

During Hans Wesemann's 1936 trial over the kidnapping of pacifist writer Berthold Jacob from Basel, Switzerland, Wesemann admitted that the German Embassy in London had been used as a base for the activities of the Gestapo, the Nazi secret State police. In 1937, Ambassador Joachim von Ribbentrop hosted 1,000 people, including Prince George, Duke of Kent and his wife, Marina, Duchess of Kent, at the reopening of the Embassy at Carlton House Terrace which had undergone a £100,000 renovation. In September 1939, the German Embassy burned its files following the onset of World War II.

=== Post World War II ===
Throughout the war, the closed embassy remained intact under diplomatic conventions. But after World War II, with Germany itself occupied and German government properties taken up by the occupiers, Prussia House was requisitioned as enemy property, furniture and the works of art were sold in separate auctions. The British fascist Robert Gordon-Canning attracted public attention when at one of these auctions he purchased a large marble bust of Hitler for £500 (equivalent to £19,000 today).

The Federal Republic of Germany moved its consulate and diplomatic operations to Belgrave Square, still operating as a consulate general. The consulate became a fully functional embassy in June 1951, the FRG leasing the building for 99 years in 1953. In the 1960s, the West German Embassy was the site of Jewish War veterans who were protesting signs in Germany of a revival of anti-Semitism.

In the 1970s, office space in the embassy was tight so an extension was erected at Chesham Place, inaugurated in 1978. It won the Westminster City Council prize for architecture.

In 1990, after German reunification, the East German embassy building at 34 Belgrave Square became part of the German embassy.

== Gallery ==
Coat of Arms of German Foreign Missions

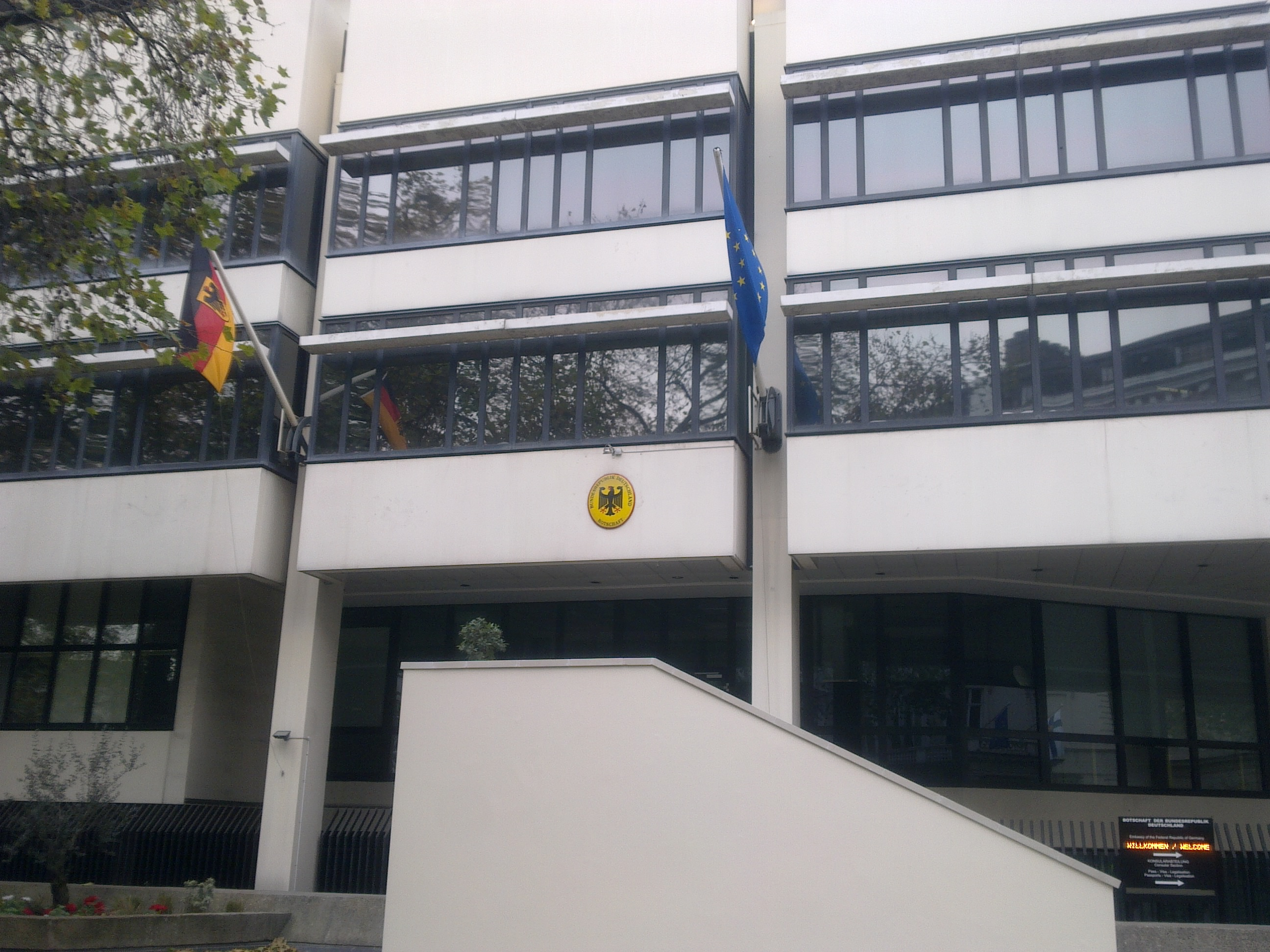
The embassy seen from Chesham Place

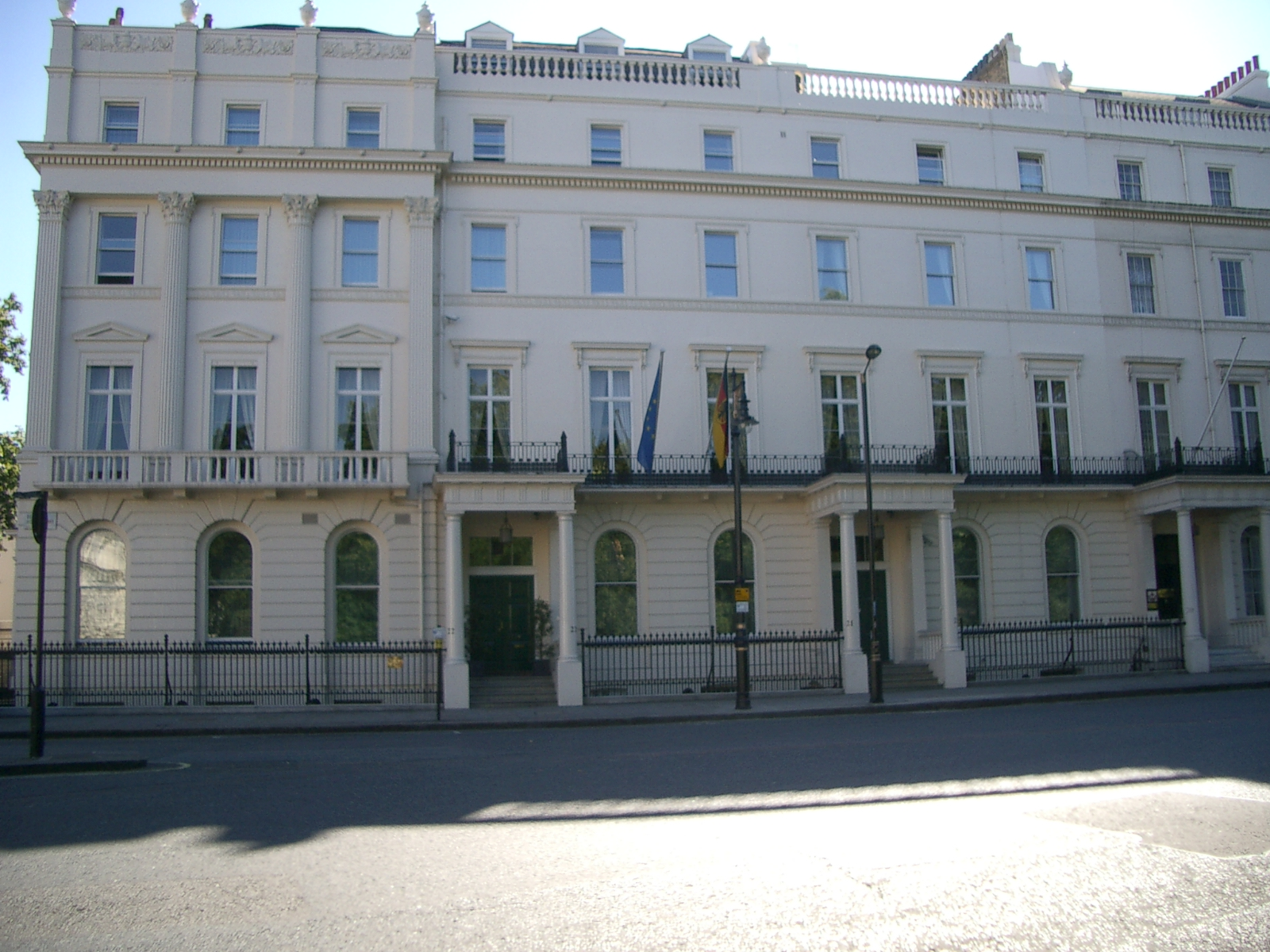
The Residence at Belgrave Square

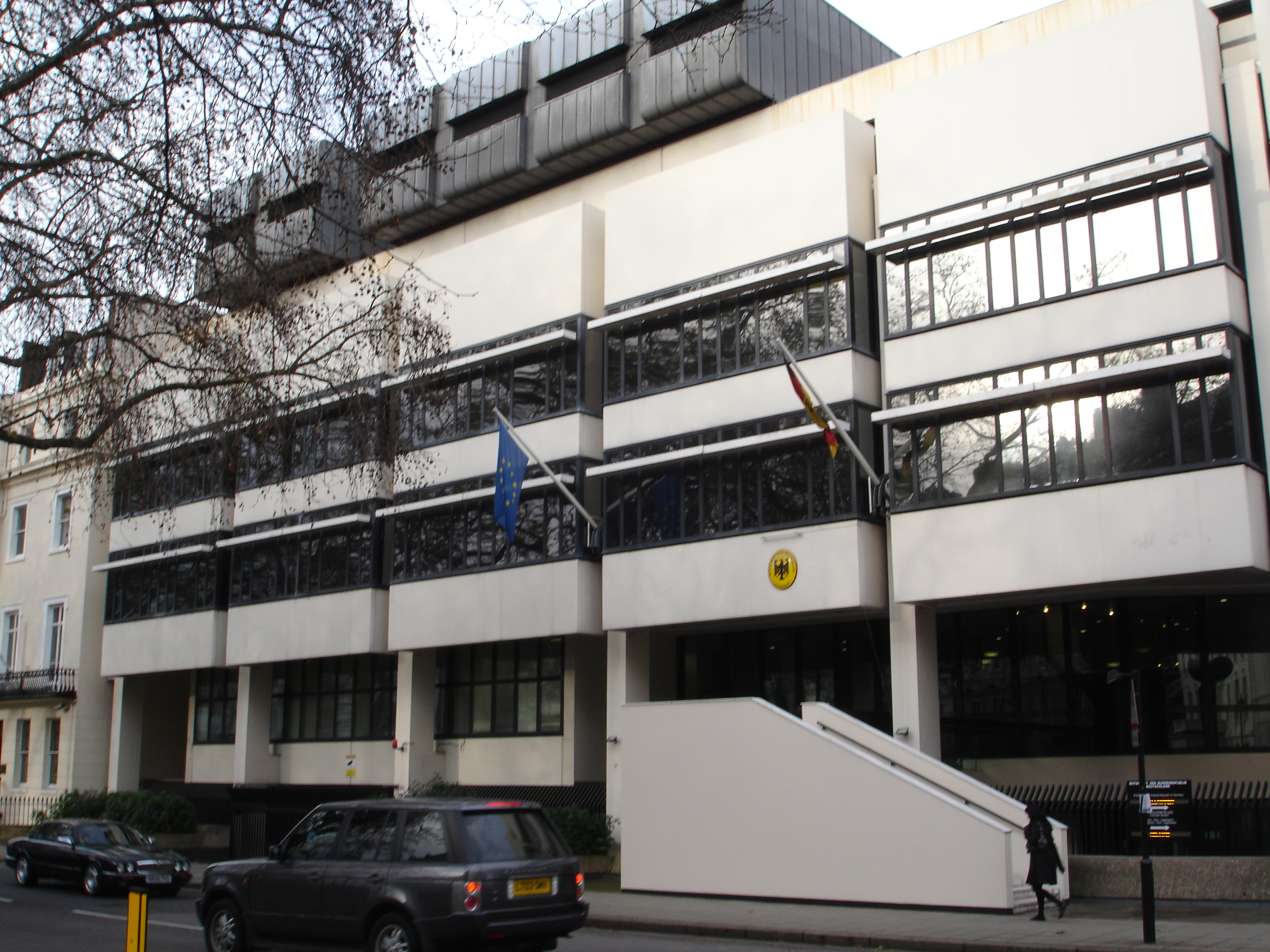
The Chancery around the corner on Chesham Place
