= Adolf Georg von Maltzan =

German politician (1877–1927)

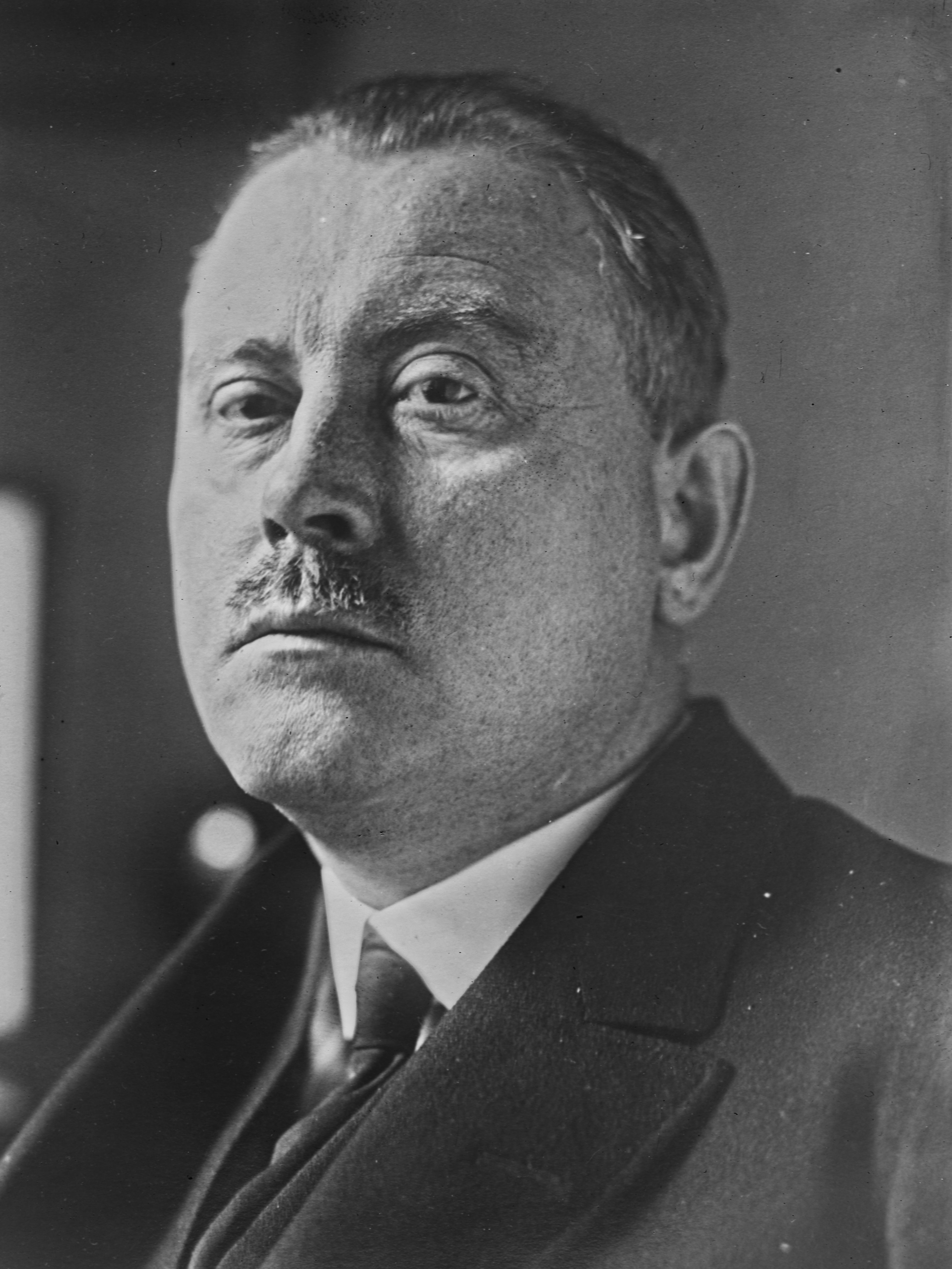
- Von Maltzan in 1924

German Ambassador to the United States
- In office 1925–1927
- Preceded by: Otto Wiedfeldt
- Succeeded by: Friedrich Wilhelm von Prittwitz und Gaffron

Personal details
- Born: Adolf Georg Otto von Maltzan; 31 July 1877; Klein-Varchow, Mecklenburg
- Died: 23 September 1927 (aged 50); Schleiz, Thüringen
- Cause of death: Plane crash
- Spouse: Edith Gruson (m. 1914; died 1927)
- Children: Edith von Maltzan
- Parent(s): Ulrich von Maltzan; Adelheit Bierbaum
- Education: Katharineum
- Alma mater: University of Bonn; University of Wrocław

Adolf Georg Otto "Ago" von Maltzan, Baron zu Wartenberg und Penzlin (31 July 1877 – 23 September 1927) was a German diplomat during the Weimar Republic, serving as State Secretary of the Foreign Office and Ambassador in Washington.

== Early life ==
Baron von Maltzan, nicknamed Ago based on the initials of his baptismal names, was born on 31 July 1877 on his father's estate at Klein-Varchow, Mecklenburg, Germany. He was the eldest son of manor owner Ulrich von Maltzan (1846–1931) and his wife Adelheid (née Bierbaum) von Maltzan (1857–1924). He was part of the nobility of Mecklenburg and Western Pomerania.

He attended the Katharineum in Lübeck, graduating in 1896. He then studied law at the Rheinische Friedrich-Wilhelms University (known as the University of Bonn) and was a member of the Corps Borussia Bonn before transferring to the Silesian Friedrich Wilhelm University in Breslau.

== Career ==
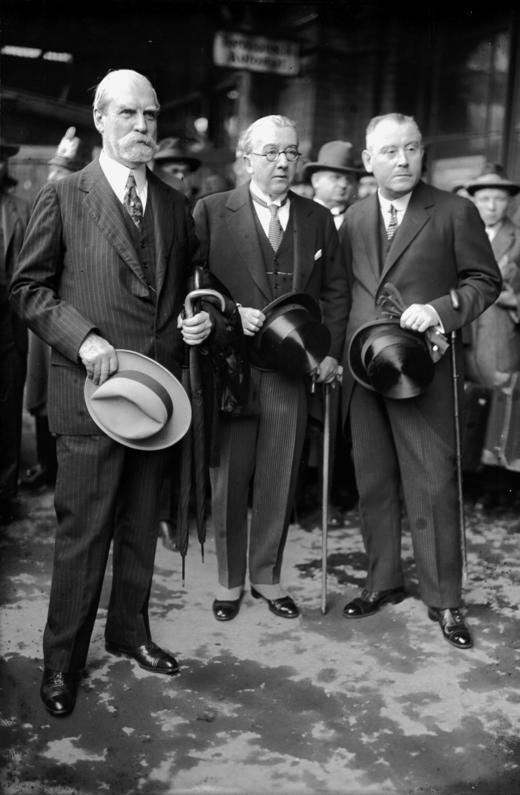
U.S. Secretary of State Charles Evans Hughes, U.S. Ambassador Alanson B. Houghton, and von Maltzan, in Berlin, August 1924

After completing his studies and military service, von Maltzan started his diplomatic service for the German Empire in 1906. He was initially employed as attaché in Rio de Janeiro in 1907, legation secretary in Oslo in 1909, St. Petersburg in 1911. In 1912 he was promoted to legation counselor and was assigned to Peking where he acted as chargé d'affaires during the 1911 Revolution. Between his posts abroad, he took the diplomatic exam in 1908, and held "home posts" in the Foreign Office in Berlin, in the Reich Chancellery and at the Prussian Embassy in Stuttgart.

=== World War I ===
During World War I, von Maltzan served as First Lieutenant in the Mecklenburg Dragoons before he was transferred to diplomatic duty as representative of the Wilhelmstrasse (the Foreign Office) to the Commander-in-Chief Eastern Front in the Spring of 1917. By opposing the militarists, he made himself so unpopular he was transferred to The Hague in December 1917.

According to his obituary in Time, "His greatest diplomatic ordeal was doubtless in persuading the Kaiser to abdicate. Wilhelm II, at the time he fled from Germany, had not officially abdicated, his renunciation of the throne having been announced without Imperial authority by Chancellor Prince Max of Baden. Baron von Maltzan was therefore sent to Amerongen Castle to secure the Kaiser’s formal abdication as German Emperor and King of Prussia."

=== Later career ===
After the War ended, von Maltzan was appointed Reich Commissioner for the East by Minister Hermann Müller in 1919, responsible for the newly formed Baltic countries of Estonia and Latvia, where he organized the withdrawal of the German troops stationed there and the protection of East Prussia. Afterwards, von Maltzan served as Ministerial Director from 1921 and Secretary of State for Foreign Affairs from 1922, becoming head of the Russian Department of the Foreign Office. As such, von Maltzan played a key role in bringing about the Treaty of Rapallo between Germany and Soviet Russia (from the end of 1922 the Soviet Union), which was signed on 16 April 1922.

In 1924, von Maltzan was appointed as the ambassador to the German Embassy in Washington but did not present his credentials to President Calvin Coolidge at the White House until 12 March 1925. In October 1925, von Maltzan and Secretary Frank B. Kellogg exchanged ratifications of a commercial treaty which was the first treaty between the countries following World War I with the exception of the peace treaty. After his death, he was replaced by Friedrich Wilhelm von Prittwitz und Gaffron.

== Personal life ==
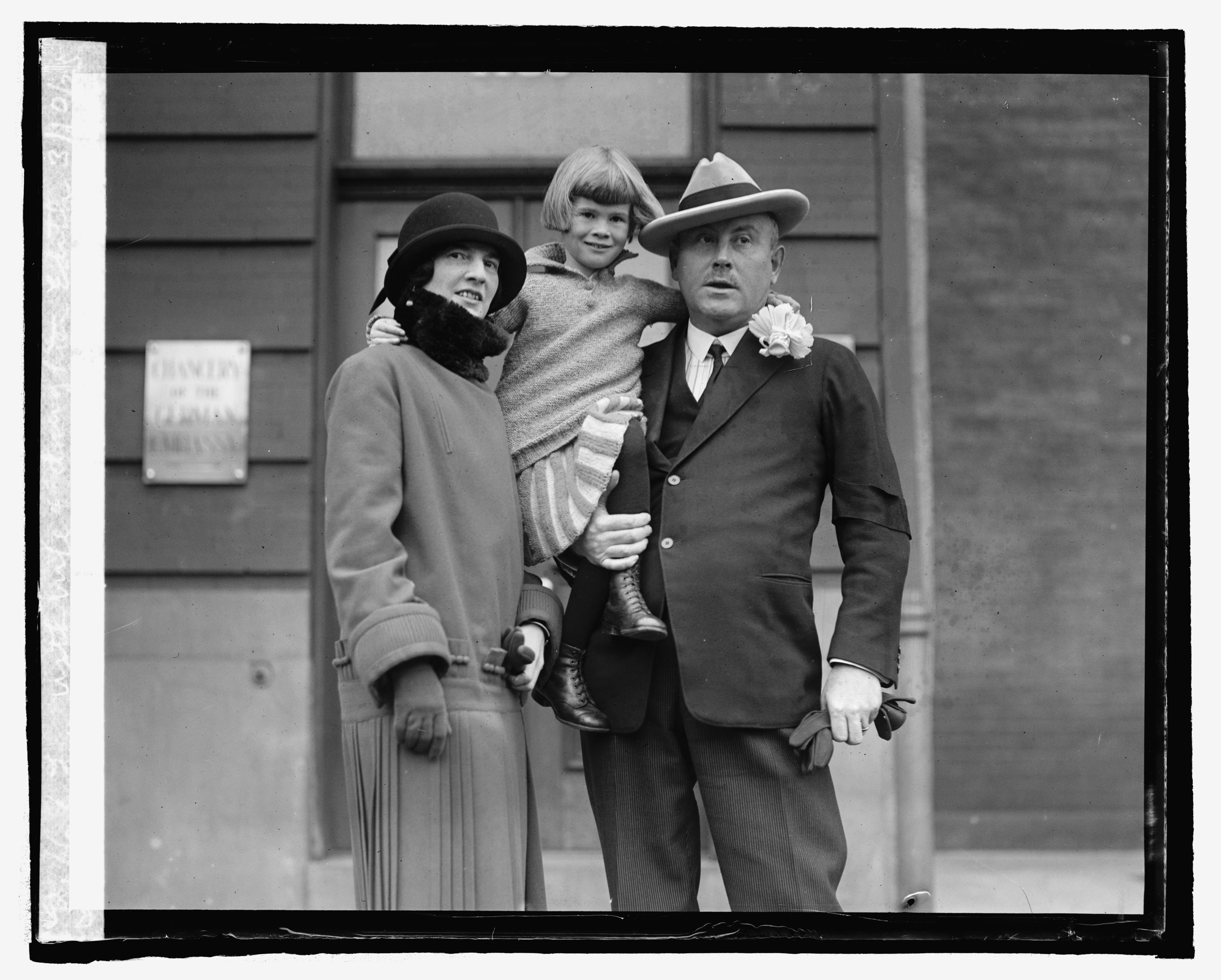
Ambassador von Maltzahn with wife and daughter Edith, 1925

In 1914, Maltzan was married to Edith Emma Henriette Marie Luise Gruson (1886–1976), a daughter of industrialist Hermann August Gruson and granddaughter of Hermann Gruson of Magdeburg. Together, they were the parents of a daughter:

- Edith Carola Adelheid Marie von Maltzan (1919–2009), who married Princeton graduate Carl Erik Hutz, a son of Dr. Rudolf Hutz of Englewood, New Jersey, in 1939. They divorced in Reno, Nevada in 1953. She later married industrialist Berthold von Bohlen und Halbach, a son of Gustav Krupp von Bohlen und Halbach and heiress Bertha Krupp of ThyssenKrupp.

During a stay at home in 1927, von Maltzan died on 23 September 1927, along with five others, when his Lufthansa monoplane crashed over Schleiz in Thüringen on the way from Berlin to Munich. His body was buried on his parents' estate in Grossen Luckow. In New York City, a memorial service was held for him at Zion Lutheran Church on the Upper East Side, which nearly 1,000 people attended including Julius P. Meyer, Rudolph Kessmeyer, Professor Theodor Wedepohl and Fritz Schroeder, and Karl von Lewinski among others. A ceremony was held for him in the Assembly Room of the Foreign Office in Berlin officiated by Foreign Minister Gustav Stresemann and attended by American Ambassador Jacob Gould Schurman. His widow died in Garmisch-Partenkirchen in Bavaria in 1976.

=== Descendants ===
Through his daughter Edith, he was posthumously a grandfather of three grandchildren: Carol Hutz (b. 1940), who married Dr Wolf Johnssen (divorced), Robert Hutz (b. 1942) who married Diane Dubé, and Eckbert von Bohlen und Halbach (b. 1956), who married Countess Désirée von Ortenburg (née Princess of Hohenzollern) in 2004. The former wife of Heinrich Franz Josef Georg Maria, Hereditary Count of Ortenburg, she is a daughter of Prince Johann Georg of Hohenzollern and Princess Birgitta of Sweden.

=== Honors and awards ===
In 1927, Marquette University in Milwaukee, Wisconsin awarded him an honorary Doctorate of Law degree "on the basis of a long, distinguished professional career, and as an expression of international good-will."
