= Julius Meyer =

Julius Meyer may refer to:

- Julius Lothar Meyer (1830–1895), German chemist
- Julius P. Meyer (1871–1945), German-American shipping executive
