= Markiny =

Markiny, Poland
- Village
- Location within Poland
- Coordinates: 54°17′N 20°45′E
- Country: Poland
- Voivodeship: Warmian-Masurian
- County: Bartoszyce
- Gmina: Bartoszyce

Markiny [marˈkʲinɨ] (German: Markienen) is a village in the administrative district of Gmina Bartoszyce, within Bartoszyce County, Warmian-Masurian Voivodeship, in northern Poland, close to the border with the Kaliningrad Oblast of Russia.

== Notable people ==
- Friedrich von Berg (1866–1939), politician
