= Abdication of Wilhelm II =

1918 renunciation of the throne of Prussia and the German Empire

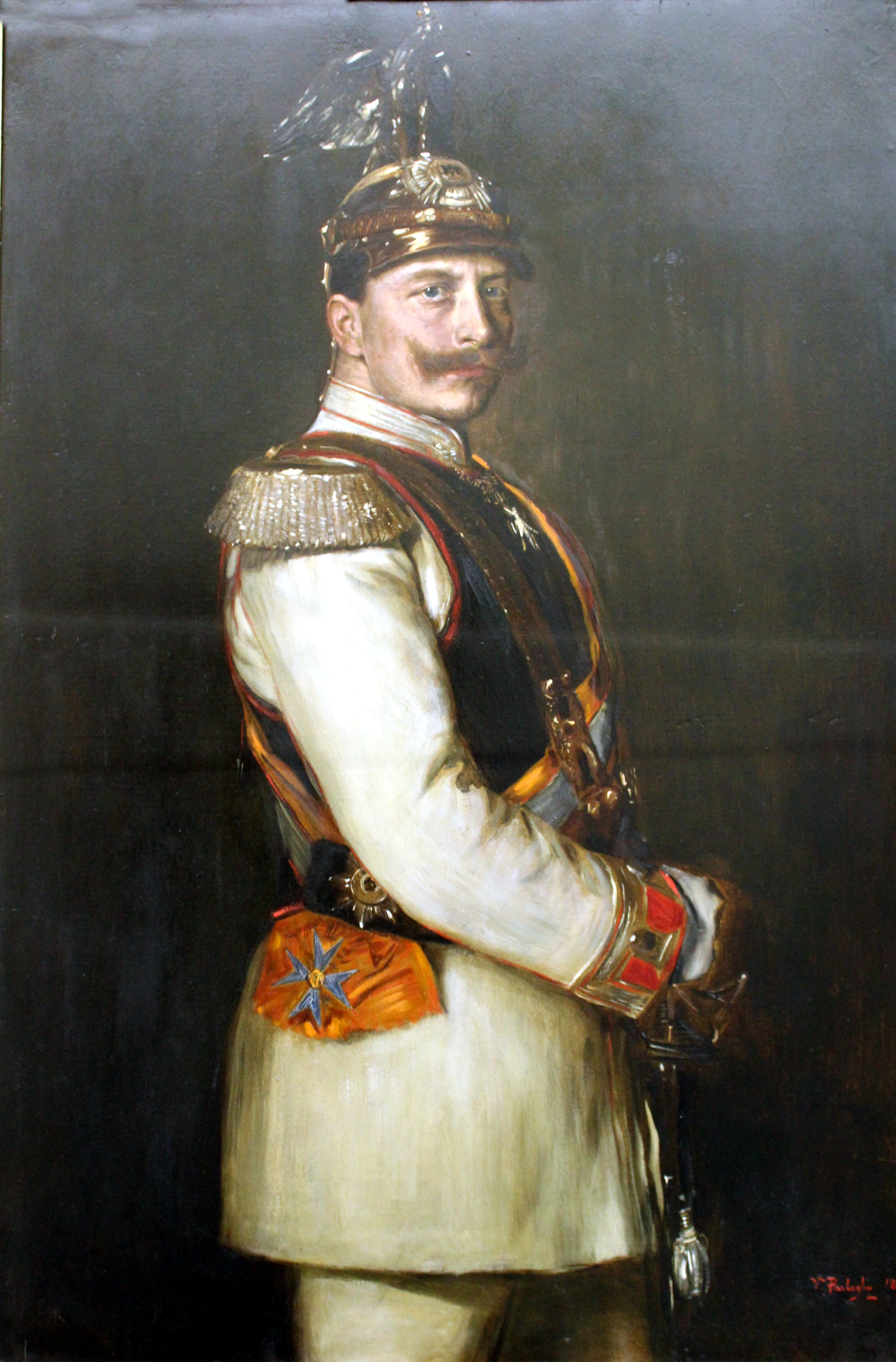
- Portrait of Emperor Wilhelm II from 1895
- Participants: Wilhelm II; Max von Baden
- Outcome: Wilhelm II formally abdicates after previously being unilaterally declared by Chancellor Max von Baden

The abdication of Wilhelm II as German Emperor and King of Prussia was declared unilaterally by Chancellor Max von Baden at the height of the German revolution on 9 November 1918, two days before the end of World War I. It was formally affirmed by a written statement from Wilhelm on 28 November while he was in exile in Amerongen, the Netherlands. The abdication ended the House of Hohenzollern's 300-year rule over Prussia and 500-year rule over its predecessor state, Brandenburg. With the loss of the monarchical legitimacy that was embodied by the emperor, the rulers of the Empire's 22 monarchical states also relinquished their royal titles and domains.

Wilhelm's abdication was triggered by Germany's impending defeat in World War I. In an attempt to obtain better terms from the Allies, a number of changes were made in the government and the constitution to partially democratise the Empire. The political changes were not enough to satisfy US President Woodrow Wilson, who was leading the attempt to broker an armistice. When it became clear that he wanted Wilhelm to abdicate, both the military and the government began to make various plans to save the monarchy through a regency or some other means after Wilhelm stepped down. The outbreak of the German revolution in the first days of November 1918 increased the pressure on Wilhelm to abdicate, but he continued to refuse. In order to calm the volatile situation in Berlin, Chancellor Baden, without Wilhelm's knowledge or approval, announced on 9 November that the Emperor had abdicated. Later that afternoon, Germany was proclaimed a republic, and Wilhelm went into exile in the Netherlands the next day. His official abdication came on 28 November. The 500-year-old Hohenzollern dynasty ended quietly, with almost no violence or fanfare.

A significant number of Germans, including many who considered themselves monarchists, saw Wilhelm's flight to the Netherlands as cowardice and desertion, a view that seriously undermined the dynasty's monarchist standing. In the military, the Supreme Army Command under Field Marshal Paul von Hindenburg quietly took over the emperor's role as "supreme warlord". In the following decades, Wilhelm hoped that the Nazis would return either him or one of his sons or grandsons to the throne, but Adolf Hitler had no interest in such a restoration.

== Lost war and revolution ==
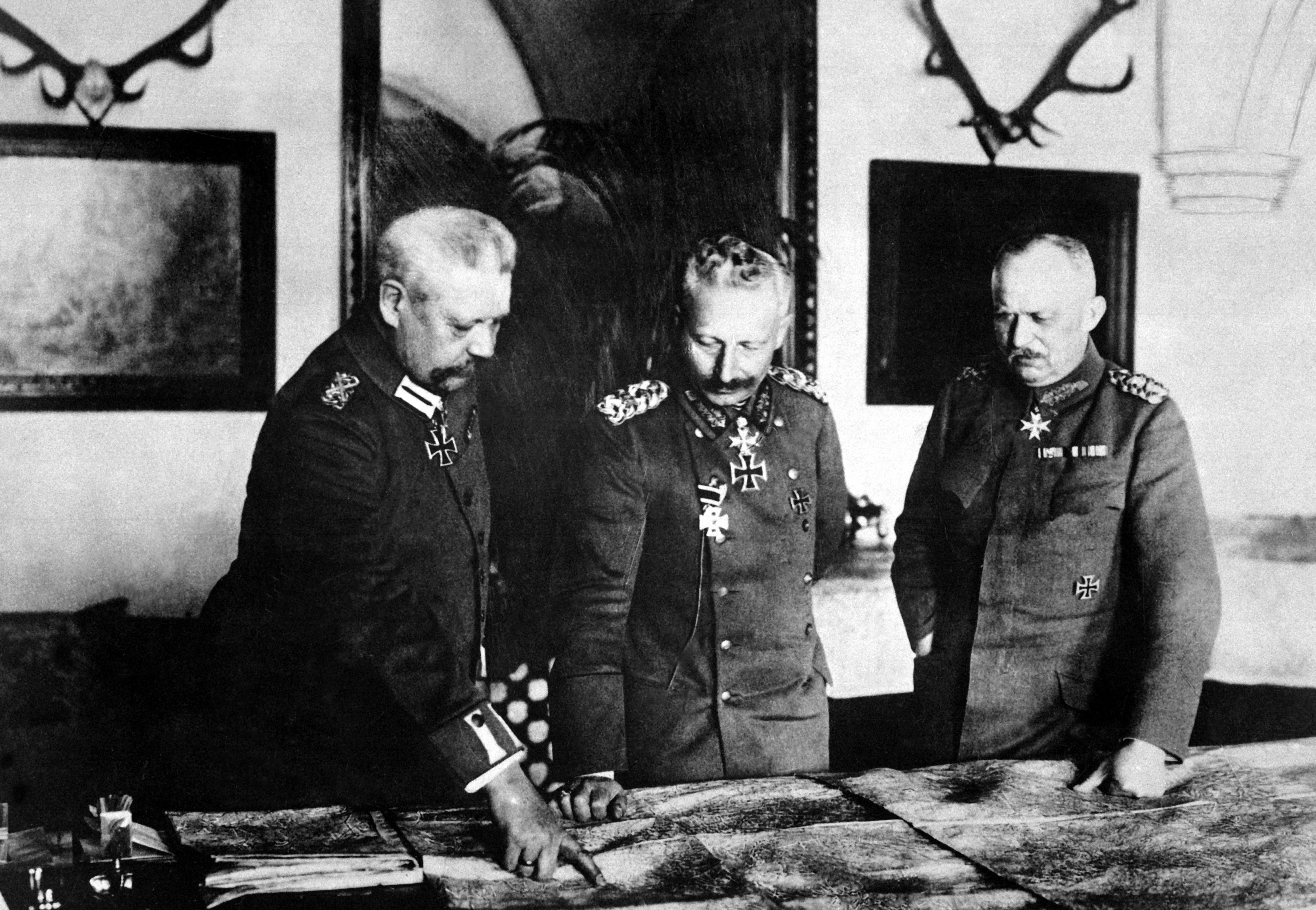
German General Headquarters, 8 January 1917. Chief of the General Staff Field Marshal Paul von Hindenburg and Wilhelm II with General Erich Ludendorff

Wilhelm first learned that Germany could not win World War I militarily on 10 August 1918, two days after the Allies broke through the German lines at the Battle of Amiens. He took the news calmly, especially since First Quartermaster General Erich Ludendorff assured him on 14 August that he would be able to break the enemy's will to fight through a determined defensive. The Emperor spent the next few weeks at Wilhelmshöhe Palace near Kassel and returned to Army Headquarters at Spa, Belgium on 10 September, where he was not told the truth about the rapidly deteriorating military and domestic political situations. Admiral Georg Alexander von Müller noted, "The dishonesty at Headquarters has reached a degree that can no longer be surpassed. Everywhere you look egoism, self-deception and deception of one's colleagues."

=== Change of government ===
On 26 September, the Supreme Army Command (OHL) summoned government leaders to its headquarters and informed Chancellor Georg von Hertling and his state secretaries (equivalent to ministers) that the war was lost. Friedrich von Berg, a member of Wilhelm's privy cabinet, began to work on forming a government that would rule in opposition to the Reichstag. He initially sounded out Bernhard von Bülow, who had been chancellor from 1900 to 1909. When Bülow responded that governing against the majority parties in the Reichstag was no longer possible, Berg suggested a dictatorship by a general such as Alexander von Falkenhausen or Max von Gallwitz, but he was again rebuffed. Paul von Hintze, the state secretary for foreign affairs, supported by Field Marshal Paul von Hindenburg and Ludendorff, proposed instead a "revolution from above": the Empire's system of rule was, at least in appearance, to be democratised, the Majority Social Democratic Party (MSPD) included in the new government and a request for peace sent to US President Woodrow Wilson. It was hoped that in this way lenient peace terms could be obtained – and that blame for the lost war could be placed at the feet of the democratic parties in the Reichstag. In order to shift responsibility away from himself, Ludendorff had planted the seeds of what later became known as the stab-in-the-back myth, the belief that Germany had not lost the war militarily but had been betrayed by people on the home front, notably socialists and Jews. The myth was fuelled by the fact that until the war was all but lost, Ludendorff left the public in the dark about the seriousness of the military situation and had even spread optimistic propaganda.

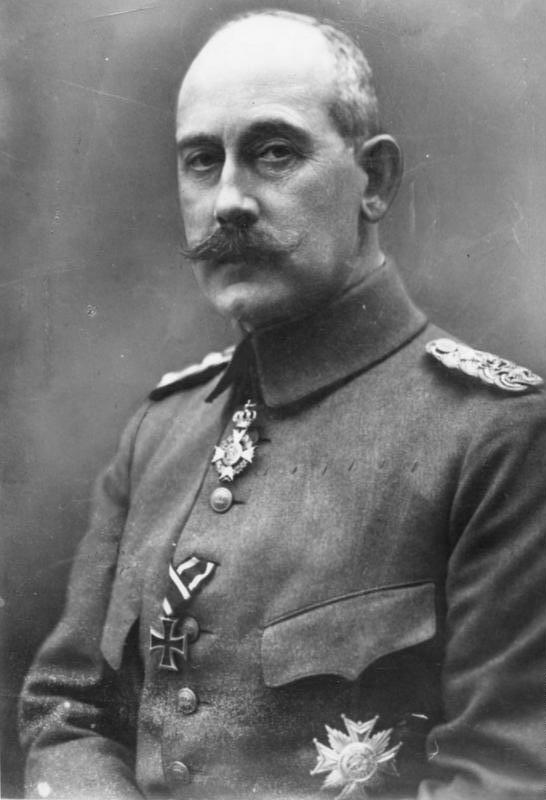
Prince Max von Baden, named chancellor of Germany as defeat in World War I became inevitable

After the Hertling cabinet resigned on 30 September, Ludendorff suggested that Prince Max von Baden, heir to the throne of the Grand Duchy of Baden, be named the new chancellor. Although Wilhelm thought little of Prince Max, he consented. Friedrich von Berg had previously obtained the Prince's agreement that as chancellor he would "resist excessive democratisation". On 2 October, Wilhelm and Max privately discussed the goals of the chancellorship in Berlin, and the following day he accepted the appointment. Baden's selections for his cabinet – which included socialists for the first time – and the replacement of Wilhelm's closest advisor Friedrich von Berg by Clemens von Delbrück as head of the privy cabinet showed that the Emperor had already lost the power to fill important posts with the men of his choice. The historian Bernd Sösemann noted a clear "decline of the imperial concept during the First World War". For the political scientist Herfried Münkler, the rise of Hindenburg and First Quartermaster General Erich Ludendorff to the top of the Army command had marked the "beginning of the end of the Hohenzollern monarchy in Germany".

=== The Wilson notes ===
On 4 October, as called for by the OHL, the new chancellor sent a diplomatic note to President Wilson asking him to mediate an immediate armistice and a peace based on his Fourteen Points. In the subsequent two exchanges, Wilson's choice of words "failed to convey the idea that the Emperor's abdication was an essential condition for peace. The leading statesmen of the Empire were not yet ready to contemplate such a monstrous possibility." As a precondition for negotiations, Wilson demanded the withdrawal of German troops from all occupied territories, the cessation of submarine activities and, implicitly, the Emperor's abdication, writing on 23 October: "If the Government of the United States must deal with the military masters and the monarchical autocrats of Germany now, or if it is likely to have to deal with them later in regard to the international obligations of the German Empire, it must demand not peace negotiations but surrender." "Impudent lout!", Wilhelm is reported to have said, adding that what the Americans were calling for was "the purest Bolshevism". At that point Ludendorff and Hindenburg called for an end to the exchange of notes with the Americans, since "throne and Fatherland" would be "at stake if there were not ... a resolute break in negotiations". Prince Max then told Wilhelm that in order to preserve the monarchy and obtain a peace that Germany would find bearable, the establishment of a parliamentary government and a reshuffle of the OHL were unavoidable.

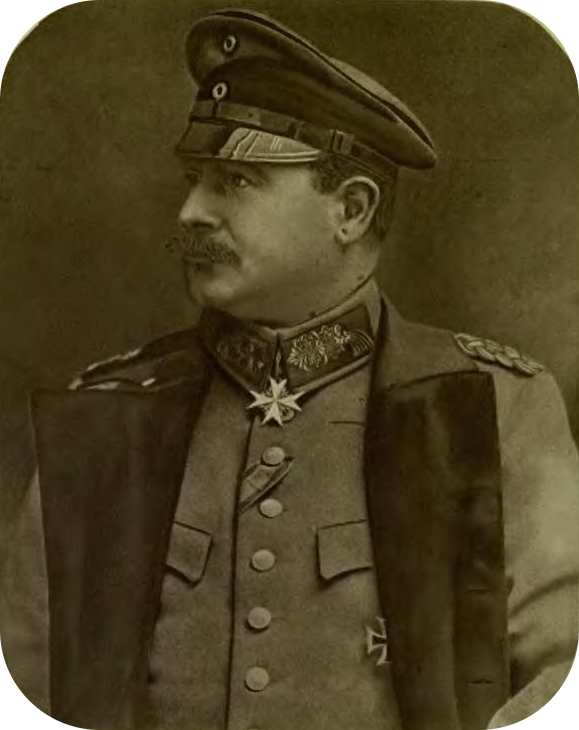
General Wilhelm Groener, who replaced Erich Ludendorff as First Quartermaster General on 26 October 1918

Wilhelm gave in and replaced Ludendorff with General Wilhelm Groener on 26 October. Two days later, the October constitutional reforms changed the German Empire from a constitutional to a parliamentary monarchy. By leaving the emperor in supreme command of the military and with the right to appoint the government, the revised constitution did not go far enough to fulfil the American conditions. The Chancellor, who had been convinced since 20 October that Wilhelm could not remain Emperor, developed a plan along with the banker Max Warburg and other advisors to save the monarchy. It called for the Emperor to step down voluntarily in favour of his twelve-year-old grandson Wilhelm, for whom Prince Max would act as regent. As administrator of the Empire, he would then appoint a democratic politician with popular support as chancellor, for example the MSPD chairman Friedrich Ebert.

The government advised the press not to discuss the "imperial question" when reporting on Wilson's notes, "since it would create an equally bad impression both internally and externally". With censorship relaxed since the change of government, the German public was already widely discussing the advantages of Wilhelm's resignation. Gustav Noske of the MSPD, for example, called for a "grand gesture" from the Emperor during a Reichstag debate on 24 October. It was almost the only call for resignation from the MSPD, however, since Ebert wanted to preserve the monarchy as far as possible and raised the idea of an imperial trusteeship for Prince Max. It was supporters of the more leftist Independent Social Democratic Party (USPD) who called not only for the abdication of the Emperor but also for an end of the monarchy. The USPD deputy Oskar Cohn ended his Reichstag speech on 25 October with the demand for a socialist republic. Two days later, demonstrators in Berlin who were celebrating the release of Karl Liebknecht from prison shouted, "Down with the Emperor!" and "Long live the German Republic!"

Wilhelm's resignation was also called for in middle-class circles that were generally monarchist. Max Warburg thought that the only possibility "for the Emperor to save the throne for his family [was] by stepping down in time." Vice Chancellor Friedrich von Payer lamented:

The very fiercest assailants of the Emperor are the people on the Right. You can hear the gentlemen of high finance and big business, even high up in officer circles, saying with astonishing candour: the Emperor must step down immediately. The longer the agitation continues, the stronger the argument will be that we no longer need a monarchy at all but should establish a republic.

Wilhelm's entourage, especially court preacher Ernst Dryander and Empress Augusta Victoria, encouraged Wilhelm to stand by his decision to remain in office.

=== Revolution ===
In view of Germany's impending defeat, the High Seas Command, without the authorization of the government, made plans for a final battle against the British fleet. If necessary to save the honour of the German Navy, they would go down heroically with flags flying. On 29 October, sailors at Kiel mutinied when they learned of the plans. The sailors then spread the revolt across Germany, and it quickly developed into the German revolution. At the same time, former Chancellor Georg Michaelis and Admiral Reinhard Scheer independently had the idea that the Emperor should seek a heroic death. Michaelis thought of sending him to the front, while Scheer wanted him to perish on board the SMS König. They hoped that his death would lead to a final mass mobilisation.

Prince Max was simultaneously trying to persuade people close to Wilhelm to encourage him to step down. Wilhelm bitterly resisted the increasing pressure and on 29 October left Berlin for the Army Headquarters at Spa. Whether it was Hindenburg, members of his entourage or someone else who persuaded him to go is not known for certain.

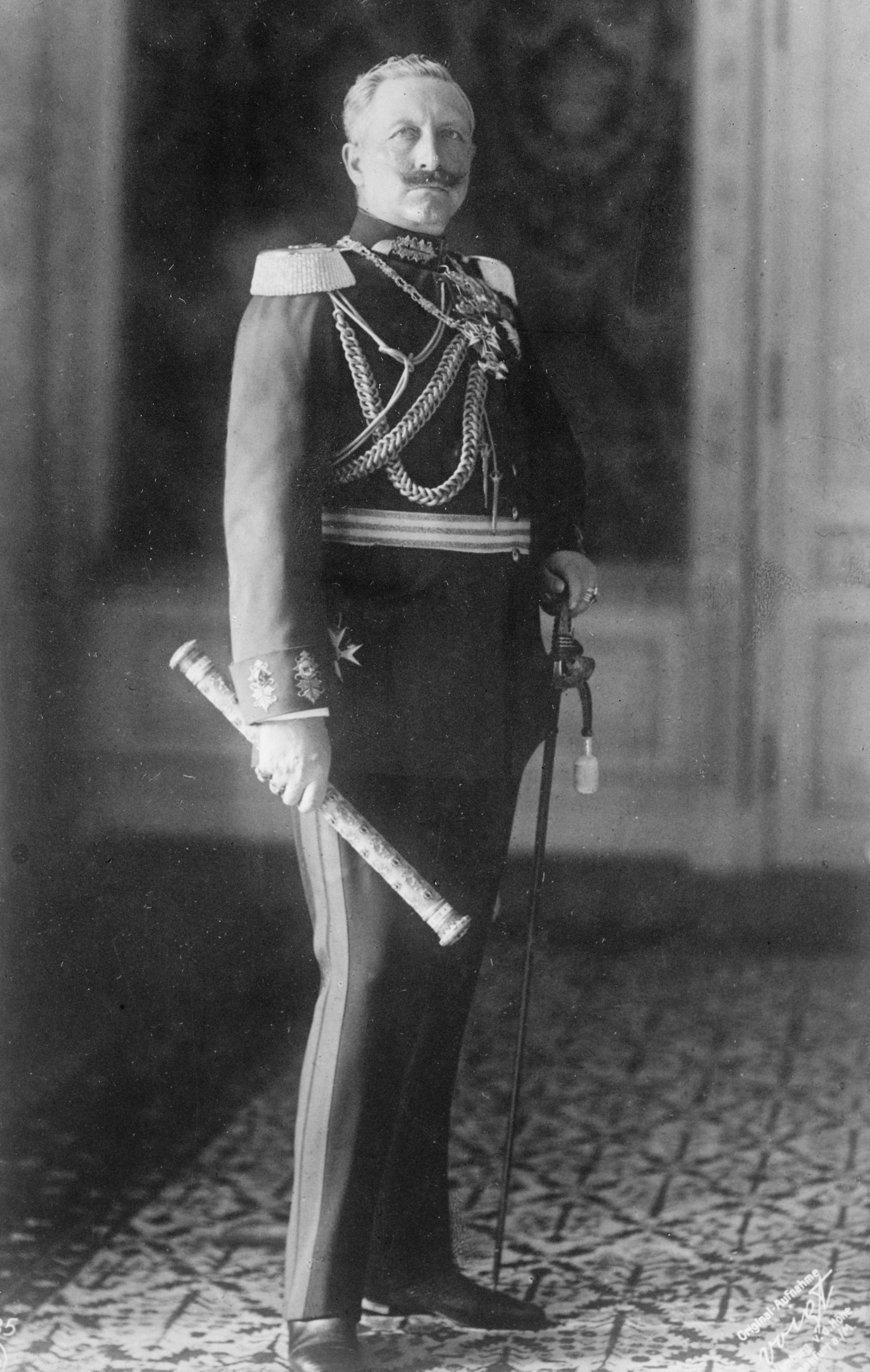
Emperor Wilhelm II in 1918

Wilhelm at that point had four possible courses of action: lead the troops to Berlin to put down the revolution, die on the battlefield, continue to delay, or abdicate and leave Germany. Wilhelm definitively ruled out the latter. On 1 November, Prince Max sent the Prussian state secretary of the interior Bill Drews to the Emperor to persuade him to abdicate, but Wilhelm insisted on his oath. If he resigned, he said, chaos would break out. According to a letter dated 3 November, he made the following comments to Drews:

All the dynasties [referring to the other monarchical Central Powers] are caving in, the Army has no leader, the front is disintegrating and flooding across the Rhine. The disloyal are massing, hanging, murdering, plundering; our enemies are helping them ... I am not even thinking of abdicating. The King of Prussia must not be unfaithful to Germany. ... I am not thinking of leaving the throne because of a few hundred Jews and a thousand labourers.

When Hindenburg and Groener joined them, Drews emphasised the position of the MSPD, which would be satisfied with an English-style parliamentary monarchy after Wilhelm's abdication, but he added that their position could change quickly if public opinion changed. The military responded by pointing out the central role of the emperor as supreme warlord: "If he leaves, the Army will fall apart and the enemy will break into the homeland unhindered."

Wilhelm, relying on Hindenburg's support and encouraged by his adjutants and the Empress, was indulging in fantasies of a coup. He repeatedly announced his intention to recapture Berlin at the head of his troops: "I would rather have my castle shot to pieces than surrender. My machine guns will write in the pavement that I will not tolerate a revolution."

On 7 November, Chancellor von Baden met with Friedrich Ebert and discussed his plan to go to Spa to convince Wilhelm to abdicate. He was thinking of naming Prince Eitel Friedrich of Prussia, Wilhelm's second son, as regent, but the outbreak of the revolution in Berlin prevented Prince Max from going to Spa. Ebert, who still hoped to save the monarchy, decided that to keep control of the situation, the Emperor had to abdicate quickly and that a new government was required.

== Unofficial abdication ==
On the morning of 9 November, the final confrontation over the Emperor's fate took place at the Hotel Britannique in Spa. Groener and Hindenburg, who for the most part remained silent, faced the other generals who believed they could save the Emperor's throne. Colonel Wilhelm Heye reported that a survey of 39 front-line officers showed that only one considered a march on Berlin to be realistic, 23 denied any prospects of success and 15 rated them as "very doubtful". The question of whether the troops would take up the fight against "Bolshevism" at home was answered in the negative by eight, while 31 considered it very unlikely. Groener said directly to the Emperor:

You no longer have an army. The Army will return home in perfect order behind its commanders and its generals, but not under the command of Your Majesty. The Army is no longer behind Your Majesty.

According to some historians, the OHL staged the presentation in order to avoid having to take responsibility for the Emperor's inevitable abdication. Siegfried A. Kaehler called it the "overthrow of the monarchy by the Army."

=== Unauthorised announcement ===
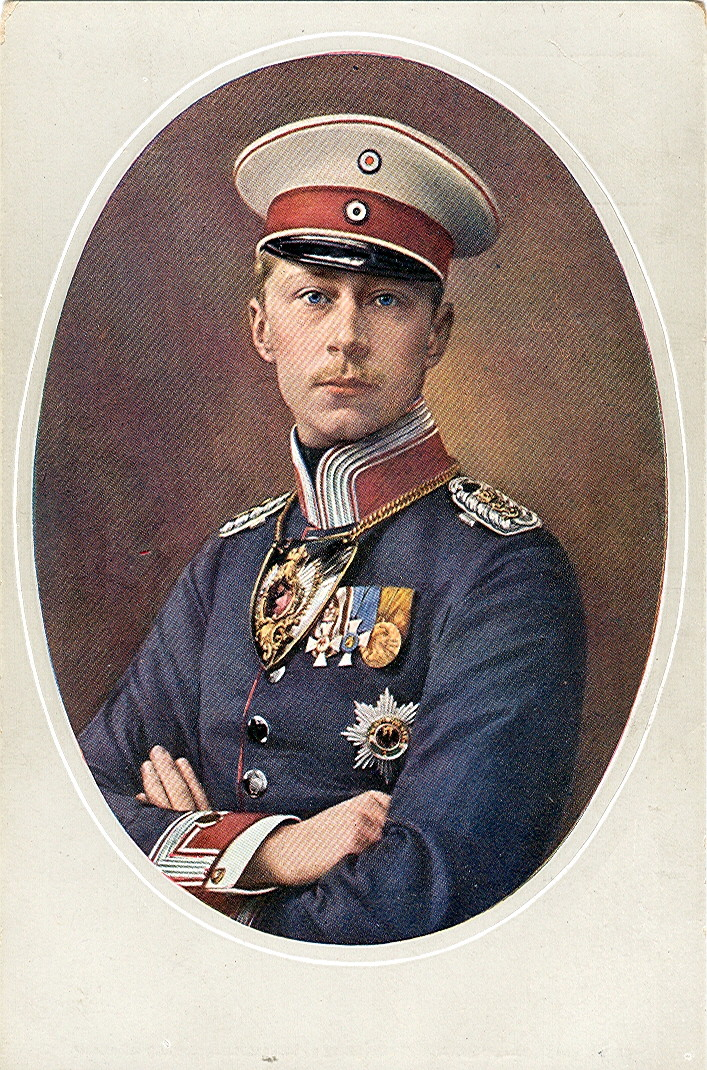
Crown Prince Wilhelm in about 1915. Chancellor Baden's announcement of his father's abdication included him as well.

In a final official act, Wilhelm handed over supreme command of the German Army to Hindenburg and then proposed that he step down as Emperor but remain King of Prussia. Unaware that a division of the two thrones was not permitted under the imperial constitution, he thought that as monarch of the state that made up two-thirds of Germany he could play a role in any new government. The official notice of his decision to abdicate as Emperor only reached Berlin at 2 p.m. on 9 November, but under the pressure of the rapidly developing revolutionary events in the capital, Prince Max had unilaterally announced that the Emperor and the Crown Prince had abdicated both crowns. The proclamation, written by privy counsellor Theodor Lewald and broadcast via the news agency Wollf's Telegraph Bureau read:

The Emperor and King has decided to abdicate the throne.

The Chancellor will remain in office until the questions connected with the Emperor's abdication, the renunciation of the throne by the Crown Prince of the German Empire and Prussia, and the establishment of the regency have been settled. He intends to propose to the Regent the appointment of Deputy Ebert as Chancellor and the submission of a bill to immediately call for general elections to a constituent German National Assembly which would be responsible for determining the final future form of government of the German people, including those parts of the people who should wish to come within the borders of the Empire.

Berlin, 9 November 1918.

The Imperial Chancellor, Prince Max von Baden.

The final statement refers to the potential union of German-Austria with the rest of Germany following the dissolution of the multi-ethnic Austro-Hungarian empire.

=== Revolutionary government ===
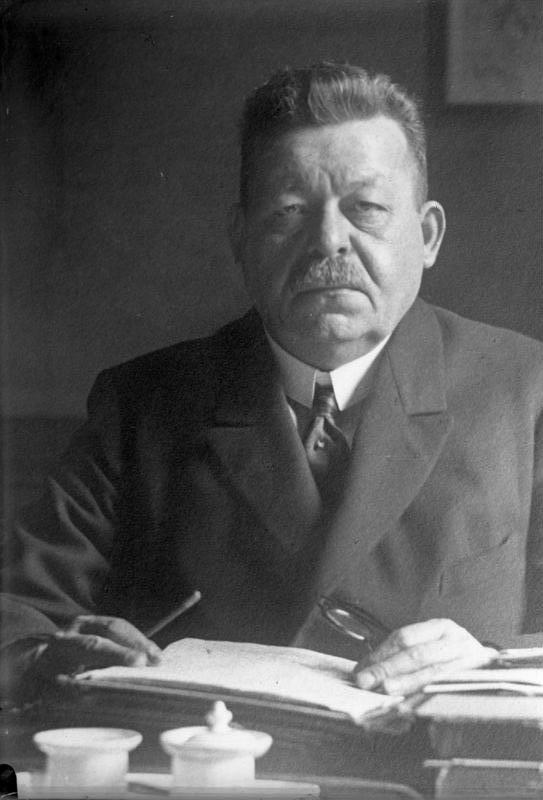
Friedrich Ebert, to whom Max von Baden handed the chancellorship. Ebert had wanted to save the monarchy but was unable to do so.

Shortly after the Chancellor's announcement, Friedrich Ebert came to the Reich Chancellery and requested the formation of an all Social Democratic government. Because the troops in the capital largely backed the Majority Social Democrats, Prince Max agreed and transferred the chancellorship to him at 12 noon. It was an illegal – or revolutionary – act, since under the imperial constitution, naming a chancellor was the sole right of the emperor.

A few hours later, a German Republic was proclaimed twice in Berlin: Philipp Scheidemann (MSPD) proclaimed the "German Republic" at 2 p.m. from the Reichstag building, while Karl Liebknecht (Spartacus League) proclaimed the "Free Socialist Republic of Germany" at 4 p.m. from the Berlin Palace. Scheidemann, acting on his own, had gone against the previous party line, since until then the Social Democrats had shown themselves to be "monarchists of reason". As late as 5 November, the party newspaper Vorwärts had warned against the establishment of a republic in which one would have to "deal with royalist Don Quixotes for perhaps 30 years". By 7 November, the party was calling for abdication but not the abolition of the monarchy. Ebert was outraged at Scheidemann because he had wanted to leave the decision on Germany's future form of government to a constituent assembly. On 10 November, the Council of the People's Deputies was formed from members of the MSPD and the USPD as Germany's interim government; Liebknecht's proclamation had no consequences.

== Flight to the Netherlands and official abdication ==
=== Decision to flee ===
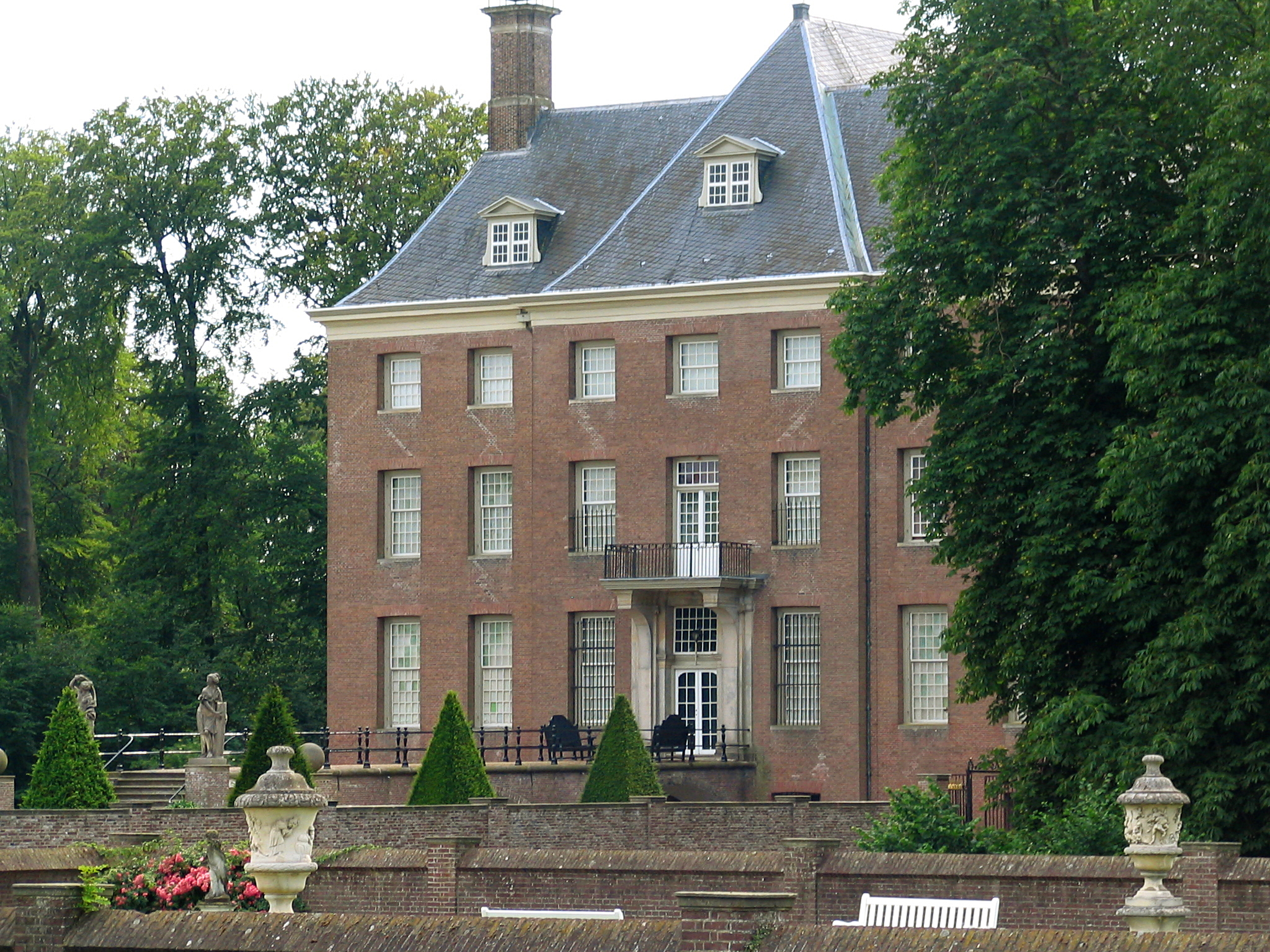
Amerongen Castle in the Netherlands, where Wilhelm II first lived after going into exile

At around 2 p.m. on 9 November, the events in Berlin became known to the OHL at Spa. Wilhelm phoned his cousin Max and called him a "scoundrel". Hindenburg, who until then had said little in the discussion about an abdication, then took the initiative. Because rumours were circulating that revolutionary troops were on their way to Spa, he tearfully advised Wilhelm to leave. He wanted at all costs to prevent him from being "dragged to Berlin by mutinous soldiers and handed over to the revolutionary government as a prisoner". Groener initially disagreed, saying that in his opinion the Emperor should quit the Army only if he abdicated first. All those present were reminded of the fate of the last Russian tsar, Nicholas II, who had been murdered by revolutionaries a few months earlier. At 4 p.m., the Emperor ordered the senior commanders to say their farewells, during which he refused to shake Groener's hand. According to a later statement by Groener, after a long period of silence, Wilhelm allowed himself to be led like a small child to his court train, which had been armed. He spent the night of 10 November there. He wrote a letter to his wife which makes clear how helpless he was and how much he misjudged the situation:

Max has fully implemented the betrayal he has been plotting with Scheidemann for weeks. Without asking me or waiting for me to make a move, he deposed me by publishing the resignation of the boy [the Crown Prince] and me behind my back. He then handed over the government to the socialists, and Ebert became chancellor. Berlin is in the hands of the Bolsheviks [...] What a terrible collapse. What a mean and vile undermining of our wonderful Army and dear old Prussian state! Ebert is staying in Bismarck's room, perhaps soon in the Palace. Since the Field Marshal told me this afternoon that he could no longer vouch for my safety among the troops, I am leaving the Army on his advice after terribly difficult [internal] struggles.

On 10 November, Wilhelm left for exile in the Netherlands, which had remained neutral throughout the war. Article 227 of the Treaty of Versailles, which was concluded in early 1919, provided for the prosecution of Wilhelm "for a supreme offence against international morality and the sanctity of treaties". Queen Wilhelmina and the Dutch government, however, refused the Allies' requests to extradite him. King George V of the United Kingdom wrote that his cousin was "the greatest criminal in history", but opposed Prime Minister David Lloyd George's proposal to "hang the Emperor". President Wilson also opposed extradition, arguing that punishing Wilhelm would destabilize international order and lose the peace.

=== Statement of abdication ===
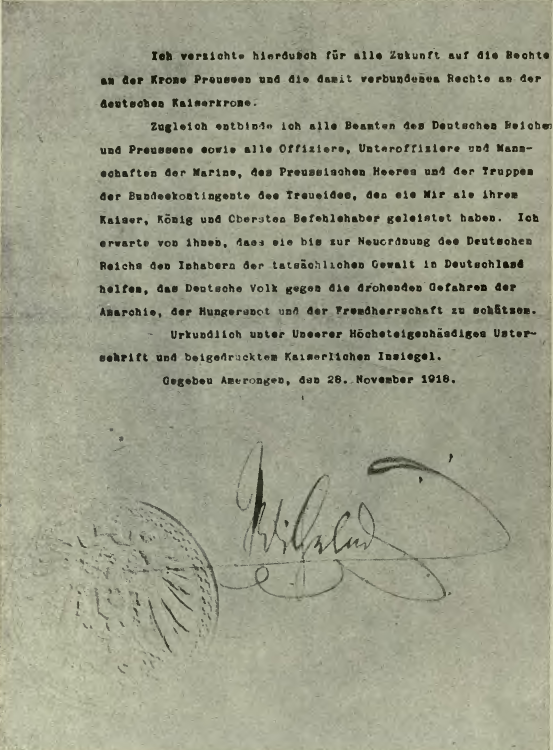
Abdication statement of Wilhelm II, signed 28 November 1918

Wilhelm first settled at Amerongen Castle. On 28 November, accepting that he had lost both of his crowns for good, he issued a belated statement of abdication of both the Prussian and imperial thrones. He also released his soldiers and officials in both Prussia and the former Empire from their oaths of loyalty to him.

I herewith renounce for all time claims to the throne of Prussia and to the German imperial throne connected to it. At the same time I release all officials of the German Empire and of Prussia, as well as all officers, non-commissioned officers and men of the Navy and the Prussian Army, as well as the troops of the federated states of Germany, from the oath of fidelity which they swore to me as their Emperor, King and Supreme Commander. I expect that until the re-establishment of order in the German Empire, they shall render assistance to the holders of power in Germany in protecting the German people from the threatening dangers of anarchy, famine and foreign rule.

Certified under our own hand and with the imperial seal attached.

Amerongen, 28 November 1918. Wilhelm.

== Impacts ==
=== Dynastic ===
The abdication of Wilhelm II marked the end of the rule of the Hohenzollern dynasty which had begun in the Margraviate of Brandenburg in 1415. Historian Hagen Schulze called "the quiet and soundless disappearance of Wilhelm II one of the "strangest events in German history", not because it marked the end of the German Empire, which was not even half a century old, but because the Prussian monarchy had simply dissolved. Centuries of history came to an end "without resistance, without struggle, without bloodshed and grand gestures [...] The fall of the monarchy was hardly worth a headline". The end of Hohenzollern rule in Prussia and the Reich also meant the end of the legitimacy of the monarchies in the constituent German states. According to historian Michael Horn, monarchical legitimacy in Germany was particularly embodied in the emperor, who was seen as a symbol of national unity. As a result, the emperor was the representative of the monarchical system throughout Germany. Wilhelm had permanently weakened it through his misdeeds and scandals until the "royalist capital" had been used up in the individual states as well.

The question of whether the outcome could have been avoided if Wilhelm had been less hesitant is answered in different ways. Legal scholar Carola Schulze thought that a timely abdication by Wilhelm II might have saved the dynastic throne, since the November Revolution was "in its essence not anti-imperial and hardly anti-dynastic". Lothar Machtan saw the end of the monarchy in Germany primarily as the result of the actions of three men who had in fact wanted to preserve it: Wilhelm II, Prince Max and Friedrich Ebert. They had become "gravediggers of the monarchy" against their will, although it could still have been saved until October 1918. But the Emperor had gambled away the monarchy with "unrivalled selfishness", Prince Max through overconfidence and cowardice and the MSPD chairman through over-reasoning and timidity. They had created a power vacuum which led to a "stillborn" republic: "The transition to democracy thus had to remain inadequate in many respects, and the German revolution's impulses for change did not bring about an irreversible departure towards freedom." Gerd Heinrich believed that democracy in Germany would have had a better chance under a regency. He based his conclusion on the judgement of Winston Churchill, who said in 1939, "The overthrow of the monarchy in Germany was our greatest political mistake."

=== Military ===
When Wilhelm II abdicated, he was legally supreme commander of the Army, and the constitution made no provision for his resignation. There was therefore danger that the OHL, which under constitutional law was his executive body, would lose its legitimacy with Wilhelm's departure and that the Army would become leaderless. Hindenburg and Groener had argued the point to Bill Drews on 1 November, but on the ninth, the issue played no role in the deliberations. The officers present contented themselves with Wilhelm's verbal declaration that Hindenburg should assume supreme command and lead the Army home. The OHL's claim to supreme military power was generally accepted in the officer corps without any formal process of persuasion. Historian Wolfram Pyta concluded that the smooth transfer of supreme command from Wilhelm to the OHL was proof that monarchical legitimacy had outlived its usefulness: "The Army too was committed to the nation; and Hindenburg was irreplaceable in November 1918, while Wilhelm II was politically as well as symbolically detachable."

== Attempts at restoration ==
=== Weimar Republic ===
The Emperor's flight to the Netherlands without thanking his people and the members of the Army who had fought in his name, as well as his refusal to seek a hero's death, became the subject of a lively debate in the early years of the Weimar Republic. A broad spectrum of the populace perceived it as a scandal, desertion and cowardice. The contemporary journalist Maximilian Harden wrote that Wilhelm as a warlord had driven millions of Germans to hell for years and had then "run away ... before the first gust of wind" – a "warlord with his trousers full" (Kriegsherr Hosenvoll). In the officer corps, crossing the border was perceived as a revocation of their oaths of allegiance. The radical right-wing captain Hermann Ehrhardt, later head of the terrorist Organisation Consul, wrote that Wilhelm was "finished" for him and his officers with his flight to the Netherlands. The historian Friedrich Meinecke judged in 1919 that although most Germans continued to feel themselves to be monarchists, the "monarchy itself dealt the death blow to all loyalty through the unworthy manner of its end, through the complete failure of its last representative in the Empire."

DNVP German National People's Party
- "The monarchical form of government corresponds to the uniqueness and historical development of Germany.... [W]e are committed to the renewal of the German Empire as established under the Hohenzollerns."

The monarchist German National People's Party (DNVP), founded on 24 November 1918, nevertheless achieved results of up to 20% of the vote in the Reichstag elections at its high point in the mid-1920s. The right-wing liberal German People's Party (DVP) also supported the monarchy as the "most suitable form of government for our people in terms of history and nature", but declared itself from the outset pragmatically willing to work within the framework of the republic.

Some Hohenzollerns thought that the National Socialists might restore the monarchy. In the late 1920s, Wilhelm's second wife, Hermine Reuss of Greiz, constantly recommended the Nazi movement to her husband as the only force that could bring him back to the throne. It was not until around 1935 that she abandoned her hopes. Wilhelm himself was disappointed by Hitler's actions. On 24 January 1933, he complained:

The confusion at home is terrible! Hitler's behaviour shows a deplorable lack of statesmanlike talent, no discipline, no knowledge of economics! He is suitable only under a firm, strong hand and within a limited scope.

Wilhelm imagined that the hand would be his. A few days before Hitler was named chancellor, he exclaimed: "Call me, I'm coming! Amen!"

=== Nazi era ===
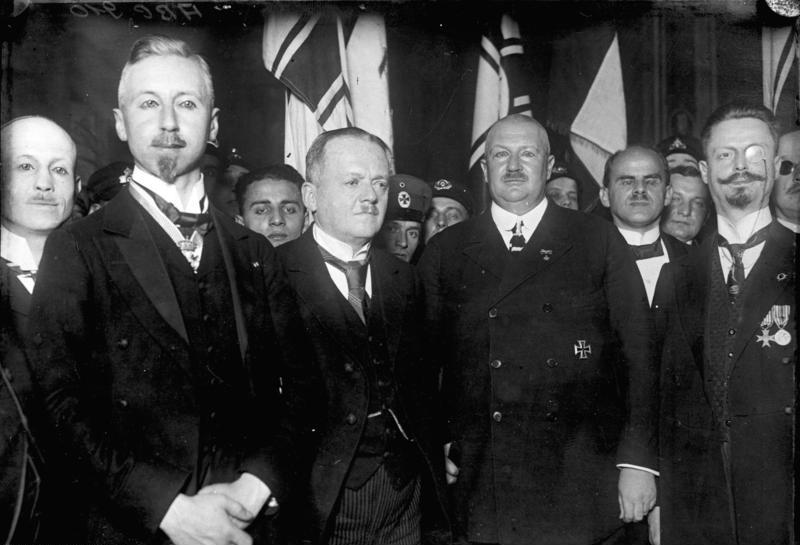
Monarchist DNVP leader Kuno von Westarp and DNVP member Prince Oskar of Prussia with Prince Eitel Friedrich. December 1924

Wilhelm had his old confidant Friedrich von Berg repeatedly sound Hitler out, but in October 1933 Hitler told him harshly that his task was to defeat communism and Judaism and that the institution of the monarchy and the Hohenzollerns were not "tough enough" to accomplish it. Shortly before, SA members had stormed a reception that monarchists had organised to celebrate Wilhelm's 75th birthday. They beat up guests, set off fireworks and smashed furniture. Gauleiter of Berlin Artur Görlitzer and Gestapo chief Rudolf Diels had previously warned against paying homage to Wilhelm and that monarchist activities would be prosecuted in the same way as those by communists. Hitler himself publicly rejected the aspirations of the Hohenzollerns in his speech on the first anniversary of his rise to power on 30 January 1934 in the National Socialist Reichstag, saying "What has been will never come again". Over the following months, the hopes harboured by the former emperor's family and their supporters that the National Socialists could be used as a vehicle to return Wilhelm to the throne increasingly faded. It had probably always been illusory.

After Prince William of Prussia, the son of the former crown prince, was killed in action in France in 1940, about 50,000 people paid their last respects following the funeral service at Sanssouci. As a result of the turnout, Hitler saw the Hohenzollerns as a threat to his power. In the Princes' Decree, he ordered that members of former ruling German aristocratic houses serving in the Wehrmacht should no longer be deployed at the front.

The former emperor Wilhelm II died in exile in the Netherlands on 4 June 1941 at the age of 82.

== See also ==
- List of German monarchs in 1918
- Former German nobility in the Nazi Party
- Abdication of Nicholas II

== Bibliography ==
- Ashton, Nigel J; Hellema, Duco (2000), "Hanging the Kaiser: Anglo-Dutch Relations and the Fate of Wilhelm II, 1918–20", Diplomacy & Statecraft, 11 (2): 53–78, doi:10.1080/09592290008406157, ISSN 0959-2296, S2CID 159993643.
- Cecil, Lamar (1996), Wilhelm II: Emperor and Exile, 1900–1941, UNC Press Books, ISBN 0-8078-2283-3, archived from the original on 2010-04-20 – via Questia.
- Czernin, Ferdinand (1964). Versailles, 1919: the Forces, Events, and Personalities that Shaped the Treaty. New York: G. P. Putnam's Sons. OCLC 711041.
- "1933 – Day of Potsdam". Landeshauptstadt Potsdam. December 2004. Archived from the original on 31 January 2023.
- Evans, Richard J. (2003). The Coming of the Third Reich. New York: Penguin Books. ISBN 978-0-143-03469-8.
- Evans, Richard J. (2005). The Third Reich in Power. New York: Penguin Books. ISBN 978-0-143-03790-3.
- Gilbert, Martin (1994). First World War (1st ed.). London: Weidenfeld and Nicolson. ISBN 978-0-297-81312-5.
- Hohenzollern, William II (1922), My Memoirs: 1878–1918, London: Cassell & Co, Google Books.
- Hohenzollern, William II (1938), The Kaiser on Hitler (PDF), Ken Magazine
- Kershaw, Ian (2008). Hitler: A Biography. New York: W. W. Norton & Company. ISBN 978-0-393-06757-6.
- Klee, Ernst: Das Personenlexikon zum Dritten Reich. Wer war was vor und nach 1945. Fischer Taschenbuch Verlag, Zweite aktualisierte Auflage, Frankfurt am Main 2005 ISBN 978-3-596-16048-8
- Klee, Ernst Das Kulturlexikon zum Dritten Reich. Wer war was vor und nach 1945. S. Fischer, Frankfurt am Main 2007 ISBN 978-3-100-39326-5
- Macdonogh (2001), The Last Kaiser: William the Impetuous, London: Weidenfeld & Nicolson, ISBN 978-1-842-12478-9.
- Manvell, Roger (2011) [1962]. Goering. Skyhorse. ISBN 978-1-616-08109-6.
- McNab, Chris (2009). The Third Reich. Amber Books Ltd. ISBN 978-1-906-62651-8.
- Nesbit, Roy Conyers; van Acker, Georges (2011) [1999]. The Flight of Rudolf Hess: Myths and Reality. Stroud: History Press. ISBN 978-0-750-94757-2.
- Palmer, Alan (1978), The Kaiser: Warlord of the Second Reich, Charles Scribner's Sons.
- Shirer, William L. (1960). The Rise and Fall of the Third Reich. New York: Simon & Schuster. LCCN 60-6729.
- Stein, Harry (2004). Buchenwald concentration camp 1937–1945. Wallstein Verlag. ISBN 3-89244-695-4.
