= Groß Vielen =

- Ortsteil of Penzlin
- Interactive map of Groß Vielen
- Location within Germany Location within Mecklenburg-Vorpommern
- Coordinates: 53°28′N 13°01′E
- Country: Germany
- State: Mecklenburg-Vorpommern
- District: Mecklenburgische Seenplatte
- Town: Penzlin

Area
  - Total: 13.29 km^{2} (5.13 sq mi)
- Elevation: 52 m (171 ft)

Population (2006-12-31)
  - Total: 373
  - Density: 28.1/km^{2} (72.7/sq mi)
- Time zone: UTC+01:00 (CET)
  - Summer (DST): UTC+02:00 (CEST)
- Postal codes: 17217
- Dialling codes: 03962
- Vehicle registration: MÜR
- Website: www.penzliner-land.de

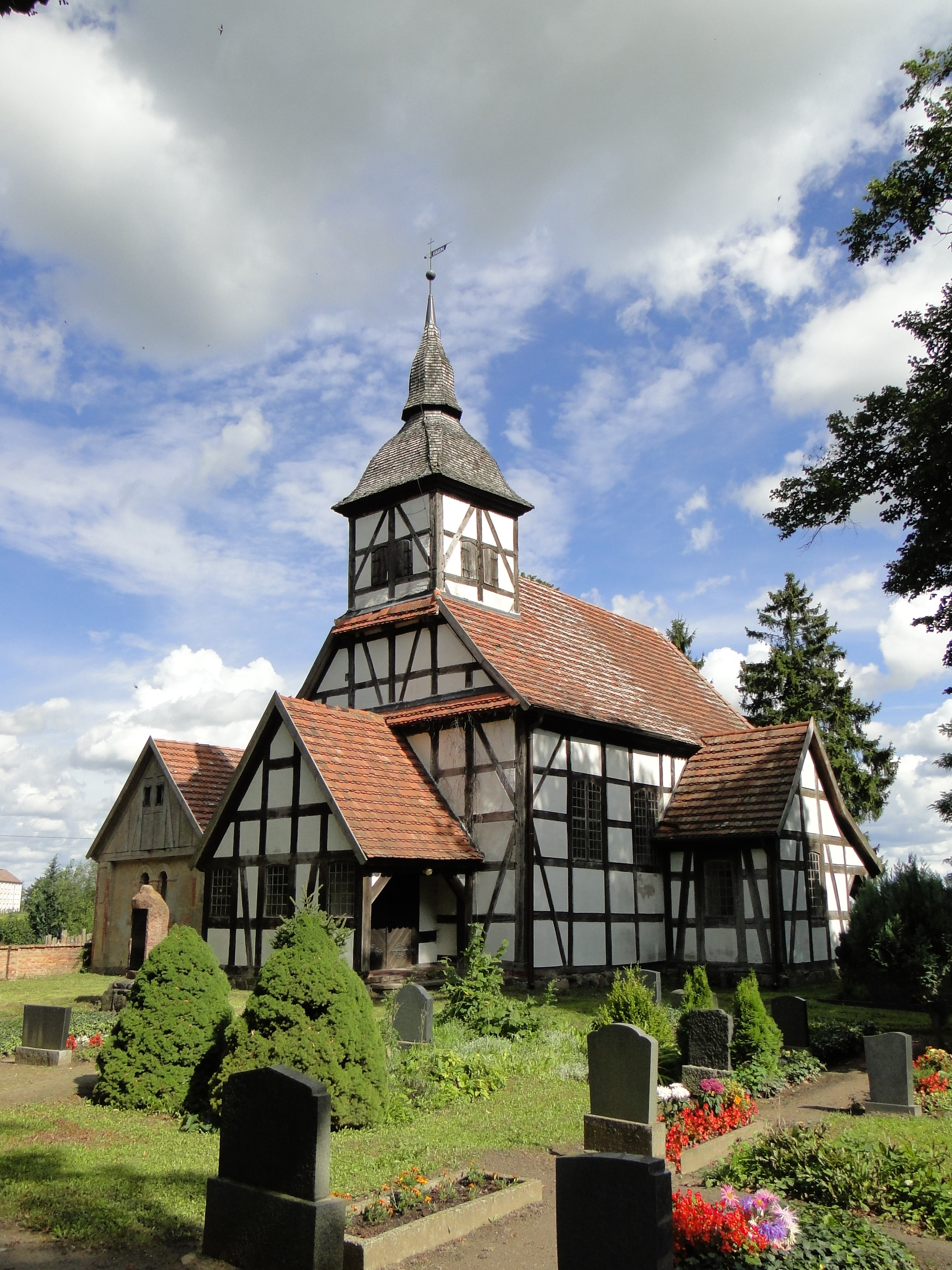
Local church

Groß Vielen is a village and a former municipality in the Mecklenburgische Seenplatte district, in Mecklenburg-Vorpommern, Germany. Since 7 June 2009, it is part of the town Attractions grade II listed timber-framed Church, built in 1774. The Bell dates from the 14th or 15th century. reconstructed Manor House in the village of za (now a therapeutic facility of the Blue Cross)Penzlin.
