= Mollenstorf =

- Ortsteil of Penzlin
- Interactive map of Mollenstorf
- Location within Germany Location within Mecklenburg-Vorpommern
- Coordinates: 53°30′N 13°01′E
- Country: Germany
- State: Mecklenburg-Vorpommern
- District: Mecklenburgische Seenplatte
- Town: Penzlin

Area
  - Total: 11.10 km^{2} (4.29 sq mi)
- Elevation: 59 m (194 ft)

Population (2006-12-31)
  - Total: 258
  - Density: 23.2/km^{2} (60.2/sq mi)
- Time zone: UTC+01:00 (CET)
  - Summer (DST): UTC+02:00 (CEST)
- Postal codes: 17217
- Dialling codes: 03962
- Vehicle registration: MÜR
- Website: www.penzliner-land.de

Mollenstorf is a village and a former municipality in the Mecklenburgische Seenplatte district, in Mecklenburg-Vorpommern, Germany. Since 7 June 2009 it has been part of the town Penzlin with which it already shared a common agglomeration.

== Geography ==
Mollenstorf is located four kilometers west of the center of Penzlin. The municipality Mollenstorf is belonged to the district Ave.

== History ==
Like Mecklenburg-West Pomerania, the area around Mollenstorf should be settled too early by Neolithic cultures. This has been proven by countless land discoveries. Far from the road from Mollenstorf to Grobviel, there are three Bronze Age burial mounds preserved as archaeological monuments.

Presumably this place was formerly known as Mollenstorp, Mollenstorf and 1558 Mollenstorf. The church was first mentioned in 1335 and is an early Gothic building in the shape of a rectangle in which the cemetery is built. A free-standing bell tower has two bells from the 14th and 15th centuries on the western side of the church.

In 1764 he bought Justus von Gundlach Gut Mollenstorf. Until 1945, he was in possession of the family. A large two-storey mansion was built around 1880. In 1897 houses of farm workers and barn were built. In 1923 the village was supplied with electricity.

== Gallery ==
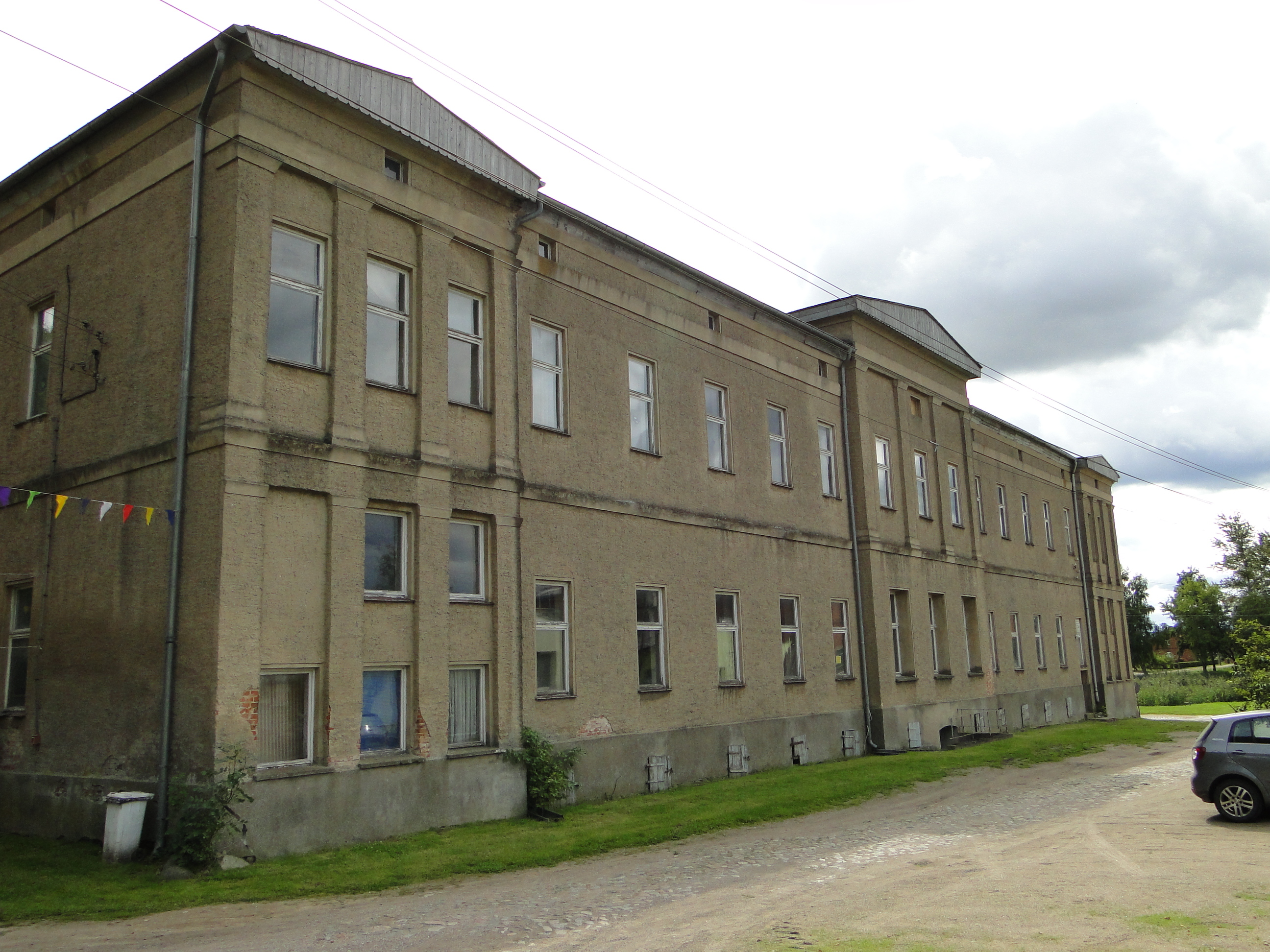

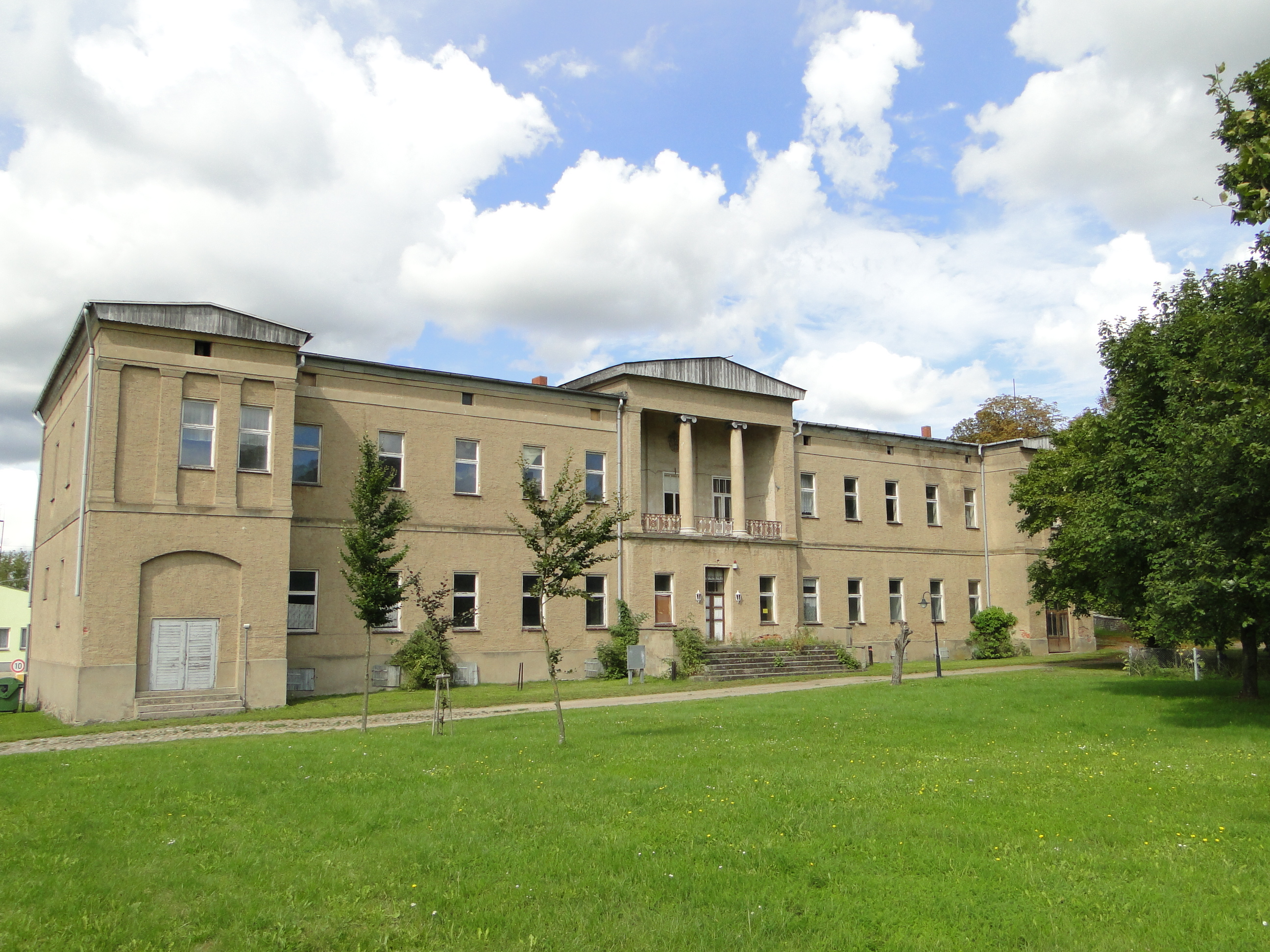

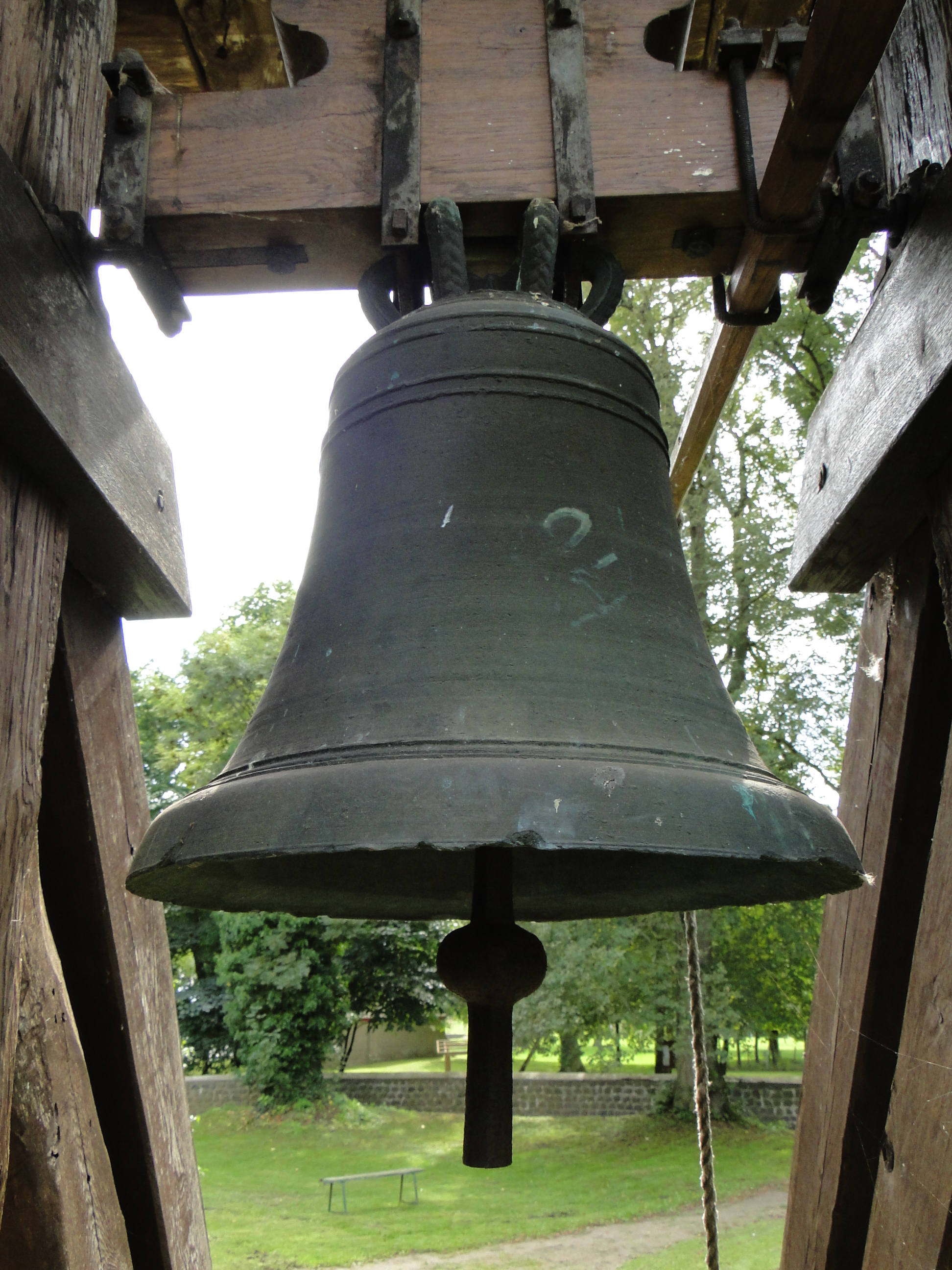

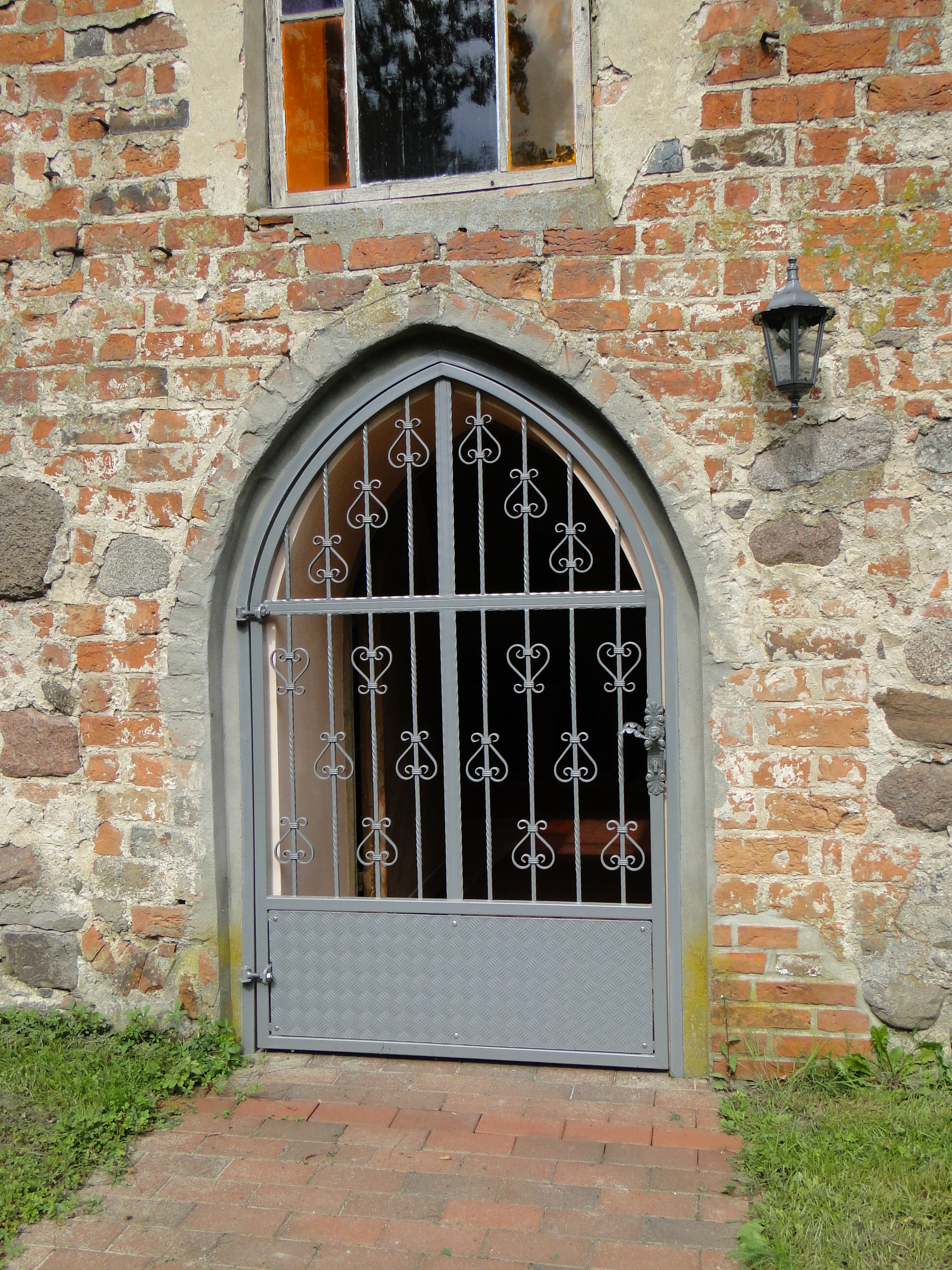
