= Mallin =

- Ortsteil of Penzlin
- Interactive map of Mallin
- Location within Germany Location within Mecklenburg-Vorpommern
- Coordinates: 53°31′59″N 13°08′12″E
- Country: Germany
- State: Mecklenburg-Vorpommern
- District: Mecklenburgische Seenplatte
- Town: Penzlin

Area
  - Total: 10.63 km^{2} (4.10 sq mi)
- Elevation: 64 m (210 ft)

Population (2010-12-31)
  - Total: 373
  - Density: 35.1/km^{2} (90.9/sq mi)
- Time zone: UTC+01:00 (CET)
  - Summer (DST): UTC+02:00 (CEST)
- Postal codes: 17217
- Dialling codes: 03962
- Vehicle registration: MÜR
- Website: www.penzliner-land.de

Mallin is a village and a former municipality in the Mecklenburgische Seenplatte district, in Mecklenburg-Vorpommern, Germany. Since 1 January 2012, it is part of the town Penzlin.
