= Wolf-Eberhard von Lewinski =

German music and theatre critic

- Born: Wolf-Eberhard Georg Felix von Lewinski; 2 June 1927; Berlin
- Died: 23 March 2003 (aged 75); Calw, Germany
- Education: Musikhochschule Dresden
- Occupations: Conductor; Music critic; Theatre critic; Academic teacher
- Awards: Gutenberg Plaque of Mainz

Wolf-Eberhard Georg Felix von Lewinski (2 June 1927 – 23 March 2003) was a German music and theatre critic. He studied violin, piano, trombone, conducting, theatre and opera direction, but turned to musical criticism early. He was chief critic for papers in the Rhein Main area, and worked for several newspapers and broadcasters. He wrote biographies of singers such as Dietrich Fischer-Dieskau and Brigitte Fassbaender, and created television portraits of pianists such as Claudio Arrau and Wilhelm Kempff. He was also an academic lecturer of musical criticism.

== Life ==
=== Youth and study ===
Von Lewinski was born in Berlin, the son of the bank director Ernst-Alfred von Lewinski, members of the noble Lewinski family. He contracted a heart disease after finishing school in 1944 as an Luftwaffenhelfer, which led to his suspension from military service. In autumn 1944, he was therefore able to study music at the Musikhochschule Dresden, with a focus on violin, which he extended after the Second World War to include conductor training with Walther Meyer-Giesow, Hermann Abendroth and Joseph Keilberth. He also studied trombone, piano, conducting and opera directing as well as theatre, literature and art history.

=== Conductor and artistic director ===
In 1948 he made his first public appearance as a conductor and subsequently conducted, among others, the Eisenach Philharmonic Orchestra and the Dresdner Philharmonie. Towards the end of his professional career, Lewinski was intendant of the Staatsphilharmonie Rheinland-Pfalz from 1983 to 1992. During his leadership, the orchestra played new concert series, with soloists such as Claudio Arrau and Krystian Zimerman, and played at new locations such as Frankfurt-Feste, Ludwigsburger Schlossfestspiele, in Vienna, the Royal Albert Hall in London, and on tours to Spain, Sweden and Poland.

=== Music critic and author ===
More important than his only brief musical activity was Lewinski's work as music critic after 1947. After moving to Darmstadt in 1951, he first wrote mainly for the Darmstädter Tagblatt, later also for the Wiesbadener Tagblatt and Die Welt. He also worked for the Süddeutsche Zeitung, Christ und Welt and Westermanns Monatshefte and wrote radio features for various broadcasting companies. Since 1971, von Lewinski has worked for the ZDF and the Saarländischer Rundfunk. In the course of his long-standing collaboration with Peter Rocholl, the SR music director and long-standing music coordinator of the ARD, he created highly acclaimed television portraits of the pianists Claudio Arrau, Andor Foldes and Wilhelm Kempff as well as on the vocal soloists Viorica Ursuleac, Elisabeth Schwarzkopf, Dietrich Fischer-Dieskau, Peter Schreier and Hans Hotter. In 1978, Lewinski took over the position of chief music critic at the Verlagsgruppe Rhein-Main of several papers in the region.

=== Teaching ===
In 1979, Lewinski began teaching at the Musikhochschule Köln and at Dr. Hoch's Konservatorium in Frankfurt as the head of the seminar Music Criticism and Comparative Interpretation Studies. He gave courses in Hanover, Munich, at the Herbsttage Iserlohn and at the Tage Alter Musik in Innsbruck.

Lewinsky died in Calw at the age of 75.

== Family ==
Lewinski was married and had three daughters, some of whom also took up an artistic profession.

== Awards and memberships ==
- Golden Order of Merit of the Province of Salzburg
- Member of the Deutsche Phono-Akademie
- Member of the Rhineland-Palatinate State Music Council
- Member of the board of the Frankfurter Bachkonzerte association
- 2000: Gutenberg Plaque of Mainz

== Work ==
Musician's biographies by von Lewinski are held by the German National Library:

- Ludwig Hoelscher, 1967, Verlag Hans Schneider Tutzing
- Musik – wieder gefragt, 1967, Claassen-Verlag, Düsseldorf
- Artur Rubinstein, 1967 Rembrandt-Verlag. Berlin
- Anneliese Rothenberger, 1968, Friedrich-Verlag, Velber
- Joseph Keilberth, 1968, Rembrandt-Verlag, Berlin
- Andor Foldes, 1970, Rembrandt-Verlag, Berlin
- Gideon Kremer, 1982, W. Goldmann Verlag and Schott, Mainz
- Dietrich Fischer-Dieskau, 1988, Piper, Munich, and Schott
- Peter Schreier, 1992, Piper and Schott
- Brigitte Fassbaender, 1999, Atlantis and Schott
