= Lewinski family =

Noble family

Coat of arms of the Lewinski family

The Lewinski family is an old German noble family of Pomerelian–Kashubian descent.

== History ==
The family was originally called Royk. Under Polish rule, it took the name of its long-standing possession Lewyn (today known as Lewino), for which the Polish King Sigismund I had confirmed a hereditary noble possession to Jacob Royk in 1526:

"The privilege was given to the noble [...] heirs of James of the town of Lewyn in the land of Pomerania and the district of Mirochov"
– Crown register No. 42 p. 125 from July 28, 1526, "The privilege of the nobles over the goods of Lewyn".

In the 16th and 17th centuries, the family bore the name von Royk Lewinski. The last of his family, Andreas Royk, is mentioned in 1662 as a taxpayer in Lewino. While one of his two sons settled in Kositzkowo, and his descendants can be traced there until the 20th century, the other son and his descendants lived on further property in Łebno and later in Tockar, Kreis Karthaus/West Prussia. The last of this branch of the family, born in Dargelow in 1747, left Kashubia and entered Prussian service. At the beginning of the 18th century, only the name Lewinski appears in the documents.

In the 1970s, a City University of New York political science professor, Anne Armstrong, who was known as the Baroness von Royk-Lewinski, ran in the Republican primary in Bergen County, New Jersey.

=== Coat of arms ===
The family's coat of arms are red with a silver lion holding a sword in its forepaws. On the helmet with red and silver covers are three ostrich feathers (red, silver, red).

== Notable members ==
- Eduard von Lewinski (1829–1906), Prussian artillery general
- Alfred von Lewinski (1831–1906), Prussian infantry general
- Karl von Lewinski (officer) (1858–1937), Prussian lieutenant general
- Alfred von Lewinski (born 1862) (1862–1914), Prussian major general
- Karl von Lewinski (1873–1951), German lawyer and diplomat
- Oskar von Lewinski (1873–1913), Prussian officer and military attaché
- Erich von Manstein (born von Lewinski) (1887–1973), German Field Marshal
- Henning von Lewinski (1902–1981), Diplomat and naval officer
- Wolf-Eberhard von Lewinski (1927–2003), German music and theatre critic
- Anne von Royk-Lewinski (c. 1925–2002), American politician and university professor
- Kai von Lewinski (b. 1970), German lawyer and university professor

== Literature ==
- Genealogisches Handbuch des Adels, (GHdA), C. A. Starke Verlag. ISSN 0435-2408 (Auszug):
  - Hans Friedrich von Ehrenkrook, Friedrich Wilhelm Euler, Jürgen von Flotow: Genealogical Handbook of the Noble Houses B (Letter Family), Volume I, Volume 9 of the complete series GHdA, Glücksburg/Ostsee 1954, p. 253 ff.
  - Walter von Hueck: Genealogical Handbook of the Nobility. Noble Houses B. Volume XV, Volume 83 of the complete series GHdA, Limburg an der Lahn 1984, p. 296 f.
  - GHdA: Dictionary of Nobility. Volume VII, Volume 97 of the entire GHdA series, Limburg an der Lahn 1989, p. 325 ISBN 3-7980-0700-4.
  - Genealogical Handbook of the Nobility. Noble Houses B. Volume XXVI, Volume 140 of the complete series GHdA, Limburg an der Lahn 2006, p. 249 ff.
- Gotha, Justus Perthes. (excerpt):
  - Gotha Genealogical Pocketbook of the Letter Noble Houses: 1909, Gotha 1908, S. 485 ff. Lewinski Stamm Tempski
  - Gotha Genealogical Pocketbook of the Letter Noble Houses: 1913, Gotha 1912. S. 484 ff. Lewinski Stamm Tempski
  - Gotha Genealogical Pocketbook of the Noble Houses (Old Nobility and Letter Nobility): 1930 (Alter Adel und Briefadel gen.), Vol. 22, Gotha 1929, p. 502 ff. Also the Nobility Register of the United German Nobility Associations.
