= Penzlin =

Town in Mecklenburg-Vorpommern, Germany

- Town
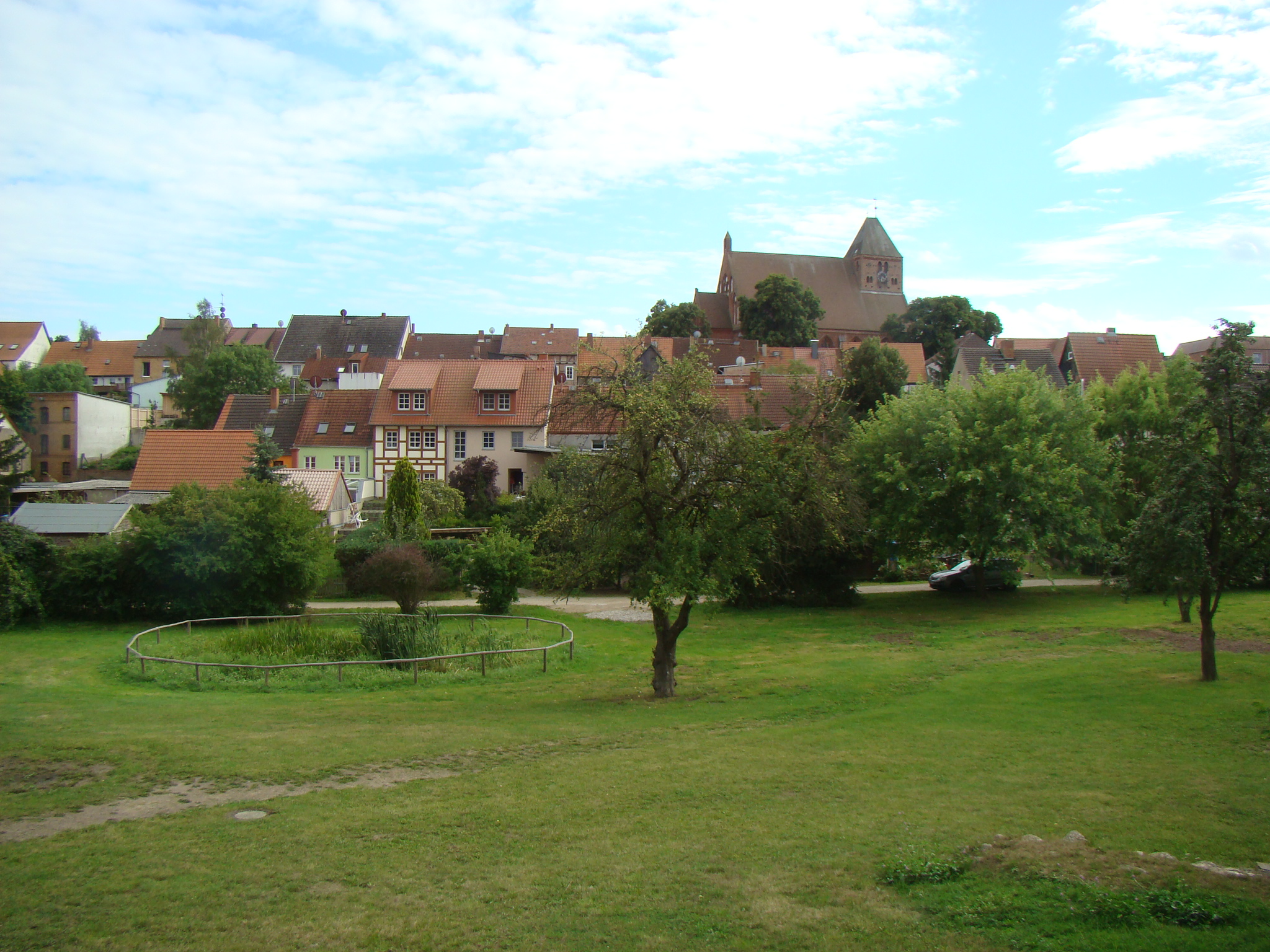
- View towards the old town of Penzlin

- Flag Coat of arms

- Location of Penzlin within Mecklenburgische Seenplatte district
- Interactive map of Penzlin
- Location within Germany Location within Mecklenburg-Vorpommern
- Coordinates: 53°30′18″N 13°04′59″E
- Country: Germany
- State: Mecklenburg-Vorpommern
- District: Mecklenburgische Seenplatte
- Municipal assoc.: Penzliner Land

Government
  - Mayor: Sven Flechner

Area
  - Total: 115.56 km^{2} (44.62 sq mi)
- Elevation: 48 m (157 ft)

Population (2025-12-31)
  - Total: 4,036
  - Density: 34.93/km^{2} (90.46/sq mi)
- Time zone: UTC+01:00 (CET)
  - Summer (DST): UTC+02:00 (CEST)
- Postal codes: 17217, 19219
- Dialling codes: 03962, 39928
- Vehicle registration: MÜR
- Website: www.penzlin.de

Penzlin (German pronunciation: [ˈpɛntsliːn]) is a town in the Mecklenburgische Seenplatte district, in Mecklenburg-Vorpommern, Germany. It is situated 13 km southwest of Neubrandenburg, and 27 km east of Waren. In July 2008 it absorbed the former municipality Alt Rehse, in June 2009 the former municipalities Groß Vielen, Groß Flotow, Marihn and Mollenstorf, in January 2011 Klein Lukow and in January 2012 Mallin.

== Sister cities ==
- Otterndorf, Germany
- Łęczyca, Poland
