= Friedrich Wilhelm von Prittwitz und Gaffron =

German ambassador (1884–1955)

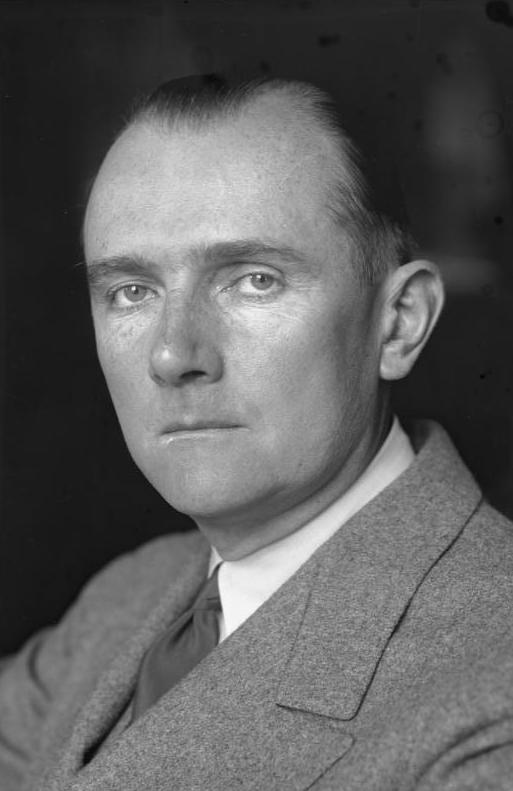
- Prittwitz in 1931

German Ambassador to the United States
- In office 1928–1933
- Preceded by: Adolf Georg von Maltzan
- Succeeded by: Hans Luther

Personal details
- Born: 1 September 1884 Stuttgart, Württemberg
- Died: 1 September 1955 (aged 71) Tutzing, Starnberg, Bavaria
- Spouse: Marie Luise von Strachwitz und Groß-Zauche (m. 1920; died 1955)
- Education: University of Bonn; University of Berlin
- Alma mater: University of Leipzig

Friedrich Wilhelm von Prittwitz und Gaffron (1 September 1884 – 1 September 1955) was a German Ambassador to the United States under the Weimar Republic, from 1928 until 14 April 1933. He was in office at the time that Adolf Hitler came to power in Germany, and resigned from the diplomatic corps in protest the day after Hitler was appointed Chancellor. He had hosted German Jewish playwright Lion Feuchtwanger at a dinner that day. On the day of his resignation, Prittwitz called Feuchtwanger and recommended that he not return to Germany. In 1945 he was a founding member of the Christian Social Union in Bavaria, and he served as a member of the Parliament of Bavaria from 1946 to 1954.

== Early life ==
Prittwitz was born on 1 September 1884 in Stuttgart, Württemberg into an old Silesian noble family von Prittwitz and was the son of the Royal Prussian Colonel Arwed von Prittwitz und Gaffron and Sarah née Baroness Schott von Schottenstein. His younger brother was Erich von Prittwitz und Gaffron. The German General Heinrich von Prittwitz und Gaffron was a cousin.

He studied law at the University of Bonn and Berlin and became a member of the Corps Borussia Bonn in 1903. In 1907 he received his doctorate from the Law Faculty of the University of Leipzig.

== Career ==
In 1908 he entered the Diplomatic Service. At the beginning he was employed as an attaché at the German Embassy in Washington, D.C. until 1910. He then was stationed in the political department of the Foreign Office and at the German Embassy in Saint Petersburg. At the beginning of the war in 1914, he was commissioned as a Lieutenant in the reserve, but returned slightly wounded in November 1914 and remained in the Foreign Office until the end of the war.

After joining the German Democratic Party, von Prittwitz unsuccessfully ran for a seat in the first Reichstag of the Weimar Republic. After his defeat, von Prittwitz applied for a post abroad and, at the end of 1920, he was sent as consul to Trieste, but just four months later he was appointed Deputy Embassy Councilor at the German embassy in Rome and later promoted to Embassy Councilor there. During his time in Rome, he witnessed the fascists taking power in Italy under Mussolini and was able to observe the first years of the development of the fascist state up close.

=== Envoy to the United States ===
Emil Ludwig and Ambassador von Prittwitz at the White House, 1928

In 1927, von Prittwitz, who was only 43 years old, was appointed German ambassador to the United States by Foreign Minister Gustav Stresemann, in spite of concerns by President Paul von Hindenburg and conservative faction in the Reichstag. An ally of the American Democrats, he rejected the divisions of pre-war period and presented himself as a representative of the German people to the American people, advocating that diplomacy should serve world peace. He promoted economic ties, but he placed particular emphasis on the cultural ties between the two countries. He was often a guest of Adolph Ochs, the owner of the New York Times. He also referred to the Revolution of 1848 as a link between Germany and the United States, as it was not only the birth of democracy in Germany, but also led to many German Democrats emigrating to the United States.

On 15 April 1933, Prittwitz resigned as ambassador to Washington in protest the day after Hitler was appointed Chancellor, handing over duties to the former Reich Chancellor and Finance Minister Hans Luther. Upon his return to Germany (aboard the Europa), he met with Hitler before retiring from the diplomatic service on 18 July 1933.

=== Later life ===
As his beliefs were in contrast to the new rulers in Germany, the National Socialists, Prittwitz hoped that other ambassadors would join in their resignations, but remained the only one. After his retirement, he made his home at Lake Starnberg, under Gestapo surveillance.

After the Third Reich, he again became politically active, but no longer held a high position. He was one of the founding members of the Christian Social Union in Bavaria. He was a member of the Landtag of Bavaria from 1946 to 1954, and was directly elected in the Würzburg constituency in 1950. Von Prittwitz advocated international understanding and the reunification of Germany. In 1948, together with Waldemar von Knoeringen and Thomas Dehler, he founded the Society for Foreign Studies (German: Gesellschaft für Außenpolitik), of which he served as the first chairman.

== Personal life ==
On 21 December 1920 he married Countess Marie Luise von Strachwitz und Groß-Zauche (1892–1986) in Berlin. She was the daughter of the Royal Prussian Landwehr Count Adalbert von Strachwitz und Groß-Zauche and the Baroness Maria von Saurma und der Jeltsch.

Prittwitz died on 1 September 1955 in Tutzing, Starnberg, Bavaria.

== Honours ==
- Honorary doctorate, Columbia University
