= Karl von Lewinski =

Karl Hermann Eduard Reinhold von Lewinski (2 December 1873 – 29 October 1951) was a German lawyer and diplomat.

== Early life ==
Lewinski was born on 2 December 1873 in Strasburg, Germany into the noble Lewinski family. He was the son of Prussian officer August Louis von Lewinski (1832–1881) and Antonie Marie Jakobine Ernestine (née Mayer) von Lewinski.

His paternal grandparents were Lt.-Col. August Jakob von Lewinski and Charlotte Wilhelmine (née Seydel). Among his large extended family were uncles Eduard von Lewinski and Alfred von Lewinski, both Prussian Generals. His maternal grandparents were Dr. Carl Wilhelm Mayer, Privy Medical Councillor (German: Geheimer Sanitätsrat), and Wilhelmine Emilie Henriette Martins.

Lewinski studied law at the University of Breslau and the Ludwig-Maximilians-Universität München from 1892 to 1899, where he became a member of the Corps Ratisbonia in 1893.

== Career ==
After receiving his legal training, Lewinski became a court assessor in Breslau in 1903, and an assistant in the Ministry of Justice (German: Reichsjustizministerium) in 1905. In 1907, he became a district judge, but interrupted his judicial career in 1909 to study law at Harvard Law School in the United States. While in the U.S., he was an instructor at Columbia University.

=== World War I and aftermath ===
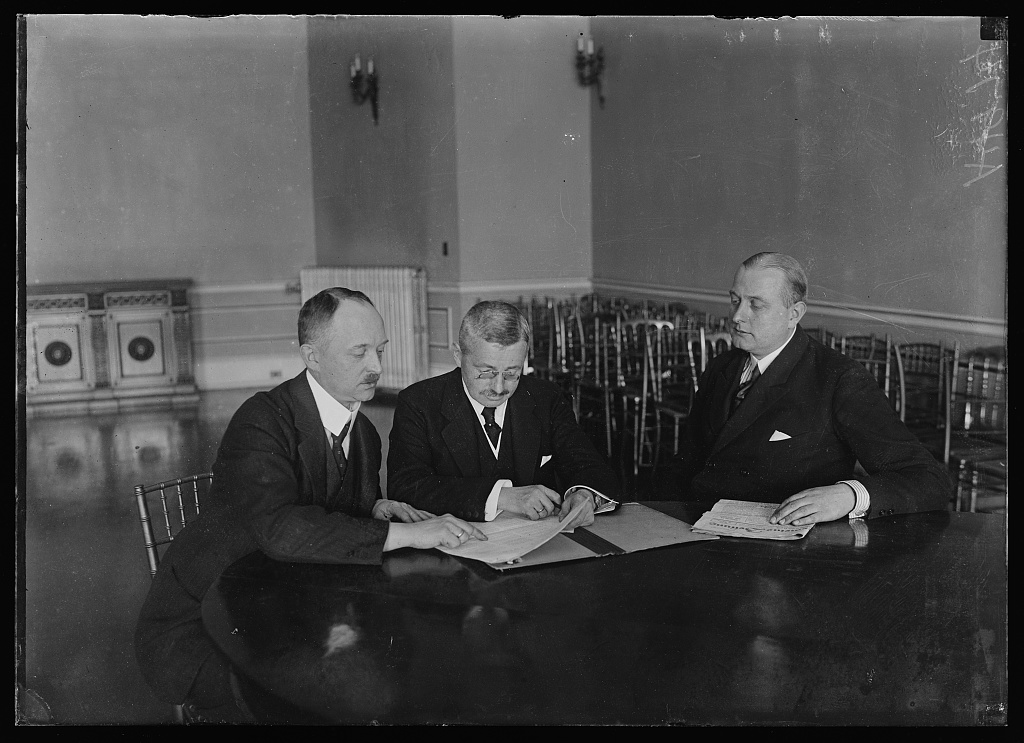
Karl von Lewinski, Privy Counselor; Dr. Wilhelm Kiesselbach, Special Emissary; and Dr. Otto Kiep, new Counselor of the Embassy, 1 January 1922

In 1912, he became an assistant judge at the Kammergericht, the Supreme Court in Prussia. In 1917, he became a legal advisor at the War Office, in 1918 at the Ministry of Justice, and, in 1920, at the Foreign Office (German: Auswärtiges Amt), where he aided in drafting the peace treaties between Germany and the other powers that ended World War I. Lewinski then helped draft the Weimar Constitution, which was the constitution that governed Germany during the Weimar Republic era.

Following the 1921 Treaty of Berlin, which officially ended the war between Germany and the United States, Lewinski represented the Reich in the reparations negotiations from 1922 to 1931 at the German-American Mixed Claims Commission in Washington, D.C. From 1925 to 1931, he succeeded Dr. Carl Lang to serve as German Consul General, First Class in New York. In 1928, von Lewinski and his wife gave a dinner at the Hotel Astor in honor of director Max Reinhardt. (Note: The guests at the dinner included the British Consul General, Sir Harry Gloster Amstrong and Lady Armstrong; the Italian Consul General, Commendatore Emanuele Grazzi, the Hungarian Consul General, Baron Ghika, the Consul General of Switzerland, Robert Schwarzenbach and Mrs. Schwarzenbach, U.S. Senator Robert F. Wagner, Mr. and Mrs. Grover Whalen, Mr. and Mrs. Edgar Speyer, Count and Countess Scherr-Thoss, Mrs. and Mrs. Max Stoehr, Count and Countess Luckner, Mr. and Mrs. Gilbert Miller, Mr. and Mrs. Morris Gest, and Mr. and Mrs. Victor Ridder.)

=== World War II and aftermath ===
After Adolf Hitler's rise to power, he withdrew from public service leaving the civil service in 1931 and settled in Berlin as a lawyer. For a short time he practiced together with Helmuth James von Moltke. In 1935, Lewinski represented defended naturalized American Richard Roiderer on charges of treason by the German government. In 1943, he was bombed out and moved to Dresden. After the war, he returned to Berlin and initially worked as a lawyer again. From August 1945 to January 1949, he was acting director of the Kaiser Wilhelm Institute for Foreign Public Law and International Law in Dahlem-Berlin, which had become part of the German Research University German: Deutschen Forschungshochschule) in 1947. This institute later became part of the Max Planck Institute for Comparative Public Law and International Law, founded by the Max Planck Society in Heidelberg in 1949.

In 1949, he moved to Washington, where he worked with the Office of Alien Property Custodian (within the U.S. Department of Justice) as an expert on international and private law issues at the request of the American government until his death in 1951.

== Personal life ==
While in the United States studying law, he married American Emma Louise Pomeroy (1883–1965) on 8 August 1909. They were the parents of a daughter, Inge (née von Lewinski) Wiedamann, and a son, R. Karl von Lewinski, who was murdered in Old Town Alexandria in 1984.

Lewinski died of a heart ailment on 29 October 1951 at his daughter's home 3308 Brown Street NW, Washington, D.C. He was buried at Rock Creek Cemetery there.

=== Honors ===
Lewinski was awarded an honorary Doctorate of Political Science by the Faculty of Economics at the University of Cologne in 1929 for his numerous publications, particularly in the field of American and international law, and his services to German-American relations.
