= Marihn =

- Ortsteil of Penzlin
- Interactive map of Marihn
- Location within Germany Location within Mecklenburg-Vorpommern
- Coordinates: 53°31′36″N 12°59′35″E
- Country: Germany
- State: Mecklenburg-Vorpommern
- District: Mecklenburgische Seenplatte
- Town: Penzlin

Area
  - Total: 7.86 km^{2} (3.03 sq mi)
- Elevation: 61 m (200 ft)

Population (2006-12-31)
  - Total: 260
  - Density: 33/km^{2} (86/sq mi)
- Time zone: UTC+01:00 (CET)
  - Summer (DST): UTC+02:00 (CEST)
- Postal codes: 17219
- Dialling codes: 03962
- Vehicle registration: MÜR
- Website: www.penzliner-land.de

Marihn is a village and a former municipality in the Mecklenburgische Seenplatte district, in Mecklenburg-Vorpommern, Germany. Since 7 June 2009, it is part of the town Penzlin.
