= Corps Borussia Bonn =

German student corps

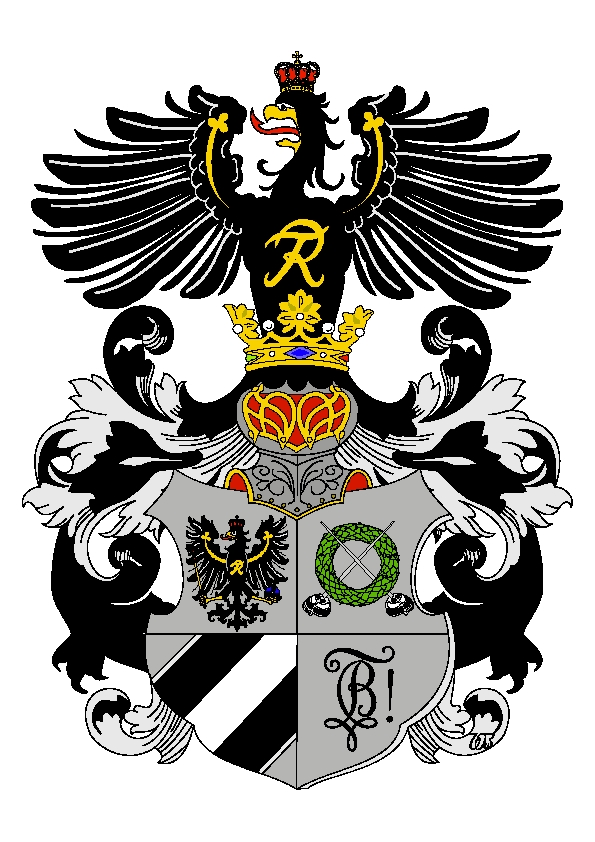
- Founded: December 22, 1821; 204 years ago University of Bonn
- Type: German Student Corps
- Affiliation: KSCV
- Status: Active
- Scope: Local
- Motto: Virtus fidesque bonorum corona "Bravery and loyalty are the crown of the good"
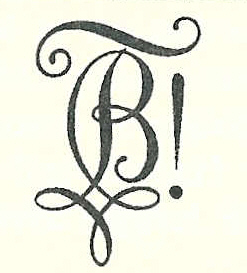
- Zirkel
- Chapters: 1
- Headquarters: Bonn; Germany

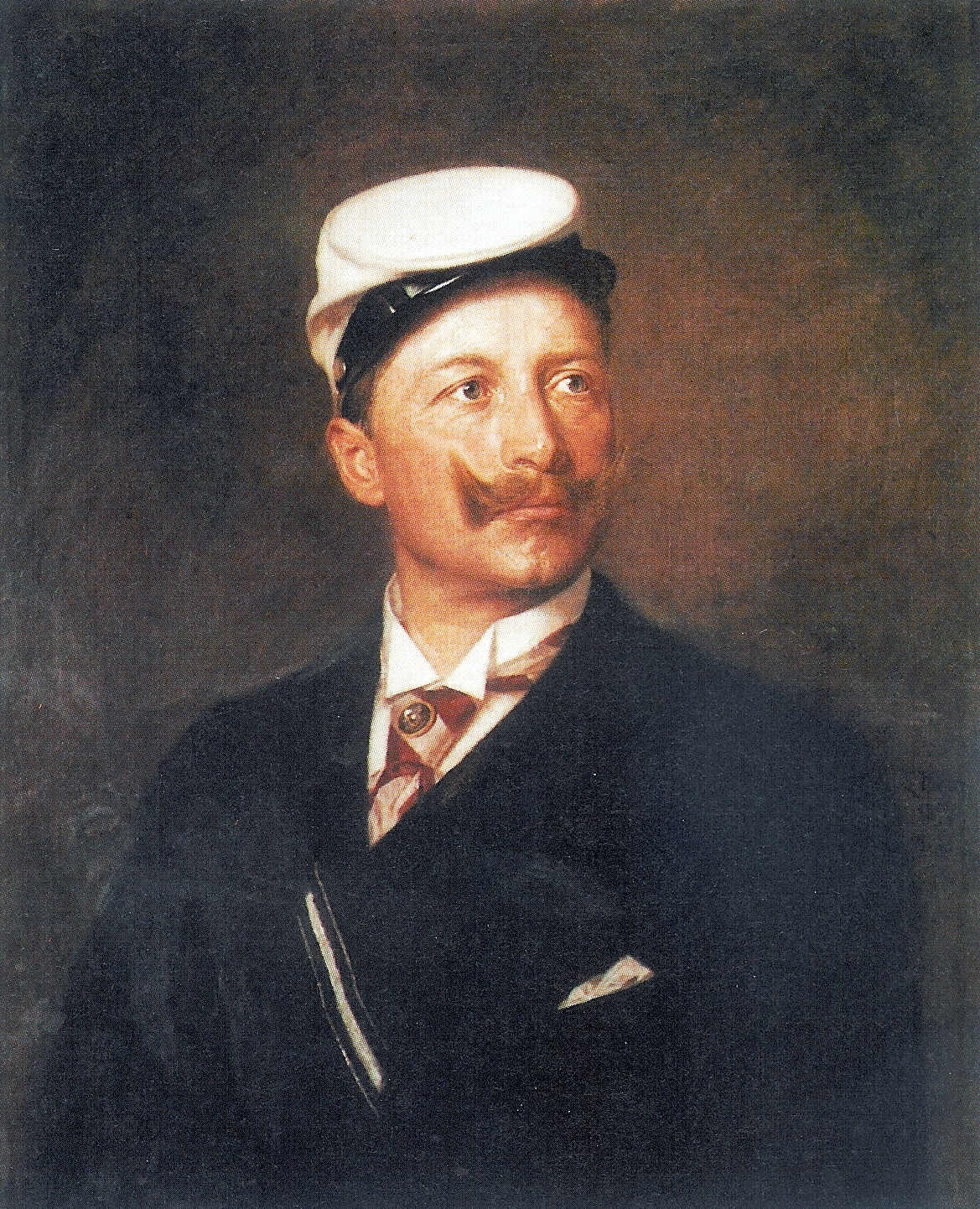
Wilhelm II, with student cap and ribbon of Corps Borussia Bonn

The Corps Borussia Bonn is a German Student Corps. It was established at the University of Bonn in Bonn, Germany in 1821. Inactive during the Nazi rule of Germany, the Corps was reestablished in 1949.

== History ==
The Corps Borussia Bonn was established on 22 December 1821 at the University of Bonn in Bonn, Germany. It is the corps of the House of Hohenzollern and Prussian nobility.

The Corps Borussia Bonn joined the Kösener Senioren-Convents-Verband (KSCV) in 1856. In 1864 and 1883, Borussia headed the KSCV. Notwithstanding some members of the Nazi Party, Corps Borussia refused to expel Jews and dissolved in 1935 while Germany was under Nazi rule.

The Corps Borussia Bonn reestablished itself in 1949, after the defeat of the Nazis in World War II.

== Symbols ==
The Corps Borussia Bonn's motto is Virtus fidesque bonorum corona (Latin for "Bravery and loyalty are the crown of the good").

== Notable members ==
Following are some of the notable members of the Corps Borussia Bonn.

=== Princes ===
- Alexis, Prince of Bentheim and Steinfurt
- Duke Paul Frederick of Mecklenburg
- Ernst II, Prince of Hohenlohe-Langenburg
- Frederick II, Grand Duke of Baden
- Frederick Francis IV
- Duke John Albert of Mecklenburg
- Wilhelm II, German Emperor
- Prince Eitel Friedrich of Prussia
- Prince Friedrich Karl of Prussia (1828–1885)
- Prince Friedrich Leopold of Prussia
- Prince Oskar of Prussia
- Wilhelm, German Crown Prince
- Prince Wilhelm of Prussia (1906–1940)
- Charles Edward, Duke of Saxe-Coburg and Gotha
- William Ernest, Grand Duke of Saxe-Weimar-Eisenach
- Prince Friedrich of Saxe-Meiningen
- Prince Adolf of Schaumburg-Lippe
- Ernst Gunther, Duke of Schleswig-Holstein
- Prince Bernhard of Lippe-Biesterfeld

=== Others ===
- Karl Hermann Bitter, writer
- Petre P. Carp, political scientist and culture critic
- Hermann Dohna-Finckenstein, politician
- Adolf Tortilowicz von Batocki-Friebe, politician
- Friedrich von Berg, politician
- Herbert von Bismarck, Foreign Secretary of Germany
- Johann von Dallwitz, politician
- Wilhelm von Gayl, jurist and politician
- Julius von Mirbach, politician
- Friedrich Wilhelm von Prittwitz und Gaffron, German ambassador
- Carl Friedrich von Pückler-Burghauss, German military officer and SS general
- Joseph Maria von Radowitz Jr., diplot
- Hans von Rosenberg, diplomat and politician
- Kurt Baron von Schröder, financier and politician
- Peter Yorck von Wartenburg, jurist
- Botho zu Eulenburg, minister-president of Prussia

== Scandals and member misconduct ==
Karl Marx fought a duel with a Corps Borrussia member in August 1836.

In November 1909, the corps was suspended for one semester for hazing and its members were prohibited from wearing its colours for three months. At the time, it was the primary fraternity of German royalty, including the Kaiser and all of the Hohenzollern princes.

== See also ==
- List of members of German student corps
- German nobility
- Kingdom of Prussia
