= Groß Flotow =

- Ortsteil of Penzlin
- Interactive map of Groß Flotow
- Location within Germany Location within Mecklenburg-Vorpommern
- Coordinates: 53°33′08″N 12°59′24″E
- Country: Germany
- State: Mecklenburg-Vorpommern
- District: Mecklenburgische Seenplatte
- Town: Penzlin

Area
  - Total: 14.53 km^{2} (5.61 sq mi)
- Elevation: 68 m (223 ft)

Population (2006-12-31)
  - Total: 158
  - Density: 10.9/km^{2} (28.2/sq mi)
- Time zone: UTC+01:00 (CET)
  - Summer (DST): UTC+02:00 (CEST)
- Postal codes: 17219
- Dialling codes: 039928
- Vehicle registration: MÜR
- Website: www.penzliner-land.de

Groß Flotow is a village and a former municipality in the Mecklenburgische Seenplatte district, in Mecklenburg-Vorpommern, Germany. Since 7 June 2009, it is part of the town Penzlin.

Groß Flotow likely originated as a Slavic settlement. The village is first mentioned in documents from 1418, although its Gothic church buildings date back to the 13th century. Most of the red brick houses were built in the thirties and fifties.

The incumbent district head of Groß Flotow is Ronny Wagenknecht.
