= Eduard von Lewinski =

German general (1829–1906)

- Born: 22 February 1829; Münster, Kingdom of Prussia
- Died: 17 September 1906 (aged 77); Burgwitz near Trebnitz
- Relatives: Erich von Manstein (son)
- Military career
- Allegiance: Prussia; German Empire
- Branch: Prussian Army; Imperial German Army
- Service years: 1846–1895
- Rank: General of the Artillery
- Commands: VI Corps
- Conflicts: Second Schleswig War; Austro-Prussian War; Franco-Prussian War
- Awards: Pour le Mérite

Eduard Julius Ludwig von Lewinski (22 February 1829 – 17 September 1906) was a Prussian general. His younger brother Alfred von Lewinski also became a Prussian general.

== Early life ==
Lewinski was born in Münster in the Province of Westphalia on 22 February 1829 in the Lewinski family. He was a son of Lt.-Col. August Jakob von Lewinski and Charlotte Wilhelmine (née Seydel).

== Career ==
He served in the 1864 Second Schleswig War as captain of the 1st Guards Fortress Company, and received the prestigious Pour le Mérite. In the Austro-Prussian War he was assigned to the 1st Division as a staff officer. In 1867, Lewinski was promoted to major on the general staff. He later served in the Franco-Prussian War, first on the staff of the 1st Division and later as Quartermaster-General of the South Army. In 1871, he became chief of staff of the IX Corps. In 1872, he was promoted to lieutenant colonel and assumed command of the 24th Artillery Regiment.

In 1877, he was made Commander of the 2nd Field artillery brigade, followed by promotion to major general in 1880. In 1884, he was named Inspector-General of the 2nd Field Artillery Inspection and promoted to lieutenant general in 1885. In 1889, he was appointed Commanding General of the VI Corps and promoted to General of the Artillery in 1890.

Lewinski retired from the army in 1895.

== Personal life ==
Lewinski and his wife, Helene Pauline von Sperling, were the biological parents of future Field Marshal Erich von Manstein (1887–1973), who was adopted at birth by childless relatives General Georg von Manstein and Hedwig von Sperling, sister to Helene. A third von Sperling daughter, Gertrud, was married to Paul von Hindenburg.

Lewinski died in Burgwitz, Trebnitz on 17 September 1906.

== Honours and awards ==
- Kingdom of Prussia:
  - Pour le Mérite (military), 7 June 1864; with Oak Leaves, 3 March 1871
  - Knight of the Order of the Red Eagle, 4th Class with Swords, 1866; 2nd Class with Oak Leaves and Swords on Ring, 18 January 1883; 1st Class, 20 September 1890
  - Iron Cross (1870), 1st Class
  - Knight of the Royal Order of the Crown, 2nd Class, 16 September 1879
- Sweden-Norway: Commander Grand Cross of the Order of the Sword, 8 September 1888
