= Julius P. Meyer =

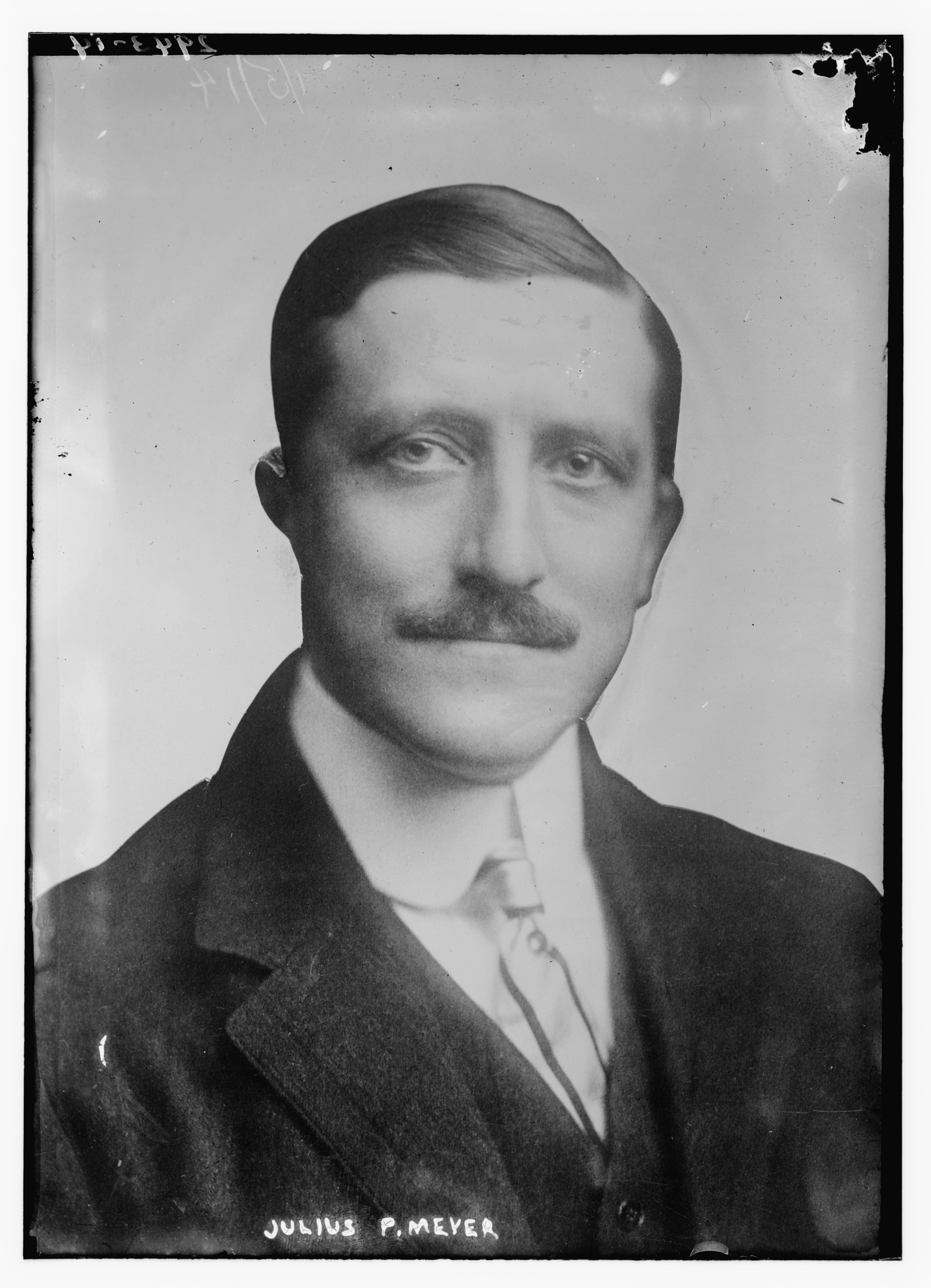
Julius P. Meyer, 1910

Julius Paul Meyer (November 1, 1871 – July 9, 1945) was a German-American shipping executive.

== Early life ==
Meyer was born on November 1, 1871, in Hoboken, New Jersey. He was a son of Mathilde (née Teubner) Meyer (1845–1910) and Jurgen Friedrich Heinrich Meyer (1838–1913), the representative of the Hamburg Line for almost half a century who was known as "Steamer Meyer". Among his siblings were sister, Gertrude, and brothers, Carl Gerhard Meyer, Jergen Arnold Meyer, Rudolph Meyer, Otto Meyer.

== Career ==
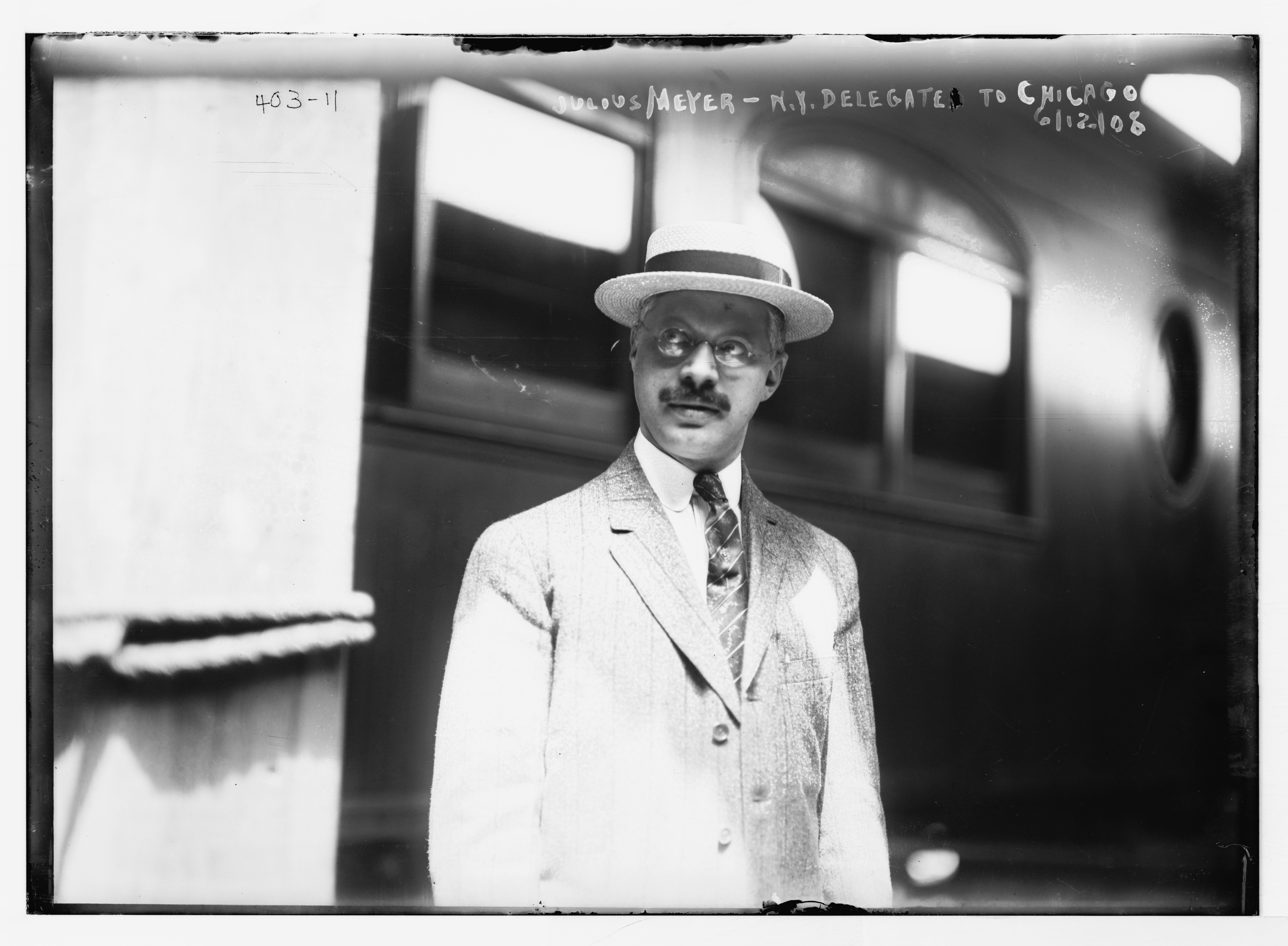
Meyer, as a New York delegate to Chicago

After attending Hoboken Academy, Meyer began his career in 1888 as an employee of Kunhardt & Co. before becoming general agent of the line, then vice director in 1912. When the United American Line was taken over Hamburg America Line, he became Director-General. In this capacity, he reestablished connections with Germany after World War I. After forty-two years with the line, he retired in 1931.

Meyer served as president of the Board of Trade for German-American Commerce. He was a member of German Society in New York, founded in 1784, and was chairman of its anniversary committee in 1934.

He was also involved in Republican politics, supporting Charles Evans Hughes for Governor of New York in 1908 and attending the 1908 Republican National Convention in Chicago as a delegate. President Theodore Roosevelt took the Hamburg America Line steamship Winduk from Naples, Italy, to Mombasa, Kenya, during his African safari and Meyer corresponded with Roosevelt's Executive Clerk, Rudolph Forster. In 1927, he attended the funeral of Ambassador Adolf Georg von Maltzan.

== Personal life ==
Meyer and his wife, Wilhelmina, lived at 755 Park Avenue in Manhattan. After a seven-week illness, Meyer died at the French Hospital in New York on July 9, 1945.

=== Honors ===
In 1914, he was awarded a Knight 2nd Class of the Order of the Red Eagle by Kaiser Wilhelm II.
