= Friedrich von Berg =

German lawyer and politician (1866–1939)

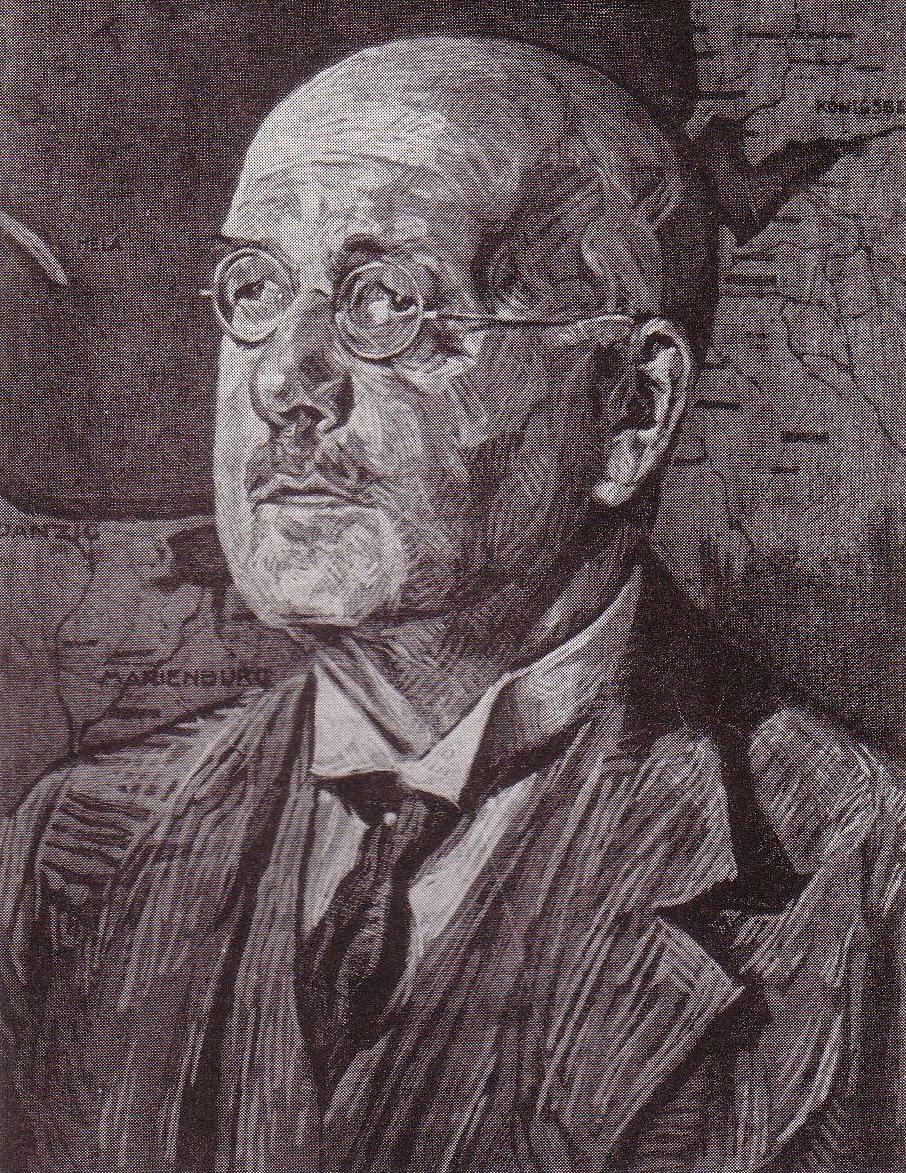
- Friedrich von Berg
- Born: 20 November 1866; Markienen, Prussia
- Died: 9 March 1939 (aged 72); Markienen, East Prussia, Germany
- Other name: Friedrich von Berg-Markienen
- Occupations: Lawyer; Politician

Friedrich Wilhelm Bernhard von Berg (20 November 1866 – 9 March 1939), also known as von Berg-Markienen, was a German politician and chairman of the Secret Civil Cabinet of Kaiser Wilhelm II in 1918.

== Biography ==
Friedrich von Berg was born on his family's estate of Markienen (today Markiny, Poland) to the Prussian Major Friedrich von Berg (1835–1888). After passing his Abitur, Berg joined the Prussian Army in 1885 and became the personal adjutant of Prince Friedrich Leopold of Prussia in 1888. He left the service in 1892 and started to study law at the Universities of Breslau and Bonn, where he became a member of the Corps Borussia Bonn next to the later Kaiser Wilhelm II. After passing his law exams, Berg worked at the local court of Bartenstein and, in 1896, at Danzig. In 1899, he moved to Berlin, where he became an Assessor. In 1903, he returned to East Prussia and worked as the head of the district administration (Landrat) of the Goldap district.

In 1906, he became a member of the Geheimes Zivilkabinett (Secret Civil Cabinet), the Kaiser's personal office. In 1909, he became the Landeshauptmann of East Prussia and, in 1916, he was promoted to Oberpräsident of the Province of East Prussia. On 16 January 1918, Berg became the chairman of the Kaiser's office. He opposed peace negotiations to end World War I as proposed by Chancellor Max von Baden and had to resign on 11 October 1918.

Berg returned to his estate in East Prussia, where he was the president of the provincial parliament (Provinziallandtag) in 1919 and the old-Prussian East Prussian Provincial Synod in 1920. The same year, he became the chairman of the German Nobility Association (Deutsche Adelsgenossenschaft), a post which he retained until 1932.

From 1921 to 1927, Berg was the chief representative of the House of Hohenzollern in their negotiations over the family's personal property with the government of the Weimar Republic (Cf. Expropriation of the Princes in the Weimar Republic).

Berg died in 1939 on his estate of Markienen.
