= List of ambassadors of Germany to the United States =

Ambassador of Germany to the United States
- Deutscher Botschafter in den Vereinigten Staaten
- Incumbent; Jens Hanefeld since September 2025
- Residence: Washington, D.C.
- Inaugural holder: Kurd von Schlözer
- Formation: 1871

Germany and the United States have had diplomatic relations since German unification in 1871. Prior to that, the only German states holding diplomatic relations with the U.S. were the Kingdom of Prussia, since 1835, and the three Hanseatic cities of Bremen, Hamburg, and Lübeck, since 1853.

Relations were broken twice (1917 to 1921, 1941 to 1955) while Germany and the United States were at war.

== Envoys and ministers of German states ==
=== Ministers of Prussia to the United States ===
- 1817–1823: Friedrich von Greuhm
- 1825–1830: Ludwig Niederstetter; Chargé d'Affaires
- 1834–1844: Friedrich Ludwig von Rönne
- 1844–1848: Friedrich von Gerolt
- 1848–1849: Friedrich Ludwig von Rönne (October 1848 – December 1849; (January 26 – December 21, 1849) simultaneously "Envoy Extraordinary and Minister Plenipotentiary for the Central Government of Germany" i.e., the Frankfurt Parliament)
- 1849–1868: Friedrich von Gerolt (January 24, 1868 – 1871 as Minister of the North German Confederation)

=== Ministers of the Hanseatic cities to the United States ===
- 1827–1828: Vincent Rumpff
- 1862–1864: Rudolf Schleiden
- 1864–1868: Johannes Rösing

== Heads of mission ==
=== Ministers and Ambassadors of the German Empire to the U.S. ===
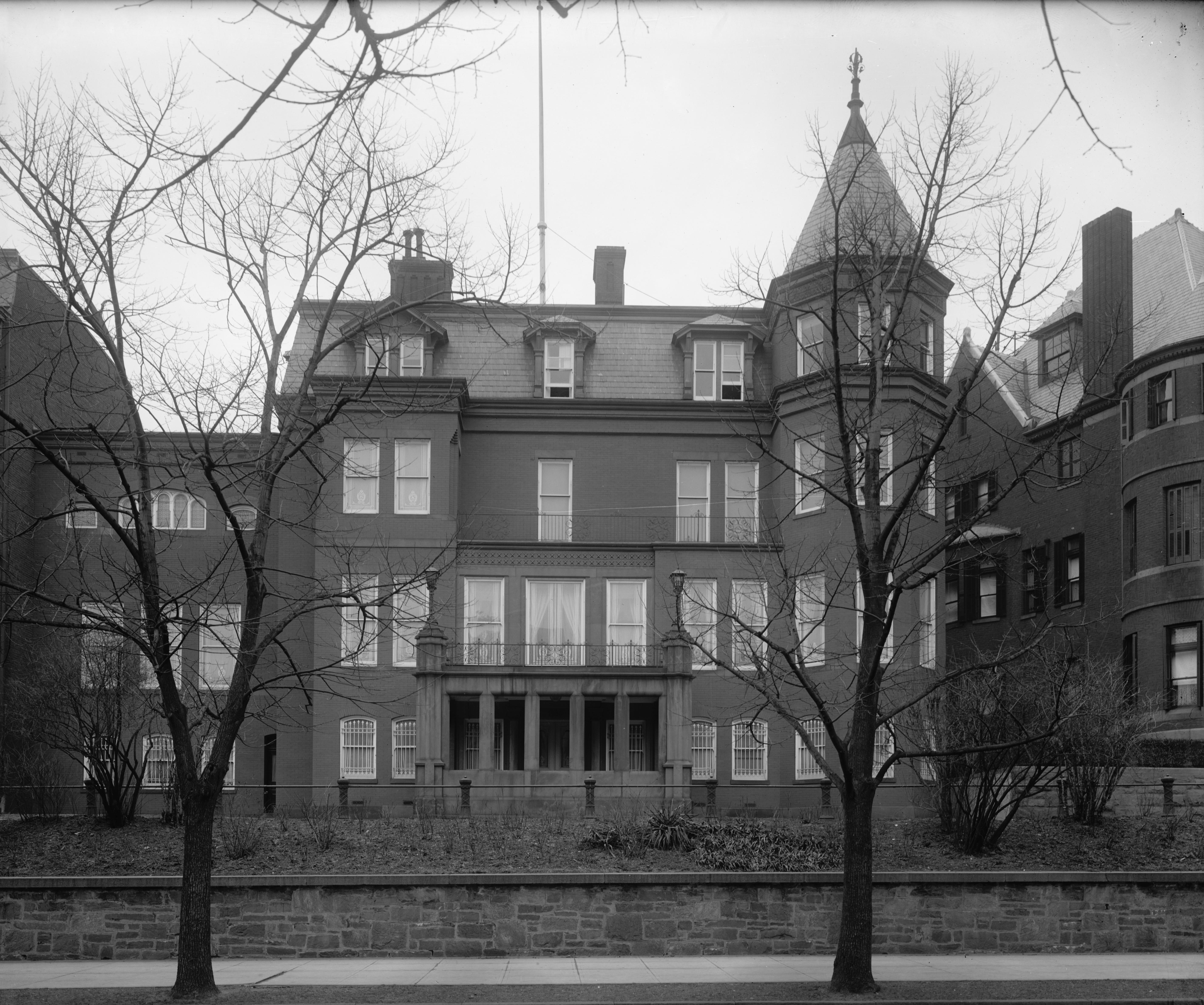
German Embassy in 1917

- 1871–1882: Kurd von Schlözer, Minister Plenipotentiary
- 1882–1884: Carl von Eisendecher, Minister Plenipotentiary
- 1884–1888: Friedrich Johann Graf von Alvensleben, Minister Plenipotentiary
- 1888–1891: Ludwig, Graf von Arco-Valley, Minister Plenipotentiary
- 1891–1893: Theodor von Holleben, Minister Plenipotentiary
- 1893–1895: Anton Saurma von der Jeltsch
- 1895–1897: Max von Thielmann
- 1897–1903: Theodor von Holleben
- 1903–1908: Hermann Freiherr Speck von Sternburg
- 1908–1917: Johann Heinrich von Bernstorff

Diplomatic relations broken off due to World War I (February 3, 1917 – April 25, 1921)

=== Ambassadors of the Weimar Republic to the U.S. ===
- 1921–1922: Karl Lang, Chargé d'Affaires
- 1922–1925: Otto Wiedfeldt
- 1925–1927: Adolf Georg von Maltzan

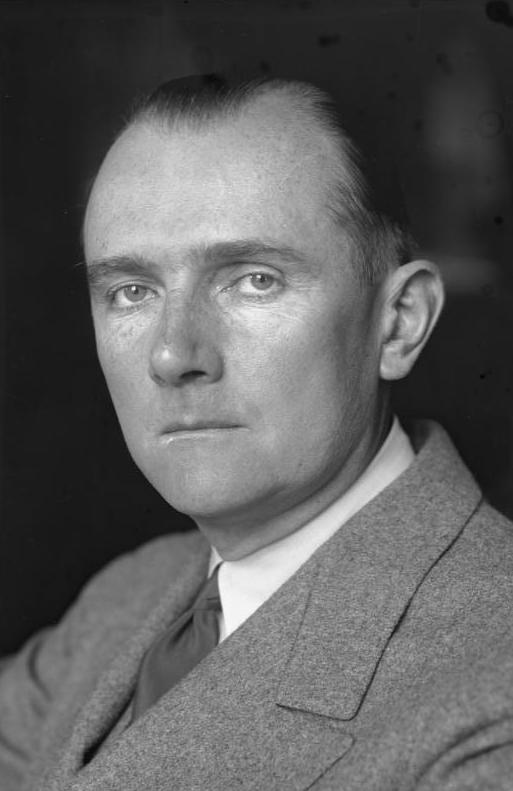
Friedrich Wilhelm von Prittwitz und Gaffron

- 1928–1933: Friedrich Wilhelm von Prittwitz und Gaffron (resigned April 14, 1933 in opposition to Hitler).

=== Ambassadors of the Third Reich to the U.S. ===
- 1933–1937: Hans Luther
- 1937–1938: Hans-Heinrich Dieckhoff, recalled November 18, 1938 in response to worsening relations with the U.S. due to Kristallnacht (November 9), and the U.S. recall of its Ambassador (November 15).
- 1938–1941: Hans Thomsen, Chargé d'Affaires

Diplomatic relations broken off due to World War II (December 11, 1941 – September 22, 1949)

=== Ambassadors of the Federal Republic of Germany to the U.S. ===
- 1951–1958: Heinrich Krekeler (20 July 1906 – 5 August 2003), (June 1950 – June 1951: Consul General, June 1951 – May 1955: Chargé d'Affaires, May 1955 – January 1958: Ambassador)
- 1958–1962: Wilhelm Grewe (16 October 1911 – 11 January 2000) (February 1958 – May 1962)
- 1962–1968: Karl Heinrich Knappstein (15 April 1906 – 6 May 1989) (June 1962 – December 1968)
- 1968–1973: Rolf Friedemann Pauls (26 August 1915 – 4 May 2002) (December 1968 – February 1973)
- 1973–1979: Berndt von Staden (24 June 1919 – 17 October 2014) (February 1973 – November 1979)
- 1979–1984: Peter Hermes (8 August 1922 – 14 October 2015) (November 1979 – July 1984)
- 1984–1987: Günther van Well (15 October 1922 – 14 August 1993) (July 1984 – October 1987)
- 1987–1992: Jürgen Ruhfus (4 August 1930 – 25 February 2018) (November 1987 – August 1992)
- 1992–1995: Immo Stabreit (24 January 1933 – 1 November 2025) (August 1992 – January 1995)
- 1995–2001: Jürgen Chrobog (28 February 1940 – 16 November 2026) (January 1995 – June 2001)
- 2001–2006: Wolfgang Ischinger (6 April 1946 – ) (June 2001 – March 2006)
- 2006–2011: Klaus Scharioth (8 October 1946 – 30 October 2025) (March 2006 – 2011)
- 2011–2014: Peter Ammon (23 February 1952 – ) (August 2011 – April 2014)
- 2014–2018: Peter Wittig (11 August 1954 – ) (April 2014 – June 2018)
- 2018–2023: Emily Haber (1956 – ) (June 2018 – June 2023)
- 2023–2025: Andreas Michaelis (1959 – ) (August 2023 - July 2025)
- Since 2025: Jens Hanefeld (Since September 2025)

== See also ==
- Embassy of Germany, Washington, D.C.
- List of ambassadors of the United States to Germany
