= Wolfgang Ischinger =

German diplomat

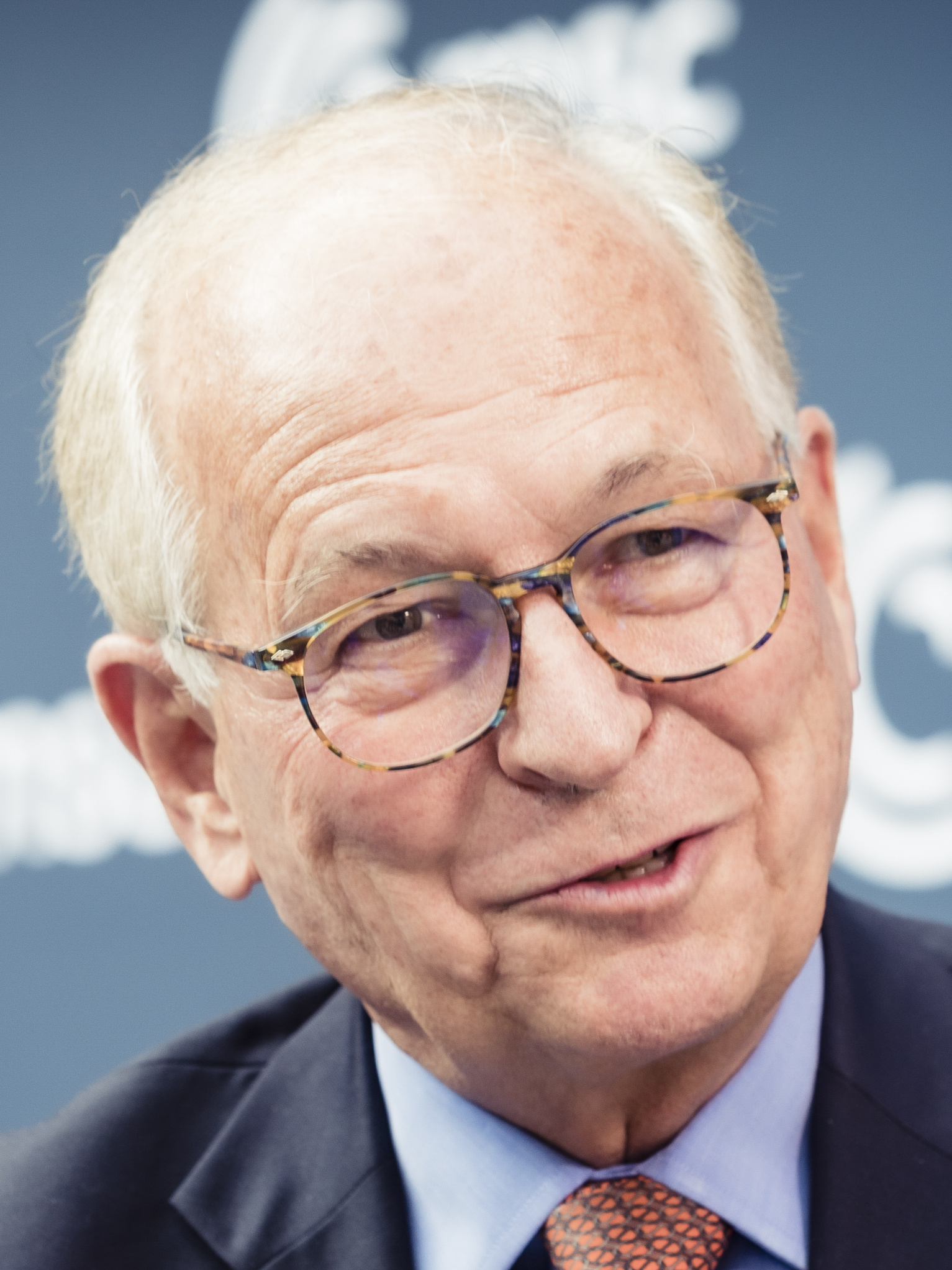
- Ischinger in 2020

Chair of the Munich Security Conference
- In office 2008–2022
- Preceded by: Horst Teltschik
- Succeeded by: Christoph Heusgen

German Ambassador to the Court of St. James's
- In office March 2006 – June 2008
- President: Horst Köhler
- Preceded by: Thomas Matussek
- Succeeded by: Georg Boomgaarden

German Ambassador to the United States
- In office June 2001 – March 2006
- President: Johannes Rau; Horst Köhler
- Preceded by: Jürgen Chrobog
- Succeeded by: Klaus Scharioth

Personal details
- Born: Wolfgang Friedrich Ischinger; April 6, 1946 (age 80) Beuren, Esslingen, Germany
- Spouse: Jutta Falke-Ischinger
- Children: 3
- Education: University of Bonn, University of Geneva, The Fletcher School of Law and Diplomacy

Wolfgang Friedrich Ischinger (born April 6, 1946) is a German diplomat who serves as chairman of the Munich Security Conference.

From 2001 to 2006, Ischinger was the German ambassador to the United States, and from 1998 to 2001, he was Staatssekretär (Deputy Foreign Minister) in Berlin. He was Germany's ambassador to the Court of St. James's (the United Kingdom) from 2006 to May, 2008. He was also Global Head of Government Relations of Allianz SE from March 2008 until December 2014. He serves on the supervisory board of Allianz Deutschland AG, on the European Advisory Board of Investcorp (London/New York) and on the governing board of the Stockholm International Peace Research Institute. He has been described as "Germany's best-connected former diplomat".

== Early life and education ==
Ischinger was born in Beuren, Baden-Württemberg, near Stuttgart, Germany. In 1963–64, he was an American Field Service foreign exchange student in Watseka, Illinois, where he graduated from the local high school in June 1964. After receiving his Abitur in Germany, Ischinger studied law at the University of Bonn, Germany and the University of Geneva, Switzerland and obtained his law degree in 1972. He earned a master's degree from the Fletcher School of Law and Diplomacy in Medford, Massachusetts, in 1973.

== Diplomatic career ==
From 1973 to 1975, Ischinger served on the staff of the Secretary General of the United Nations in New York. He joined the German Foreign Service in 1975, and has served in Washington, D.C., Paris, and in a number of senior functions in the German Foreign Office. In 1982, he became personal assistant to Hans-Dietrich Genscher, West German foreign minister and leader of the Free Democratic Party.

From 1993 to 1995, Ischinger was director of the Policy Planning Staff under Foreign Minister Klaus Kinkel; from 1995 to 1998, as director general for political affairs (political director), Ischinger participated in a number of international negotiating processes, including the Bosnia Peace Talks at Dayton, Ohio, the negotiations concerning the NATO-Russia Founding Act, as well as the negotiations on EU and NATO enlargement and on the Kosovo crisis.

As Staatssekretär (deputy foreign minister) under Foreign Minister Joschka Fischer between 1998 and 2001, Ischinger represented Germany at numerous international and European conferences, including the 1999 G8 and EU summit meetings in Cologne and the 2000 Review Conference of the Treaty on the Non-Proliferation of Nuclear Weapons (NPT) at the United Nations in New York.

In 2007, Ischinger was the European Union Representative in the Troika negotiations on the future of Kosovo, which ended up leading to the declaration of independence of Kosovo and the recognition of Kosovo by most EU member countries, the United States, and a number of other countries, in February 2008. Reportedly, Ischinger entered the talks "with only one goal and idea: for Kosovo to become independent in the end, with the Serbian authority's willing consent".

== Later career ==
From 2019 until 2020, Ischinger co-chaired the Transatlantic Task Force of the German Marshall Fund and the Bundeskanzler-Helmut-Schmidt-Stiftung (BKHS), alongside Karen Donfried.

Ischinger has published widely on foreign policy, security, and arms control policy as well as on European and transatlantic issues.

== Other activities ==
=== Corporate boards ===
- Investcorp, member of the international advisory board
- Kekst CNC, Member of the Global Advisory Board

=== Non-profit organizations ===
- American Academy in Berlin, member of the board of trustees
- American Institute for Contemporary Germany Studies, member of the board of trustees
- AFS Germany (American Field Service), member of the board
- Atlantic Council of the United States, member of the board
- Atlantik-Brücke, member of the board
- Bonner Akademie für Forschung und Lehre praktischer Politik (BAPP), member of the board of trustees
- Bundesakademie für Sicherheitspolitik (BAKS), member of the board
- Club of Three, member of the steering group
- Council on Public Policy Berlin, member of the board
- Dahrendorf Forum, Member of the Committee
- EastWest Institute, member of the board
- Fletcher School of Law and Diplomacy, board of overseers
- German Institute for International and Security Affairs (SWP), member of the council
- German-Polish-Ukrainian Society (GPUS), member of the advisory board
- Global Bridges, member of the board
- Global Zero Commission, Member
- Stockholm International Peace Research Institute (SIPRI), member of the governing board
- Turkey: Culture of Change Initiative (TCCI), member of the advisory board
- Walther Rathenau Institute, member of the advisory board
- World Economic Forum (WEF), member of the Global Future Council on the Future of International Security
- International Crisis Group (ICG), member of the board of trustees (-2018)

Since 2011, Ischinger also acts as advisor to Fair Observer on global politics and security topics.

== Recognition ==
- 2018 – Nunn-Lugar Award for Promoting Nuclear Security
- 2016 – Order of the Rising Sun, 2nd class
- 2010 – Order of Merit of Baden-Württemberg
- 2009 – Order of Merit of the Federal Republic of Germany
- 2008 – Leo Baeck Medal (Leo Baeck Institute) for humanitarian work promoting tolerance and social justice (awarded by James D. Wolfensohn and Ambassador Richard C. Holbrooke)

== Personal life ==
Ischinger is married to Jutta Falke, a journalist and writer, and the couple have one child. Ischinger also has two children from a previous marriage with Barbara Ischinger (born 1949). Before departing from Berlin to Washington, D.C., in 2001, Jutta Falke-Ischinger was the Berlin bureau chief of the German weekly "Rheinischer Merkur".
