= Günther van Well =

German diplomat

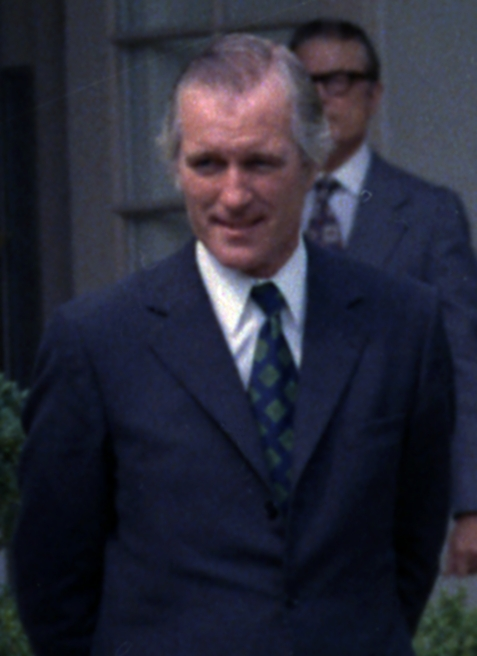

West German Ambassador to the United States
- In office July 1984 – October 1987
- President: Richard von Weizsäcker
- Preceded by: Peter Hermes
- Succeeded by: Jürgen Ruhfus

West German Ambassador to the United Nations
- In office 1981–1984
- President: Karl Carstens
- Preceded by: Rüdiger von Wechmar
- Succeeded by: Hans Werner Lautenschlager

Personal details
- Born: 15 October 1922 Osterath, Germany
- Died: 14 August 1993 (aged 70) Bonn, Germany
- Spouse: Carolyn Bradley (m. 1957)
- Education: University of Bonn
- Awards: Officer's Cross of the Order of Merit (1973)
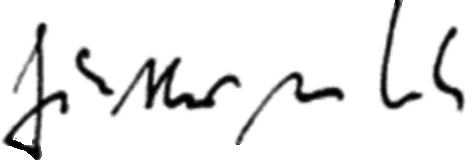
- Signature

Military service
- Allegiance: Germany
- Branch/service: Luftwaffe
- Years of service: 1941–1945
- Unit: Parachute corps
- Battles/wars: World War II

Günther Wilhelm van Well (15 October 1922 – 14 August 1993) was a German diplomat, Secretary of State from 1977 to 1981, and West German Ambassador to the United States from 1984 to 1987.

== Career ==
In the early seventies, as Assistant Secretary and Assistant Secretary in the Foreign Office, he was in the development of rapprochement with the GDR, as well as the four-power agreement. As Acting Secretary of State, he was appointed by then-foreign minister Hans-Dietrich Genscher, as his personal representative for disaster prevention.

Following his work as secretary of state, he was Ambassador and Permanent Representative of the Federal Republic of Germany to the United Nations. After that, he served as German ambassador in Washington, DC.

As a retired ambassador, he engaged as a participant in the "Bergedorf Round Table" of the Körber Foundation, among many other celebrities for an understanding of international problems and issues, as well as Executive Vice President of the German Council on Foreign Relations, Bonn.

== Publications ==
- "Die Entwicklung der gemeinsamen Nahostpolitik der Neun", in: Europa Archiv, 4/1976;
- "Teilnahme Berlins am internationalen Geschehen – ein dringender Punkt auf der Ost-West- Tagesordnung", in: Europa Archiv, 20/1976;
- "Belgrad 1977. Das KSZE-Folgetreffen und seine Bedeutung für den Entspannungsprozeß", in: Europa Archiv, 18/1977;
- "Politische Aspekte des Strukturwandels der Weltwirtschaft", in: Europa Archiv, 3/1979;
- "Wandel in Europa und die beiden deutschen Staaten", in: Europa-Archiv; 19/1989, S. 569–576;
- Auf der Suche nach der Gestalt Europas. Festschrift für Wolfgang Wagner zum 65. Geburtstag am 23. August 1990 (Mitherausgeber Jochen Thies);
- "Deutschland und die UN", in: Rüdiger Wolfrum (Hrsg.), Handbuch Vereinte Nationen, München 1991², S. 71 – 77;
- "Der Auswärtige Dienst in einer Zeit des Wandels", in: Europa Archiv, 10/1992, S. 269–278 und 14/1992, S. 391–396;
- "Die Vereinten Nationen als Friedensstifter: Möglichkeiten und Grenzen der Weltorganisation", in: Die Vereinten Nationen und Österreich, 1/1993, 7 – 11.
