= Otto Wiedfeldt =

German industrialist, statistician, politician and diplomat

His Excellency Otto Wiedfeldt
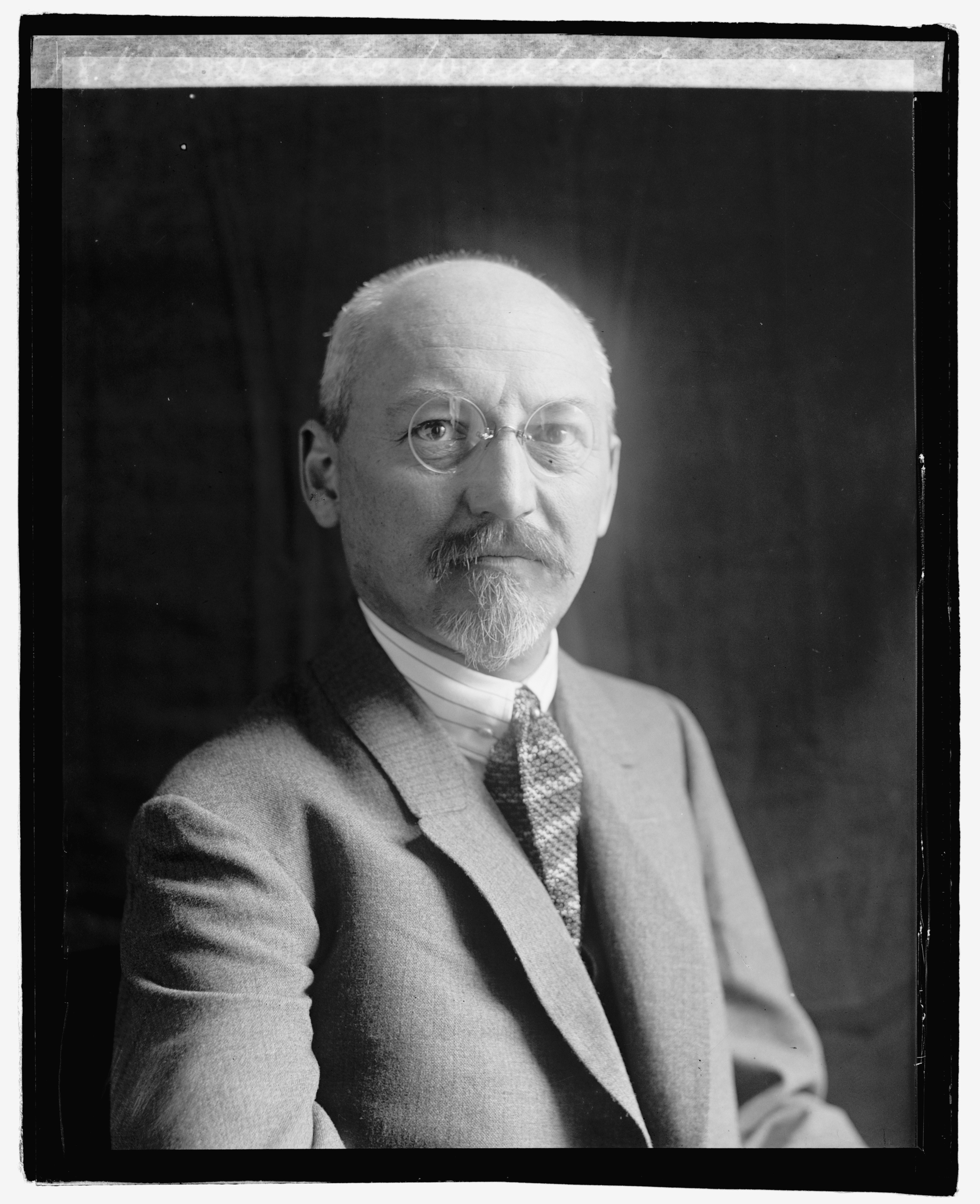
- Dr. Otto Wiedfeldt, 1922

German Ambassador to the United States
- In office 1922–1925
- Preceded by: Karl Lang (as Chargé d'Affaires)
- Succeeded by: Adolf Georg von Maltzan

Personal details
- Born: Otto Karl Ludwig Wiedfeldt; 16 August 1871 Badel, Altmark, Germany
- Died: 5 July 1926 (aged 54) Essen, Germany
- Spouse: Anna Bley (m. 1896; died 1926)
- Children: Hermann Joachim Wiedfeldt
- Parent(s): Auguste Friederike Bley; Karl Otto Wiedfeldt
- Education: University of Leipzig

Otto Karl Ludwig Wiedfeldt (16 August 1871 – 5 July 1926) was a German industrialist, statistician, politician and diplomat.

== Early life ==
Wiedfeldt was born on 16 August 1871 in Thüritz (today known as Badel) in Altmark, Germany. He was the son of Auguste Friederike (née Bley) Wiedfeldt and Karl Otto Wiedfeldt (1841–1915), a successful manufacturer. He was educated at the Gymnasium in Bernburg and Salzwedel before studying economics in Berlin (at the Studium der Nationalökonomie), later receiving his doctorate from the University of Leipzig.

== Career ==
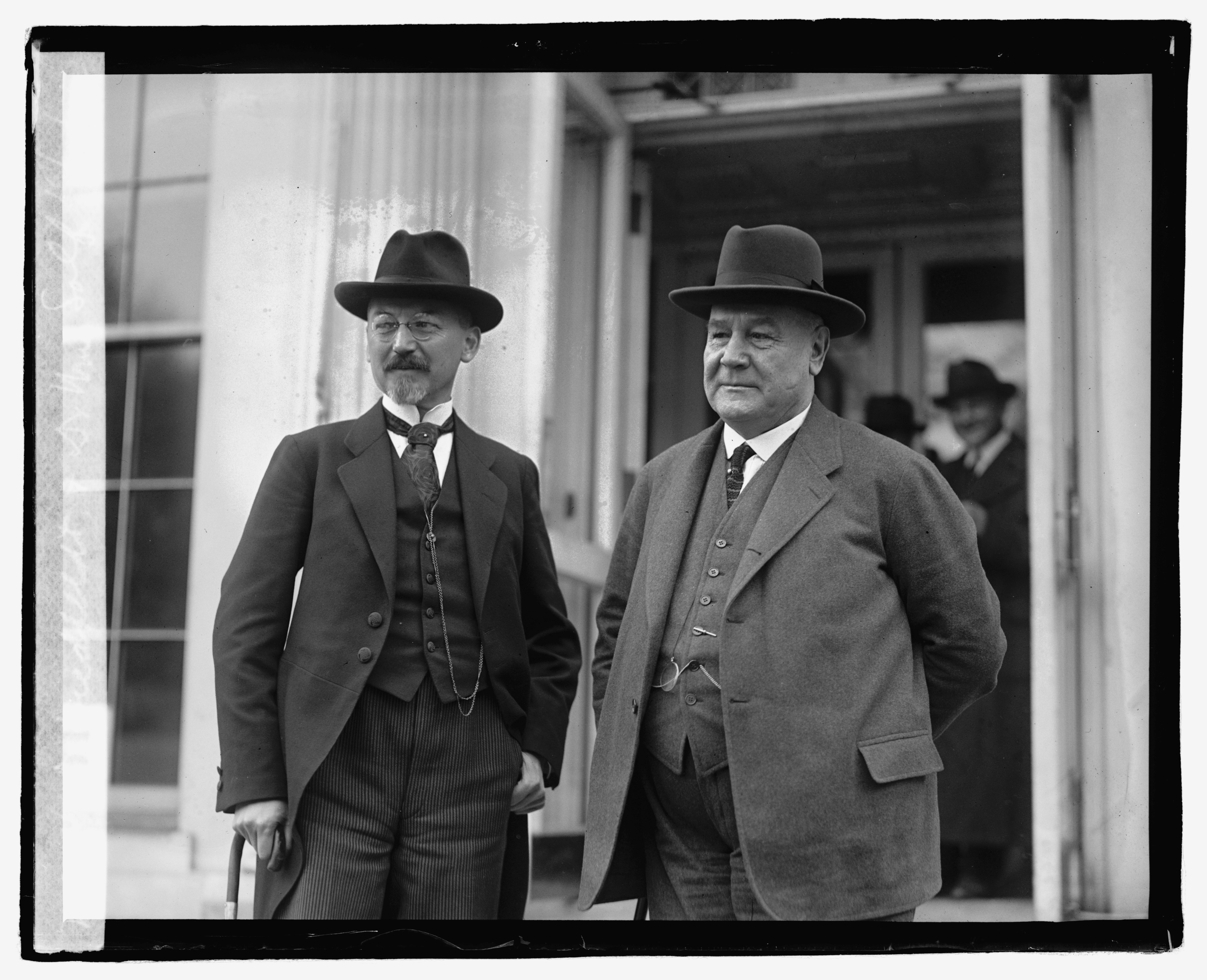
Dr. Wiedfeldt and Dr. Wilhelm Solf, the German ambassador to Japan, 1922

After graduation from university, Wiedfeldt was employed by the Statistical Office of the Ministry of the Interior. He later went to Japan as a representative of large German firms and acted as a commercial advisor to the Japanese Government. He served as a member of the Administrative Board of Essen for many years. In 1908, he was appointed to a post within the Ministry of the Interior, and was responsible for drafting the 1911 Reich social insurance code (German: Reichsversicherungsordnung).

From 1911 to 1914 he served as manager of the South Manchurian Railroad Company. After returning from Japan in 1914, he spent several months in the United States, learning about American manufacturing methods. At the beginning of World War I in July 1914, he joined the Reich's Wirtschafts Amt. where he became head of the Imperial Grain Office (German: Reichsgetreidestelle), developing a bread rationing program.

In 1918, following the end of the War, he was appointed director of Krupp's, tasked with transforming the company's Essen works from a weapons manufacturer to peace time production. Wiedfeldt, a vocal opponent of reparations, served in this role until he was appointed to be the German Ambassador to the United States.

=== Ambassador to the United States ===
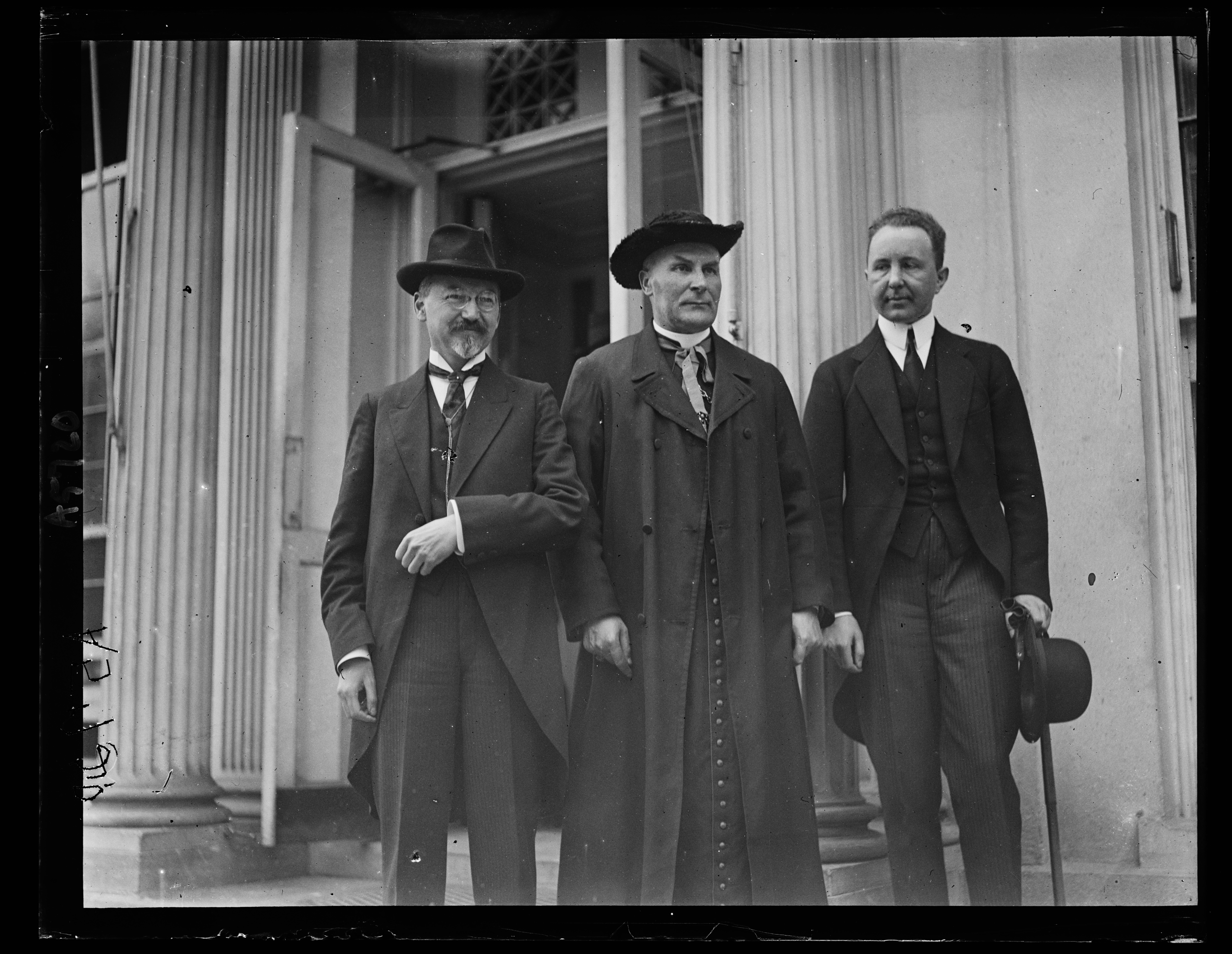
Dr. Otto Weidfeldt, Cardinal Michael von Faulhaber, and Dr. H.H. Dieckhoff, 1923

Upon America's entry into World War I in April 1917, U.S. President Woodrow Wilson immediately severed diplomatic relations with Germany and the country returned Ambassador Count Johann Heinrich von Bernstorff's passports. Following the end of the War, full diplomatic relations weren't restored until Wiedfeldt was installed as the new German Ambassador to the United States, presenting his letters of credence to President Warren G. Harding in May 1922. In his presentation, Wiedfeldt referred to himself as the Ambassador of the German Empire while Harding referred to Germany as the Republic of Germany. While Ambassador, he negotiated a trade treaty between Germany and the United States. In August 1923, he inspected the Albert Ballin, which was Germany's largest merchant marine ship, before it sailed to Hamburg from New York.

During his tenure as ambassador, the Foreign Office had to deny his resignation several times, including in December 1923, (Note: In December 1923, Baroness de Cartier de Marchienne (née Marie E. Dow), the American-born wife of Baron Emile de Cartier de Marchienne, the Belgian Ambassador to the United States, refused to be seated next to Dr. Otto Wiedfeldt at a diplomatic dinner given by the President and Mrs. Coolidge at the White House.) and February 1924 following his decision to leave the flag at the German Embassy at full-mast, rather than lowering it to half-mast upon the death of former President Wilson. Criticism of his decision led to further speculation of his recall before the announcement in August 1924 that he would officially retire on September 15, 1924. (Note: Reportedly, he asked Wilhelmstrasse (the Foreign Office) what observance the German Embassy should follow upon former President Woodrow Wilson's death in February 1924. Without specific guidance from Berlin (as they felt Wilson was, by then, only a private citizen), Wiedfeldt, in a "strictly personal capacity", decided to only fly the flag at half-mast during his funeral. This decision was felt by many to be disrespectful.) Nevertheless, his retirement was postponed and he stayed in his post, reportedly at the request of the German government until after the 1924 presidential election in America.

=== Later life ===
On January 31, 1925, he left his post, handing over leadership of the embassy to Counsellor Hans-Heinrich Dieckhoff, before he was officially succeeded by Baron Adolf Georg von Maltzan in February. As was often speculated, following his retirement from the diplomatic service, he returned to Krupp's to help modernize the company, especially related to implementation of the Dawes Plan. He left the company for health reasons in May 1926, only to die two months later in July 1926.

== Personal life ==
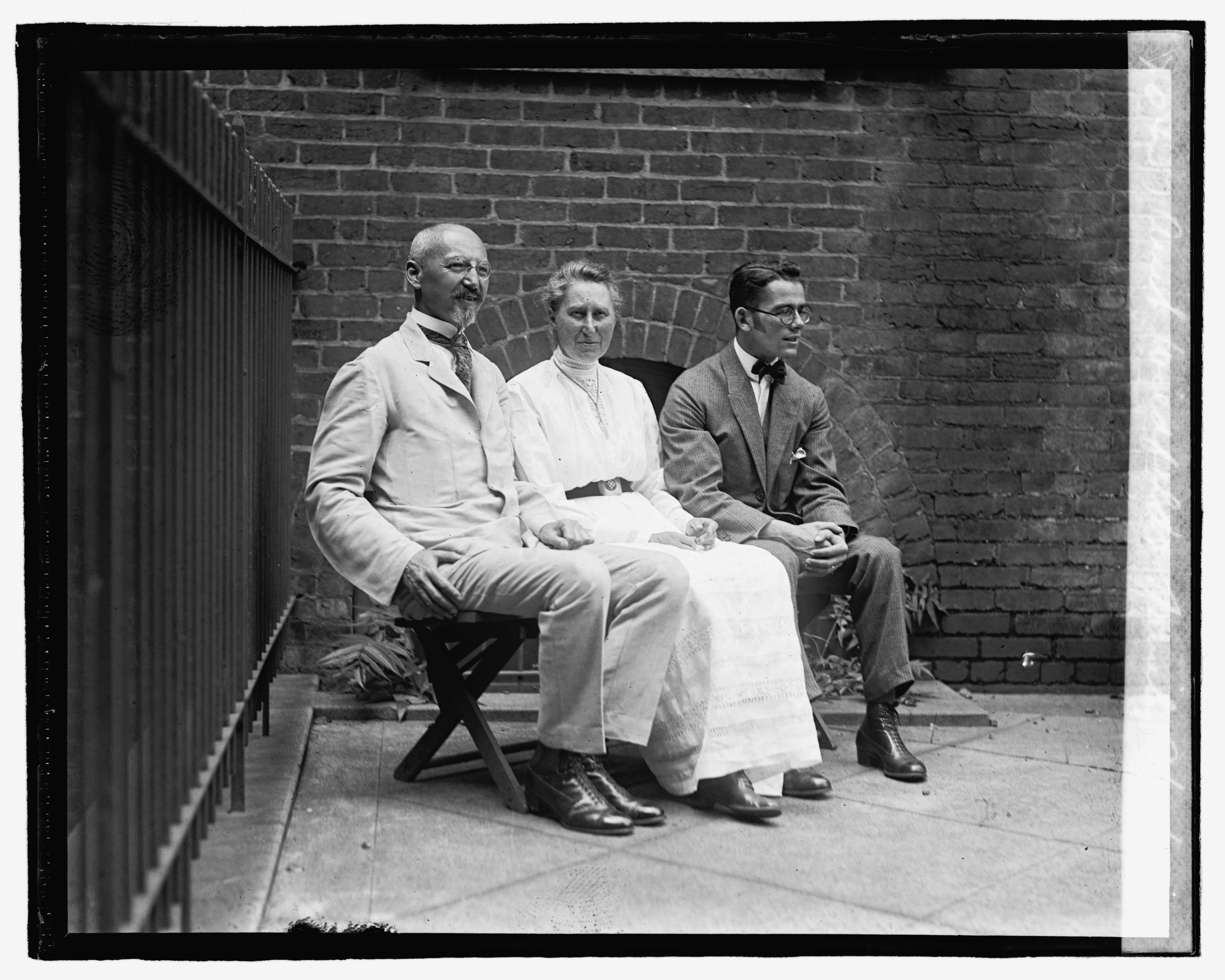
Ambassador Wiedfeldt, his wife, and son, 1922

In 1896, Wiedfeldt married public school teacher Anna Bley (1867–1930), a daughter of Dr. Gustave Bley of Bernburg. He owned a large country place in Mecklenburg. Together, they were the parents of a son:

- Hermann Joachim Wiedfeldt (b. c. 1898), who directed Krupp's farming operations, 150,000 acres in the Don district of Ukraine, which became part of Russia.

Dr Wiedfeldt died of leukemia on 5 July 1926 in Essen "after a long siege of blood metastasis". He was buried in the Meisenburg cemetery in Essen-Bredeney.
