= Hans Thomsen =

German diplomat

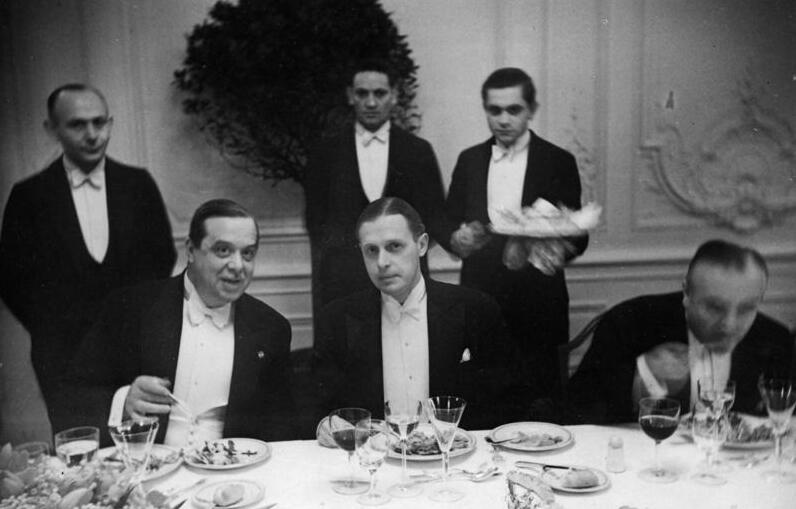
- At center, 1930
- Born: 14 September 1891; Hamburg, Germany
- Died: 31 October 1968 (aged 77); Hamburg, West Germany
- Occupation: Diplomat

Hans Thomsen (14 September 1891 – 31 October 1968) was a German diplomat in the United States.

== Career ==
Thomsen was a son of the Norwegian-born banker Carlo Z. Thomsen. Hans Thomsen held the dr. juris degree, and entered the foreign service in 1919. After being stationed at the consulates-general in Milan and Naples from 1921, he was summoned back to Germany in 1923 where he subsequently advanced in the Ministry of Foreign Affairs ranks.

Thomsen continued as a diplomat for the Third Reich. Thomsen served as Chargé d'Affaires at the Embassy of Germany in Washington, representing the German government in the U.S. from November 1938 (after the recall of ambassador Hans-Heinrich Dieckhoff) to December 11, 1941 (termination of relations after declaration of war). In 1943 he replaced Victor zu Wied (the brother of William, Prince of Albania) at the German delegation in Stockholm, Sweden, remaining there to the end of the war. During late April 1943, he may have been involved in abortive peace negotiations with Alexandra Kollontai, his Soviet counterpart in Stockholm. In November 1944 as relations deteriorated, he was recalled to Germany. Thomsen was interrogated prior to the Nuremberg tribunals but was not charged with any crime. In the early 1950s he served as head of the Hamburg chapter of the Red Cross.

== Thomsen and the isolationists ==
Like Dieckhoff, Thomsen suffered no illusions about the U.S. administration's policy towards Nazi Germany, and he sent warnings to the German government advising them of President Roosevelt's hostility. Therefore, he was involved in several attempts to drum up American isolationist opinion, including efforts to get American authors to write in opposition to American involvement in the War. Thomsen also orchestrated a campaign to influence the 1940 Republican National Convention to pass an anti-war platform. Thomsen reported to the German foreign ministry on June 12, 1940 that a "well-known Republican congressman" had offered to take a group of fifty isolationists to the convention in exchange for $3,000 (equivalent to $69,000 in 2025). Thomsen asked for funds for this and for full page advertisements to be placed in newspapers during the convention. These ads were written by George Viereck, a German agent on the staff of Congressman Hamilton Fish, and appear to have been influential: the wording of the foreign policy plank, reported Thomsen, "was taken almost verbatim" from an ad which appeared in the New York Times and other papers. Fish does not appear to have been personally involved in these efforts, though he headed the National Committee to Keep America Out of Foreign Wars which sponsored the ads.

== Purple cipher ==
In April 1941, Thomsen sent a message to Joachim von Ribbentrop, the German foreign minister, informing him that "an absolutely reliable source" had told him that the Americans had broken the Japanese diplomatic code (code-named "Purple" by the Americans). That source apparently was Konstantin Umansky, the Soviet ambassador to the US, who had deduced the leak based upon communications from U.S. Undersecretary of State Sumner Welles. These warnings were duly forwarded on to the Japanese government, but in the end they were not acted upon, and American cryptographers continued to read Japanese messages through the war.

== Thomsen and Donovan ==
Just before the Pearl Harbor attack, Thomsen was involved in a curious attempt by William Donovan, the United States Coordinator of Information, to recruit him entirely to the American side. Thomsen had been supplying information on German military strength and movements to Malcolm Lovell, a real estate developer involved in Quaker anti-war efforts. Lovell understood himself to be an intermediary and passed the information on to Donovan. These messages included various warnings about Japanese actions and their consequences, including warnings that the Japanese Empire was compelled by its position to attack the United States; on November 13, 1940, he also passed through a message that Germany would join with Japan if the latter were to declare war on the United States. Donovan and Roosevelt were not entirely sure what to make of this information; nonetheless, just before the attack, Donovan offered Thomsen a million dollars in exchange for a public statement distancing himself from the Nazi regime. Donovan's efforts failed, and Thomsen returned to Germany at the end of the year as the U.S. entered the war.
