= Bundespressekonferenz =

German union of journalists

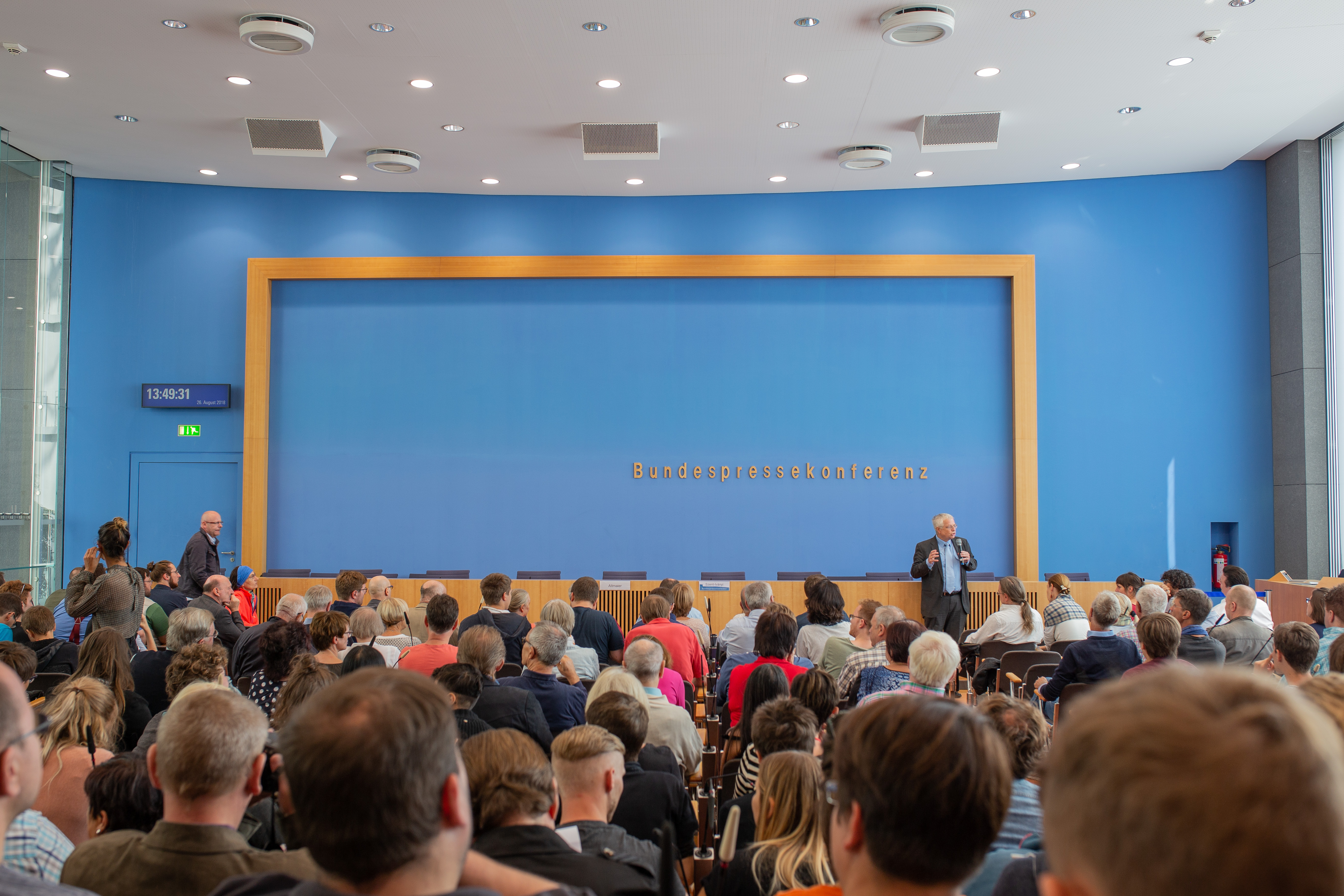
Hall of the Bundespressekonferenz

The Bundespressekonferenz (BPK) (German for "Federal Press Conference") is a union of journalists that report exclusively for German media, and who primarily report from Berlin and Bonn. Following the model of the journalists of the Weimar Republic, the association invites representatives of the German government, as well as political parties, associations and individuals of national political, economic, and social interest to press conferences. It is financed solely through membership fees. Membership of the Bundespressekonferenz is limited exclusively to German journalists that report from either Bonn or Berlin. In December 2020 It has 900 parliamentary correspondents. The most important committee is the general assembly, which appoints the 8 members of the board, who take turns leading press conferences.

== Organization ==
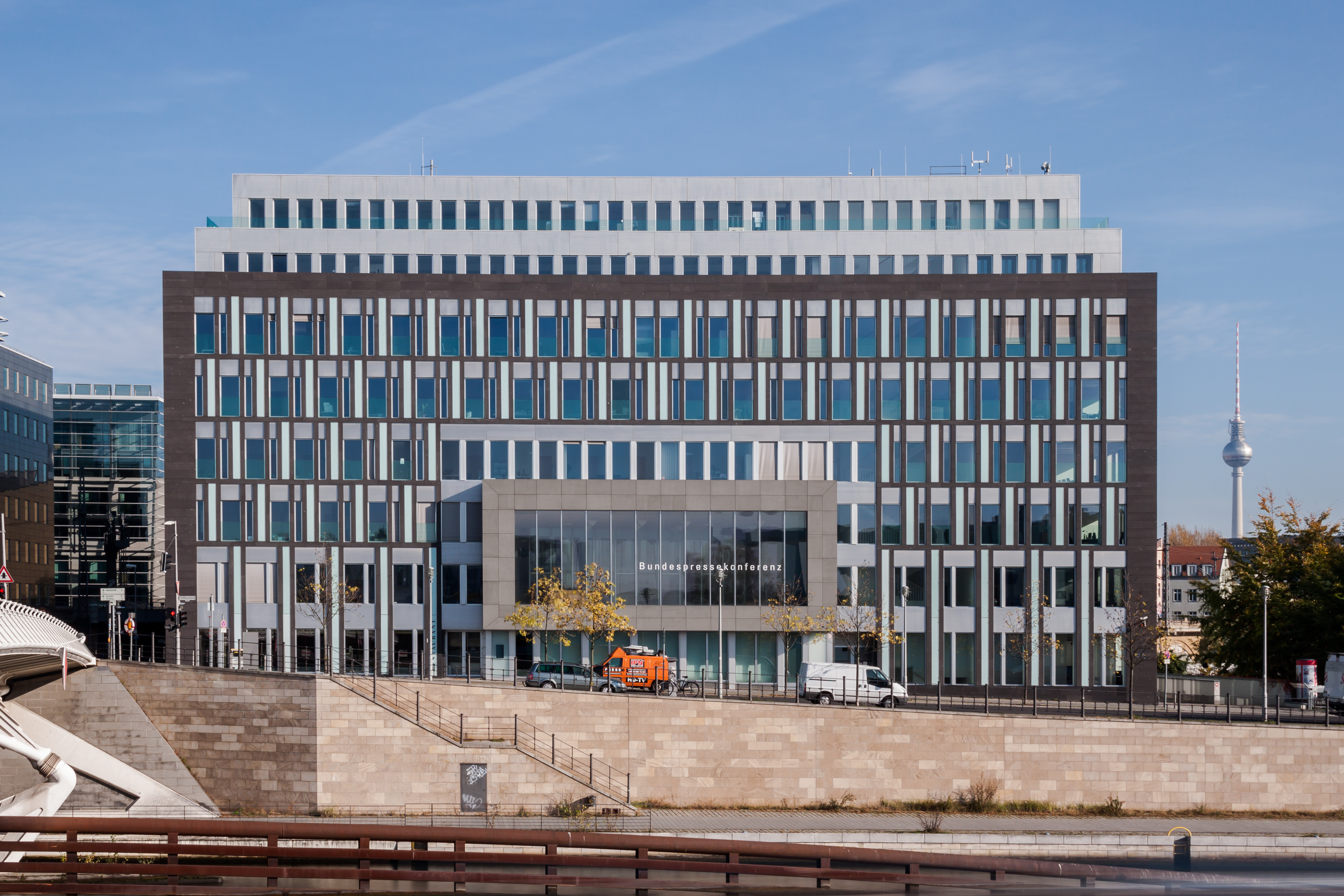
House of the Bundespressekonferenz in Berlin (2014)

The institution was founded in 1949 as a civil law association. It has been a registered association since 19 May 1953, whose stated purpose is to hold press conferences and to provide its members with "opportunities to provide comprehensive information to the public". At first, foreign correspondents also belonged to the BPK, until the Association of the Foreign Press in Germany (VAP) was founded in January 1951. Although it was originally founded in 1906, the VAP was inactive from 1945 to 1951, when it was re-established in the BRD and GDR as separate associations. Alongside members of the BPK, only members of the VAP have the right to participate and ask questions. In October 2009, ninety-three members were still working in the former German capital Bonn, as important political tasks are still performed within the city in its capacity as a federal city. Since 2000, the association has had its own building in the centre of Berlin, rented from the Allianz Group, which also houses offices for correspondents. It was designed by the architects Johanne and Gernot Nalbach in 1998 and completed two years later.

=== Peculiarity ===
In contrast to the practice in many other states, the "hosts" of the federal press conferences are the journalists themselves and not the government, ministries, political parties, associations, think-tanks or individual politicians. This way, even journalists with reputations for critical questions are called on where they may not be in other comparable events in other countries. For the same reason, some guests refrain from appearing before the Federal Press Conference. The Chancellor, for example, usually only comes to the Federal Press Conference once a year, and generally organizes their own press conferences at the Chancellery. Joschka Fischer was also known for avoiding the Federal Press Conference during his time as Foreign Minister.

The government press conference takes place three times a week on Mondays, Wednesdays, and Fridays, to which the press secretaries of the Federal Government and the ministries are invited. After brief introductory statements, they answer questions from the journalists. They may flag particular answers as confidential and it is in line with the journalists' voluntary commitment to the press code to maintain this confidentiality, though in practice, this power is rarely used.

== History ==
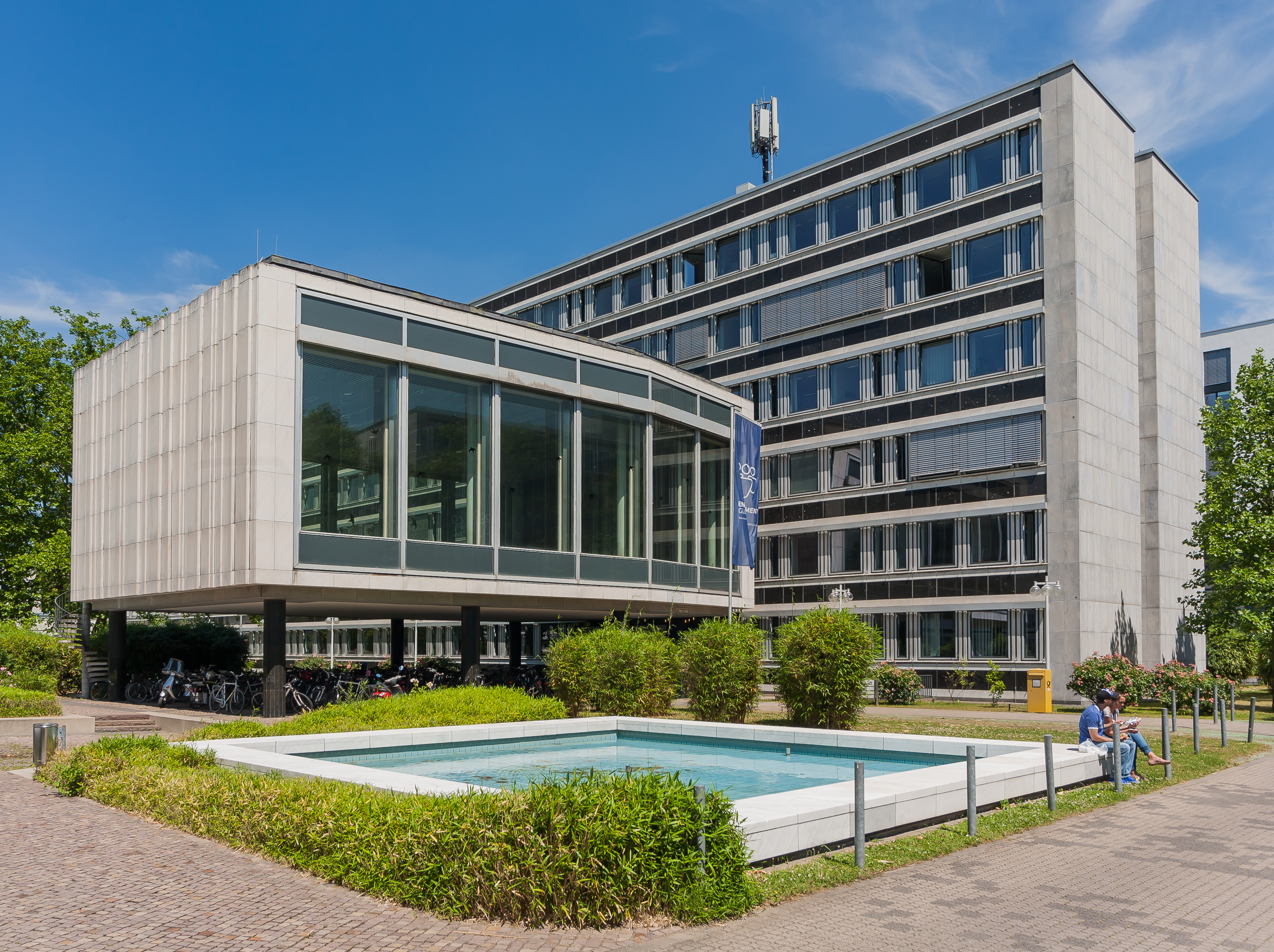
House of the Bundespresskonferenz in Bonn

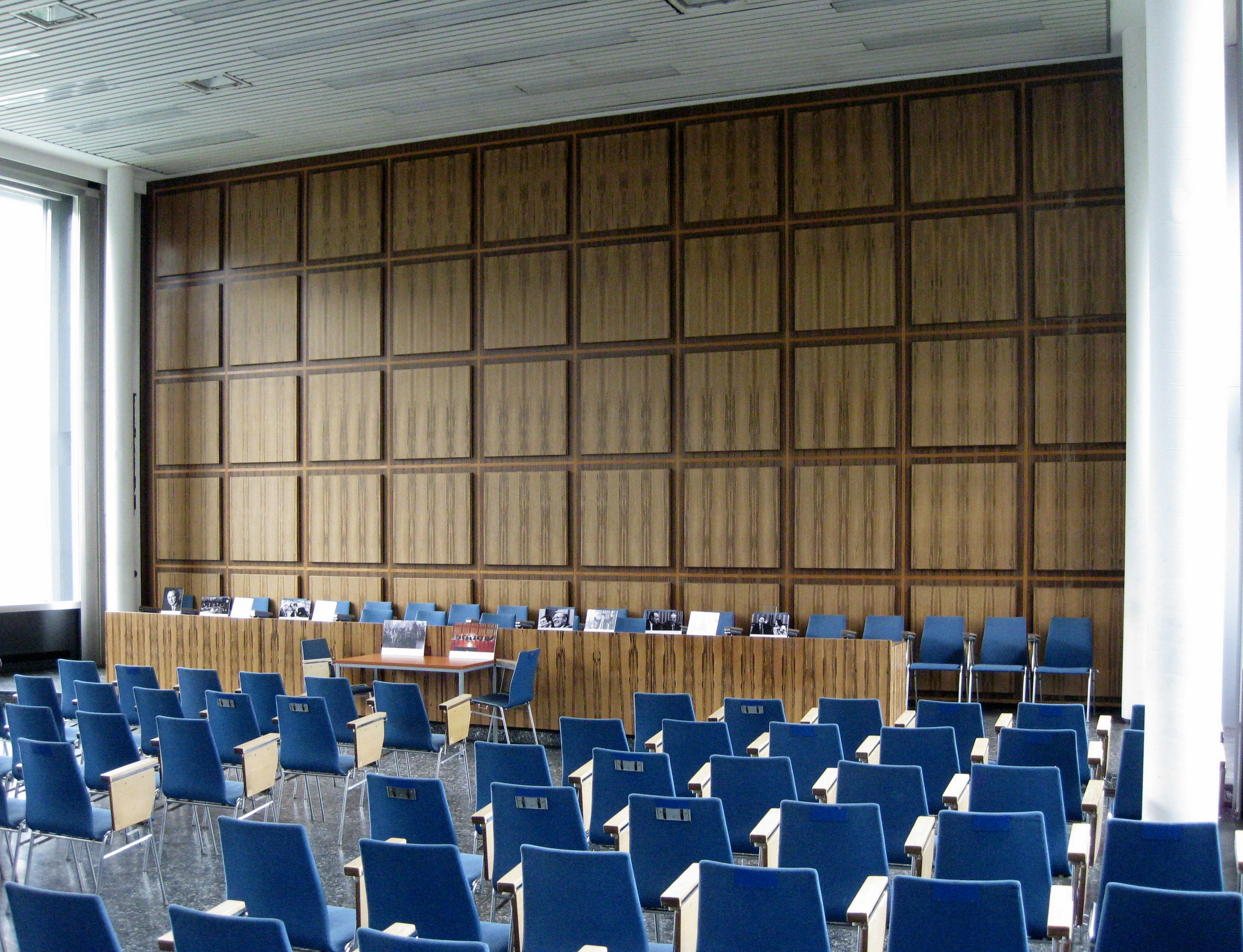
Hall of the Bundespressekonferenz in Bonn

The earliest roots of today's Federal Press Conference are in the press conferences organized by the General Staff of the Imperial Army during the First World War, which held from 1915, the former stock market journalist and Major Georg Schweitzer. He had already been one of the founding members of the Imperial Press Ball. The "teaching of the people" corresponded to the then prevailing patriotic mood.

After the abolition of the monarchy and the founding of the Weimar Republic, the Berlin-based journalists of the leading German daily newspapers took the organization of press conferences into their own hands and invited politicians and government spokespeople as guests, instead of the other way around. After the Second World War, this Weimar style was reinstated. The first instances were the state press conference in Hanover, founded in 1947 and the Frankfurt press conference at the Economic Council, in 1948. It broke up again with the founding of the Federal Republic at the end of 1949 and is regarded as a direct forerunner of the Bundespressekonferenz in Bonn. Many of their founding members moved from the Frankfurt to Bonn, after the Federal Government and Parliament were formed there in 1949.

On 15 September 1949, the day of the first federal election, a group of newspaper correspondents called on "all accredited parliamentary journalists to establish a federal press conference", via a notice in Bonn's Federal Parliament. Four days later, the inaugural meeting took place, but officially the BPK was only constituted on 11 October 1949 with the election of a managing committee. The first press conference held by the BPK took place in the plenary hall of the Federal Council on 17 or 18 October 1949, where Federal Chancellor Konrad Adenauer and Economics Minister Ludwig Erhard answered questions from the members. Later, the press conferences usually took place in the hall of the Defense Committee. Immediately after the founding of the BPK, several members of the executive board were entrusted with one of the most urgent organizational tasks of the postwar period: the procurement of housing for the Bonn journalists. At that time, only 10% of members were entitled to social housing, which was originally intended only for employees of the Bundestag. Therefore, a number of journalists also lived in the Reutersiedlung, the first such an estate in Bonn. After further subsidies (such assistance for surviving family members) were added, the Social Fund of the Federal Press Conference was launched.

After the construction of the Berlin Wall in 1961, there was a change to the statutes in the autumn to exclude all East German correspondents from the BPK. It was the only exclusion against accredited journalists in the more than 40-year history of the Bonn Republic. It lasted for almost 10 years, until 8 February 1971, when the "Exclusion Paragraph" for East German journalists was removed from the statute, and three years later they were allowed admission to the Foreign Press Association. From October 1967, the federal press conference was located in the so-called "Pressehaus" in the government District in Bonn, which housed its hall, where conferences were held in front of a distinctive wall with rosewood panels. After the fall of the Berlin Wall, the BPK supported the founding of the "Press Conference Capital Berlin" in the spring of 1990, which became the "Berlin branch of the BPK" after German unity. With the relocation of government and parliament to Berlin in 1999, the BPK's headquarters followed. The room in which the Federal Press Conference takes place, as well as the offices of the club employees, are rented from Allianz, which owns the building. Even after moving to Berlin, the Federal Press Conference is still represented at a branch office in the Bonn federal district. In her final speech on 4 August 1999 in Bonn, the then deputy spokeswoman Charima Reinhardt said the number of press conferences held there was "between 9,000 and 10,000".

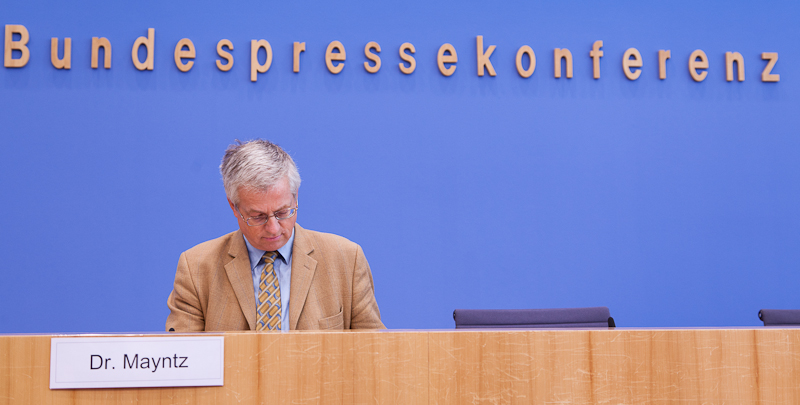
Gregor Mayntz, chairman since 2011

=== Chairs ===
- 1950–1951: Irnfried Freiherr von Wechmar
- 1951–1952: Fritz Brühl
- 1952: Karl Lohmann
- 1953: Franz Rodens
- 1953–1954: Wilhelm K. Papenhoff
- 1954–1956: Ferdinand Himpele
- 1956–1961: Harald O. Herrmann
- 1961–1962: Wolf Dietrich
- 1962–1963: Reinhard Appel
- 1963–1967: Hans Viefhaus
- 1968–1970: Hans Reiser
- 1971: Ernst Ney
- 1972–1973: Jürgen Lorenz
- 1974–1975: Hans Werner Kettenbach
- 1976–1980: Ernst Ney
- 1981–1989: Rudolf Strauch
- 1990–1995: Sten Martenson
- 1995–1999: Heinz Schweden
- 1999–2003: Tissy Bruns
- 2003–2011: Werner Gößling
- 2011–2020: Gregor Mayntz
- since 2020: Mathis Feldhoff

== Socialfunds Bundespressekonferenz ==
The Sozialfonds Bundespressekonferenz is an independent self-help institution of members of the Federal Press Conference in the form of a registered non-profit association based in Berlin. The members come from the circle of the Federal Press Conference. The annual meeting of the members advises on social measures and oversees the finances of the association. Its members elect a three-member board, which then elects a chair. The purpose of the Fund is to assist journalists or their surviving families in distress through ongoing financial contributions or one-time subsidies. The financial aid of the Social Fund comes primarily from the proceeds of the tombola of the annual Bundespresseball in Berlin. In addition, the association receives irregular donations from sponsors. Recipients of these services are primarily former or current members of the Federal Press Conference. The Board decides on grants after examining the individual cases.

== Award of the Bundespressekonferenz ==
Since 2014, the so-called Prize of the Federal Press Conference – a keyboard engraved in crystal – has been awarded annually as part of the Federal Press Ball. The price honors extraordinary efforts for the freedom of the press. Previous winners are the Reuters correspondent Gernot Heller (2014), Der Spiegel reporter Christoph Reuter (2015), the long-time director of the ARD (broadcaster) studio in Brussels Rolf-Dieter Krause (2016), the Deutsche Presse-Agentur correspondent Kristina Dunz (2017), and the Phoenix journalists Gerd-Joachim von Fallois and Erhard Scherfer.
