= Rüdiger von Wechmar =

German diplomat (1923–2007)

Baron Rüdiger von Wechmar
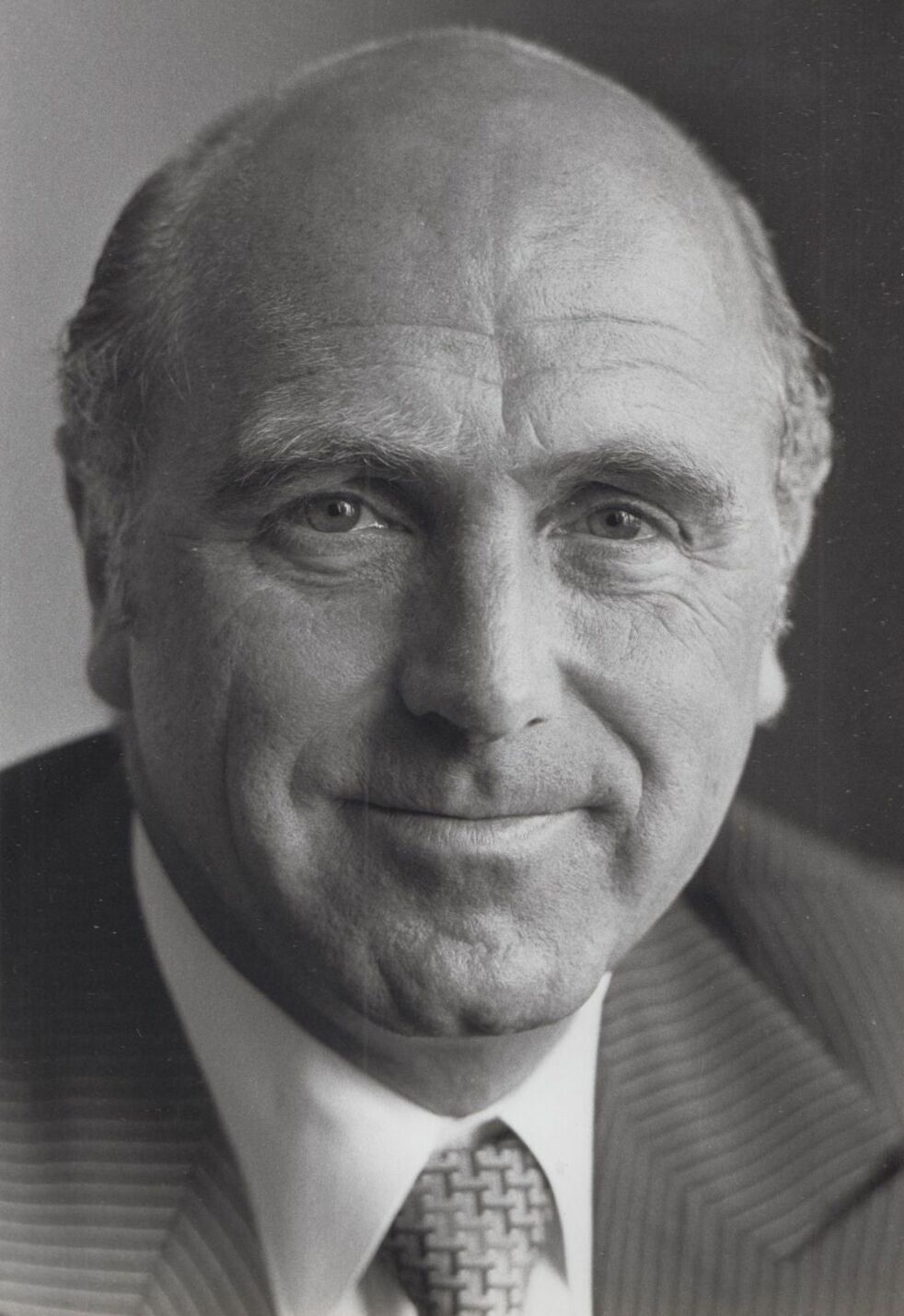
- Wechmar, c. 1974

German Ambassador to the United Kingdom
- In office 1983–1988
- Preceded by: Jürgen Ruhfus
- Succeeded by: Hermann von Richthofen

President of the United Nations General Assembly
- In office 1980–1981
- Preceded by: Salim Ahmed Salim
- Succeeded by: Ismat T. Kittani

Personal details
- Born: 15 November 1923 Berlin, Germany
- Died: 17 October 2007 (aged 83) Munich, Germany
- Parent: Irnfried Freiherr von Wechmar

Baron Rüdiger von Wechmar (15 November 1923 – 17 October 2007) was a German diplomat. He was West German ambassador to the UN in the 1970s. During the thirty-fifth ordinary and the eighth emergency special sessions, from 1980 to 1981, he was President of the United Nations General Assembly.

== Early life ==
Wechmar was born in Berlin, Germany, the son of Irnfried Freiherr von Wechmar. In 1941, while a 17-year-old student at a National Political Institute of Education ("Napola"), he joined the German Army as a volunteer, and fought in the Afrika Korps under Erwin Rommel for two years, until he was taken prisoner of war by the Americans. While imprisoned in the United States, he studied journalism.

After the war ended, Wechmar worked as a journalist, and in 1958 he entered the diplomatic service. He was posted to the German embassy in Washington and to the Consulate General in New York.

In 1963, he became a correspondent for German television in Eastern Europe, but returned to the diplomatic service in 1968. The following year he was appointed as under-secretary of state and government spokesman. In 1974 he became ambassador to the United Nations. He represented West Germany as president of the UN Security Council in 1977 and 1978 and was later the West German Ambassador in Italy (1981-1983) and in the United Kingdom (1983-1988). Baron von Wechmar was a member of the multinational Bilderberg Group.

== Personal life ==
Wechmar was married and with his wife had three children.

== Death ==
He died of a stroke on October 17, 2007 in Munich, Germany.

Diplomatic posts
| Preceded by Salim A. Salim | President of the United Nations General Assembly; 1980-1981 | Succeeded by Ismat T. Kittani |
| Preceded by Jürgen Ruhfus | German Ambassador to the United Kingdom; 1983–1988 | Succeeded by Hermann von Richthofen |
