= Immo Stabreit =

German diplomat (1933–2025)

Immo F. H. Stabreit (24 January 1933 – 1 November 2025) was a German diplomat, who was West German and German Ambassador to South Africa from 1987 to 1992, Ambassador to the United States from 1992 to 1995, and Ambassador to France from 1995 to 1998. He was a Member of the Advisory Board of the Global Panel Foundation, a respected NGO that works behind the scenes in crisis areas around the world.

== Life and career ==
Stabreit was born in Rathenow, Brandenburg, Prussia, Germany on 24 January 1933. He grew up in Berlin. Stabreit graduated from Princeton University, with a bachelor's degree (BA) in 1953, and studied law Free University of Berlin and Ruprecht Karls University of Heidelberg, with a Ph.D. in 1963.

From 1964 to 1966, Stabreit was First Secretary at the Foreign Office in Bonn. He was First Secretary Department of the Soviet Union from 1966 to 1973, and served as Deputy Head of the Soviet Union office in Bonn, from 1974 to 1975. He studied at the Advanced Study Program at Harvard University. Stabreit served in the International Energy Agency in Paris, until 1978.

In 1983, Stabreit became Head of Department for Foreign Affairs. He was ambassador to South Africa, from 1987 to 1992, and ambassador in Paris, from 1995 to 1998. He retired in 2002.

Stabreit died on 1 November 2025, at the age of 92.

== Works ==
- Die Revision multilateraler völkerrechtlicher Verträge durch eine begrenzte Anzahl der Vertragsparteien, 223 S. 1964.
- "Die EPZ als Faktor der internationalen Politik. Entstehung, Funktionsweise, Perspektive", in: Elemente des Wandels in der westlichen Welt, Hrsg. Coulmas, P. 1979, S. 287-298.
- "Die Ergebnisse der KIWZ im Energiebereich", (Konferenz über internationale wirtschaftliche Zusammenarbeit, KIWZ)
- with Benno Zündorf: Die Ostverträge. Die Verträge von Moskau, Warschau, Prag, das Berlin-Abkommen und die Verträge mit der DDR, München 1979.
- "Yugoslav Breakup: Don't Blame Germany", The Washington Post 29. June 1993
