= Jens Hanefeld =

German diplomat (born 1964)

Jens Hanefeld (born 1964) is a German diplomat. He has served as Ambassador of the Federal Republic of Germany to the United States and Head of Mission at the German Embassy in Washington, D.C., since August 2025.

Hanefeld studied modern history and English at the Free University of Berlin and graduated with a Master of Arts degree in 1990. He is married and has three children.

== Diplomatic career ==
Hanefeld joined the German Foreign Service in 1991 as an attaché. His early postings included:

- 1991–1994: Federal Foreign Office, Bonn
- 1994–1997: German Embassy, Sofia
- 1997–2000: German Embassy, Washington, D.C.
- 2000–2001: Desk officer in the Political Department, Federal Foreign Office, Berlin

From 2001 to 2005, he served as private secretary to the State Secretary at the Federal Foreign Office. From 2005 to 2009, he headed the Office of the State Secretaries in Berlin.

In 2009, he returned to Washington, D.C., as Minister and Deputy Chief of Mission (envoy and permanent representative) at the German Embassy, serving until 2014.

=== Secondment to Volkswagen (2014–2024) ===
From 2014 to 2024, Hanefeld was seconded from the Foreign Service to the Volkswagen Group, where he served as Senior Vice President for International, European, and Trade Policy. This secondment occurred in the aftermath of the Volkswagen emissions scandal. In 2018, he temporarily assumed additional responsibilities in government and external relations following the suspension of another senior lobbyist. The move was defended by the German government as a way to strengthen ties between diplomacy and the business community, though it drew scrutiny from lobby-monitoring groups.

=== Ambassador to Ethiopia and Permanent Observer to the African Union (2024–2025) ===
In September 2024, Hanefeld returned to active diplomatic service as Ambassador of Germany to Ethiopia and Permanent Observer to the African Union, based at the German Embassy in Addis Ababa. He presented his credentials to Ethiopian President Taye Atske Selassie. During his tenure, he highlighted Ethiopia’s homegrown economic reforms (including macroeconomic, financial-sector, and currency measures) as “brave, courageous, and encouraging.” He emphasized Germany’s support for Ethiopia’s green energy potential, national reconciliation efforts following the Tigray conflict, and the benefits of the African Continental Free Trade Area. He left the post in August 2025.

=== Ambassador to the United States (since 2025) ===
Since 8 August 2025, Hanefeld has served as German Ambassador to the United States, succeeding Andreas Michaelis. His appointment was described in some circles as unexpected but was seen as drawing on his extensive prior experience in Washington and his private-sector background amid evolving transatlantic relations.

In his current role, he has focused on economic and technological cooperation. In January 2026, he signed a Joint Declaration of Intent with Florida Governor Ron DeSantis to promote investment and collaboration in advanced manufacturing, aerospace, life sciences, and workforce training. He has also visited institutions such as Florida State University to underscore transatlantic research partnerships.

== Personal life ==
Hanefeld is married and has three children.
