= Ludwig Niederstetter =

Prussian diplomat and civil servant

Ludwig von Niederstetter (1788–1846) was a Prussian diplomat, civil servant, and Prussian Chargé d'Affaires to the United States from 1825 to 1830.

He was head of the regency in Szczecin.

He was the Prussian charge d'affaires in the U.S.; on May 1, 1828 he signed a commercial treaty with the Americans (Frederick William III ratified it in 1829), the third major agreement between the U.S. and Prussia after the Treaty of Friendship to 1785, and the treaty of commerce of 1799.
