= Peter Hermes =

German diplomat

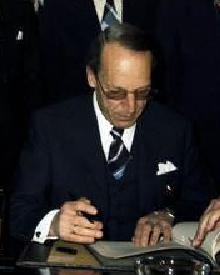

West German Ambassador to the Holy See
- In office August 1984 – August 1987
- President: Richard von Weizsäcker
- Preceded by: Walter Gehlhoff
- Succeeded by: Paul Verbeek

West German Ambassador to the United States
- In office November 1979 – July 1984
- President: Karl Carstens
- Preceded by: Berndt von Staden
- Succeeded by: Günther van Well

Personal details
- Born: 8 August 1922 Berlin, Germany
- Died: 14 October 2015 (aged 93) Bonn, Germany
- Party: Christian Democratic Union
- Spouse: Maria Wirmer (m. 1955)
- Education: University of Bonn
- Awards: Knight Commander's Cross of the Order of Merit (1982)
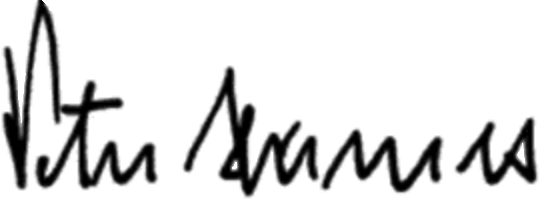
- Signature

Military service
- Allegiance: Germany
- Branch/service: Luftwaffe
- Years of service: 1941–1945
- Unit: Flak Corps
- Battles/wars: World War II

Peter Hermes (8 August 1922 – 14 October 2015) was a German diplomat, best known for serving as West German Ambassador to the United States from 1979 to 1984 and West German Ambassador to the Holy See from 1984 to 1987.

== Early life and military service ==
Hermes was born in Berlin, as the son of agricultural scientist and politician Andreas Hermes. He was drafted in 1941, and served in a penal battalion in 1944. He was captured by the Soviets. His father founded the CDU in the Soviet occupation zone, but left in 1945. Peter Hermes left East Germany in 1950.

== Diplomatic career ==
Beginning in 1953, he was trade negotiator for the Foreign Office, and Head of the Department of Foreign Trade and Development, and European economic integration.

He completed a doctorate degree in law. In 1955, he joined the Diplomatic Service. He eventually became Secretary of State at the Foreign Office from 1975 to 1979. He was Ambassador of the Federal Republic of Germany in Washington, from 1979 to 1984. He was Ambassador of the Federal Republic of Germany to the Vatican, from August 1984 to 1987.

After retirement, he became a member of the Commission for Contemporary History Association, and deputy chairman of the Association of the German Archaeological Institute. He is an honorary member of the German Archaeological Institute.
