= Friedrich Ludwig von Rönne =

Prussian jurist, politician and diplomat

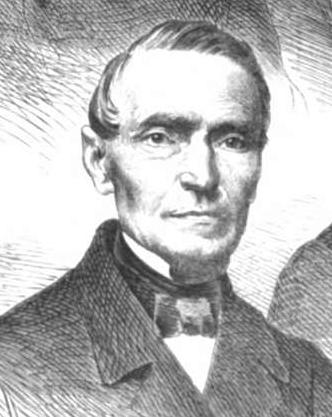

German Ambassador to the United States
- In office 1834–1844
- Preceded by: Friedrich von Gerolt
- Succeeded by: Friedrich von Gerolt

Personal details
- Born: 27 November 1798 Seestermühe, Uetersen
- Died: 7 April 1865 (aged 66) Berlin

Friedrich Ludwig von Ronne (27 November 1798 – 7 April 1865) was a Prussian jurist, politician, diplomat and Ambassador of thd Kingdom of Prussia to the United States.

== Early life ==
Ronne was the son of Johann Georg von Ronne. One brother was the future lawyer and politician Ludwig von Ronne.

Ronne attended high school in Glückstadt. He also received private lessons in Berlin, from the late politician and law professor Charles Twesten.

He enlisted into the King's German Legion at 16 years old, and took part in the Battle of Waterloo. Later he studied law in Kiel and Berlin.

== Career ==
In 1820, he joined the Prussian judicial service. In 1825, he was High Court Judge in Hamm. He actually wrote a paper on the marital community of property in Brandenburg. In 1828, he moved to the Superior Court of Justice in Berlin. During this period he produced a revision of the system of the Prussian civil law. He was responsible for the first volume, his brother Louis took over the second volume.

In 1831, he went into the civil service, and worked for the government in Potsdam. Ronne proved to be knowledgeable in customs and trade issues, but also in constitutional and international legal issues, and was promoted by Prime Minister Jean Pierre Frédéric Ancillon.

=== Ambassador in Washington ===
In 1834, Ronne was appointed Minister Resident (i.e. Ambassador) of Prussia in the U.S. with headquarters in Washington. He was replaced in 1844, by Friedrich von Gerolt.

In the United States, he was familiar with the local fair trade, also traveled extensively. He also tried to care for German immigrants. He did not succeed in a commercial contract between the German Customs Union, and the United States. He succeeded with the extension of the trade agreement the United States with the Hanseatic cities of Bremen and Hamburg. His reputation in the U.S. was so great that the Government in 1839, asked him to be a mediator in the dispute with Mexico. A war could not be avoided through the mediation of Ronne. Later he also became involved in a dispute between England and France in the rubber trade in Senegal.

=== Head of the Prussian commercial office ===
In Prussia, business representatives and the establishment of a Department of Commerce, called for Ronne to be their head. In a memorandum to Ronne spoke directly for the king of under-standing trade department with a close contact with the merchants. That proposal met with opposition in the government. King Friedrich Wilhelm IV made him leader under trade and commerce authority. Ronne was president of the new authority, with the rank of first class Council. At the same time he was appointed to the Privy Council. He failed to develop the office, with the opposition of the bureaucracy. After the March revolution in Berlin, a Commerce Department was created, but the job was not to Ronne.

=== National Assembly, and Messenger ===
Ronne was elected in 1848, to the Frankfurt National Assembly. In Frankfurt, he was a member of the Casino Group. Ronne was chairman of the economic committee. In a memorandum he tried to make available in the United States findings for the German conditions. His ideas were incorporated into the economic parts of the constitution.

That same year he went as envoy extraordinary to the provisional central government since 1849, and also as an envoy of the Archduke Johann Regent back to Austria from Washington. Again he took advantage of his stay for in-depth studies and even planned to write a story about the U.S. Constitution. But he was involved in internal political disputes of the Union as regards the introduction of paper money as legal tender.

In 1849, he secured the release of the Hansa (formerly called the United States), constructed at the New York Navy Yard, for the war against Denmark.

After the end of the central government rejected the Prussian government, under Friedrich Wilhelm Graf von Brandenburg's request Ronne, to leave as Prussian ambassador to the United States. As a reason she said he had accepted the ambassadorial post without approval by the Prussian government. Ronne retired at his own request in 1857.

=== Prussian deputies ===
After the start of new era in 1858, he became a member of the Prussian House of Representatives. He was liberal, and was a member of the old liberal faction of Georg von Vincke. In many debates, Ronne participated. Since 1862, he was a member of the German Progress Party. He was one of the most important members of the party. He stood on a rather right wing. The constitutional conflict Ronne stood with his party in opposition to the government.

In 1863, he called for the independence of the duchies of Schleswig and Holstein. He declared himself a friend of the Polish nation, and criticized the Polish uprising of Prussia against the directional agreement with Russia. Basically, he was opposed to the idea that German unity was to be postponed until after the creation of a liberal Prussian government. At the same time he was skeptical what a government would do under Otto von Bismarck, with nation-state politics.
