= Ismat T. Kittani =

Iraqi politician

Ismat Taha Kittani
- عصمت طه كتاني
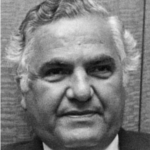

President of the United Nations General Assembly
- In office 1981–1982
- Preceded by: Rüdiger von Wechmar
- Succeeded by: Imre Hollai

Personal details
- Born: 5 April 1929 Amedi, Iraq
- Died: 23 October 2001 (aged 72) Geneva, Switzerland
- Education: Knox College, Illinois

Ismat Taha Kittani (Arabic: عصمت طه كتاني; 5 April 1929 – 23 October 2001) was an Iraqi politician, most notable for being President of the United Nations General Assembly during its thirty-sixth session in 1981 and 1982.

== Early life ==
Ismat Kittani was born on 5 April 1929 in the Kurdish region of Northern Iraq in a town called Amedi. He was raised under poor circumstances and he liked to point out that he had not seen electric light till he was 12.

In 1946, Kittani received a scholarship to go study abroad and enrolled in Knox College.

During his time at Knox he played an active role in student affairs, serving as Student council member and as a chairman of the newly found honor code system. He was an active member of the international relations club as well and graduated in 1951 with an A.B. degree in international relations.

== Career ==
In 1952 Kittani worked as a high school teacher briefly before joining the international affairs section of the Ministry of foreign services and in 1954 was assigned to the Iraqi embassy in Cairo as an attache. He served in Iraq's United Nation mission from 1957 to 1961 where he was a delegate to a number of councils which included the United Nations Security Council and the World Health Organization. After that he went to Geneva to serve as the delegate of Iraq in Geneva - Switzerland from 1961 up till 1964.

In 1964 he was elected as the secretariat for the Economic and social council in New York. In 1971 he became the assistant secretary general for Inter-Agency affairs, and in 1973 he became the chief of staff for Secretary General Kurt Waldheim. He remained in New York until 1975.

He went back to Baghdad in 1975 and was elected as the head of an international organizations department at the foreign ministry and as an under secretary where he had to make frequent trips back and forth to New York and right before his secretariat position of the United Nations Security Council, in 1980 he was an under secretary in the Iraqi ministry of foreign affairs.

He received an honorary degree from Knox College on Saturday, 5 June 1982 where he was also one of the commencement speakers encouraging the youth of that time.

On September 15, 1985 he represented Iraq in the United Nations Security Council and was elected as the 36th president of the United Nations Security Council general assembly. He succeeded Rudiger Von Wechmar of Germany.

He had a rather unusual election, where he was elected by drawing lots and after two rounds of secret balloting it left him in a locked position with his opponent, Mohammed Kaiser of Bangladesh.

Kittani was representing a nation that was still recovering from an invasion that was carried out by his country to its neighboring nation (Iran).

== Retirement and death ==
Kittani retired in 1989 and went on to help diplomats in their UN careers. On October 23, 2001 he died at the age of 72 due to cancer. He was survived by a son named Dara.
