= Friedrich von Gerolt =

German diplomat (1797–1879)

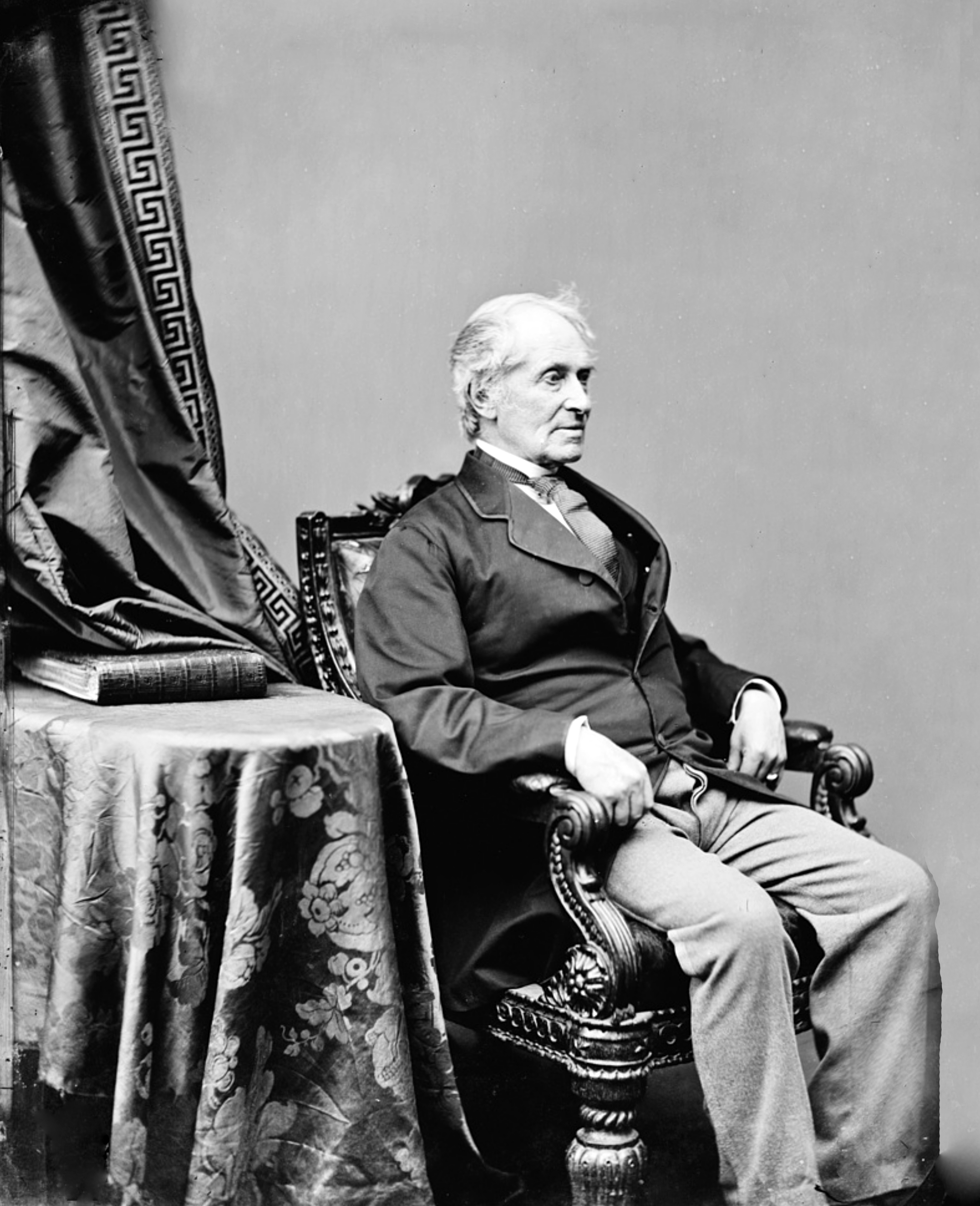
Friedrich von Gerolt

Friedrich Karl Joseph Freiherr von Gerolt (5 March 1797 Bonn – 27 July 1879 Linz am Rhein) was Prussian Privy Councillor, Envoy Extraordinary and Minister Plenipotentiary in the United States.

== Family ==
Gerolt was born the son of the German jurist and politician Bernard Franz Josef of Gerolt and his wife, Anna Katharina Josepha Caroline v. Bouget from Odenkirchen. He descended from the Gerolt family, which was founded on 3 January 1558 in Prague, and was awarded the coat of arms on 16 April 1614, knighted in the Castle of Linz in Austria by Emperor Matthias.

He married on 28 August 1837 in Bonn, Huberta Josephine Henriette Walter, daughter of Privy Councillor at the former Court of Appeal in Wetzlar, Walter Francis Martin, and his wife Anna Maria de Noel.

== Life ==
He studied mining and geology in 1823, and was listed as Mining Office secretary in Düren. In March 1824, he traveled to Mexico, prospecting for silver mines, and published a geological map in 1828. King Friedrich Wilhelm III invested, him and his brothers in 1830, with the Leyen manor (now Castle Ockenfels in Ockenfels). In 1837, he was chargé d'affaires in Mexico and at the suggestion of Alexander von Humboldt in 1844, made Extraordinary Envoy and Minister of the Kingdom of Prussia to the United States of America. In October 1848, he was superseded by Friedrich Ludwig von Rönne. He sought comment on a German constitution from John C. Calhoun. From 1849 to 1868, he was again sent as ambassador of Prussia to Washington from 1868 until the empire was founded in 1871, he was then working for the North German Confederation as an envoy in Washington. In 1852, he negotiated an extradition treaty with Daniel Webster. In 1858, Gerolt was elevated to Freiherr.

Gerolt was consistently 27 years as a diplomat in the United States and is still regarded as the longest serving ambassador of Germany in the U.S. During his time in Washington, he maintained good contacts with many politicians, including several presidents and government ministers. In the quarter century of service, Gerolt saw presidents James K. Polk, Zachary Taylor, Millard Fillmore, Franklin Pierce, James Buchanan, Abraham Lincoln, Andrew Johnson, and Ulysses Grant.

Millard Fillmore was the only incumbent U.S. president, who visited Germany in the 19th century. In 1855, he met with Alexander von Humboldt and King Friedrich Wilhelm IV together in Berlin. In this period 1.5 million German emigrated to the U.S., and there were a total of 14 German consulates in New York, Philadelphia, Baltimore, Charleston, New Orleans, St. Louis, Galveston, Savannah, Cincinnati, San Francisco, Louisville, Milwaukee, Chicago, Boston and New Bedford.

== Sources ==
- Dr. Ralph Lutz, Die Beziehungen zwischen Deutschland und den Vereinigten Staaten während des Sezessionskrieges, Heidelberg 1911th
- Enno Eimers, Preussen und die USA 1850 bis 1867. Transatlantische Wechselwirkungen, Duncker & Humblot, Berlin 2004, ISBN 3-428-11577-5
