= Karl Heinrich Knappstein =

German journalist and diplomat (1906–1989)

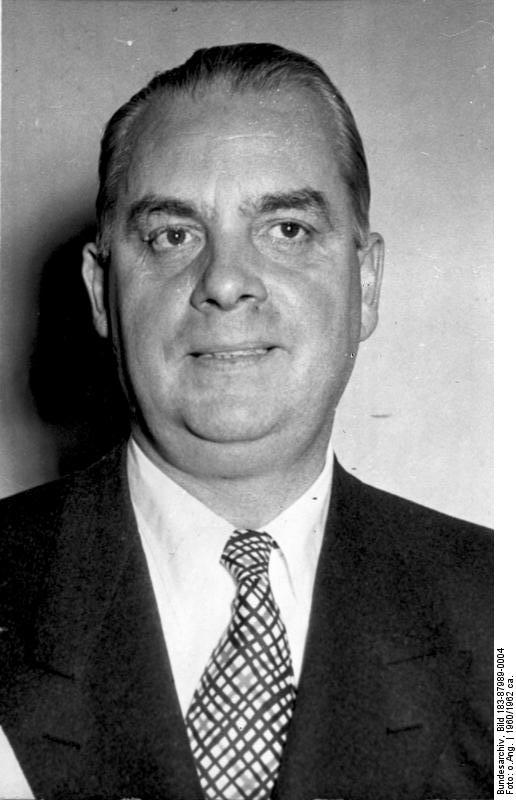
Karl Heinrich Knappstein (1960)

Karl Heinrich Knappstein (15 April 1906 – 6 May 1989) was a German journalist, diplomat, and German Ambassador to the United States, from 1962 to 1968.

== Life ==
Knappstein was born in Bochum in 1906.

He studied law, economics and sociology at the universities of Cologne, Bonn, Berlin, Geneva and Cincinnati (Ohio). From 1937 to 1943, he was editor of the Frankfurter Zeitung, from 1945 to 1948, he served as Assistant Secretary in the Hesse Ministry for political liberation, and from 1948 to 1950, he was chief press officer of the Board of Directors of United Economic Area.

From 1950 to 1951, he worked at the West German Consulate General in New York, in 1951 he was appointed consul general in Chicago. In 1956, he was ambassador in Madrid (Spain), from 1958 to 1960 he was Deputy Secretary of State at the Foreign Office, and from 1960 to 1962 he was an observer of the Federal Republic to the United Nations.

He was involved in discussions on the Berlin crisis, and on the multilateral nuclear force, with respect to the Élysée Treaty signed by Konrad Adenauer and Charles de Gaulle .

He died in Bad Homburg in 1989.
