= Harold Sturtevant =

United States Navy sailor

Harold Sturtevant was a sailor in the United States Navy. In January 1941, he and fellow sailor E.C. Lackey climbed up the fire escape of the building which housed the German consulate in San Francisco, California, and slashed and tore down the flag of Nazi Germany which was flying there in honor of the 7th anniversary of the founding of the Third Reich. The two men were arrested, tried, court martialed for malicious mischief and received a dishonorable discharge from the Navy. The German Foreign Ministry protested the incident and the United States Department of State expressed their regrets. Later that year, after Germany declared war on the United States, Sturtevant received a pardon and reenlisted in the Navy.

== See also ==
- Second World War
- Flag desecration
