= Irnfried Freiherr von Wechmar =

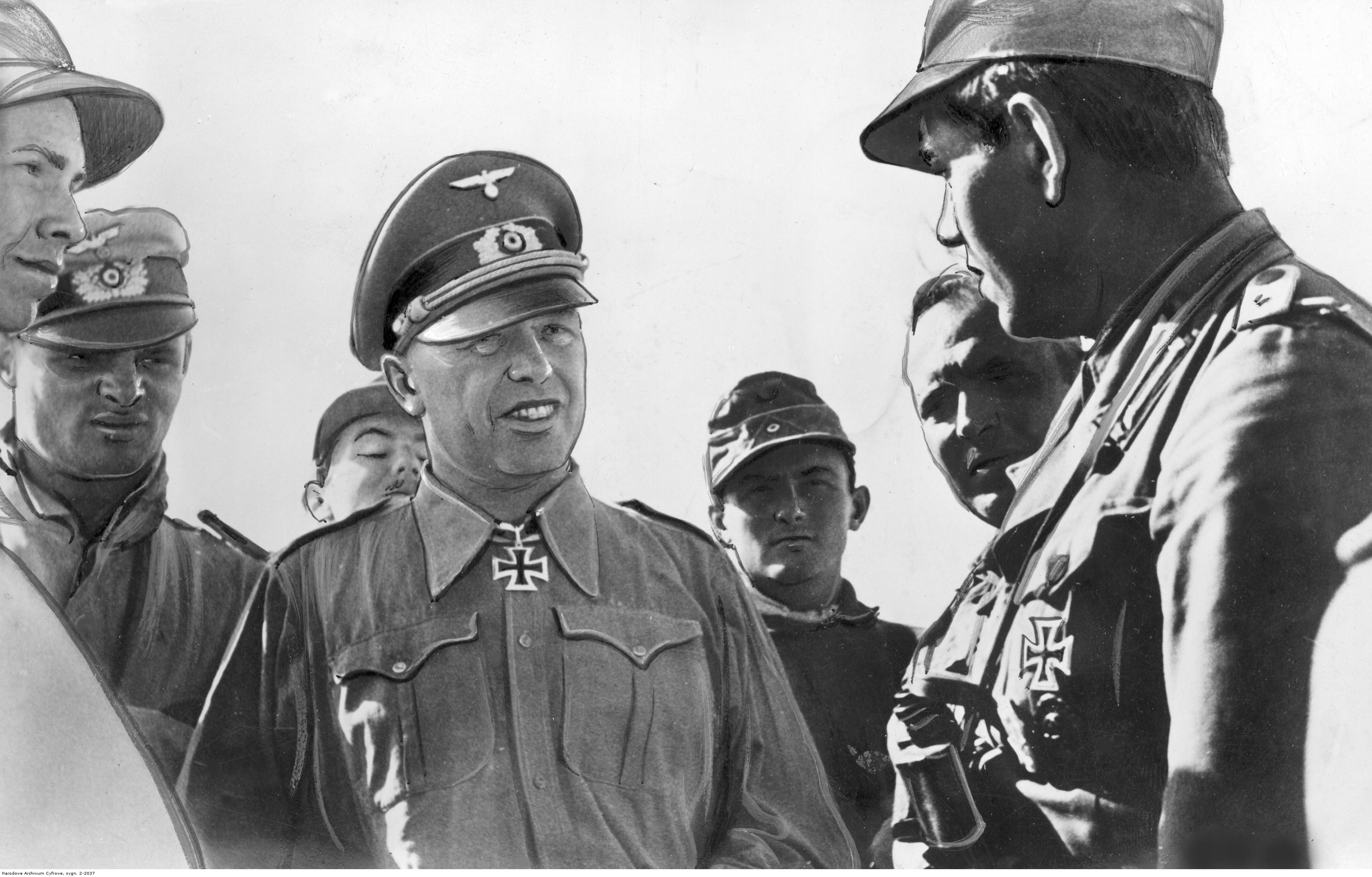
- Irnfried Freiherr von Wechmar (in the middle) during the North African campaign
- Born: 12 February 1899; Frankfurt
- Died: 27 November 1959 (aged 60); Bonn
- Relatives: Rüdiger von Wechmar (son)
- Military career
- Allegiance: German Empire (to 1918); Weimar Republic (to 1933); Nazi Germany (to 1945); West Germany
- Branch: Army; Bundeswehr
- Service years: 1914–1922; 1933–1945; 1956–1959
- Rank: Oberst (Wehrmacht); Oberst der Reserve (Bundeswehr)
- Commands: Aufklärungs-Abteilung 3
- Conflicts: World War I World War II: Invasion of Poland; Battle of France; North African Campaign
- Awards: Knight's Cross of the Iron Cross
- Other work: Journalist

Irnfried Freiherr von Wechmar (12 February 1899 – 27 November 1959) was a highly decorated Oberst in the Wehrmacht during World War II and an Oberst der Reserve in the Bundeswehr. He was also a recipient of the Knight's Cross of the Iron Cross.

== Awards and decorations ==
- Iron Cross (1914)
  - 2nd Class
  - 1st Class
- Honour Cross of the World War 1914/1918
- Iron Cross (1939)
  - 2nd Class
  - 1st Class
- German Cross in Gold (16 January 1942)
- Knight's Cross of the Iron Cross on 13 April 1941 as Oberstleutnant and commander of Aufklärungs-Abteilung 3
- Knight of Honor of the Order of Saint John
- Italian silver medal "Al valore militare" (1942)
