= Klaus Scharioth =

German diplomat (1946–2025)

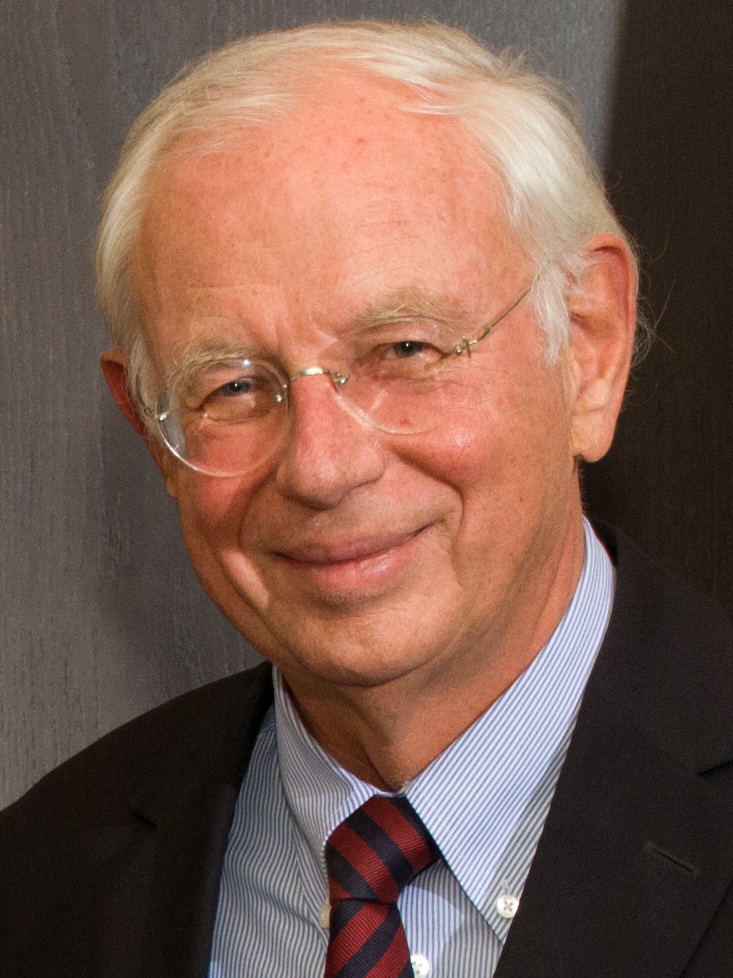
Klaus Scharioth (2009)

Klaus Scharioth (8 October 1946 – 30 October 2025) was a German diplomat. From 2006 to 2011 he served as Germany's ambassador to the United States. From 2011 he was dean of the Mercator Fellowship on International Affairs. He was also a Professor of Practice at the Fletcher School at Tufts University and a commentator on relations between Germany and the United States.

== Background ==
Scharioth was born in Essen, located in the Ruhr Area in western Germany. He studied law in Bonn, Freiburg and Geneva and political science, sociology and psychology at The College of Idaho in Caldwell, Idaho. He was also a graduate of the Fletcher School, where he studied international relations, international law and international economics and received an MA, an MALD and his PhD.

Scharioth was married with three children. He died on 30 October 2025, at the age of 79.

== Diplomatic service ==
His first posts were in Quito, Ecuador (1979–1982) and at West Germany's Permanent Mission to the United Nations in New York City (1986–1990). In the German Ministry of Foreign Affairs itself, he has served in the Asia, press and State Secretary's offices (1977–79), in the policy planning staff (1982–1986), and in the international law division (1990–1993).

Scharioth was Director of the Private Office to the NATO Secretaries General Manfred Woerner, Willy Claes and Javier Solana in Brussels, Belgium, from 1993 to 1996. In the Foreign Ministry he thereafter held posts as Head of the Defense and Security Policy Division (1996–1997), and as Head of the International Security and North America Directorate (1998–1999). Klaus Scharioth was appointed Head of the Office of Foreign Minister Klaus Kinkel in 1998. Under Joschka Fischer Scharioth became Political Director (1999–2002) before serving as State Secretary of the German Foreign Office from 2002 to 2006.

Scharioth presented his ambassadorial credentials to George W. Bush on 13 March 2006. In August 2011 he was succeeded by Peter Ammon.

== Other activities ==
- Jewish Museum, Berlin, Chairman of the Board of Trustees

== Honors ==
Scharioth received honorary doctoral degrees from the College of Idaho, Chatham University and Old Dominion University. He has received Estonia's Order of the Cross of Terra Mariana (Class II) and the Order of Merit of the Federal Republic of Germany.
