= Jürgen Chrobog =

German jurist and diplomat (1940–2026)

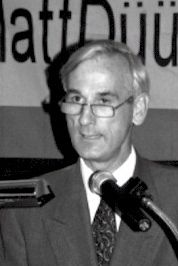
- Jürgen Chrobog in 1995
- Born: 28 February 1940; Berlin, Nazi Germany
- Died: 16 November 2026 (aged 86); Berlin, Germany
- Occupations: Lawyer, diplomat
- Spouse: Magda Gohar-Chrobog
- Children: 3

Jürgen Chrobog (28 February 1940 – 16 November 2026) was a German lawyer and diplomat. He worked in the Foreign Office of West Germany and the reunified Germany and among other diplomatic postings, was Ambassador to the United States from 1995 to 2001.

== Life and career ==
Chrobog was born in Berlin on 28 February 1940. He studied law in the 1960s in Freiburg im Breisgau, Göttingen, and Aix-en-Provence and then worked as an attorney in Hannover. In 1972, he joined the diplomatic service of the Federal Republic of Germany, which he served in the United Nations in New York.

From 1973 to 1977 he worked in the German Foreign Office under foreign ministers Walter Scheel and Hans-Dietrich Genscher, where he was responsible for European issues as well as the Third World. In 1977, he was dispatched to Singapore, and in 1980, to the European Union headquarters in Brussels.

From 1984 to 1991, Chrobog was the head of the press division as well as the spokesperson for the Foreign Office, and beginning in 1988, directed Genscher's ministerial office. From 1995 to 2001, he was the German ambassador to the United States. After this posting, he returned to Berlin as State Secretary of the German Federal Foreign Office, under foreign minister Joschka Fischer.

He represented West Germany at the 2+4 negotiations with East Germany and the four victorious powers of World War II (the United States, the Soviet Union, the United Kingdom, and France) concerning the reunification of Germany and its future as a NATO member, and referred to those negotiations in a meeting of the directors of the US, UK, French, and German foreign ministries in Bonn. After the meeting of the political directors of the US, British, French and German foreign ministries in Bonn on 6 March 1991, Chrobog wrote: “We made it clear in the two-plus-four negotiations that we would not take NATO beyond the Elbe stretch. We can therefore not offer Poland and the others NATO membership."

In 2003, as undersecretary of state, Chrobog was responsible for dealing with the crisis provoked by the kidnapping of German tourists in Algeria.

Chrobog retired in 2005 and became chairman of the supervisory board at the BMW Foundation Herbert Quandt. In late December that year, he and his family were abducted while traveling on vacation in eastern Yemen; they were released on 31 December.

He and his wife, Magda Gohar-Chrobog, had three sons. Chrobog died in Berlin on 16 November 2026, at the age of 86.

== See also ==
- List of kidnappings
- List of solved missing person cases (2000s)
