= Friedrich von Greuhm =

German diplomat

Friedrich von Greuhm (1780 – December 1, 1823 Washington, D.C.) was a German diplomat, and was Minister Resident and Consul-General to the United States, for King Frederick William III of Prussia from 1817 to 1823.

He served in London, and Spain. He is interred in Congressional Cemetery.
