= Jürgen Ruhfus =

German lawyer, diplomat, and Secretary of State

Jürgen Ruhfus (4 August 1930 Bochum – 25 February 2018) was a German jurist, diplomat, West German ambassador to the United Kingdom, later ambassador to the United States, and German secretary of state.

== Life and career ==
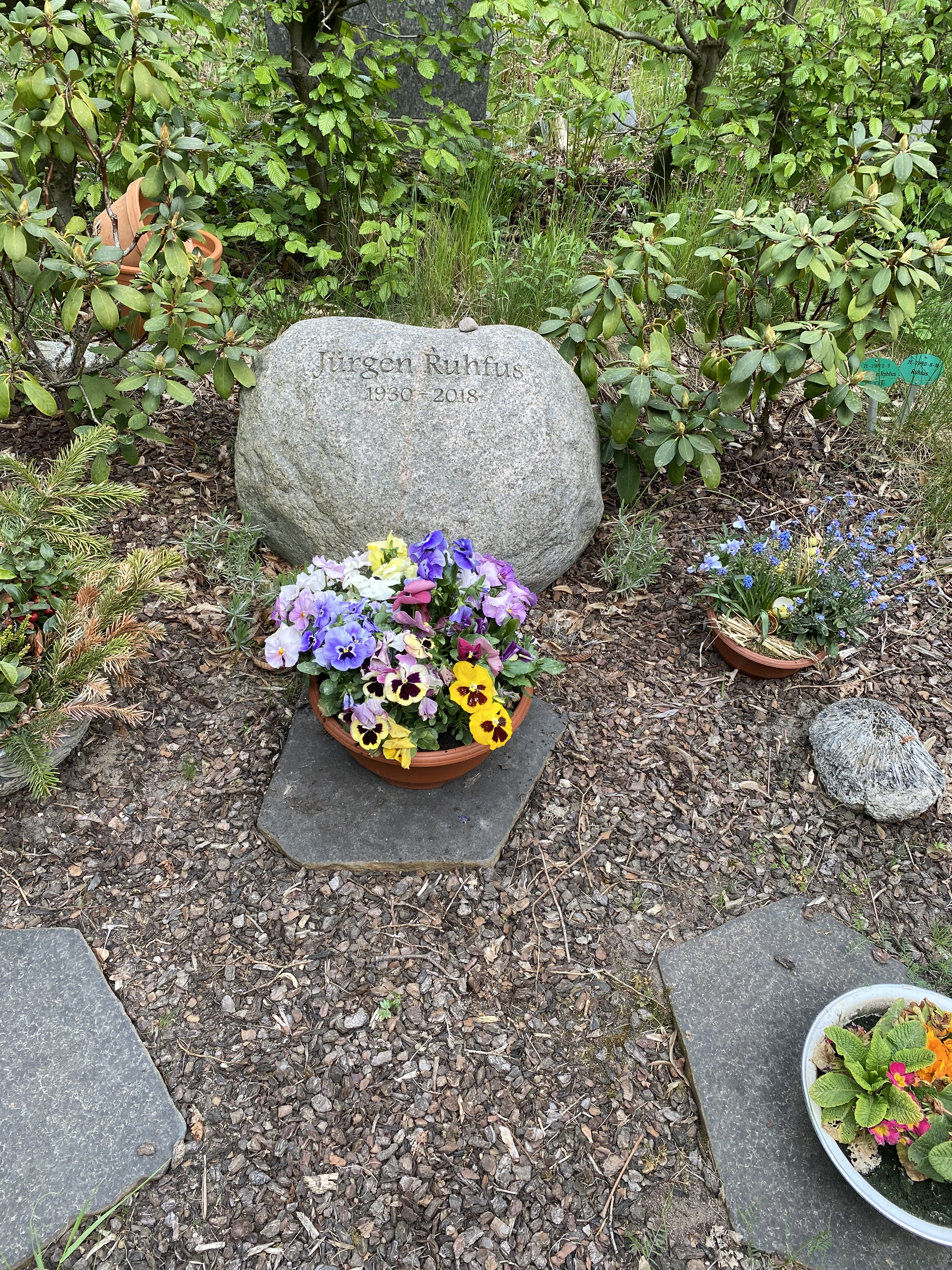
Grave of Jürgen Ruhfus at Steglitz Cemetery (Friedhof Steglitz)

Ruhfus, the son of an engineer, studied law and economics in Munich and Münster, and also spent time as an exchange student in Denver, Colorado. In 1950, he joined the political party Christian Democratic Union (CDU). After passing his first state exam (Staatsexamen) in 1955, Rufus became an attaché in the Federal Foreign Office of West Germany and accompanied the Foreign Minister Heinrich von Brentano. In the meantime, he was vice consul at the West German consulate in Dakar before being promoted in 1959 within the Foreign Service.

From 1960, Ruhfus served as a counselor at the West German embassy in Athens. With the publication "The Constitutional Position of the Court of Belgium and the Federal Court", he earned a Doctor of Law in 1964. From 1964 to 1970, he worked at the press department of the Foreign Office and took over the management in 1966.

From 1970 to 1973, Ruhfus served as the first West German ambassador in Nairobi. He then returned to the Foreign Office, where he worked in international affairs and later became a department manager. In 1976, he was appointed head of the Department II of the Federal Chancellery. West German Chancellor Helmut Schmidt made him his adviser on Foreign Policy and Defence Affairs, making him one of Schmidt's closest confidants.

On 22 May 1978, Rufus was made an Honorary Knight Commander of the civil division of the Order of the British Empire (OBE) by Queen Elisabeth II, believed to be in recognition of his work as Schmidt's foreign policy officer and security advisor during Anglo-German cooperation in the response to the aircraft hijacking and subsequent GSG 9 rescue of Lufthansa Flight 181 in October 1977.

With the succession of Hans Hellmuth Ruete in 1980, Ruhfus became the West German ambassador in London. After a period of reorganization, he returned to the Foreign Office in 1983, where he was appointed permanent state secretary in July 1984. In November 1987, he re-entered the diplomatic service, succeeding Günther van Well as West German ambassador in Washington. He held this office until the end of 1992 when he retired.

Ruhfus was chairman of the German-British Society (Deutsch-Englische Gesellschaft), and served on the advisory board of the German-American Heritage Foundation of the USA. Between 1992 and 2001, he was a member of the supervisory board of the German automobile manufacturer Adam Opel AG.

Jürgen Ruhfus was married and had three daughters.

== Honors and awards ==
- 1978: Honorary Knight Commander of the Order of the British Empire (OBE)
- 1983: Cross of Merit 1st Class of the Order of Merit of the Federal Republic of Germany
- 1987: Great Cross of Merit with Star of the Order of Merit of the Federal Republic of Germany

== Works ==
- Die staatsrechtliche Stellung des Rechnungshofs von Belgien und des Bundesrechnungshofs, Rechts- u. staatswissenschaftliche Fakultät, Münster, 1964
- Aufwärts. Erlebnisse und Erinnerungen eines diplomatischen Zeitzeugen 1955 bis 1992, EOS-Verlag, St. Ottilien, 2006, ISBN 3-8306-7202-0
