= Embassy of Germany, Washington, D.C. =

Embassy of Germany, Washington, D.C. Deutsche Botschaft, Washington, D.C.
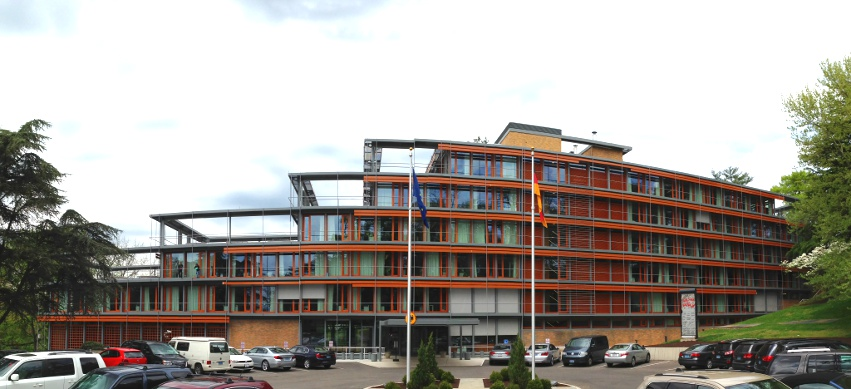
- chancery of the German embassy in Washington, D.C.
- Location: Washington, D.C.
- Address: 4645 Reservoir Road NW
- Ambassador: Jens Hanefeld
- Jurisdiction: United States
- Website: www.germany.info/us-en/embassy-consulates/embassy-washington

The Embassy of Germany in Washington, D.C., is the Federal Republic of Germany's diplomatic mission to the United States. Its chancery, designed by Egon Eiermann and opened in 1964, is located in northwest Washington, D.C. From August 2023 to August 2025, the German ambassador to the United States was Andreas Michaelis. Jens Hanefeld is his successor.

== History ==
=== Early period ===
Germany and the United States first established diplomatic relations in 1871, the year of the establishment of the German Empire.

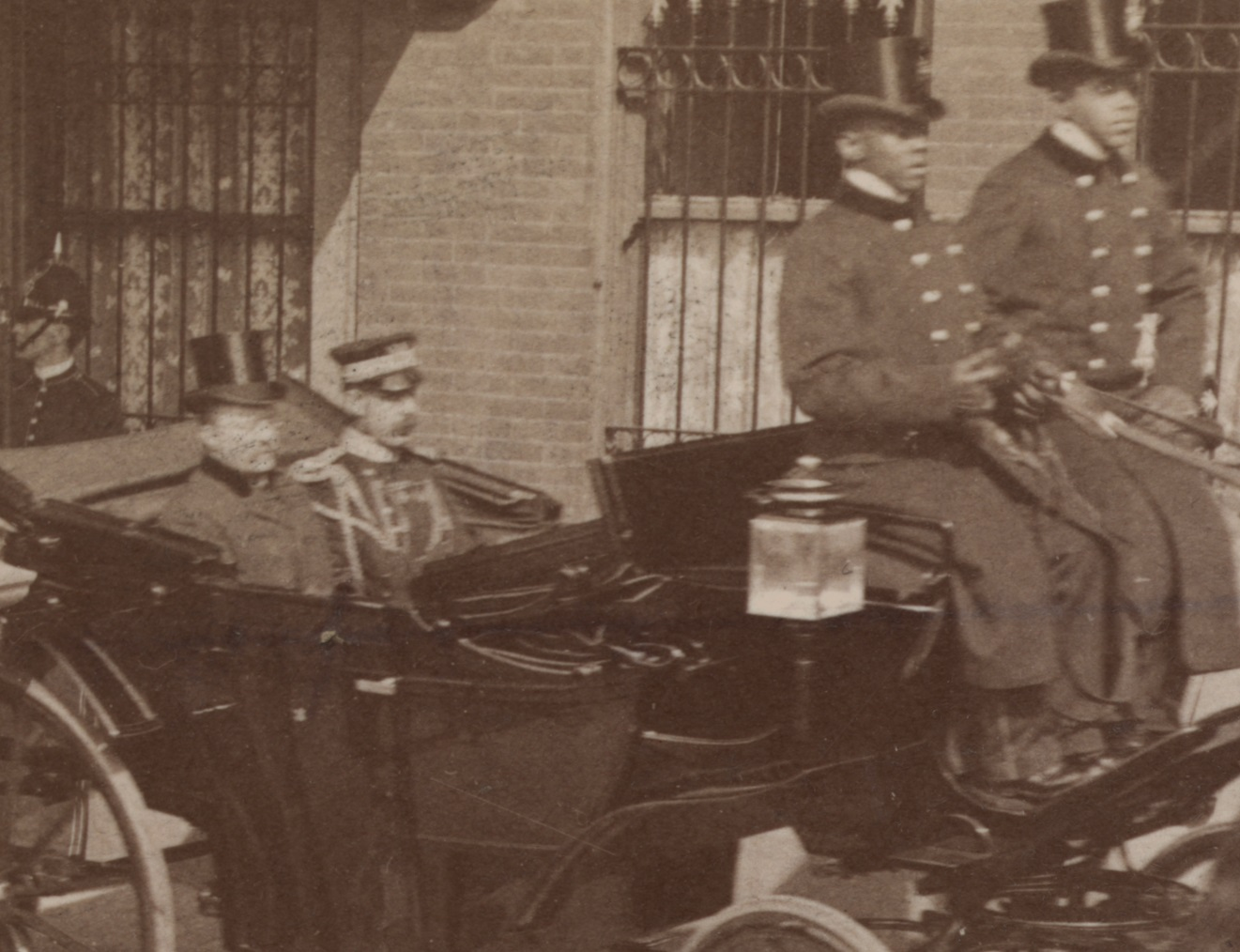
Theodore Roosevelt and aide de camp Col. Bingham depart the chancery of the German embassy in the presidential state coach following a return visit to Prince Henry of Prussia in 1902.

In 1894 the German embassy occupied a new chancery at 1435 Massachusetts Avenue. That building, constructed in 1873 as a private residence on a design by Adolf Cluss, was subsequently expanded to include 70 rooms, and would be occupied by Germany – with wartime interruptions – for nearly 50 years. The opening of the embassy was marked by a formal ball attended by 500 members of the Washington diplomatic corps, along with several members of the United States Congress and Chief Justice of the United States Melville Fuller. Music was provided by a detachment of the United States Marine Band. In this early period the embassy also hosted the return visit of President of the United States Theodore Roosevelt to Prince Henry of Prussia during the prince's official visit to the United States in 1902.

During the years prior to American entry into World War I, Franz von Papen was posted at the embassy as a military attaché, though was ultimately declared persona non grata by the U.S. government as a result of suspected espionage. In February 1917 the United States terminated diplomatic relations with Germany. Staff of the embassy were returned their passports by the U.S. government and departed for Germany shortly thereafter.

Following the conclusion of World War I, in 1921, Germany reestablished diplomatic relations with the United States and the German embassy reoccupied its former chancery.

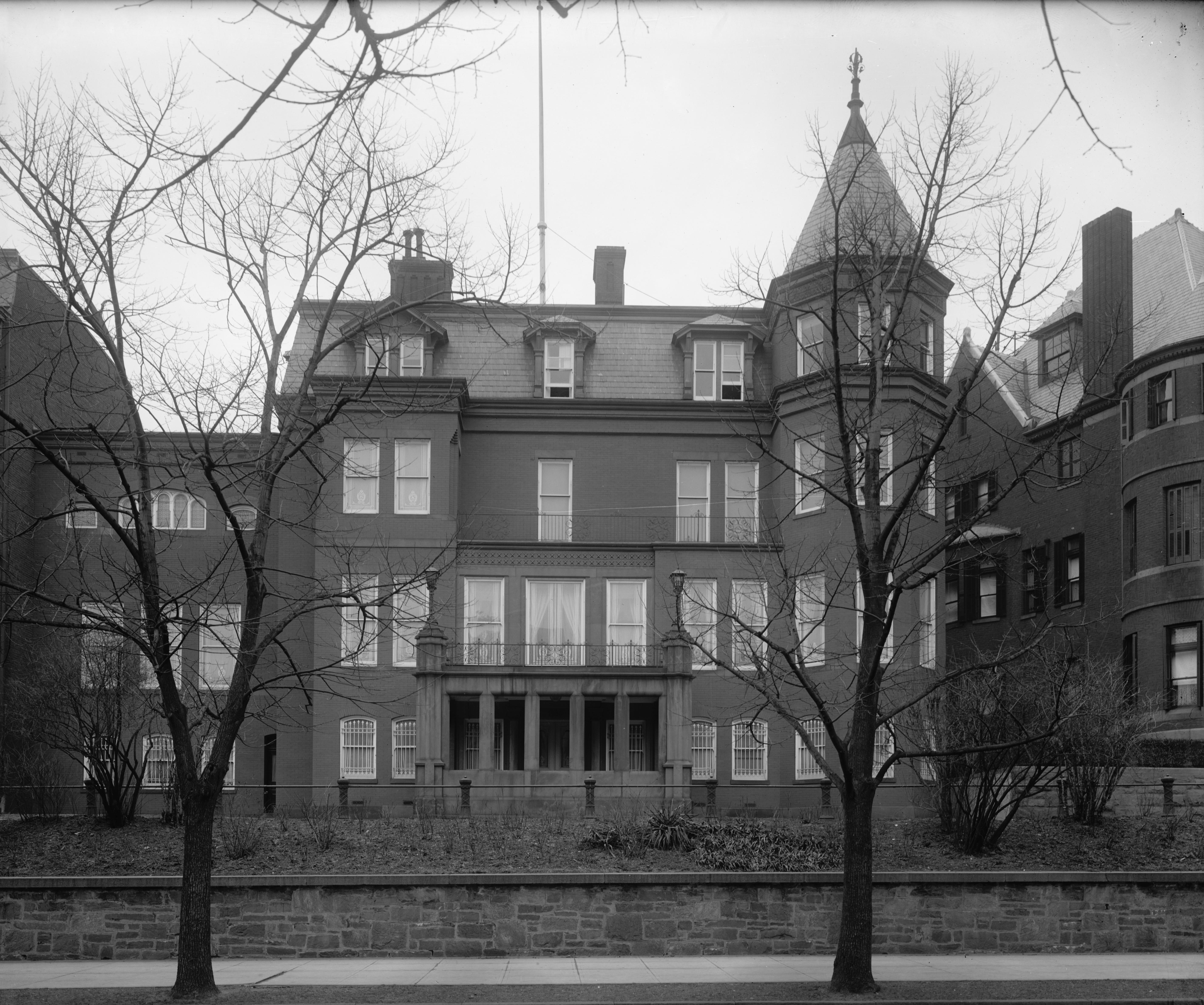
The Massachusetts Avenue chancery of the German embassy pictured in the early 20th century.

In the spring of 1938 the Nazi regime approved plans for construction of a new chancery. Construction, however, was ultimately sidetracked by the war in Europe.

=== 1941 San Francisco incident ===
A serious diplomatic incident occurred in January 1941 when U.S. Navy sailors Edward Lackey and Harold Sturtevant, both on leave from the psychiatric ward of the Navy's Mare Island Hospital where they had been treated for sleep walking, scaled a fire escape, tore down the flag from the German consulate in San Francisco and destroyed it. According to the sailors, they were unaware the building at which the flag was being flown was the German consulate. In his memoirs, consul Fritz Wiedemann, who witnessed the incident, recalled it as "both surreal and comical". The U.S. government issued an apology to Nazi Germany. The two sailors were briefly jailed and dismissed from military service, though following the onset of war with Germany they were pardoned and allowed to reenlist.

=== World War II ===
Ambassador Hans-Heinrich Dieckhoff is photographed by journalists leaving a meeting at the U.S. State Department in 1938.

On December 12, 1941 – following Germany's declaration of war against the United States – Switzerland assumed the role of protecting power of Germany in the United States and took custody of the chancery of the German embassy; staff were, meanwhile, interned at the Greenbrier until an exchange of diplomats was arranged the following year. The German diplomats sailed to the exchange point in Lisbon.

During World War II, Switzerland used parts of the chancery to house its own staff, thereby alleviating a housing shortage for Swiss diplomatic personnel in the United States. Following the German military surrender in May 1945, Switzerland acknowledged the extinction of the German state and declared itself absolved of protecting responsibilities. The chancery of the embassy was surrendered by Switzerland to the United States government as trustee of the Allied Control Council that month. Upon receiving custody of the building, the United States government removed all documents and files that had been left behind by the German delegation and held them until 1950, at which point they were given to the then newly established West German government.

=== Post-War ===
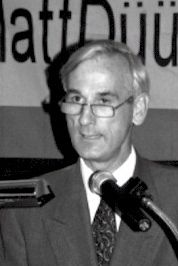
Jürgen Chrobog was German ambassador to the United States in the early 2000s.

The furnishings of the former German chancery were sold at auction by the U.S. government in 1948, fetching slightly less than $50,000. The chancery was auctioned by the U.S. government in 1951. Morris Cafritz was the high bidder, however, the government subsequently rejected his bid as too low. It was thereafter sold by the U.S. government to James S. Kerwin for $165,000. United States Senator William Langer opposed the sale, saying the site should be held in trust by the U.S. government for the future use of Germany. Four years later, the property was razed and turned into a parking garage. In 1955 the United States established diplomatic relations with West Germany. The United States awarded the Federal Republic of Germany $300,000 from the earlier sale of the chancery and its furnishings, and a new chancery was occupied in Foxhall that year. The facility was constructed in a modern style and featured modern interior decor as, according to German diplomats at the time, the country "has no antiques now".

== East German representation ==
The German Democratic Republic (GDR) and the United States began full diplomatic relations in 1974. The GDR maintained an embassy in a leased office space on Massachusetts Avenue near Dupont Circle. (Note: The East German embassy was located at 1717 Massachusetts Avenue NW on the eighth floor.)

In 1990, the office space was abandoned mid-lease upon the reunification of the Federal Republic of Germany (FRG) and the GDR. Although the FRG agreed to assume all debts and obligations of the former East Germany, the landlord's attorney later wrote that "without disclosing any confidences, I can say that our client did not necessarily find the Federal Republic and its embassy entirely consistent in its public and private positions".

== Facilities ==
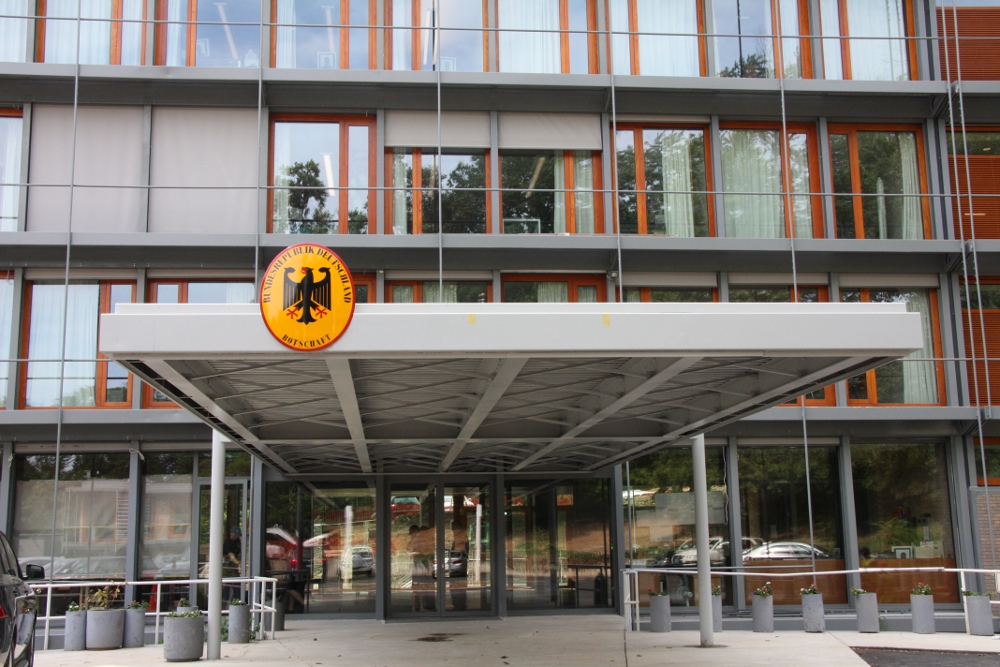
The entrance of the German chancery pictured in 2014.

=== Chancery ===
West Germany, along with Denmark and Switzerland, was a trailblazer in the use of modern architecture for diplomatic facilities in Washington. In 1964 it opened its new and current chancery, designed by Egon Eiermann. The building's design evoked the Bauhaus school and "was meant as a disavowal" of the Nazi architecture of Albert Speer.

The chancery building and consular building underwent a $46.5 million renovation that was completed in 2014.

=== Residence ===
The residence is located on the grounds of the chancery. It was constructed in 1994 from a design by O.M. Ungers, who aimed to "find an architectonic expression for the residence of the German ambassador that would be associative of the characteristics" of Germany.

The Washington Post has called the residence "one of the most conspicuous diplomatic pads in town" and, in 2015, described it as "a Bauhaus-inspired take on classical Washington" that did not appear dated, even more than two decades after it was built.

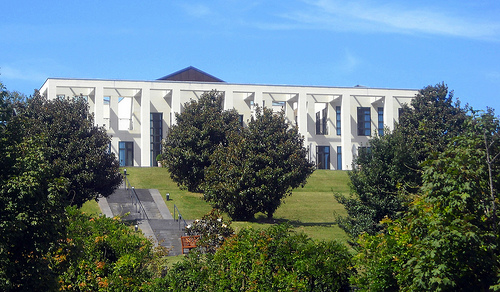
The residence, pictured in 2008.

The entrance hall contains two paintings by Gerhard Merz as well as a series of woodcuts on canvas by Markus Lüpertz. The dining room contains paintings by Bernard Schultze and a red lacquered partition/folding screen by Simon Ungers. The ladies' sitting room has an olive green- and brown-colored carpet by Rosemarie Trockel, while the gentlemen's sitting room contains paintings by Christa Näher of the four classical elements.

== Consulates ==
Germany maintains consulates general in Atlanta, Boston, Chicago, Houston, Los Angeles, Miami, New York, and San Francisco. There are honorary consuls in more than a dozen U.S. cities.

== See also ==
- Embassy of the United States, Berlin
- United States Ambassador to Germany
