= Hans-Heinrich Dieckhoff =

German diplomat

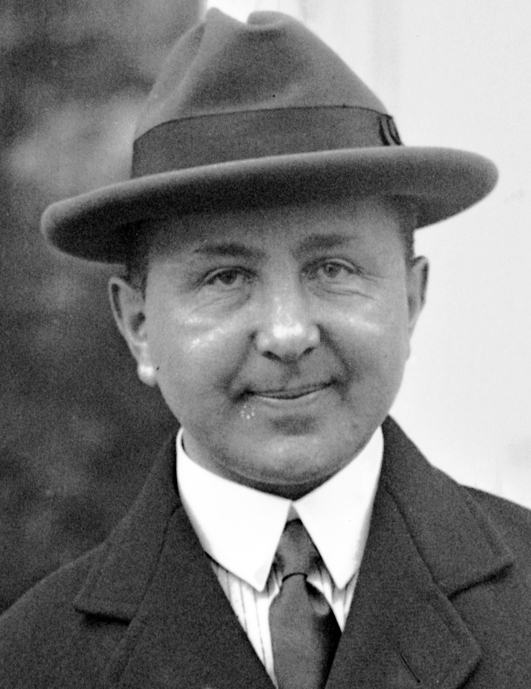
Hans-Heinrich Dieckhoff in 1924

Hans-Heinrich Dieckhoff (23 December 1884 – 21 March 1952) was a German diplomat best known for his service to the Nazi regime.

Dieckhoff was born in Strasbourg, Alsace-Lorraine. From 1937 to November 1938 he served as German ambassador to the United States, until recalled in response to the American recall of its ambassador in protest over the Kristallnacht. He was the last to occupy the post until after the war. In 1943 he assumed the post of ambassador to Spain.

Dieckhoff was interrogated after the war and was called to testify at the Nuremberg trials, but he was never formally charged with any crime. During his American posting he was involved in the controversy over the German American Bund relaying an order from the German government that German nationals were not to be associated with the organization; and in 1938 he warned Adolf Hitler that President Roosevelt had taken an implacably hostile stance towards the Nazi government and was preparing for war against Germany.

Dieckhoff was related through marriage to Joachim von Ribbentrop, being the brother-in-law of Ribbentrop's sister.
