= Embassy of Ukraine, Berlin =

Embassy of Ukraine in Berlin
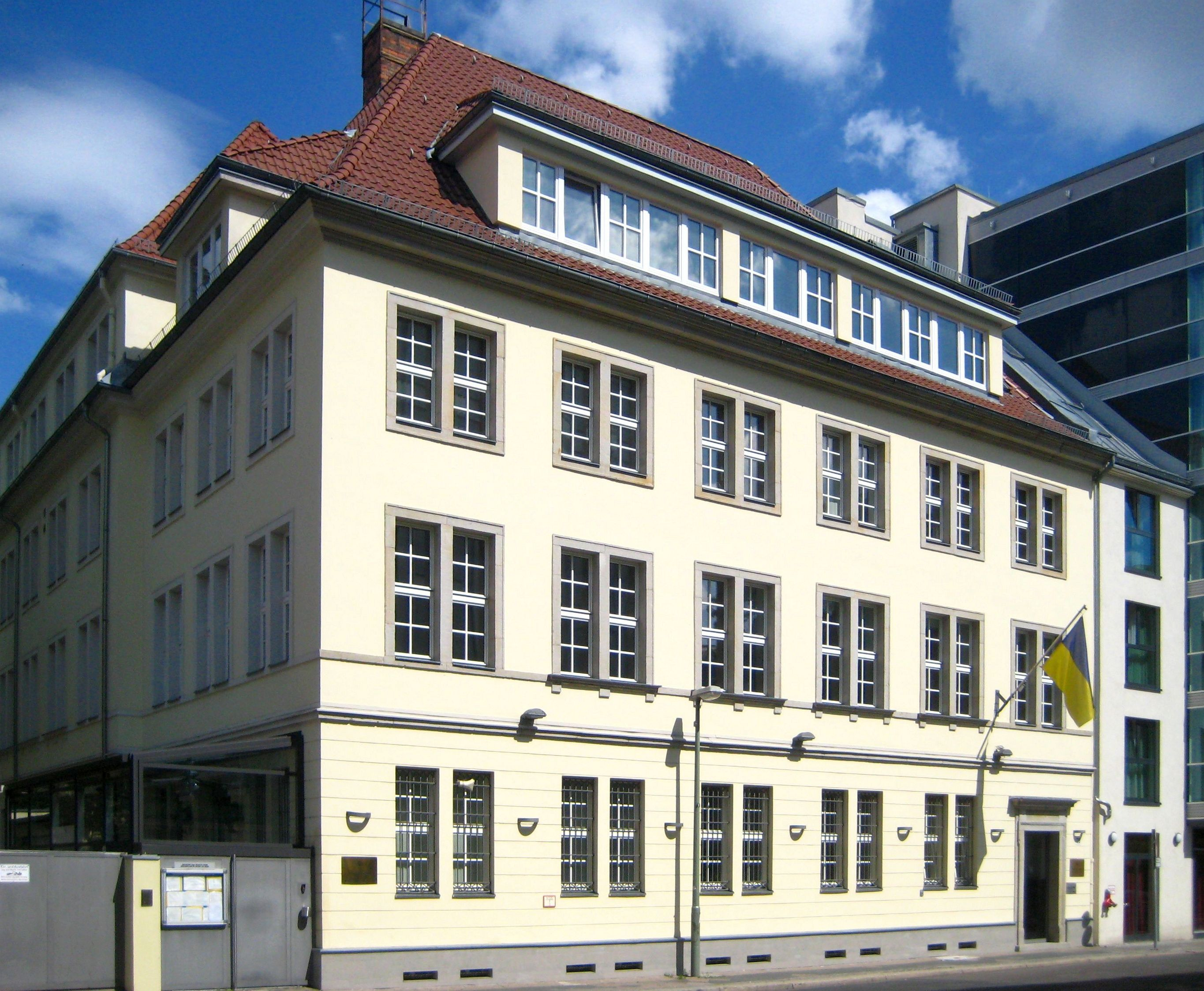
- Location: Berlin, Germany
- Address: Albrechtstrasse 26, 10117 Berlin-Mitte
- Coordinates: 52°31′26″N 13°23′01″E
- Opened: 1918, 1992
- Ambassador: Oleksii Makeiev

The Embassy of Ukraine in Berlin is the diplomatic mission of Ukraine in Germany. Since 23 September 2022, Oleksii Makeiev is the Ukrainian Ambassador to Germany.

== History ==
Germany recognised the independence of Ukraine on 26 December 1991. Diplomatic relations were established on 17 January 1992.

The main task of the Embassy of Ukraine in Berlin to represent the interests of Ukraine, promote the development of political, economic, cultural, scientific and other ties, as well as to protect the rights and interests of citizens and legal entities of Ukraine in Germany.

The embassy promotes the development of good-neighborly relations between Ukraine and the Federal Republic of Germany at all levels, to ensure the harmonious development of mutual relations, as well as cooperation on matters of mutual interest. The embassy also performs consular functions.

== Embassy building in Berlin ==
=== 1918–1923 ===
The Ukrainian People's Republic, which German empire recognized on 9 February 1918, as an independent, acquired the premises under the embassy in Berlin.

On 17 March 1918, the UPR sent a temporary representative of the UPR to the German state. Firstly, this position was taken by Oleksandr Sevryuk, then Omelyan Koziy.

On 1 July 1918, first ambassador of the Ukrainian state in the German Empire Teodor Shteingel arrived to Berlin. In 1919, Mykola Porsh became an Ambassador. In 1921, Roman Smal-Stocki replaced him.

On 6 February 1923, the Embassy of the UPR in Berlin was closed.

==== Embassy structure in 1918–1923 ====
- Diplomatic Department
- Economic Department
- Office
- Consular Department
- Information Department

=== Since 1992 ===
The headquarters of the embassy is the former administrative building of the municipal gas works in Berlin-Mitte. It was erected in 1910 by Ludwig Hoffmann and rebuilt by Turning in 1992. It is listed as part of the ensemble Friedrich Wilhelm city.

==== Embassy structure since 1992 ====
- Ambassador
- Minister Counsellor
- Counselor
- First Secretary
- Third Secretary
- Attaché
- Branch of the Embassy of Ukraine in Bonn

==== Trade and economic mission ====
- TEM Head, Minister Counsellor
- Deputy TEM Head and Secretary
- Expert TEM

==== Military attaché ====
- Attaché on defense issues
- Military attaché
- Airborne, Naval Attaché

== Consulates ==
- Consular Section of the Embassy of Ukraine in Berlin, (Albrecht Strasse 26, Berlin-Mitte)
- Branch of the Ukrainian Embassy in Bonn (Rheinhöhenweg 101, Remagen-Oberwinter)
- Consulate General of Ukraine in Hamburg (Mundsburger Damm 1, Hamburg)
- Consulate General of Ukraine in Frankfurt (Vilbeler Strasse 29, Frankfurt am Main)
- Consulate General of Ukraine in Munich (Riedenburger Str. 2, Munich)

== Previous ambassadors ==
1. Teodor Shteingel (1918)
2. Mykola Porsh (1918–1920)
3. Roman Smal-Stocki (1920–1923)
4. Mykola von Wassilko (1923)
5. Ivan Piskowyi (6 March 1992, to 7 June 1994)
6. Yurii V. Kostenko (28 December 1994, to 2 September 1997)
7. Anatoly Ponomarenko (2 September 1997, to 26 November 2003)
8. Serhiy Farenyk (28 November 2003, to 26 July 2005)
9. Ihor Dolhov (9 December 2005, to 4 April 2008)
10. Natalia Zarudna (4 September 2008, to 16 December 2011)
11. Pavlo Klimkin (22 June 2012, to 19 June 2014)
12. Andriy Melnyk (20 December 2014 to 9 July 2022)
13. Oleksii Makeiev (from 23 September 2022)

== See also ==
- Germany-Ukraine relations
- Ambassador of Ukraine to Germany
- Embassy of Germany in Kyiv
- List of diplomatic missions in Germany
