= Germany–Ukraine relations =

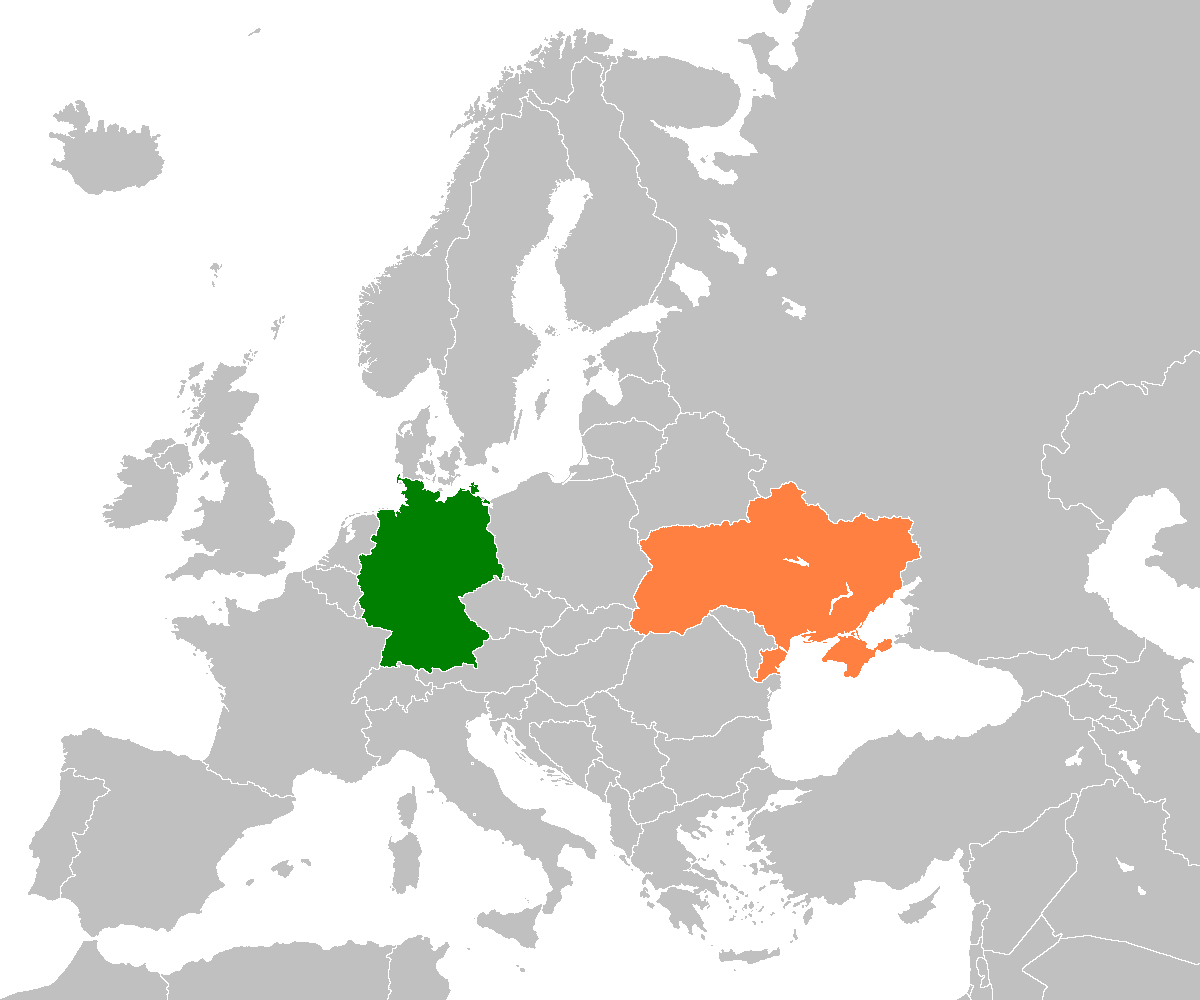

- Germany: Ukraine

Diplomatic mission
- Embassy of Germany, Kyiv: Embassy of Ukraine, Berlin

Envoy
- Ambassador Anka Feldhusen: Ambassador Oleksiy Makeyev

Germany–Ukraine relations are foreign relations between the Federal Republic of Germany and Ukraine. Diplomatic relations between Ukraine and Germany originally were established in 1918 as between Ukrainian People's Republic and German Empire, but were discontinued soon thereafter due to occupation of Ukraine by the Red Army. Current relations were resumed in 1989 at a consulate level, and in 1992 as full-scale diplomatic mission. Germany supports Ukraine's European Union and NATO membership, and helps it to grow a "strong, climate-friendly economy".

== History ==
=== 1918–1990 ===
In 1918, in the aftermath of the Brest-Litovsk Treaty, German troops provided military assistance to Ukraine against Soviet Russia. The German military administration was instrumental in Pavlo Skoropadskyi coup against the Ukrainian People's Republic (April 1918) and the establishment of the short-lived Ukrainian State. The first German Ambassador to Ukraine was Alfons Mumm von Schwarzenstein, whereas the first Ukrainian Ambassador to Germany was Oleksandr Sevriuk (as Chargé d'affaires) who was replaced with Teodor Shteingel.

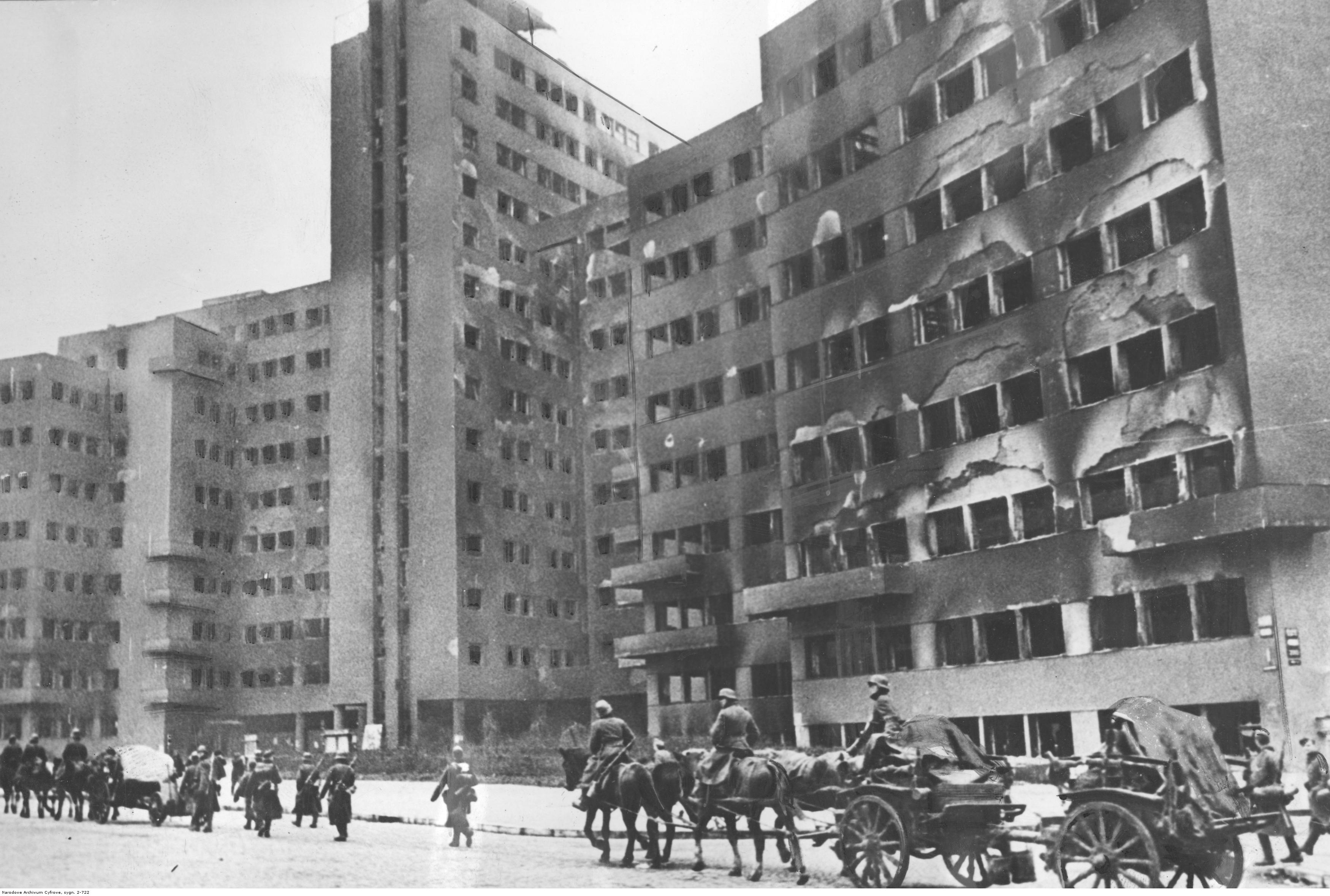
German troops entering Kharkiv in 1941

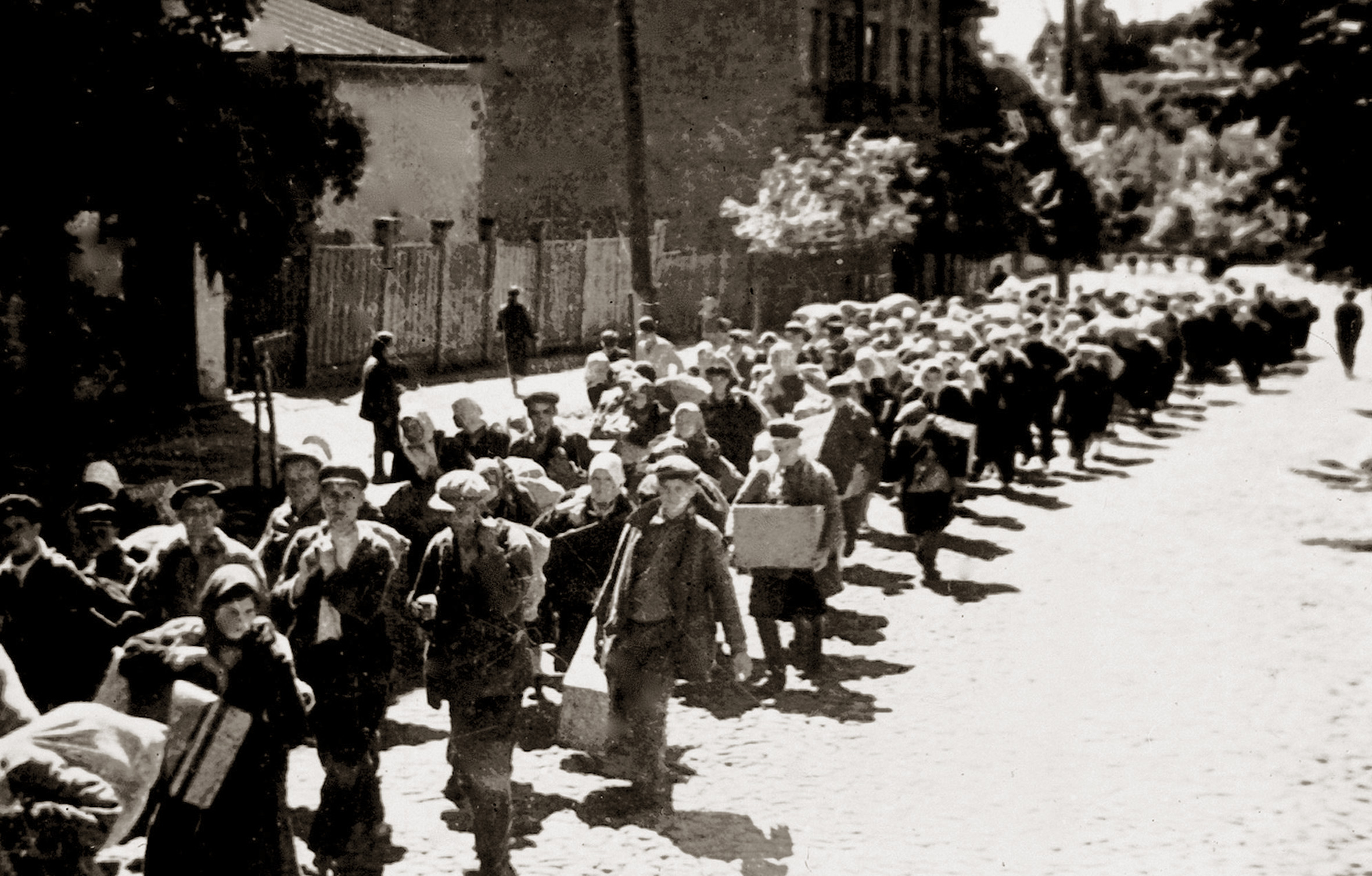
Ukrainian Ostarbeiters from Kyiv Oblast depart to Nazi Germany to serve as labor force, 1942

During World War II, German troops (with the help of Italians, Romanians, and Hungarians) occupied most of Soviet Ukraine (including Soviet-occupied southeastern Poland) from 1941 to 1944, portioning the territory between the General Government and Reichskommissariat Ukraine. OUN's Ukrainian Insurgent Army alternated between fighting the Germans and accepting their help against the Soviets. Herbert Backe formulated the Hunger Plan, intended to conduct large-scale confiscation of Ukrainian agricultural crops to feed the German military and civilians, and at the same time deliberately starve a sizeable portion of the Ukrainian population. Although it was not fully implemented, part of the population of Kyiv and Kharkiv was starved to death. The German Generalplan Ost anticipated mass expulsion of the population and German colonization in accordance with the Lebensraum policy.

Around 4.5 to 6 million Ukrainians fought in the Soviet Red Army against Nazi Germany, contributing significantly to the eventual Soviet victory. The Nazi occupation of Ukraine was marked by extreme brutality, especially towards Jews. Around 1.5 million Jews were murdered during the Holocaust in Ukraine, with atrocities such as the Babi Yar massacre, where tens of thousands of Jews were executed near Kyiv. Approximately 5.2 million Ukrainian civilians (of all ethnic groups) perished during World War II as a result of fighting, Nazi crimes, war-related diseases, and famine, amounting to more than 12% of Ukraine's population at the time.

Following the war, from 1944 to the 1950s, surviving OUN leaders found refuge in the US occupation zone of Germany, which became home to many Ukrainian displaced persons. In 1953, Radio Free Europe/Radio Liberty (then called "Radio Liberation") started its operations in Munich, broadcasting to Ukraine in Ukrainian language. In 1959, Stepan Bandera was killed in Munich by a Soviet agent.

=== 1990–2014 ===
In 1991, Germany opposed Ukrainian independence and the dissolution of the Soviet Union, according to archived German Foreign Ministry files released in 2022. In November 1991, facing the imminent dissolution of the Soviet Union, German Chancellor Helmut Kohl offered Russia to "exert influence on the Ukrainian leadership" for it to join a proposed confederation with Russia. Germany changed its stance only when Ukrainian independence became inevitable after the independence referendum held in December 1991, and then recognized Ukraine.

=== During the Russo-Ukrainian War (2014–present) ===
==== Merkel era ====
The German Wandel durch Handel (aka Ostpolitik) policy was dramatically shaken after 2014 as Russia threatened Ukraine, seized Crimea, and sponsored fighting in eastern Ukraine; Angela Merkel led the Normandy format discussions aimed at halting the invasion of Ukraine by Vladimir Putin. Germany stopped all sales of weapons to Ukraine, officially due to the long-standing policy of never sending weapons to conflict zones. Berlin denounced Moscow's actions as a violation of international law, and took a leadership role in formulating EU sanctions. However, Germany depended heavily on Russian energy supplies via the Nord Stream pipeline, so it proceeded cautiously and opposed American efforts to cancel Nord Stream.

Germany and France both exerted substantial influence in peace talks between Russia and Ukraine, and in February 2015 these resulted in a ceasefire known as the Minsk II agreement. In July 2015 Germany loaned 500mn euro to Ukraine to help rebuild eastern Ukraine's infrastructure.

In June 2016 Germany contributed euro 6mn to the United Nations World Food Programme (WFP) to continue to provide food assistance to more than 200,000 people affected by the conflict in eastern Ukraine.

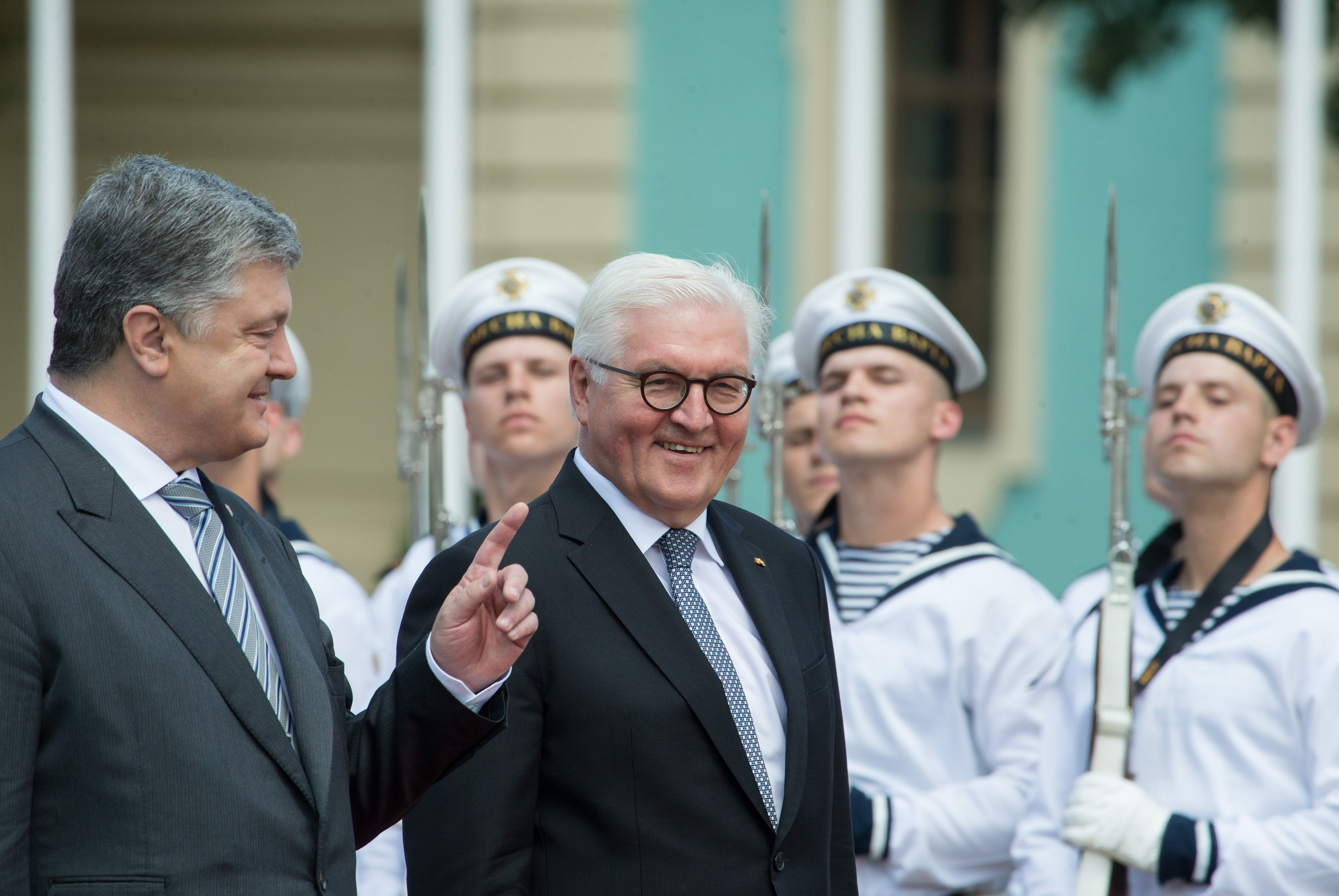
German President Frank-Walter Steinmeier with Ukrainian President Petro Poroshenko in Ukraine in May 2018

In July 2018, the planned Nord Stream 2 gas pipeline from Russia to Germany was opposed by Ukrainian President Petro Poroshenko.

As of 2019 Germany was reported to be the third-largest donor to Ukraine, after the US and EU. The German Foreign Ministry indicated that since 2014, Germany had contributed almost €1.2 billion of funding to Ukraine as well as another €200 million via EU contributions.

==== Scholz era ====
In December 2021 four days after Merkel had left office, Germany blocked arms supplies to Ukraine during the 2021–2022 Russo-Ukrainian crisis. In January 2022 after new chancellor Olaf Scholz had blocked an Estonian shipment of German-made arms to Ukraine, Ukraine's foreign minister Dmytro Kuleba criticised the German government for upholding the long-standing policy of not sending weapons into conflicted regions. Germany had stopped such exports to Ukraine in 2014. He stressed that while he respects Germany's reasoning for upholding their policy in reference to their past he "could not agree to it". Also in January, the German ambassador to Ukraine Anka Feldhusen was summoned to Ukraine's foreign ministry over comments by German navy chief Kay-Achim Schönbach; vice admiral Schönbach resigned as a result. Germany offered 5,000 helmets to Ukraine. The offer was ridiculed and the transfer was delayed. In February, Annalena Baerbock as a representative of Germany's foreign ministry requested German citizens to urgently leave Ukraine as Russia poised to invade Ukraine, Furthermore, after G7 meeting, she assured the united support by the group for Ukraine.

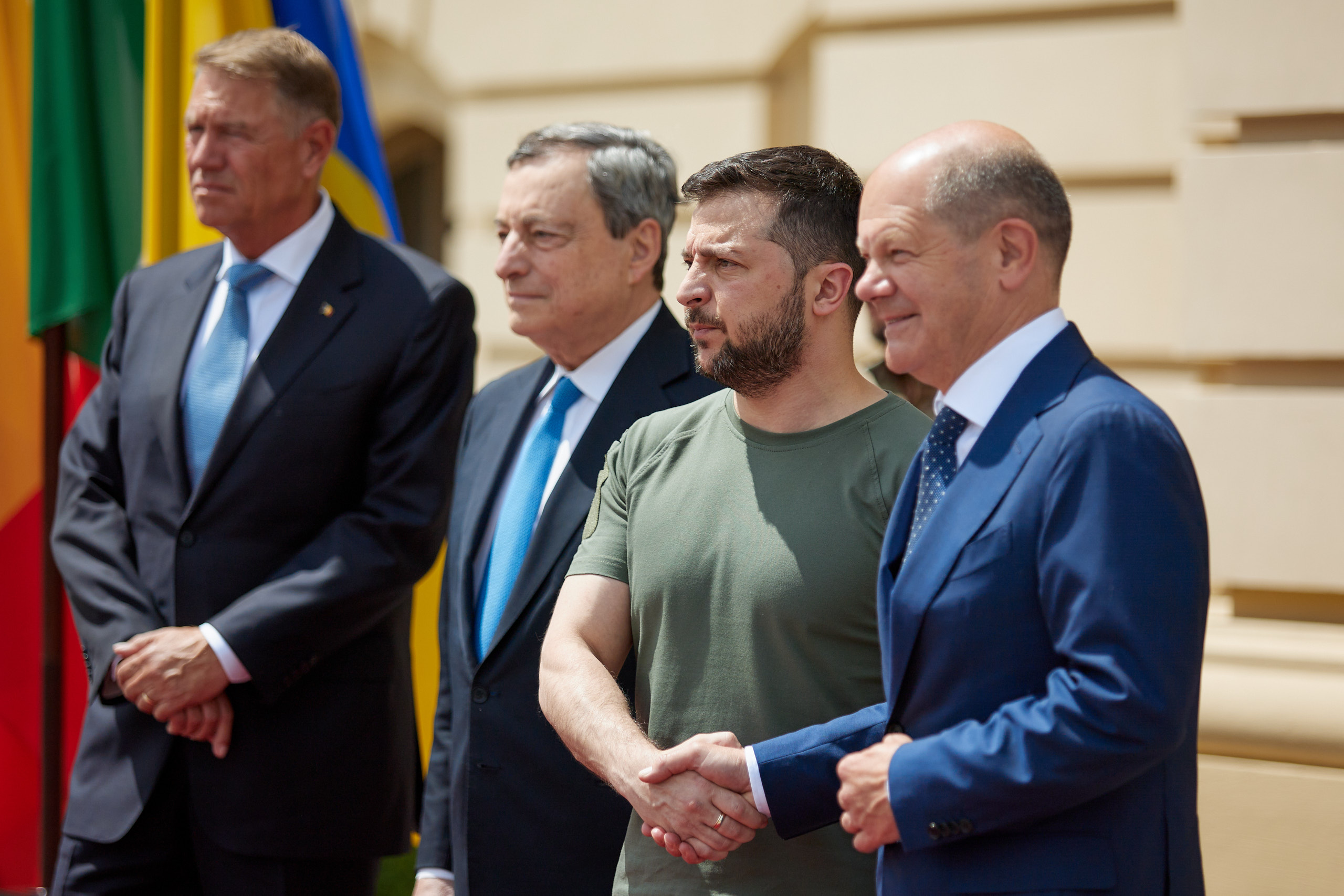
German Chancellor Olaf Scholz with Ukrainian President Volodymyr Zelenskyy in Kyiv, Ukraine, 16 June 2022

On February 26, 2022 (two days after the 2022 Russian invasion of Ukraine had begun) Germany abandoned a long-standing policy of never sending weapons to conflict zones; it increased its support for Ukraine's fight against Russia, approving arms transfers to Kyiv in a policy reversal and agreeing to block Moscow's access to the SWIFT interbank system. Germany has provided tens of billions of dollars in aid to Ukraine. In April 2022, Ukraine rejected a request for an official visit by German President Frank-Walter Steinmeier who is widely perceived in Ukraine as being pro-Russian owing to his support for Nord Stream 2 and past comments accusing NATO of "warmongering".

In April 2022, Germany committed to sending armored anti-aircraft systems and armored vehicles to Ukraine. The first three Flakpanzer Gepard arrived in Ukraine on 25 July 2022. Thirty Gepards were delivered until 20 September 2022. In May 2022, the German government committed to send seven PzH 2000 artillery pieces to Ukraine, with five more from the Dutch government. Ukrainian troops arrived in Germany five days later for training and the Ukrainian government subsequently placed an order to purchase a further 100 PzH 2000 howitzers from Germany. In January 2023, the German government resisted pressure from its NATO allies, especially the United States and Poland, to agree to provide Leopard 2 battle tanks to Ukraine, however it eventually agreed to send the tanks and also allowed Poland to send its Leopard 2 tanks.

==== Merz era ====
German Chacellor Friedrich Merz and Ukrainian Prime Mimister Serhii Koretskyi in October 2026

enacted during the transition between the end of the Scholz cabinet and the beginning of the Merz cabinet, Friedrich Merz announced that all range-based limitations on German weaponry delivered to Ukraine were removed, allowing for Ukraine to use German weaponry for long-range attacks on Russian soil. On 4 October 2026, Merz landed in Kyiv with Economy Minister Katherina Reiche, as Germany is expected to provide Ukraine with €1 billion military aid along with €350 million to repair the country's energy infrastructure.

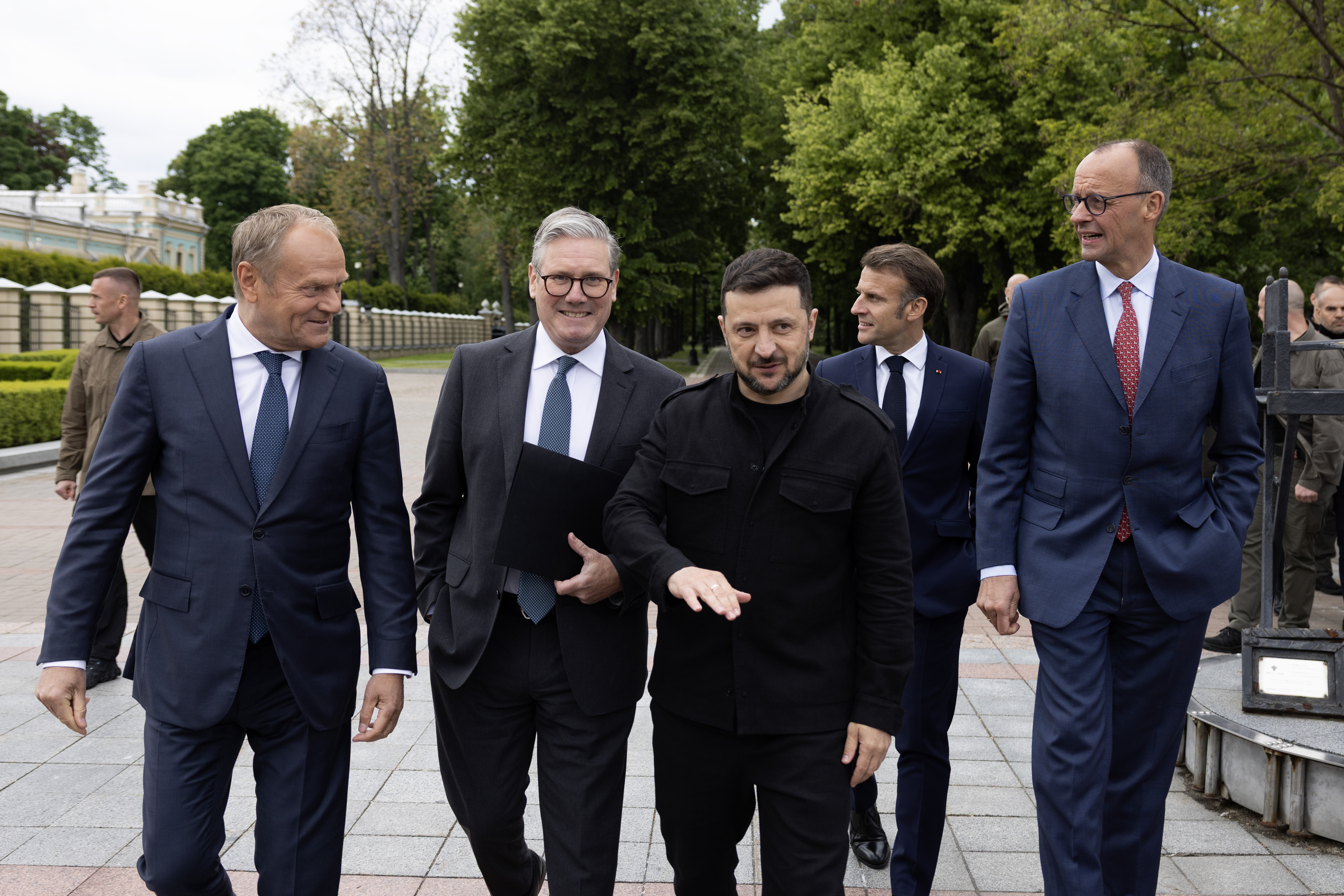
German Chancellor Friedrich Merz, French President Emmanuel Macron, British Prime Minister Keir Starmer and Prime Minister of Poland Donald Tusk with Ukrainian President Volodymyr Zelenskyy in Ukraine in May 2025

== Diplomatic missions location ==
Germany has an embassy in Kyiv and 1 Consulate-General in Donetsk (temporarily in Dnipro due to the War in Donbas).

Ukraine has an embassy in Berlin and 3 Consulates-General in Frankfurt, Hamburg and Munich.

=== Head of missions (1917–1920s) ===
Germany

- 1917–18 Alfons Mumm von Schwarzenstein
- 1918–19 Johannes (Hans) Graf von Berchem

Ukraine

- 1918–18 Oleksandr Sevriuk (chargé d'affaires)
- 1918–18 Omelian Koziy (chargé d'affaires)
- 1918–18 Teodor Shteingel
- 1919–20 Mykola Porsh
- 1921–23 Roman Smal-Stocki
- 1923–23 Nikolaus von Wassilko (chargé d'affaires)

Soviets (representative of the Soviet government in Ukraine)

- 1921–23 Voldemar Aussem

== Resident diplomatic missions ==
- Germany has an embassy in Kyiv.
- Ukraine has an embassy in Berlin and consulates-general in Frankfurt, Düsseldorf, Hamburg and Munich.
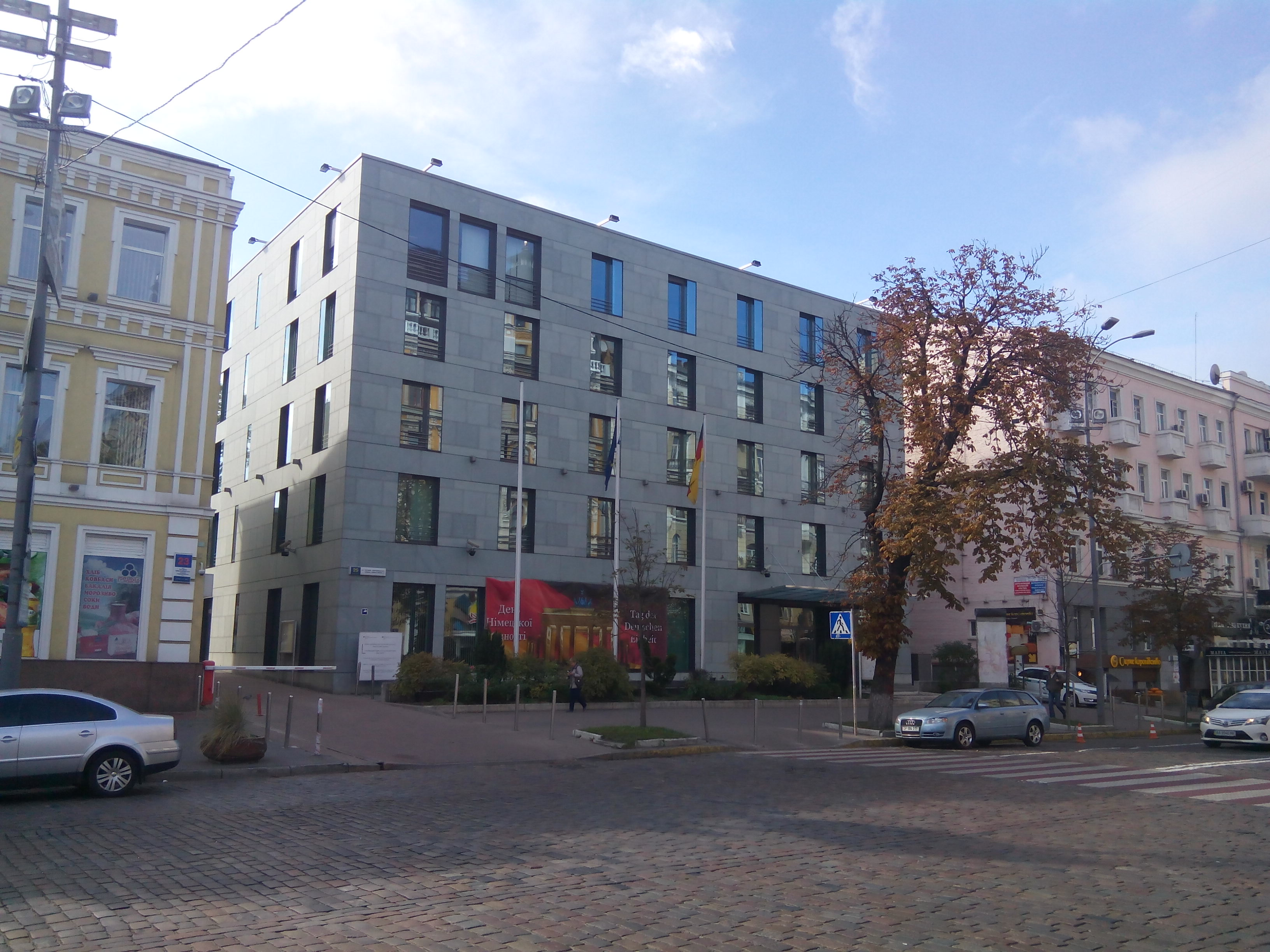
Embassy of Germany in Kyiv

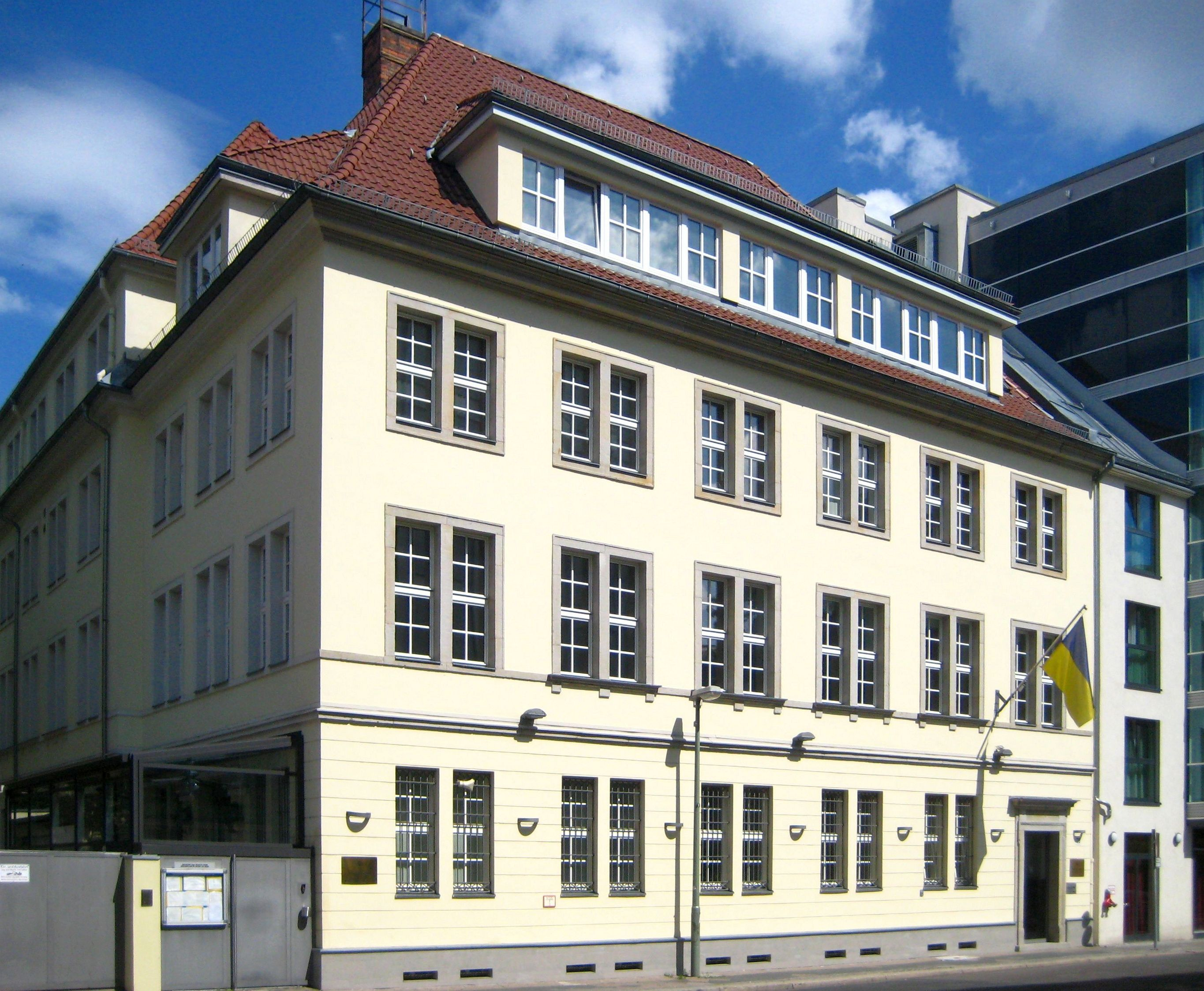
Embassy of Ukraine in Berlin

== See also ==
- Germans in Ukraine
- Gazprom
- Gerhard Schroeder
- Cold War, Cold War II
- Russo-Ukrainian War
  - Ukraine–EU relations, Ukrainians in Germany, Ukrainian diaspora
- Accession of Ukraine to the European Union
