= Andriy Melnyk (diplomat) =

Ukrainian diplomat and politician (born 1975)

- Андрій Мельник
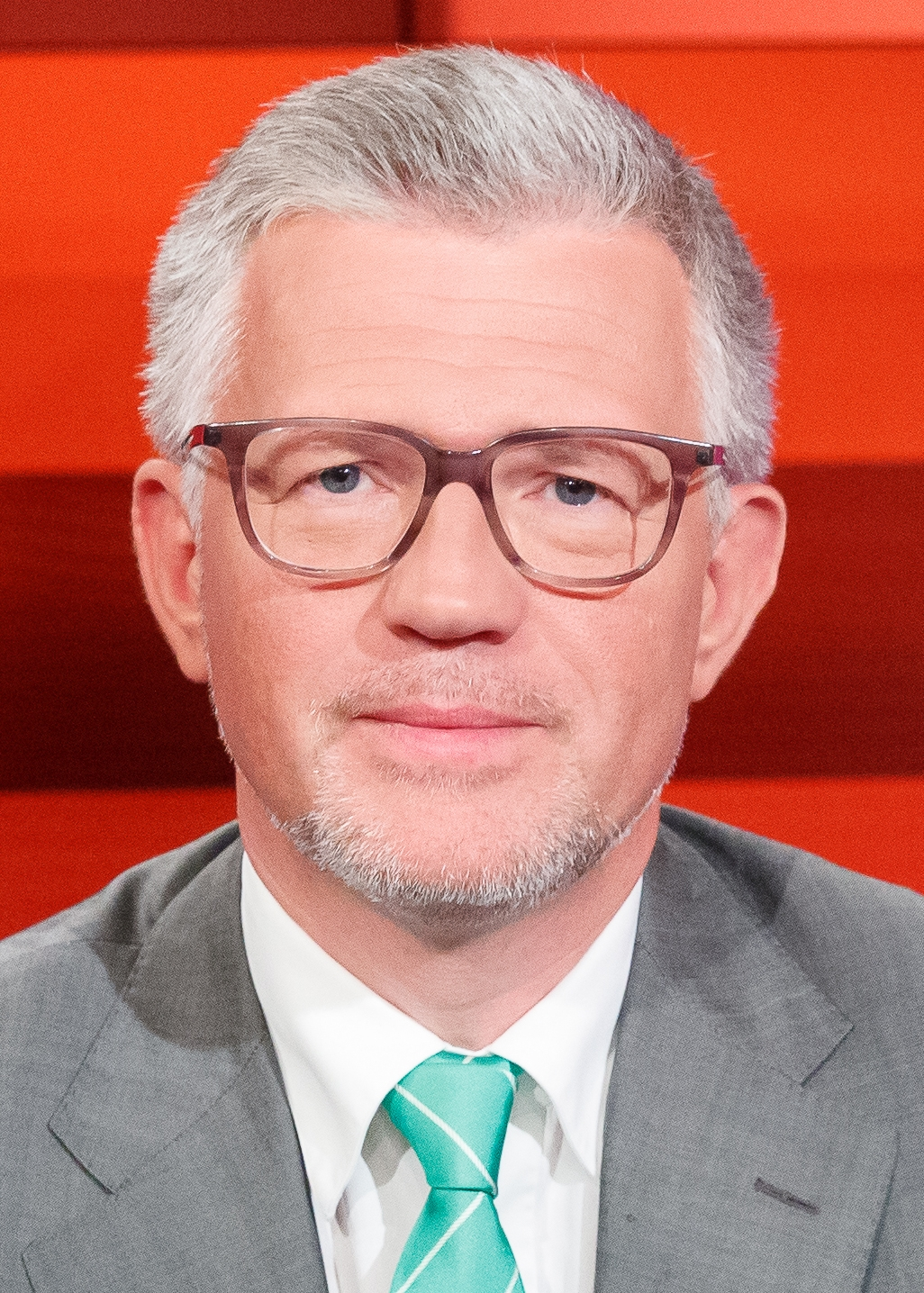
- Melnyk in 2022

Permanent Representative of Ukraine to the United Nations
- Incumbent
- Assumed office 21 December 2024
- Prime Minister: Denys Shmyhal
- Preceded by: Sergiy Kyslytsya

Ambassador of Ukraine to Brazil
- In office 20 June 2023 – 2025
- Succeeded by: Andriy Borodenkov (interim)

Deputy Minister of Foreign Affairs
- In office 18 November 2022 – 11 July 2023
- President: Volodymyr Zelenskyy
- Prime Minister: Denys Shmyhal

Ambassador of Ukraine to Germany
- In office 12 January 2015 – 14 October 2022
- President: Petro Poroshenko; Volodymyr Zelenskyy
- Preceded by: Pavlo Klimkin
- Succeeded by: Oleksiy Makeev

Personal details
- Born: 7 September 1975 (age 51) Lviv, Ukrainian SSR, Soviet Union
- Spouse: Svitlana Melnyk
- Children: 2
- Education: Lviv University
- Occupation: Lawyer; jurist; diplomat
- Profession: diplomat

Andriy Yaroslavovych Melnyk (Ukrainian: Андрій Ярославович Мельник, born 7 September 1975) is a Ukrainian diplomat who has served as the Ukrainian ambassador to the United Nations since May 2025. He previously was the Ukrainian ambassador to Brazil starting in June 2023. Before that, he held the position of deputy minister of foreign affairs from November 2022 to July 2023 and Ukrainian ambassador to Germany from December 2014 to October 2022.

He is a Doctor of Law.

== Early life and education ==
Andriy Melnyk was born in 1975 in Lviv, Ukrainian SSR, Soviet Union.

In 1997, he graduated from Ivan Franko Lviv State University, qualified as a specialist in international relations, translator of German. Then Melnyk studied in Sweden at the Faculty of Law of the University of Lund, where he received a master's degree in international law. He also interned at Harvard University. In 2004 he achieved a doctoral degree in international law from the Koretsky Institute of State and Law at the National Academy of Sciences of Ukraine in Kyiv.

== Diplomatic career ==
In 1997, he joined the diplomatic service as a senior consultant in the Foreign Policy Department of the Administration of the President of Ukraine.

In 1999–2003, Melnyk was second and then the first secretary of the Embassy of Ukraine in Austria; he left this Embassy in 2003.

Between 2005 and 2007, Andriy Melnyk worked as an advisor to Ukrainian President Viktor Yushchenko. He was Deputy Head of the Department of Bilateral and Regional Cooperation, Head of the Analysis and Planning Department of the Main Foreign Policy Service of the Secretariat of the President of Ukraine, Secretary of the Ukrainian part of the Advisory Committee of the Presidents of Ukraine and the Republic of Poland.

From 2007 till 2012, Melnyk was Consul of Ukraine in Hamburg. to 9 July 2022 He initiated the establishment of the Coordination Council of Ukrainian public organizations at the Consulate General: the Union of Ukrainian Students of Germany, the Association of Ukrainians of Northern Germany, the Society of Ukrainians of Germany. He was sworn into office in Germany on January 12, 2015.

Between 2012 and 2014, Andriy Melnyk worked at the Ministry of Foreign Affairs of Ukraine.

In March 2014 he was appointed Deputy Minister of the first Yatsenyuk Government responsible for European integration.

On 19 December 2014, Melnyk was appointed a Ukrainian ambassador to Germany by a decree of president Petro Poroshenko.

On 24 October 2022, diplomat Oleksiy Makeev officially succeeded Melnyk as the Ukrainian ambassador to Germany. On 19 November, Melnyk was appointed Deputy Foreign Minister of Ukraine.

Since June 20, 2023, he has served as the Ukrainian ambassador to Brazil.

=== 2022 invasion of Ukraine ===
==== Criticism of German government ====
As ambassador to Germany Melnyk was vocal in his criticism of what he considered Germany's insufficient support of Ukraine following the 2022 Russian invasion of Ukraine. After Germany's president Frank-Walter Steinmeier was uninvited to Ukraine due to his allegedly close links to Vladimir Putin, Germany's chancellor Olaf Scholz cancelled his visit to Ukraine. This prompted Melnyk to dub Scholz an offended liver sausage (German: beleidigte Leberwurst) in reference to a person who huffs from being too thin-skinned. Melnyk elaborated that this "is the most brutal war of extermination since the Nazi invasion of Ukraine. It's not kindergarten".

==== Comments on Bandera ====
On 29 June 2022 Andriy Melnyk gave an interview to Tilo Jung where he denied the interviewer's claim that Stepan Bandera's followers were "involved in the killing of 800,000 Jews" during World War II, to which Melnyk replied "there is no evidence that Bandera's troops killed hundreds of thousands of Jews. There is zero evidence." Melnyk called this claim a narrative pushed by Russia that is now being supported by Germany, Poland, and Israel. After an official protest of the Ministry of Foreign Affairs of Poland, Ukraine's Ministry of Foreign Affairs published a statement on 1 July 2022 in which it was declared that this was Melnyk's private opinion. On 1 July 2022 the Embassy of Israel in Berlin published a statement on Melnyk's interview which criticized him for "a distortion of historical facts concerning the Holocaust." Felix Klein, the Federal Government Commissioner for Jewish Life in Germany and the Fight against Anti-Semitism in Germany, reprimanded Melnyk and appealed to Ukraine to seek rapid admission to the International Holocaust Remembrance Alliance (IHRA), an intergovernmental organization which is dedicated to the study of the Holocaust. Klein regretted that the Ukrainian government had so far been negative about an IHRA membership.

On 9 July 2022, just weeks after his controversial statements, the Ministry of Foreign Affairs of Ukraine announced that Melnyk had been dismissed from his position as ambassador to Germany. Melnyk was dismissed along with several other of Ukraine's ambassadors; president Volodymyr Zelenskyy said that "this rotation is a normal part of diplomatic practice". It was expected that he would remain in office until the end of September 2022, after which he would move to Kyiv.

==== Spat with Elon Musk ====
On 3 October 2022, Melnyk tweeted "Fuck off is my very diplomatic reply to you @elonmusk" in response to a proposal from Musk for Ukraine to give up Crimea and hold elections in Russian occupied territories. On October 12, Ukraine's Vice Prime Minister and Minister of Digital Transformation Mykhailo Fedorov stressed how important Starlink from Musk's SpaceX was to Ukraine and Musk confirmed his support for Ukraine. On October 14 it surfaced that SpaceX had written the Pentagon that it could not indefinitely fund the operation of Starlink in Ukraine. In spite of having communicated this financing issue in September, Musk elaborated on the Starlink funding issue by retorting in reference to Melnyk "We’re just following his recommendation”. The day after, Musk tweeted that in spite of the cost, SpaceX would continue to fund the operation of Starlink in Ukraine.

== Monographs ==
Andriy Melnyk is the author of publications on international law, including several monographs. He was the first person to conduct significant research into the succession of Ukraine in relation to international treaties of the USSR in one such book.

== Awards and ranks ==
- Envoy Extraordinary and Minister Plenipotentiary of the first class (2012)
- Ambassador Extraordinary and Plenipotentiary (2016)
- Order of Merit of the II degree (21 August 2020)

== See also ==
- Embassy of Ukraine, Berlin
- Embassy of Ukraine in Austria
- Massacres of Poles in Volhynia and Eastern Galicia
