= List of ambassadors of Ukraine to Germany =

Ambassador of Ukraine to Germany

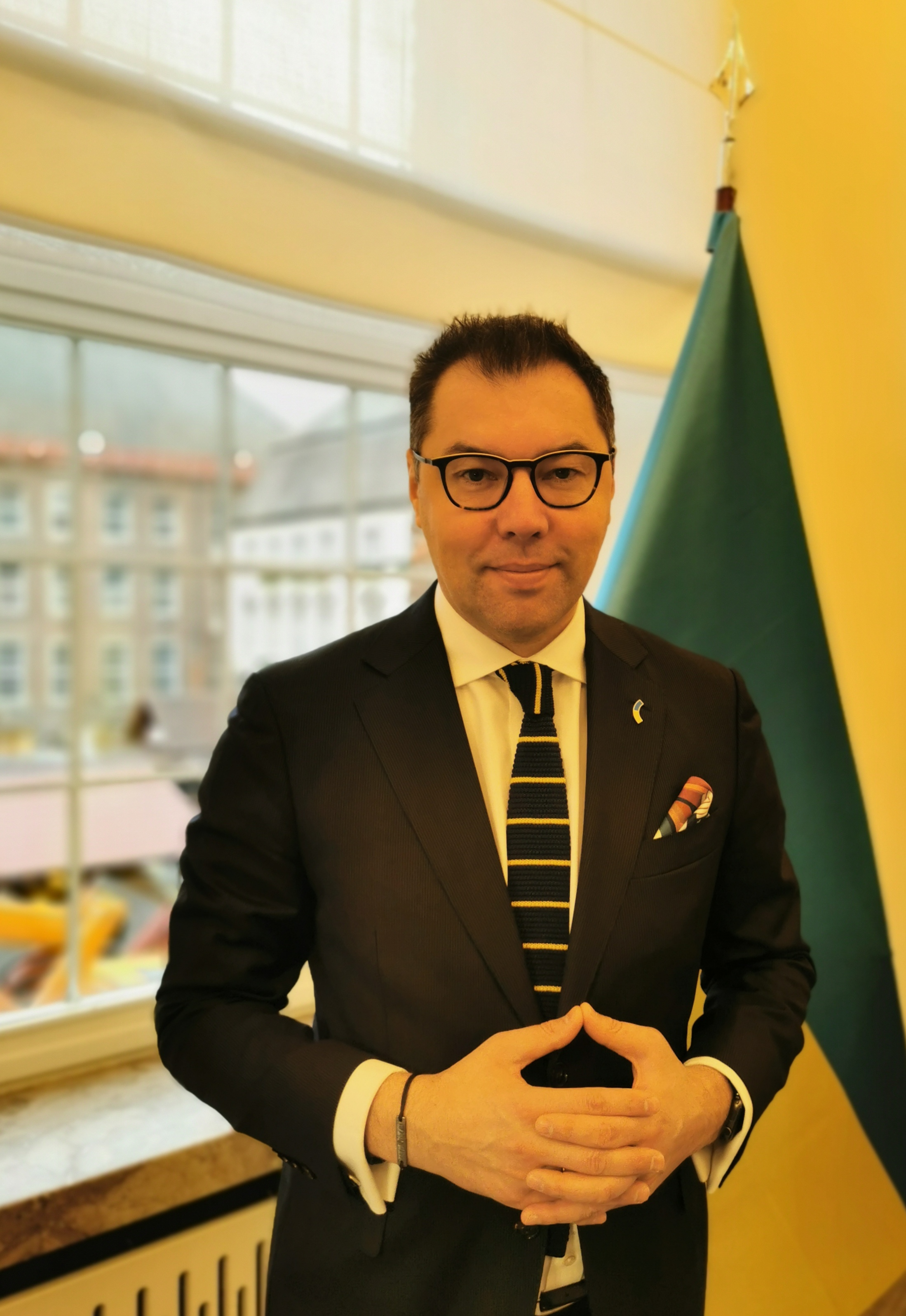
- Incumbent; Oleksii Makeiev since 24 October 2022
- Nominator: Volodymyr Zelenskyy
- Inaugural holder: Ivan Piskovyi as Ambassador Extraordinary and Plenipotentiary
- Formation: 1992
- Website: Ukraine Embassy - Berlin

The Ambassador Extraordinary and Plenipotentiary of Ukraine to Germany (Ukrainian: Надзвичайний і Повноважний посол України в Німеччині) is the ambassador of Ukraine to Germany. The current ambassador is Oleksiy Makeev. He assumed the position in October 2022.

The first Ukrainian ambassador to Germany assumed his post in 1992, the same year a Ukrainian embassy opened in Berlin.

== List of representatives ==
=== Ukrainian People's Republic ===
- 1918-1918 Teodor Shteingel
- 1918-1920 Mykola Porsh
- 1920-1923 Roman Smal-Stocki
- 1923-1923 Mykola von Wassilko

=== Ukraine ===
- 6 March 1992 - 07 June 1994: Ivan Piskovyi
- 28 December 1994 - 2 September 1997: Yurii V. Kostenko
- 2 September 1997 - 26 November 2003: Anatoly Ponomarenko
- 28 November 2003 - 26 July 2005: Serhiy Farenyk
- 9 December 2005 - 4 April 2008: Ihor Dolhov
- 4 September 2008 - 16 December 2011: Natalia Zarudna
- 22 June 2012 - 19 June 2014: Pavlo Klimkin
- 20 December 2014 - 14 October 2022: Andriy Melnyk
- 24 October 2022 - Incumbent: Oleksii Makeiev

== See also ==
- Ukrainian Embassy, Berlin
- Embassy of Germany, Kyiv
