= Klimkin =

Klimkin (masculine, Russian: Климкин) or Klimkina (feminine, Russian: Климкина) is a Russian surname. Notable people with the surname include:

- Ilia Klimkin (born 1980), Russian figure skater
- Pavlo Klimkin (born 1967), Ukrainian diplomat and current Minister of Foreign Affairs of Ukraine
