= Stocki (surname) =

Stocki (feminine: Stocka) is a surname. Notable people with this surname include:

- Elaine Stocki (born 1979), Canadian artist and academic
- Roman Smal-Stocki (1893–1969), Ukrainian diplomat
- Tomasz Stocki (born 1953), Polish sailor

== See also ==
- Stotsky
