= Stotsky =

Stotsky or Stotzky (Russian: Стоцкий) is a Russian-language surname derived from the Polish surname Stocki. As a Jewish surname, in Hebrew it is spelled as סטצקי and may be transliterated as Stetzky, Stetski, etc. Notable people with the surname include:

- Dmitry Stotsky (born 1989), Russian footballer
- Sandra Stotsky, American professor
- Stepan Smal-Stotsky (1859–1938), Ukrainian linguist and academician
- Irwin Stotzky, American professor
