= List of diplomatic missions in Austria =

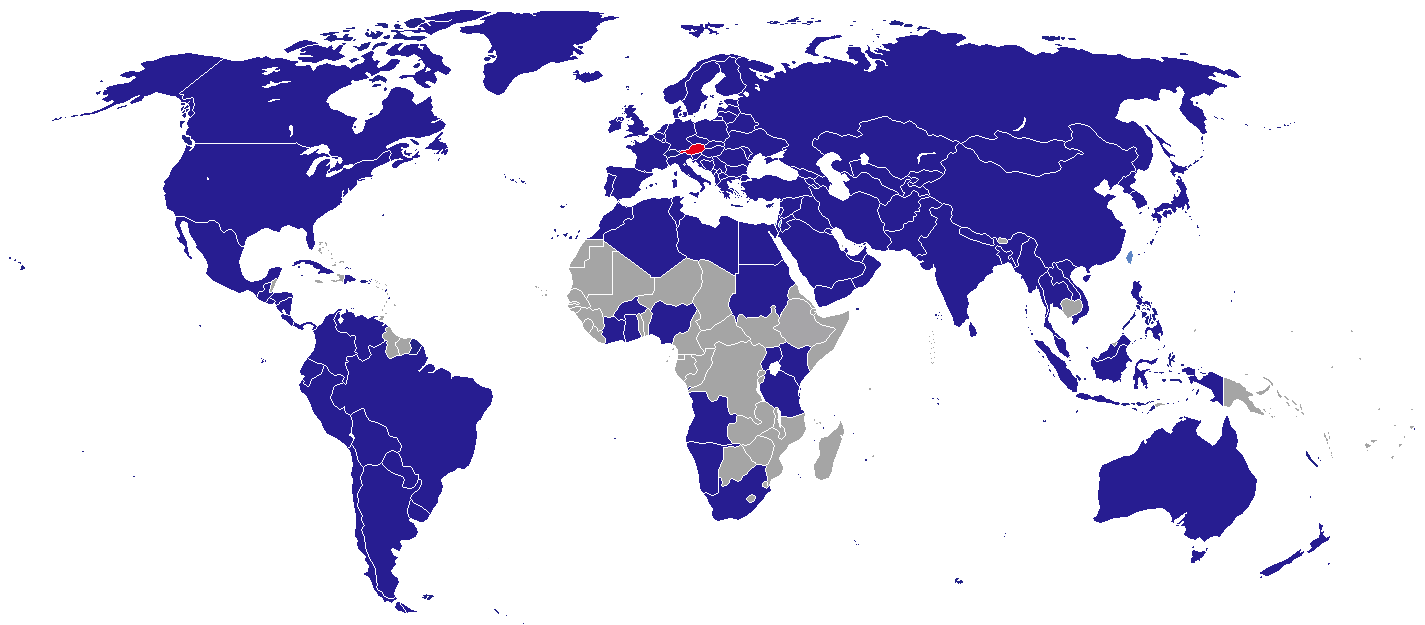
Map of diplomatic missions in Austria

This article lists diplomatic missions resident in Austria. At present, the capital city of Vienna hosts 126 embassies. Several other countries have ambassadors accredited to Austria, with most being resident in Berlin.

This listing excludes honorary consulates.

== Diplomatic missions in Vienna ==
Country	Mission type	Photo
Afghanistan	Embassy	
Albania	Embassy	
Algeria	Embassy	
Andorra	Embassy	
Angola	Embassy	
Argentina	Embassy	
Armenia	Embassy	
Australia	Embassy	
Azerbaijan	Embassy	
Bangladesh	Embassy	
Belarus	Embassy	
Belgium	Embassy	
Bolivia	Embassy	
Bosnia and Herzegovina	Embassy	
Brazil	Embassy	
Bulgaria	Embassy	
Burkina Faso	Embassy	
Canada	Embassy	
Chile	Embassy	
China	Embassy	
Colombia	Embassy	
Costa Rica	Embassy	
Croatia	Embassy	
Cuba	Embassy	
Cyprus	Embassy	
Czech Republic	Embassy	
Denmark	Embassy	
Dominican Republic	Embassy	
Ecuador	Embassy	
Egypt	Embassy	
El Salvador	Embassy	
Estonia	Embassy	
Finland	Embassy	
France	Embassy	
Georgia	Embassy	
Germany	Embassy	
Ghana	Embassy	
Greece	Embassy	
Guatemala	Embassy	
Holy See	Apostolic Nunciature	
Honduras	Embassy	
Hungary	Embassy	
Iceland	Embassy	
India	Embassy	
Indonesia	Embassy	
Iran	Embassy	
Iraq	Embassy	
Ireland	Embassy	
Israel	Embassy	
Italy	Embassy	
Ivory Coast	Embassy	
Japan	Embassy	
Jordan	Embassy	
Kazakhstan	Embassy	
Kenya	Embassy	
Kosovo	Embassy	
Kuwait	Embassy	
Kyrgyzstan	Embassy	
Laos	Embassy	
Latvia	Embassy	
Lebanon	Embassy	
Libya	Embassy	
Liechtenstein	Embassy	
Lithuania	Embassy	
Luxembourg	Embassy	
Malaysia	Embassy	
Malta	Embassy	
Mexico	Embassy	
Moldova	Embassy	
Mongolia	Embassy	
Montenegro	Embassy	
Morocco	Embassy	
Myanmar	Embassy	
Namibia	Embassy	
Nepal	Embassy	
Netherlands	Embassy	
New Zealand	Embassy	
Nicaragua	Embassy	
Nigeria	Embassy	
North Korea	Embassy	
North Macedonia	Embassy	
Norway	Embassy	
Oman	Embassy	
Pakistan	Embassy	
Panama	Embassy	
Paraguay	Embassy	
Peru	Embassy	
Philippines	Embassy	
Poland	Embassy	
Portugal	Embassy	
Qatar	Embassy	
Romania	Embassy	
Russia	Embassy	
San Marino	Embassy	
Saudi Arabia	Embassy	
Serbia	Embassy	
Slovakia	Embassy	
Slovenia	Embassy	
South Africa	Embassy	
South Korea	Embassy	
Sovereign Military Order of Malta	Embassy	
Spain	Embassy	
Sri Lanka	Embassy	
Sudan	Embassy	
Sweden	Embassy	
Switzerland	Embassy	
Syria	Embassy	
Tajikistan	Embassy	
Tanzania	Embassy	
Thailand	Embassy	
Tunisia	Embassy	
Turkey	Embassy	
Turkmenistan	Embassy	
Uganda	Embassy	
Ukraine	Embassy	
United Arab Emirates	Embassy	
United Kingdom	Embassy	
United States	Embassy	
Uruguay	Embassy	
Uzbekistan	Embassy	
Venezuela	Embassy	
Vietnam	Embassy	
Yemen	Embassy	

== Representatives Offices in Vienna ==
Country/territory	Mission type	Photo
Catalonia (Spain)	Delegation	
Palestine	Mission	
Republic of China (Taiwan)	Representative Office	

== Consulates in Austria ==
Country	Mission type	City	Photo
Hungary	Consulate-General	Innsbruck	
Romania	Consulate-General	Salzburg	
Russia	Consulate-General	Salzburg	
Slovenia	Consulate-General	Klagenfurt	
Serbia	Consulate-General	Salzburg	
Turkey	Consulate-General	Bregenz	
Turkey	Consulate-General	Salzburg	

== Non-resident embassies ==
=== Resident in Berlin, Germany ===
1. Brunei
2. Burundi
3. Cameroon
4. Chad
5. Congo-Brazzaville
6. Congo-Kinshasa
7. Djibouti
8. Equatorial Guinea
9. Eritrea
10. Gabon
11. Lesotho
12. Liberia
13. Madagascar
14. Mali
15. Mauritania
16. Mauritius
17. Monaco
18. Mozambique
19. Senegal
20. Sierra Leone
21. South Sudan
22. Togo
23. Zambia

=== Resident in Brussels, Belgium ===
1. Cambodia
2. Guyana
3. Samoa
4. São Tomé and Príncipe
5. Suriname

=== Resident in Geneva, Switzerland ===
1. Bahrain
2. Barbados
3. Bhutan
4. Botswana
5. Cape Verde
6. Eswatini
7. Ethiopia
8. Guinea
9. Haiti
10. Jamaica
11. Malawi
12. Maldives
13. Niger
14. Rwanda
15. Somalia
16. Trinidad and Tobago

=== Resident in London, United Kingdom ===
1. Bahamas
2. Gambia
3. Saint Vincent and the Grenadines

=== Resident in Paris, France ===
1. Benin
2. Central African Republic
3. Seychelles

=== Resident elsewhere ===
1. Singapore (Singapore)

== Closed missions ==
Host city	Sending country	Mission	Year closed	Ref.
Vienna	Cape Verde	Embassy (Note: Resident in Geneva, Switzerland)	Unknown	
Vienna	Ethiopia	Embassy	2010	
Vienna	Zimbabwe	Embassy	2015	
Graz	Serbia	Consulate-General	2008	
Innsbruck	France	Consulate-General	1997	
Innsbruck	Italy	Consulate-General	2012	
Klagenfurt	Italy	Consulate-General	2000	

== See also ==
- Foreign relations of Austria
- Visa policy of Austria
- Visa requirements for Austrian citizens
