= Dror Stetski =

Israeli footballer

Dror Stetski דרור סטצקי
Personal information
- Full name: Dror Stetski
- Place of birth: Israel

Senior career*
Years	Team	Apps	(Gls)
1953–1966	Maccabi Netanya	219	(24)
- * Club domestic league appearances and goals

Dror Stetski (Hebrew: דרור סטצקי, also may be transliterated as Dror Stotsky etc. and other variants) is a former Israeli footballer who played in Maccabi Netanya in the 1950s and 1960s.

== Honours (for the team) ==
- Israel State Cup
  - Runner-up (1): 1954
- Second Division
  - Runner-up (1): 1963-64
