= Stetski =

Stetski (Russian: Стецкий) is a Russian-language surname derived from the Polish surname Stecki. As a Jewish surname, in Hebrew it is spelled as סטצקי and may be transliterated as Stetzky, Stotsky, etc. Notable people with the surname and its variants include:

- Aleksei Stetskii (1896–1938, Soviet politician and journalist
- Dror Stetski, (fl. 1960) Israeli footballer
- Jen Statsky (born 1985), American television writer and comedian
- Wayne Stetski (born 1952), Canadian politician
