= Ihor Dolhov =

Ukrainian diplomat (born 1957)

- Ігор Долгов
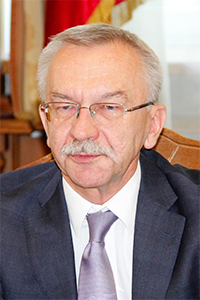

Ambassador of Ukraine to Georgia
- In office 2017–2022
- Preceded by: Heorhiy Nazarov
- Succeeded by: vacant

Deputy Minister of Defense of Ukraine for European Integration
- In office 2015–2017

Ambassador of Ukraine to Belgium and Luxembourg
- In office 2010–2015
- President: Viktor Yanukovych; Petro Poroshenko
- Preceded by: Yevhen Bersheda
- Succeeded by: Mykola Tochytskyi

Mission of Ukraine to NATO
- In office 2010–2015
- President: Viktor Yanukovych; Petro Poroshenko
- Preceded by: Ihor Sahach

Ambassador of Ukraine to Germany
- In office 2005–2008
- President: Viktor Yushchenko
- Preceded by: Serhiy Farenyk
- Succeeded by: Natalia Zarudna

Ambassador of Ukraine to Turkey
- In office 2002–2004
- President: Leonid Kuchma
- Preceded by: Oleksandr Motsyk
- Succeeded by: Oleksandr Mishchenko

Personal details
- Born: 6 June 1957 (age 69) Slavuta
- Education: Kiev University

Ihor Oleksiiovych Dolhov (Ukrainian: Ігор Олексійович Долгов) (birth: June 6, 1957, Slavuta, Ukraine) is a Ukrainian diplomat. Ambassador Extraordinary and Plenipotentiary of Ukraine. Deputy Defense Minister of Ukraine for European Integration.

== Education ==
Ihor Dolhov graduated from Taras Shevchenko National University of Kyiv in 1980, philologist, lecturer, PhD in linguistics

== Career ==
1980–1992 — he was assistant, the Department of the Russian Language and the Methodology of its Tuition as a Foreign Language Taras Shevchenko National University of Kyiv.

March 1992 – March 1993 — 1st Secretary Information Section Ministry of Foreign Affairs of Ukraine.

1994–1997 — he was Counselor Embassy of Ukraine in Finland

November 1997 to December 2000 — Deputy Head of the Department of Political Analysis and Planning Ministry of Foreign Affairs of Ukraine.

December 2000 to October 2001 — Deputy Head of the Main Directorate for Foreign Policy the Presidential Administration of Ukraine.

October 2001 to April 2002 — Director of the Department for Policy and Security — Head of the Directorate for Political Analysis and Information Ministry of Foreign Affairs of Ukraine.

From April 2002 to July 2004 — Ambassador Extraordinary and Plenipotentiary of Ukraine in the Republic of Turkey.

From September 2004 to January 2006 — Deputy Minister of Foreign Affairs of Ukraine.

From January 2006 to May 2008 — Ambassador Extraordinary and Plenipotentiary of Ukraine in the Federal Republic of Germany

From May 2008 to February 2009 — Head of the Main Directorate for Foreign Policy Secretariat of President of Ukraine.

From February 2009 to June 2010 — Ambassador at Large of the Department for Information Policy Ministry of Foreign Affairs of Ukraine.

From 22 July 2010 to 29 May 2015 — Ambassador Extraordinary and Plenipotentiary of Ukraine in Belgium, Luxembourg and NATO

From June 2015 to February 2017 — Deputy Defense Minister of Ukraine for European Integration.

From February 2017 — Ambassador Extraordinary and Plenipotentiary of Ukraine in Georgia.
