= Natalia Zarudna =

Ukrainian diplomat (born 1950)

- Зарудна Миколаївна

Ambassador Extraordinary and Plenipotentiary of Ukraine to Germany
- In office 2008–2011
- Preceded by: Ihor Dolhov
- Succeeded by: Pavlo Klimkin

Ambassador Extraordinary and Plenipotentiary of Ukraine to Denmark
- In office 2004–2008
- Preceded by: Olexandr Slipchenko
- Succeeded by: Olena Polunina

Personal details
- Born: 15 February 1950 (age 76) Chernivtsi
- Education: Kyiv University

Natalia Zarudna (Ukrainian: Зарудна Наталія Миколаївна) (Born: 15 February 1950) is a Ukrainian career diplomat, has headed the Programme Office in Astana since December 2011. Before joining the OSCE, she represented her country in Germany and Denmark, and was Ambassador-at-large for environmental issues and for humanitarian and cultural cooperation. In 2002 and 2003, she served as Deputy Foreign Minister.

== Early life and education ==
She was born in Chernivtsi, on 15 February 1950. Zarudna graduated from Taras Shevchenko National University of Kyiv in 1973, after studying Phiology, later she worked as an English and Spanish teacher. She speaks fluent Russian, English, and Spanish.

== Professional career and experience ==
From 1973 to 1992, she worked as a translator, guide translator of the first category of the Anglo-American group of the Kyiv branch of the State Committee on Tourism.

Since 1992 she has been the second secretary of the Ministry of Foreign Affairs of Ukraine.

From 1992 to 1993, she was the first Secretary of the Ministry of Foreign Affairs of Ukraine.

In 1993, she was acting Head of the Information Department of the Ministry of Foreign Affairs of Ukraine.

From 1993 to 1994, she was the Head of the Liaison Department with the Embassies of the Ministry of Foreign Affairs of Ukraine.

From 1994 to 1996, she was the Head of the Embassy Liaison Department, acting Head of the Information Ministry of the Ministry of Foreign Affairs of Ukraine.

From 1996 to 1999, she was an advisor, acting advisor to the Ambassador of the Embassy of Ukraine to the United States, Deputy Permanent Observer of Ukraine at the Organization of American States.

From 1999 to 2000 she worked as the chief of the 4th territorial department of the MFA of Ukraine.

From 01.2000 to 03.2000 Press Secretary of the Prime Minister of Ukraine, Head of the Press Service and Protocol Service of the Government of Ukraine.

From 01.2000 to 06.2001 Press Secretary of the Prime Minister of Ukraine - Head of the Press Service of the Government of Ukraine.

Since 12.2001 she has been acting Head of the Department of Culture and Humanitarian Cooperation of the Ministry of Foreign Affairs of Ukraine.

Since December 25, 2001 she was the Deputy Chairman of the National Commission of Ukraine for UNESCO, participated in the work of the executive board of UNESCO.

From 10.2002 to 09.2003 she worked as Deputy State Secretary of the Ministry of Foreign Affairs of Ukraine.

From 12.2004 to 04.09.2008 Ambassador Extraordinary and Plenipotentiary of Ukraine to the Kingdom of Denmark.

From 04.09.2008 to 16.12.2011 Ambassador Extraordinary and Plenipotentiary of Ukraine to the Federal Republic of Germany.

Since 2012, she has been managing the OSCE programs in Astana, Kazakhstan.
