= Mykola Porsh =

Political activist in Ukraine

- Микола Порш
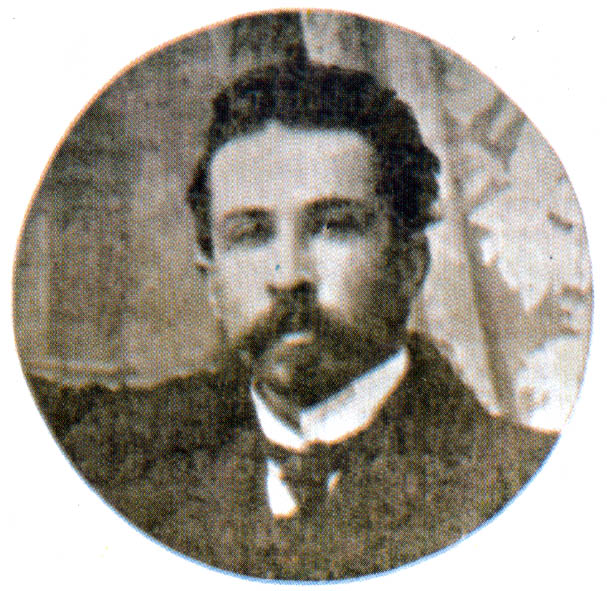

Minister of Labor Affairs
- In office 12 September 1917 – 31 January 1918
- Prime Minister: Volodymyr Vynnychenko
- Preceded by: Bolshevik's quota (unfulfilled)
- Succeeded by: Leonid Mykhailiv

Minister of Military Affairs
- In office 6 January 1918 – 31 January 1918
- Prime Minister: Volodymyr Vynnychenko
- Preceded by: Symon Petliura
- Succeeded by: Ivan Nemolovsky

Ambassador of Ukraine to Germany
- In office 1919–1920
- President: Symon Petliura
- Preceded by: Teodor Shteingel
- Succeeded by: Roman Smal-Stocki

Personal details
- Born: 19 October 1879 Lubny, Poltava Governorate, Russian Empire
- Died: 16 April 1944 (aged 64) Berlin, Nazi Germany
- Party: USDLP
- Education: Kyiv Polytechnic Institute
- Occupation: statesman, diplomat

Mykola Volodymyrovych Porsh (Ukrainian: Микола Володимирович Порш; 19 October 1879 – 16 April 1944) was a political and civil activist of Ukraine, economist, member of the Russian Constituent Assembly.

He was a prominent activist of the Revolutionary Ukrainian Party (de facto since 1903) and the Ukrainian Social Democratic Labour Party (since 1905). Porsh was an active member of the Central Council of Ukraine and a General Secretary (minister) of Labor and Military Affairs. Later he served as an ambassador to Germany.

== Biography ==
Mykola Porsh was born on 19 October 1879 in Lubny into a German-Jewish noble family. His father was a jurist.

Mykola Porsh studied at the Lubny Gymnasium and later the Kyiv University of St. Vladimir. From the 1890s he was involved with Marxism, participated in a national movement and soon joined circles of the Revolutionary Ukrainian Party. In 1905 as the party's chairman Porsh replaced Dmytro Antonovych with whom he previously published newspaper "Pratsia" (Labor). Porsh wanted to create new edition of the party's statute changing it from a peasantry orientation to more of workers. In 1906 along with number of other future political leaders (Mykhailo Hrushevsky, Volodymyr Vynnychenko, Symon Petliura) he created the Ukrainian Social Democratic Labour Party. After the liquidation of the RUP, Mykola Porsh emigrated to Lemberg.

In 1917 Mykola Porsh was elected to the Central Council of Ukraine and in November 1917 he was appointed as the General Secretary of Military Affairs. During that time Ukraine was not able to stop advances of the Russian Red Guards and save Kyiv from the Russian occupation. On his submission on 16 January 1918, the Minor Council adopted the law "About People's Army" which regulated the basic principle of creating the Ukrainian Army based on people's militia. During that period 1917-1918, Mykola Porsh headed the Soviet of Workers Deputies.

On 27 July 1918, along with Symon Petliura, Mykola Porsh was arrested as a representative of leftist movements that were involved with created at the People's Administrations Society an organization, goal of which was an armed revolt to overthrow the existing government of the Ukrainian State.

During the times of Directorate Porsh served as Ukraine's ambassador in Berlin. On that post, he became entangled in several corruption scandals, including purchase of low-quality linen for the Ukrainian army at a sum exceeding the real price over 6 times, embezzlement of funds allocated for the development of Ukrainian press and purchase of expensive real estate in Czechoslovakia for his romantic partner. As a result, on 26 August 1920 he was forced to resign, but refused to repay the sums to Ukrainian authorities.

After the government of Ukraine went into exile, Porsh quit political life and permanently settled in Germany, where he wrote a number of scientific works. He translated in the Ukrainian language the first volume of Das Kapital by Karl Marx. Mykola Porsh died on 16 April 1944 and was buried in Berlin.

== Bibliography ==
- Porsh, M. About the autonomy. Kyiv 1907
