= List of scientific institutions of the National Academy of Sciences of Ukraine =

List of Scientific institutions of the National Academy of Sciences of Ukraine (Ukrainian: Наукові установи НАН України) by departments.

== Section of technical physics and mathematical sciences ==
=== Department of Mathematics ===
- NASU Institute of Mathematics
- NASU Institute of Applied Mathematics and Mechanics
- Pidstryhach Institute of Applied Problems in Mechanics and Mathematics
  - NASU Center on Informational Problems of Territories
  - NASU Center of Mathematical Modeling
- Mytropolsky International Center of Mathematics

=== Department of Informatics ===
- NASU Center of Cybernetics
- Hlushkov Institute of Cybernetics
- NASU Institute of Software Systems
- NASU Institute of Space Research (along with State Space Agency of Ukraine)
  - Lviv Center
  - Kharkiv Center
- NASU Institute for Information Recording
  - Uzhhhorod Science and Technology Center of Information Carrying Optical Materials
- NASU Institute on Problems of Artificial Intelligence (along with Ministry of Education and Science)
- Dobrov Center for Scientific and Technological Potential and Science History Studies
- NASU Educational and Scientific Complex "Institute of Applied Systems Analysis" (along with Kyiv Polytechnic Institute)
- International Science Center of Informational Technologies and Systems (along with Ministry of Education and Science)
- State Research Institute of Informatics and Modeling of Economics (along with Ministry of Economical Development and Trade)

=== Department of Mechanics ===
- Polyakov Institute of Mechanical Geoengineering
  - Special design bureau
- Tymoshenko Institute of Mechanics
  - Research production
- Pysarenko Institute on problems of Strength
  - Special design bureau
- Institute of Mechanical Engineering (along with State Space Agency of Ukraine)
  - Special design bureau (along with State Space Agency of Ukraine)
- Institute of Hydromechanics
- Institute of Transportation Systems and Technologies
- Institute of Machines and Systems
- Science Engineering Center of Newest Technologies

=== Department of Physics and Astronomy ===
- Main Astronomical Observatory
  - Crimean Laser Observatory
- Halkin Institute of Physics and Engineering in Donetsk
- Institute of Electronic Physics
- Institute of Ionosphere (along with Ministry of Education and Science)
- Kudryumov Institute of Physics of Metals
- Institute of Magnetism (along with Ministry of Education and Science)
- Institute of applied problems in Physics and Biophysics
- Usykov Institute of Radiophysics and Electronics
- Bogolyubov Institute of Theoretical Physics
- Institute of Physics
  - Special design bureau of Physical Instruments with research production
- Institute of Physics in Mining Processes
- Institute of Physics in Condensed Systems
  - Science and Telecommunication Center "Ukrainian Academic and Research Network"
- Lashkaryov Institute of Physics in Semiconductors
  - Technological park "Semiconducting Technologies and Materials, Optical Electronic and Sensor Technology"
  - Special design bureau with research production
- Radioastronomical Institute
- Verkin Institute for Low Temperature Physics and Engineering
- International center "Institute of Applied Optics"
- Science and Technology Center "Reactive-Electron"

=== Department of Earth Science ===
- NASU Institute of Geography
- NASU Institute of Geology and Geochemistry of Fossil Fuels
- NASU Institute of Geological Sciences
- Subbotin Institute of Geophysics
- Semenenko Institute of Geochemistry, Mineralogy and Ore Mineralization
- NASU Institute on problems of Environmental Use and Ecology
- NASU Institute of Marine Hydrophysics

=== Department of Materials Physics and Engineering ===
- Paton Institute of Electric Welding
- NASU Institute of Pulse Processes and Technologies
- NASU Institute of Monocrystalline
- Bakul Institute of Superhard Materials
- NASU Institute of Scintillation Materials
- NASU Institute of Thermoelectrics (along with Ministry of Education and Science)
- Nekrasov Institute of Ferrous Metallurgy
- Karpenko Institute of Physics and Mechanics
- NASU Institute of Metals and Alloys Physics

=== Department of Energy Physics and Engineering ===
- NASU Institute of Renewable Energy
- NASU Institute of Coal producing Energy Technologies
- NASU Institute of Gas
- NASU Institute of Electrodynamics
- NASU Institute of Thermophysics Engineering
- Pukhov Institute on problem of modeling in Energy

=== Department of Nuclear Physics and Energy ===
- NASU Institute of Geochemistry of Surrounding Environment (along with State Emergency Service)
- NASU Institute of Nuclear Research
- Kharkiv Institute of Physics and Engineering

== Section of Chemical and Biological Sciences ==
=== Department of Chemistry ===
- Ovcharenko Institute of Biocolloidal Chemistry
- NASU Institute of Bioorganic Chemistry and Petrochemistry
- Vernadsky Institute of General and Non-organic Chemistry
- Dumansky Institute of Colloidal Chemistry and Water Chemistry
- NASU Institute of Organic Chemistry
- Lytvynenko Institute of Physical Organic Chemistry and Coal Chemistry
- Pysarzhevsky Institute of Physical Chemistry
- NASU Institute of Sorption and Problems of Endoecology
- NASU Institute of Food Chemistry and Technology
- NASU Institute of Macromolecular Chemistry
- NASU Institute of Surface Chemistry
- Bohatsky Institute of Physics and Chemistry

=== Department of Biochemistry, Physiology and Molecular Biology ===
- NASU Institute of Cell Biology
- Palladin Institute of Biochemistry
- Kavetsky Institute of Experimental Pathology, Oncology, and Radiobiology
- Zabolotny Institute of Microbiology and Virology
- NASU Institute of Cryobiology and Cryomedicine Problems
- Bohomolets Institute of Physiology

=== Department of General Biology ===
- Kovalevsky Institute of Southern Seas Biology
- Kholodny Institute of Botanic Studies
- NASU Institute of Hydrobiology
- NASU Institute of Carpathian Ecology
- Schmalhausen Institute of Zoology
- NASU Institute of Cell Biology and Genetical Engineering
- NASU Institute of Plant Physiology and Genetics
- NASU Institute of Food Biotechnology and Genomics
- Trostianets State Arboretum
- Oleksandriya National Arboretum
- Sofiyivka National Arboretum
- Danube Biosphere Preserve
- Black Sea Biosphere Preserve
- Karadag Nature Preserve
- Luhansk Nature Preserve
- Ukrainian Steppe Nature Preserve
- Donetsk Botanical Garden
- Kryvyi Rih Botanical Garden
- Hryshko National Botanical Garden
- Feofaniya Park and Garden

== Section of Social and Humanitarian Sciences ==
=== Department of Economics ===
- Ptukha Institute of Demographics and Social Research
- NASU Institute of Industrial Economics
- NASU Institute of Economics and Forecasting

=== Department of History, Philosophy, and Law ===
- NASU Institute of Archaeology
- Koretsky Institute of State and Law
- NASU Institute of History of Ukraine
- Kuras Institute of Political and Ethnological Research
- NASU Institute of Sociology
- Krymsky Institute of Oriental Studies
- Skovoroda Institute of Philosophy
- Kyiv University of Law
- Vernadsky National Library of Ukraine
- NASU Center of Humanitarian Education
- Hrushevsky Institute of Ukrainian Archeography and Source Studies

=== Department of Literature, Language, and Art Studies ===
- NASU Institute of Encyclopedic Research
- Shevchenko Institute of Literature
- Rylsky Institute of Art Studies, Folkloristics, and Ethnology
- Potebnia Institute of Linguistics
- NASU Institute of Ethnology
- Krypiakevych Institute of Ukrainian Studies
- NASU Institute of Ukrainian Language
- Ukrainian Language Information Foundation

== Scientific institutions of the NASU Presidium ==
- Institute on problems of Mathematical Machines and Systems
  - Special Design Bureau of Management Systems with Research Production

== Liquidated institutes ==
- NASU Institute of World Economy and International Relations (academician Yuriy Pakhomov)
- NASU International Center of Molecular Physiology (academician Oleh Kryshtal)
