= Embassy of Ukraine, Vienna =

Embassy of Ukraine in Austria

Embassy of Ukraine in Austria
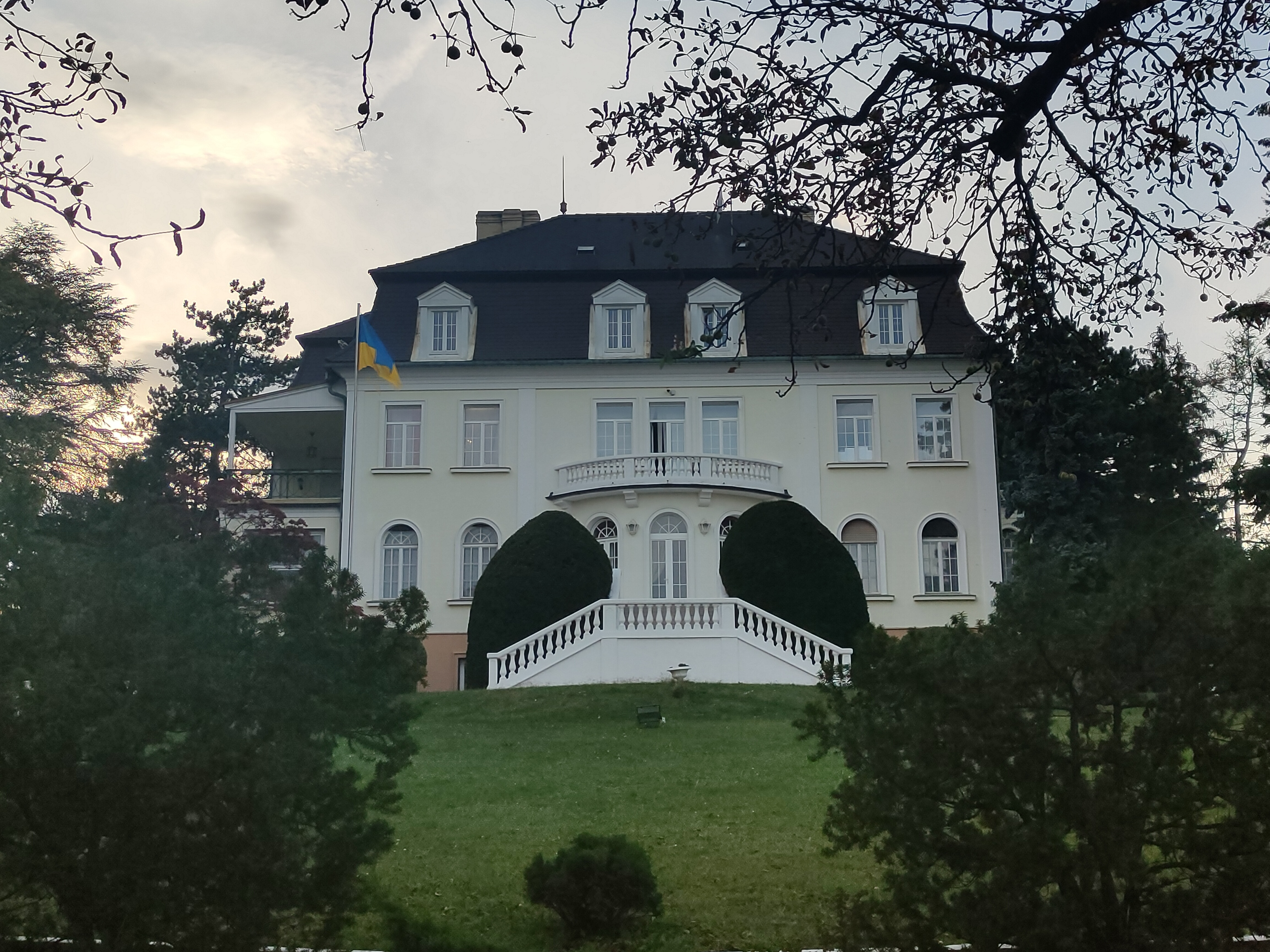
- Embassy of Ukraine in Austria
- Location: Vienna
- Address: Austria Naaffgasse 23, A −1180 Vienna, Austria
- Coordinates: 48°14′2″N 16°18′43″E
- Ambassador: Oleksand Scherba since 2014
- Website: Official Website

The Embassy of Ukraine in Austria is a diplomatic mission of Ukraine in Austria, in Vienna.

== Functions of the embassy ==
The main functions of the embassy of Ukraine in Vienna are to represent the interests of Ukraine, promote the development of political, economic, cultural, scientific and other relations as well as to protect the rights and interests of citizens and legal entities of Ukraine located in Austria. The embassy promotes the development of good neighborly relations between Ukraine and the Republic of Austria at all levels to ensure the harmonious development of mutual relations and cooperation on issues of mutual interest. The embassy also performs consular functions.

== History of diplomatic relations ==
Since 1918 the interests of the Ukrainian People's Republic (UPR) in Austria were represented by A. Yakovliv, V. Lypynskyi, and G. Sydorenko.

Among the employees of the embassy were a well-known public and political figure Andrii Zhuk (counselor), an art critic Volodymyr Zalozetskyi-Sas (government official), a journalist Mykola Trotskyi (secretary, head of the consular department), a lawyer I. Khrapko (legal adviser), V. Trokhymovych (head of the office, head of the economic department), Volodymyr Poletyka (advisor), Volodymyr Semeniv (attache), Horobets, Khomenko (government officials), Bilits, Viacheslav Lypynskyi's personal secretary and friend Mykhailo Tsypriianovych, Mykhailo Bilenkyi (first secretary, treasurer), Bondarenko, Krushelnytskyi, Haievskyi, Khrapko (typist), Stanislav Vankovych (attache), General Viacheslav Levytskyi (military attache, did not take the office), Captain Volodyslav Dashkevych-Horbatskyi (naval attache). The structure of the embassy had 4 departments (consular, passport, press, economic) and the office.

During June 1918 and February 1919, the press department of the embassy was headed by Councilor Ivan Tokarzhevskyi-Karashevych. In 1919–1920 The Ukrainian Press Office in Vienna was headed by O. Kushchak.

On 26 September 1991, in New York City, the Ministers of Foreign Affairs of Ukraine Anatolii Zlenko and Alois Mok signed the Protocol on Consular Relations. On 24 January 1992, diplomatic relations were established between the two states. The Austrian Consulate in Kyiv was transformed into an Embassy. On 3 April 1992, the Embassy of Ukraine in the Republic of Austria began its work in Vienna. Austria is the only country that has not formalized the diplomatic recognition of Ukraine as it believes the fact of Ukraine's membership in the UN and in several international specialized organizations indicates the recognition of Ukraine by the world community in 1945.

== Heads of diplomatic missions ==
Ambassadors of Ukraine in Austria
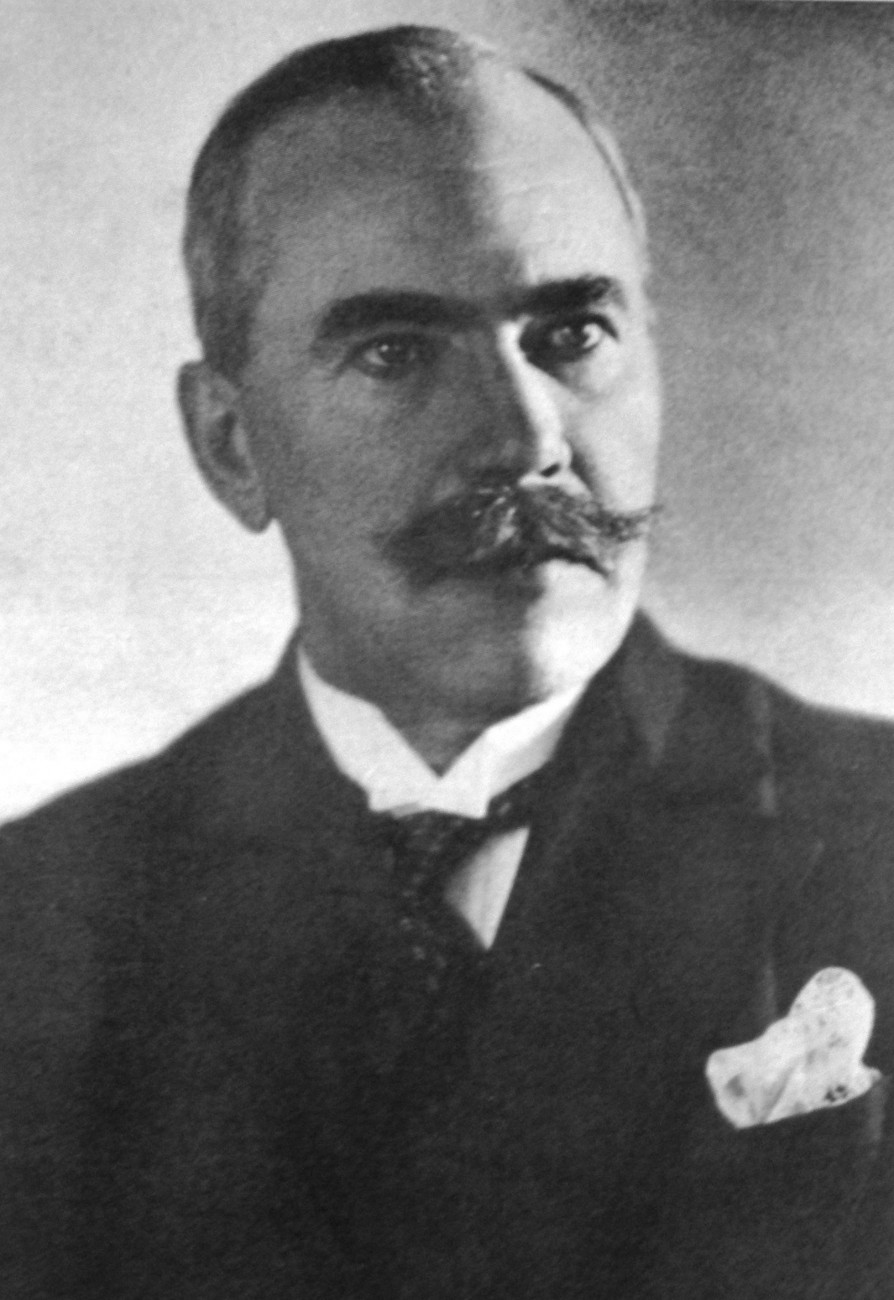
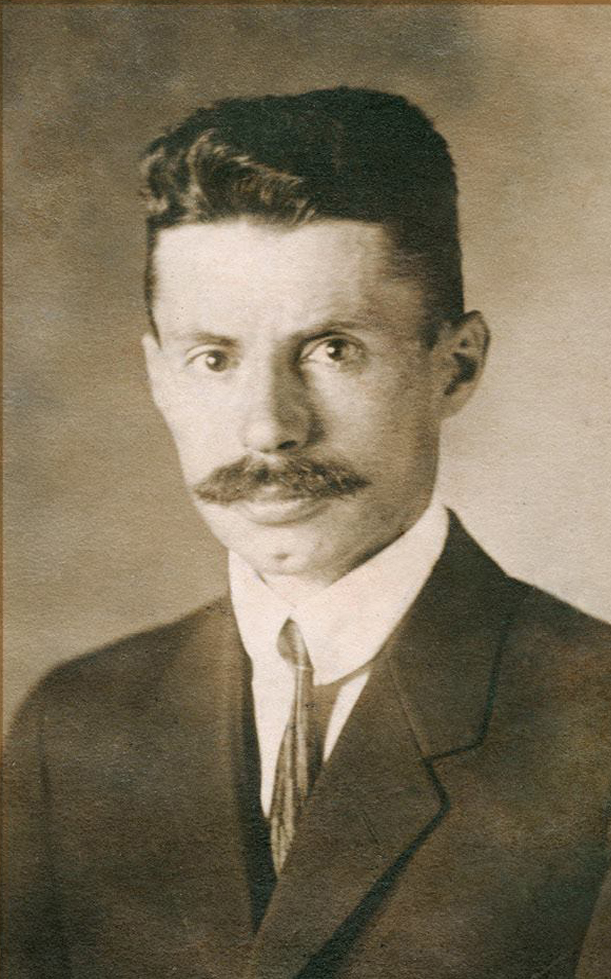
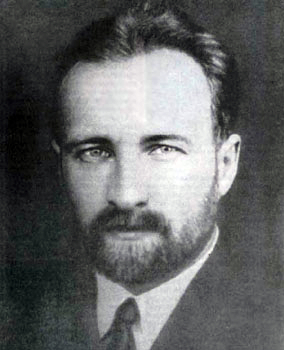
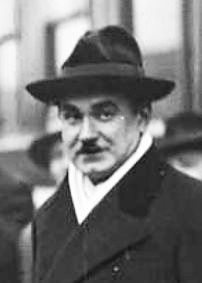
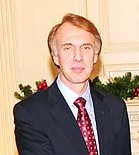
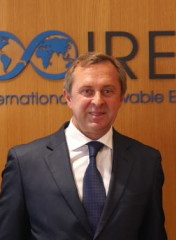
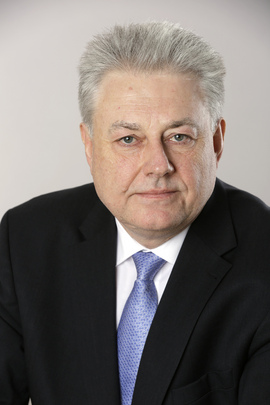
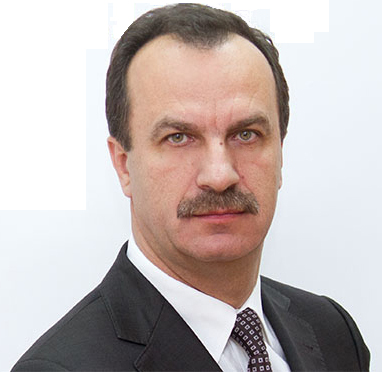
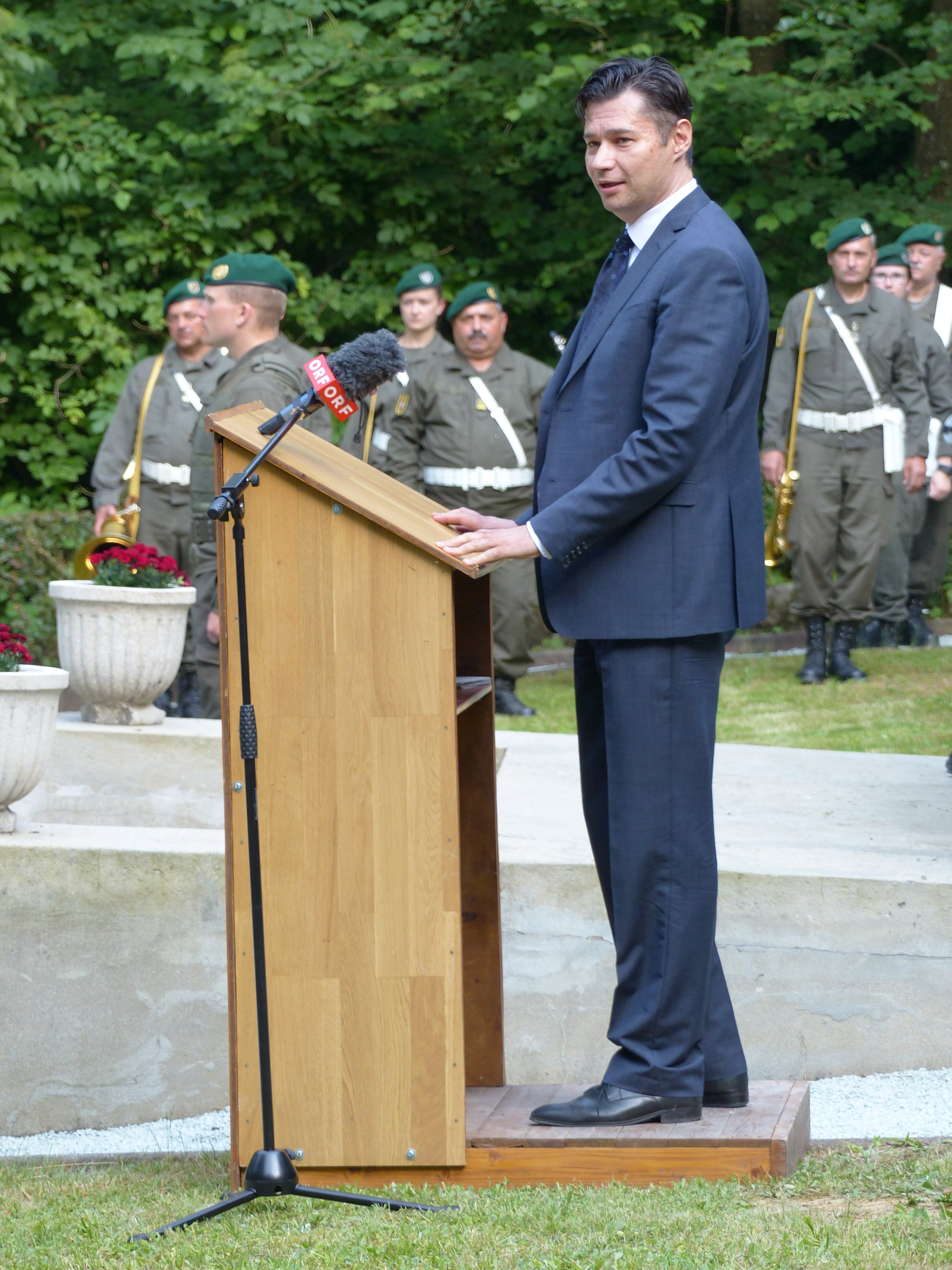
N	In office	Ambassador	Image	Information	Position
1	1918	Andrii Yakovliv		Ukrainian scholar, historian, lawyer, public and political figure; full member of the Ukrainian Scientific Society in Kyiv and of the Shevchenko Scientific Society, head of the Legal Section of the Ukrainian Free Academy of Sciences in New York City. One of the founders of the Museum of the Liberation Struggle of Ukraine in Prague	Head of the diplomatic mission
2	1918–1919	Vyacheslav Lypynsky		Ukrainian politician, historian, historiosophist, sociologist, publicist, theorist of Ukrainian conservatism. One of the organizers of the Ukrainian Democratic-Agricultural Party and the Ukrainian Union of Farmers-Statesmen. Under the Hetmanate was the Ambassador of Ukraine to Austria. Also published under the pseudonyms V. Pravoberezhets, Nobilis Ruthenus, Vasyl Bezridnyi.	Head of the diplomatic mission
3	1919	Vasyl Mazurenko		Ukrainian public and political figure and statesman, process engineer, economist.	Head of the diplomatic mission
4	1919–1921	Hryhorii Sydorenko		Ukrainian politician and diplomat, road engineer. Minister of Posts and Telegraph of the Ukrainian People's Republic. Head of the UPR delegation to the Paris Peace Conference.	Head of the diplomatic mission
5	1921	Mykola Zalizniak		Ukrainian political and public figure, publicist, diplomat. Doctor of Philosophy. One of the figures of the Ukrainian social-revolutionary movement, organizer of student communities in Kyiv and Lviv. One of the founders of the Union for the Liberation of Ukraine (1914), Head the Foreign Committee of the Ukrainian Socialist-Revolutionaries.	Head of the diplomatic mission
6	1921–1922	Yuriy Kotsiubynsky		Ukrainian Soviet figure. Since December 1917 was a member of the first Soviet government of Ukraine. Fought for the establishment of Bolsheviks regime in Ukraine. Candidate for membership in the Central Committee of the Communist Party (of Bolsheviks) of Ukraine (CC of the CP(B)U) in March 1919 – April 1920 and June 1930 – January 1934. Member of the CC of the CP(B)U in January – November 1934. Member of the Organizing Bureau of the CC of the CP(B)U in June – August 1919 and January – November 1934.	Plenipotentiary representative
7	1922	Hryhorii Besiedovskyi		Ukrainian diplomat, intelligence officer	Charge d'Affaires
8	1922–1923	Dmytro Bohomolov		Ukrainian and Soviet diplomat.	First Secretary
9	1992–1994	Yurii V. Kostenko		Ukrainian diplomat. Ambassador Extraordinary and Plenipotentiary.	Ambassador
10	1994–1999	Mykola Makarevych		Ukrainian diplomat, in 1990–1994 – First Deputy Minister of Foreign Affairs of Ukraine, later – Ambassador Extraordinary and Plenipotentiary of Ukraine to Austria and Estonia.	Ambassador
11	1999–2004	Volodymyr Ohryzko		Ukrainian diplomat, Minister for Foreign Affairs of Ukraine from December 2007 to March 2009. Ambassador Extraordinary and Plenipotentiary of Ukraine (1996).	Ambassador
12	2004–2005	Yurii Polurez		Ukrainian diplomat	Ambassador
13	2005–2007	Volodymyr Yelchenko		Ukrainian diplomat. Permanent Representative of Ukraine to the UN (2015–2019). Ambassador Extraordinary and Plenipotentiary of Ukraine to the United States (since 6 January 2020), concurrently Ambassador to Antigua and Barbuda and to Jamaica (since 20 July 2020).	Ambassador
14	2007–2008	Vadym Kostiuk		Ukrainian diplomat. Ambassador Extraordinary and Plenipotentiary. Chargé d'Affaires ad interim of Ukraine in Austria (2007–2008). Consul General of Ukraine in Munich (since 2012).	Chargé d'Affaires ad interim
15	2008–2010	Yevhen Chornobryvko		Ukrainian diplomat. Ambassador Extraordinary and Plenipotentiary of Ukraine.	Ambassador
16	2010	Vasyl Kyrylych		Ukrainian diplomat, Envoy Extraordinary and Minister Plenipotentiary. Author of more than 40 publications on ethnopolitics, Balkan studies and Eastern European issues. Author of the first Ukrainian diplomatic calendar (2007, 2017) and the study World about Ukraine and Ukrainians (2016). Candidate of Political Science, Associate Professor.	Chargé d'Affaires ad interim
17	2010–2014	Andrii Bereznyi		Ukrainian economist, diplomat.	Ambassador
18	2014–2021	Oleksandr Scherba		Ukrainian diplomat, Envoy Extraordinary and Minister Plenipotentiary, Ambassador Extraordinary and Plenipotentiary of Ukraine to Austria (since 2014).	Ambassador
19	2021	Vasil Himinets		Ambassador Extraordinary and Plenipotentiary of Ukraine to the Republic of Austria (since July 30, 2021)	Ambassador

== See also ==
- Austria–Ukraine relations
- List of diplomatic missions in Austria
- Foreign relations of Austria
- Foreign relations of Ukraine
- Ukraine–EU relations
