= Pavlo Klimkin =

Ukrainian diplomat

- Павло Клімкін
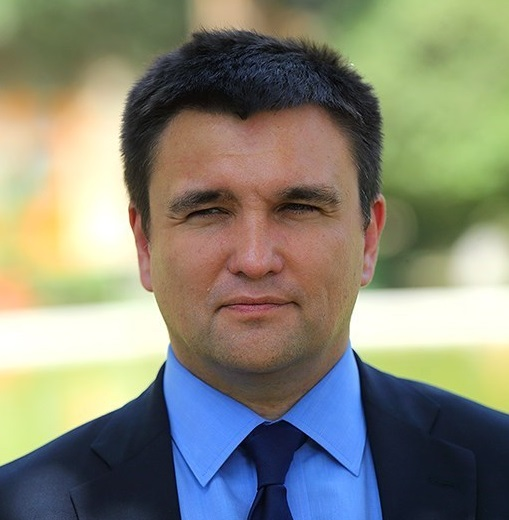
- Klimkin in 2016

Minister of Foreign Affairs
- In office 19 June 2014 – 29 August 2019
- President: Petro Poroshenko; Volodymyr Zelenskyy
- Prime Minister: Arseniy Yatsenyuk; Volodymyr Groysman
- Preceded by: Andrii Deshchytsia (Acting)
- Succeeded by: Vadym Prystaiko

Ukrainian Ambassador to Germany
- In office 22 June 2012 – 19 June 2014
- Preceded by: Natalia Zarudna
- Succeeded by: Andriy Melnyk

Personal details
- Born: 25 December 1967 (age 58) Kursk, Kursk Oblast, Russian SFSR, Soviet Union (now Russia)
- Party: Independent
- Spouse: Natalia Klimkina
- Children: 2 sons
- Education: Moscow Institute of Physics and Technology

Pavlo Anatoliiovych Klimkin (Ukrainian: Павло Анатолійович Клімкін; born 25 December 1967) is a Ukrainian diplomat who from 19 June 2014 until 29 August 2019 served as Minister of Foreign Affairs of Ukraine. A Moscow-educated physicist, he has worked in the Ukrainian Foreign Ministry since 1993, with positions including director of the department for the European Union, as well as deputy foreign minister in the First Azarov Government, where he played a central role in negotiating the Ukraine–European Union Association Agreement.

Klimkin is also a former (2012–2014) Ambassador Extraordinary and Plenipotentiary of Ukraine to Germany.

== Early life, education ==
Pavlo Klimkin was born on 25 December 1967 in the city of Kursk in Russia (then the Soviet Union); but spent only the first two months of his life there. In 1991 Klimkin graduated from the department of aerophysics and space research at Moscow Institute of Physics and Technology, with a specialist degree in physics and mathematics. Klimkin moved to Ukraine at the age of 24. He was then a research officer from 1991 to 1993 at the E. O. Paton Electric Welding Institute of the National Academy of Sciences of Ukraine.

== Political career ==
=== Early positions ===
In 1993, Klimkin started his career at the Ukrainian Foreign Ministry, where he would hold a variety of positions. Early on he served as an attaché and second secretary in the department of military control and disarmament, also working in the departments involved with German diplomacy, nuclear and energy security, and economics. By 1997 he was working directly for the future Vice Prime Minister Kostiantyn Hryshchenko, who would later appoint Klimkin as his deputy minister.

Klimkin was appointed Minister-Counselor of the Ukrainian Embassy in the United Kingdom in 2004, a position he held until 2008. In March 2008 he was named the Ukrainian Foreign Ministry's director for their European Union department.

On 21 April 2010, he became Deputy Foreign Minister in the First Azarov Government of Ukraine. As deputy Klimkin played a central role in negotiating the Ukraine–European Union Association Agreement, particularly in its early stages in 2012. According to Gazeta.ru, during those years Klimkin was "the face of European integration of Ukraine," as he led a delegation of negotiators with the EU. According to Ukrainska Pravda, the rejection of European integration with Ukraine in November 2013 was "a personal disappointment to Klimkin, who dedicated many months of his life to [the] issue."

=== Ambassador to Germany ===
He served as both Deputy Foreign Minister and Chief of Staff of the Ukrainian Foreign Ministry until 22 June 2012, when he was appointed Ambassador of Ukraine to Germany. As ambassador he has been influential in a number of international negotiations; in early June 2014, that included talks to stop the fighting in eastern Ukraine, when he met with Heidi Tagliavini of the Organization for Security and Co-operation in Europe and the Russian Ambassador to Ukraine, Mikhail Zurabov. According to AFP news agency, "The talks have since produced a peace initiative that includes Poroshenko's ceasefire proposal and the introduction of a new constitution that gives broader rights to Ukraine's regions - a key Moscow demand."

=== Minister of Foreign Affairs ===
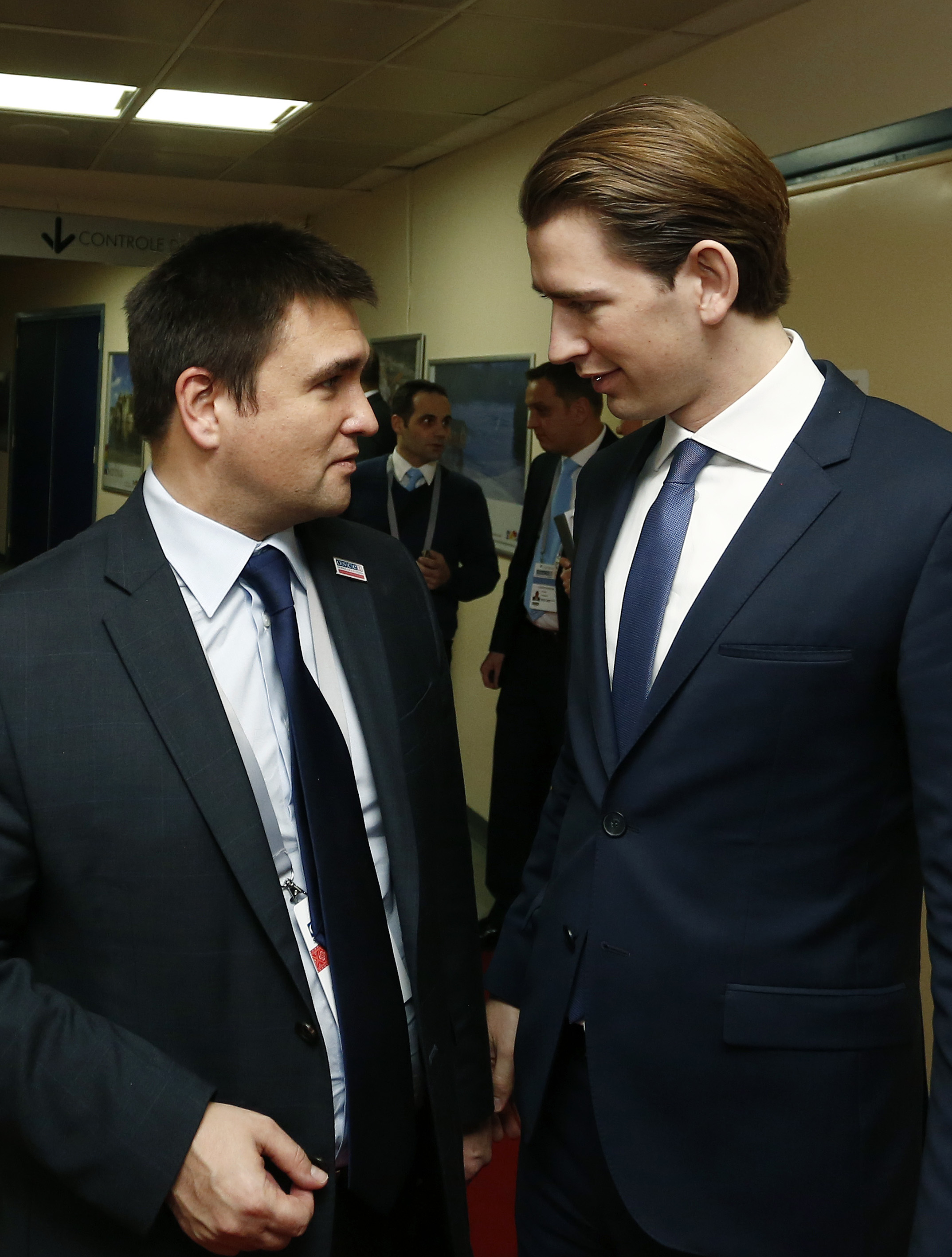
Klimkin meeting Austrian foreign minister Sebastian Kurz, 3 December 2015

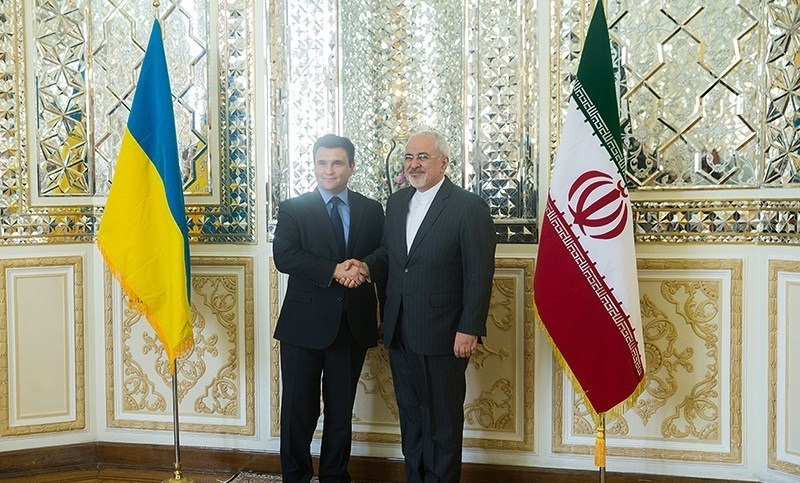
Klimkin meeting Iranian foreign minister Mohammad Javad Zarif, 28 May 2016

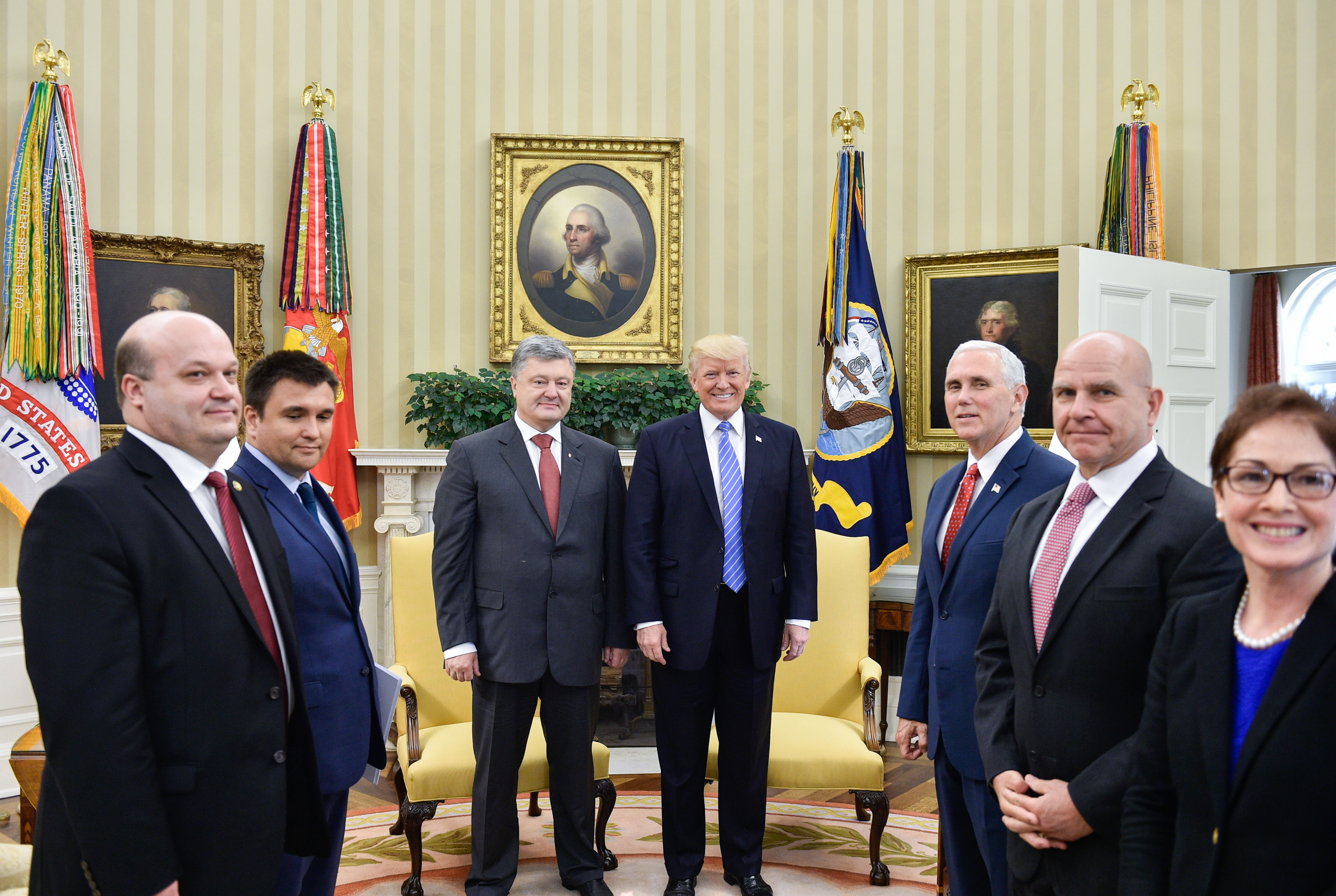
Klimkin with U.S. President Donald Trump and Ukrainian President Petro Poroshenko in Washington D.C., 20 June 2017

==== Appointment ====
In early June 2014, Klimkin's candidacy for the Minister of Foreign Affairs of Ukraine was proposed by Petro Poroshenko, the recently appointed Ukrainian President. On 19 June 2014, 335 MPs of the Verkhovna Rada (Ukraine's parliament) voted for his appointment. This made his approval unanimous, excluding the 35-member faction "Freedom," which didn't vote entirely. Klimkin was sworn in that day.

His appointment was met with voiced approval by academics such as Hryhorii Nemyria, and that day Klimkin was congratulated by phone by foreign ministers such as Laurent Fabius of France, John Baird of Canada, and Frank-Walter Steinmeier of Germany. He also met with the OSCE chairman, Heidi Tagliavini.

Russia's Deputy Foreign Minister, Grigory Karasin, stated on 19 June that "we wish the new minister success and are ready for contact with him," also stating that Klimkin is known in their department as a "skilled diplomat." The following day, Klimkin and the Russian Foreign Minister, Sergey Lavrov, discussed "measures to resolve Ukraine's crisis" on the phone, focusing on Poroshenko's peace plan and controlling the Ukrainian border.

==== Policies as minister ====
According to the AFP news agency, Klimkin's appointment "is seen as a step toward better [Ukrainian] relations with Russia." Also, according to NBC, Klimkin is "Committed to European integration [with Ukraine and] he has played a key role in negotiating the association and free trade agreements with the European Union, which Ukraine is expected to sign later [in June 2014]."

On 29 Augustus 2019 Vadym Prystaiko replaced Klimkin as Foreign Minister of Ukraine.

== Personal life ==
Klimkin was married to a fellow diplomat, Natalia, and has two sons. Natalia Klimkina holds the post of first secretary of the Embassy of Ukraine in the Netherlands and is responsible for policy issues and culture. His second wife is Maryna Mykhaylenko, the daughter of a Russian Major General Yury Mykhaylenko. Beyond Russian and Ukrainian, Klimkin is fluent in English and German and has a basic knowledge of French and Spanish. He has the rank of Ambassador Extraordinary and Plenipotentiary of Ukraine.

=== Earnings ===
According to an electronic declaration, in 2019, Pavlo Klimkin received salary of ₴553,904 (US$20,515) as Minister of Foreign Affairs of Ukraine and ₴31,253 (US$1,158) as other payments under civil law contracts. On bank accounts (Savings Bank), Klimkin had ₴2,823 (US$105) and €826. Klimkin also declared US$24,000 and €2,000 in cash. Additionally, Klimkin also declared an apartment (total area of 68,20 m²) and apartment (total area of 108,30 m²) under joint ownership. Klimkin also declared a 2000 Skoda Felicia car and a 2019 Mazda CX 5 car.

== See also ==
- List of foreign ministers in 2017
- List of current foreign ministers

Political offices
Preceded by Andrii Deshchytsia; Acting	Minister of Foreign Affairs; 2014–2019	Succeeded by Vadym Prystaiko
