= Oleksii Makeiev =

Ukrainian ambassador to Germany

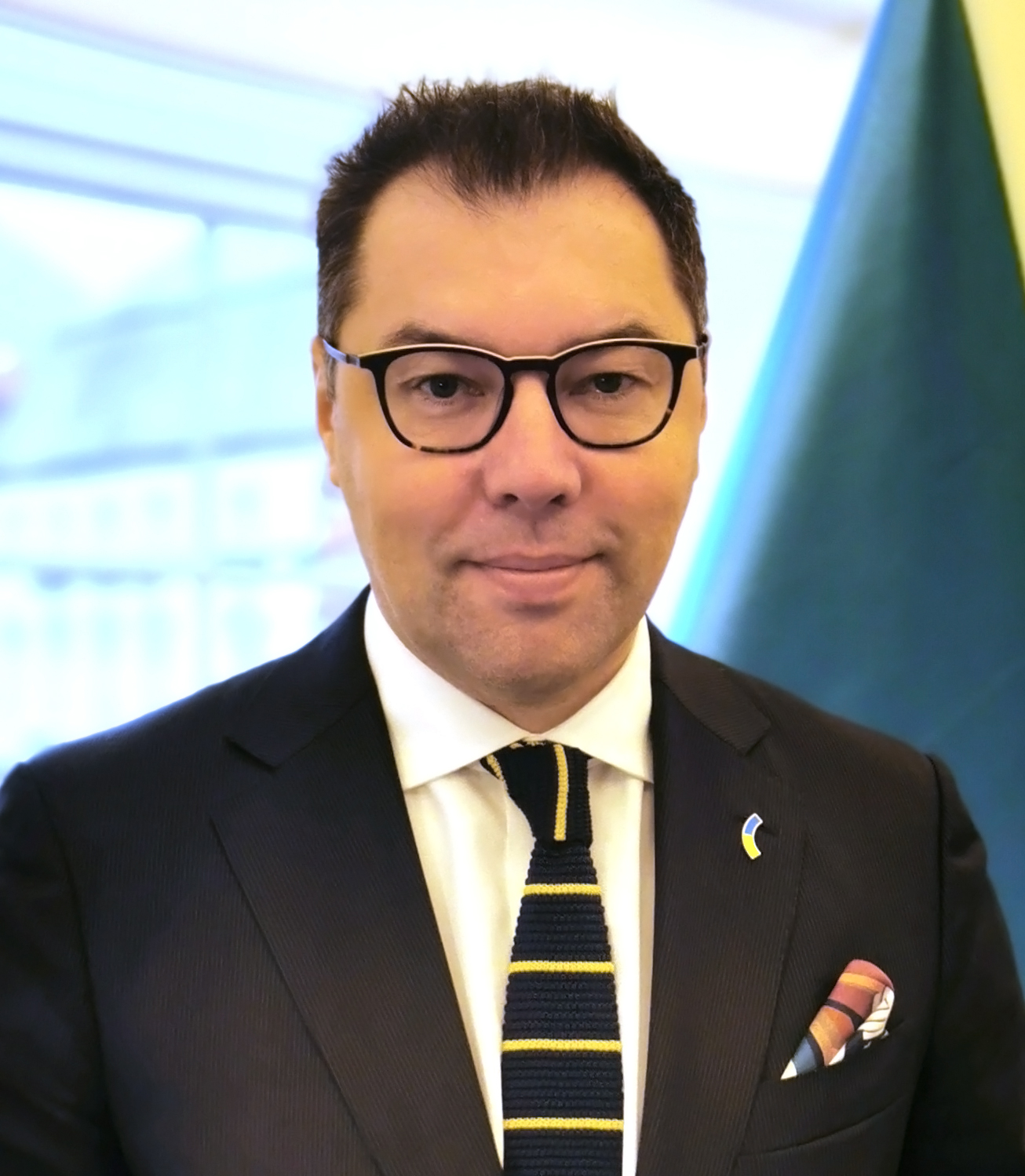

Ambassador of Ukraine to Germany
- Incumbent
- Assumed office 23 September 2022
- President: Volodymyr Zelenskyy
- Prime Minister: Denys Shmyhal
- Preceded by: Andriy Melnyk

Personal details
- Born: 25 November 1975 (age 50) Kyiv, Ukrainian SSR, Soviet Union (now Ukraine)
- Education: Taras Shevchenko National University of Kyiv

Oleksii Serhiiovych Makeiev (born 25 November 1975 in Kyiv) is a Ukrainian diplomat who has been serving as Ambassador of Ukraine to Germany under President Volodymyr Zelenskyy since 23 September 2022.

== Early life and education ==
Oleksii Makeiev was born on 25 November 1975 in Kyiv. He graduated from the Institute of International Relations at Taras Shevchenko National University of Kyiv in 1997.

== Career ==
Makeiev began his diplomatic career at the Ministry of Foreign Affairs in 1996. Prior to 2014, he worked at Ukraine's diplomatic missions in Germany and Switzerland. He was made political director of the Ministry of Foreign Affairs of Ukraine in 2014. As political director, he was involved in the negotiation of the Minsk agreements with Russia, Germany, and France. In 2020, he became the special representative for sanctions policy.

== Personal life ==
Oleksii Makeiev is married to Olena Makeieva, who was deputy minister of finance from 2015 to 2016. They have one daughter.

Makeiev is fluent in English, German, and Russian. He can also speak French and Spanish.
