= Roman Smal-Stocki =

- Роман Смаль-Стоцький
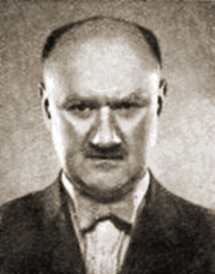

Ambassador of Ukraine to Germany
- In office 1920–1923
- President: Symon Petliura
- Preceded by: Mykola Porsh
- Succeeded by: Mykola von Wassilko

Personal details
- Born: January 8, 1893 Chernivtsi
- Died: April 27, 1969 Washington, D.C.
- Education: Vienna University

Roman Stepanovych Smal-Stocki (Роман Степанович Смаль-Стоцький) (born: January 8, 1893, Chernivtsi - died April 27, 1969, Washington DC) – was a Ukrainian diplomat, scholar, politician. Ph.D. Professor at the Ukrainian Free University. President of the Supreme Council of the Shevchenko Scientific Society and the Scientific Society in the United States.

He is a son of Ukrainian slavist Stepan Smal-Stotsky.

== Education ==
Roman Smal-Stocki graduated from Vienna University (1914).

== Publications ==
- Smal-Stocki, Roman. The Nationality Problem of the Soviet Union.
- Smal-Stocki, Roman, 1893-1969: Abriss der ukrainischen Substantivbildung. (Wien, Buchhandlung der Szewczenko-Gesellschaft der Wissenschaften in Lemberg, 1915)
- Smal-Stocki, Roman, 1893-1969: Abriss der Ukrainischen Substantivbildung. (Wien, 1915)
- The captive nations: nationalism of the non-Russian nations in the Soviet Union. Smal-Stocki, Roman, 1893-1969. Book, 1960.
- Ukraïnska mova v Sovetskyĭ Ukrainy by Smal-Stocki, Roman, 1893-1969: 1969, Book
- The Slavic Institute of Marquette University, 1949-1961, by Roman Smal-Stocki and Alfred J. Sokolnicki.
- The Origin of the Word 'Rus'. 1949.
- Slavs and Teutons. The oldest Germanic-Slavic Relations, 1950
- The Nationality Problem of the Soviet Union and Russian Communist Imperialism, 1952
- J. S. C. de Radius. An unknown Forerunner of Comparative Slavic Literature, 1959
- Manning, Clarence A.; Smal-Stocki, Roman (1960). The History Of Modern Bulgarian Literature. Westport, Connecticut: Greenwood Publishers – via Internet Archive.
