= Teodor Shteingel =

Ukrainian archaeologist, philanthropist and nationalist politician

Baron Teodor Shteinhel
- Федір Рудольфович Штейнгель
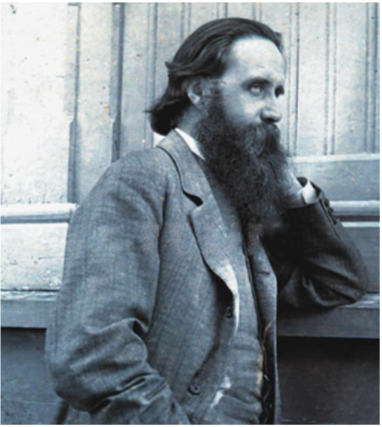
- Born: December 9, 1870; Saint Petersburg, Russian Empire
- Died: April 11, 1946 (aged 75)
- Burial place: Dresden, Occupied Germany
- Other name: Theodor von Steinheil (German)
- Citizenship: Russian Empire, UNR, Ukrainian State
- Known for: sociopolitical and cultural influence, philanthropy
- Political party: KDP; Society of Ukrainian Progressists; UPSF; Peasant Russia; Workers' Peasant Party

Signature
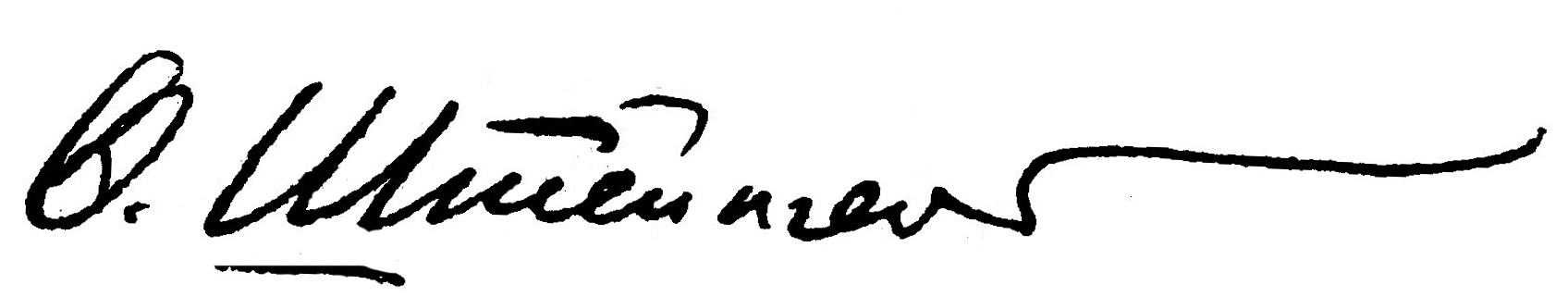

Baron Teodor Shteinhel (Ukrainian: Федір (Теодор) Штейнгель, Fedir (Teodor) Shteinhel; Russian: Фёдор Рудольфович Штейнгель, Fyodor Rudolphovich Shteingel; German: Theodor von Steinheil, 9 December 1870, Saint Petersburg – 11 April 1946 Dresden) was a Ukrainian archaeologist, philanthropist, politician and diplomat.

After graduating from Kyiv University, Steinheil established a school, hospital, co-operative, and reading room in Horodok (modern Rivne Oblast). In 1902, he contributed the Horodok Museum, where he deposited his archeological, historical, and ethnographic collections. Steinheil took part in archaeological excavations of burials from the times of Kyivan Rus in Volhynia. He also organized the production of sound recordings of Ukrainian folklore, such as koliadkas and vertep dramas, as well as traditional music of Ukraine's Jews.

In 1906 he was elected as deputy for Kyiv to the First State Duma where he joined the Ukrainian caucus. Steinheil became a member of the Society of Ukrainian Progressionists and vice-president of the Ukrainian Scientific Society. Following the February Revolution of 1917 he chaired the executive committee of the Kyiv City Duma, the forerunner of the Central Rada. In 1918 Steinheil was sent as a diplomatic envoy to Berlin by the Ukrainian Hetmanate. On that post he supported ties with diplomats of neutral states such as Spain and Netherlands. He subsequently returned to Western Ukraine in the twenties but left for Germany in 1939, settling near Dresden, where he died in 1946.

== Gallery ==
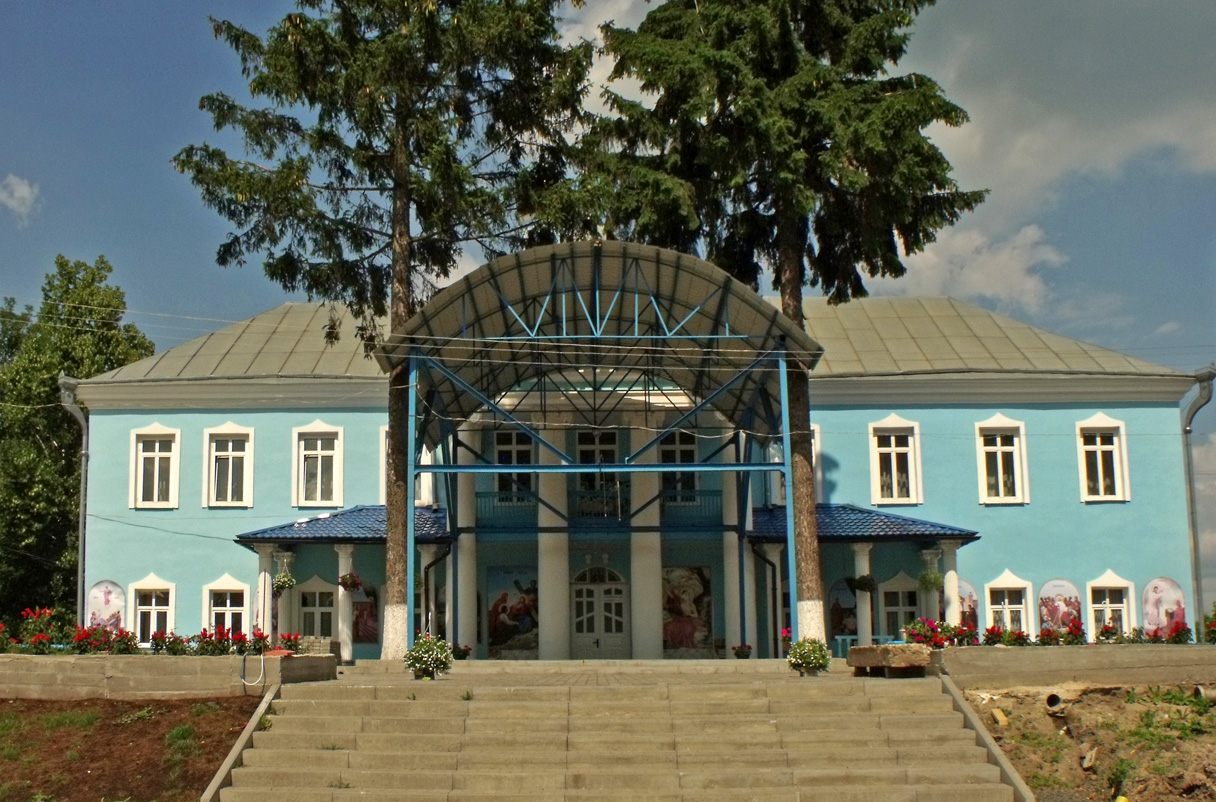
Shteingel's palace in Horodok, now part of the St. Nicholas Convent

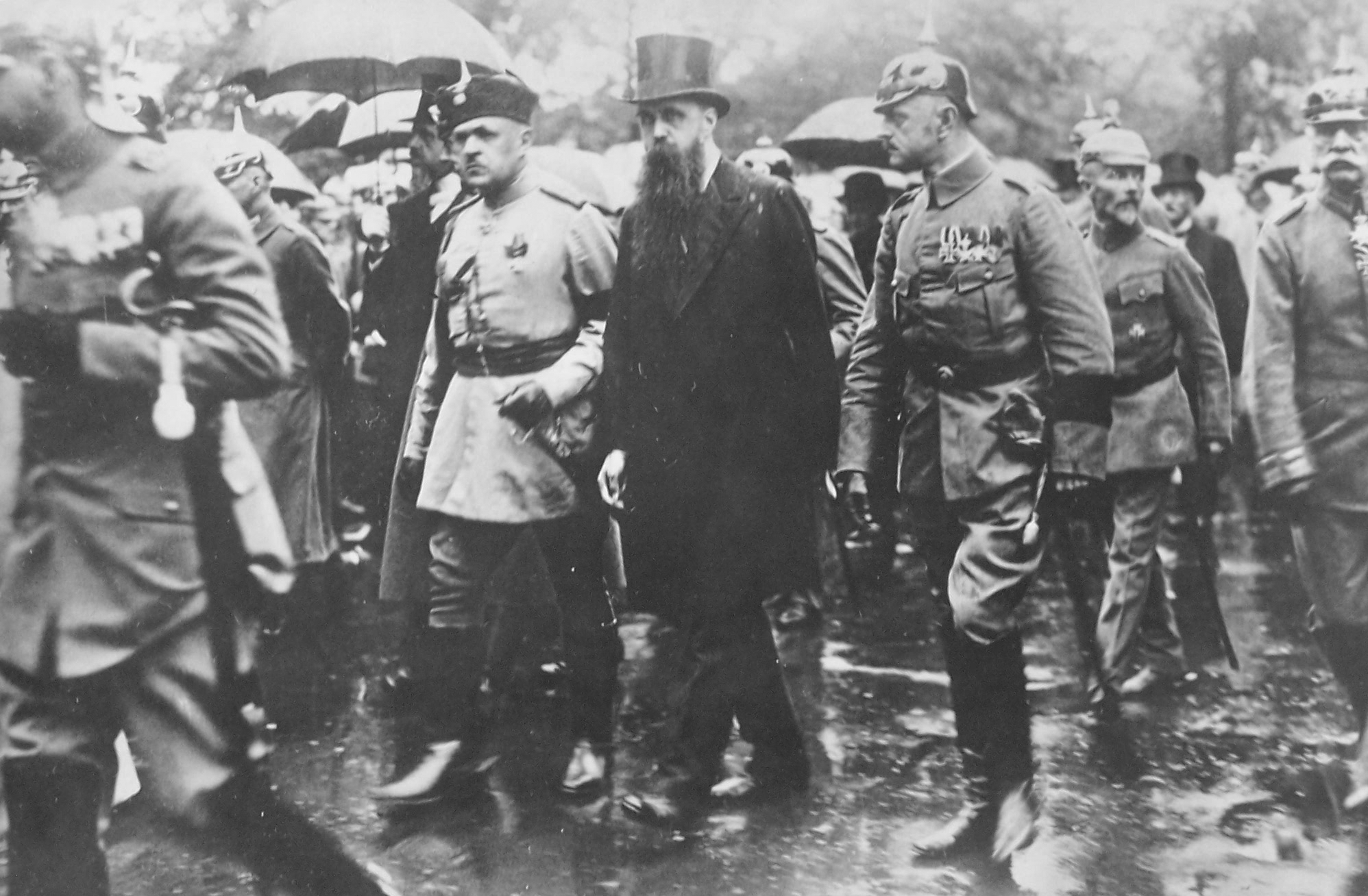
Ambassadors of Turkey (Rifat Pasha) and Ukraine (Teodor Shteingel) at the funeral of Hermann von Eichhorn

== See also ==
- Volhynian Germans
