= Herbert von Dirksen =

German diplomat (1882–1955)

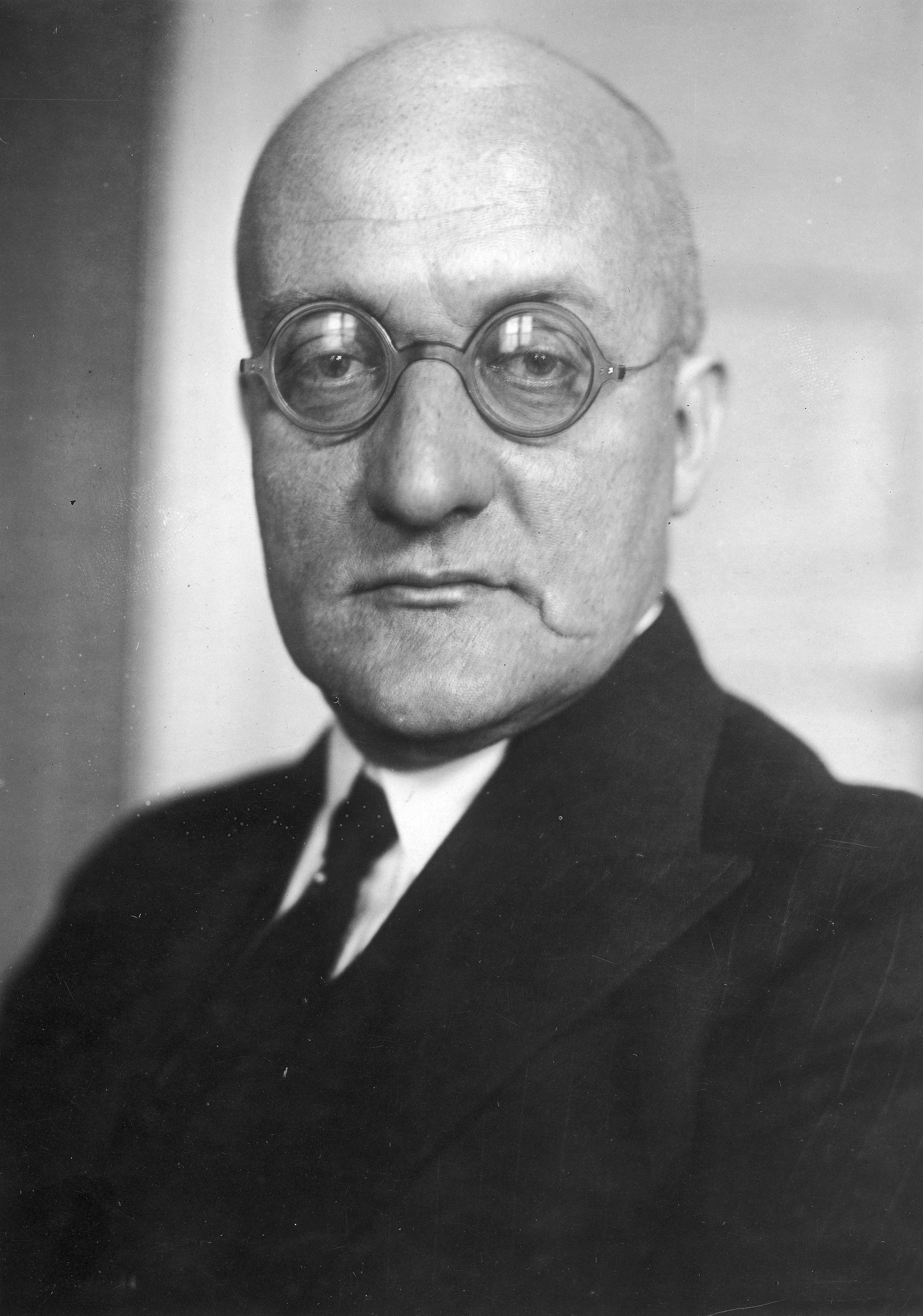
- Dirksen, taken before 1928
- Born: 2 April 1882; Berlin, Kingdom of Prussia, German Empire
- Died: 19 December 1955 (aged 73); Munich, Bavaria, West Germany
- Occupation: Diplomat
- Political party: Nazi Party
- Other political affiliations: DNVP
- Father: Willibald von Dirksen
- Relatives: Diego von Bergen (brother-in-law); Heinrich Eduard Dirksen (great-grandfather); Viktoria von Dirksen (stepmother)

Eduard Willy Kurt Herbert von Dirksen (2 April 1882 – 19 December 1955) was a German writer, lawyer, landowner, art collector, and career diplomat who occupied several key roles during the interwar period, serving as the German ambassador to the Soviet Union (1928–1933), ambassador to Japan (1933–1938), and most notably as the last German ambassador to Britain prior to the outbreak of World War II.

Hailing from a well-off Prussian Junker family, Dirksen studied law and worked as an assistant judge before going on a world tour and choosing to become a diplomat. During World War I he was an administrator in German-occupied Belgium before being transferred to the Foreign Office in 1917. Over of the course of the Polish–Soviet War, Dirksen was the de facto ambassador to Poland, but his open hostility towards the new Polish state led him to leave the position. He played a major role in shaping Germany's eastern policy for much of the Weimar period, pushing for a revision of the country's borders while trying to avoid war with Britain and France.

A pragmatist, Herbert von Dirksen frequently clashed with the Hitler government over issues of foreign affairs, with the Foreign Office gradually being marginalized by other agencies. The Nazi ascension to power in 1933 led to an immediate initial breakdown in German–Soviet relations, much to Dirksen's chagrin. He later served as the ambassador to Japan where he pushed for closer relations, but was sidelined during the actual Anti-Comintern Pact negotiations by the Hitler loyalist Joachim von Ribbentrop. When Ribbentrop was made Reich Minister for Foreign Affairs in 1938, Dirksen filled in his role as Germany's chief representative in London where he tried unsuccessfully to maintain British neutrality over Poland. The United Kingdom's newfound resolve to contain German expansion and Hitler's dismissiveness ultimately led Dirksen to resign and retire at the outbreak of war in 1939.

== Parvenu nobleman ==
Dirksen was born on 2 April 1882 in Berlin to Karl Ernst Eduard Willibald and Marie Helene Elisabeth von Dirksen (née von Schnitzler), a family whose members had served as Prussian civil servants for generations. His father was ennobled by Emperor Wilhelm I in 1887, which allowed them both to add the nobiliary particle von to their surnames. In the same degree that ennobled him, Willibald von Dirksen was granted a large estate together with Gröditzberg Castle in Silesia as a reward for his services to the House of Hohenzollern. Willibald was a conservative nationalist who, after his retirement, held a seat in the Reichstag for the Free Conservative Party and was described as a "fanatical admirer" of Wilhelm II, whom he visited regularly while in exile in the Netherlands. Dirksen's stepmother, Viktoria, came from a wealthy banking family and was once helpful to Adolf Hitler, which benefited Dirksen's career during Nazi Germany. In his 1952 memoirs, Dirksen boasted that he was "proud of my purely Germanic blood", as the Dirksen family had been ennobled in 1887 "before a whole batch of more or less Jew-tainted families were ennobled by the liberalistic Emperor Frederick III" in 1888.

As the Dirksens were parvenu nobility unlike the ancient Junker families, they were insecure about their social standing, and from the age of five onward, Herbert was forced to undergo a strict training regime to produce an "exemplary bearing" meant to allow him to be accepted by the Junkers. Dirksen had wanted to enter the exclusive Auswärtiges Amt (Foreign Office), but his father forced him to enter the Prussian civil service instead to prepare him for eventually managing the family estate in Silesia. As a university student at Heidelberg, the snobbish Dirksen joined Corps Saxo-Borussia Heidelberg, an exclusive fraternity with a largely aristocratic membership, which was a source of considerable pride to him. In 1905, he graduated with a legal degree as a Referendar, and in 1907, he went on a tour around the world. After graduation from university, Dirksen become a reserve officer with the 3rd Guards Uhlan regiment, based in Potsdam, which he always noted accepted only men from the aristocracy as officers. After working as an assistant judge, in 1910, Dirksen went on a four-month trip to Rhodesia, South Africa and German East Africa (modern Tanzania), where he was thinking about settling.

During World War I, Dirksen served in the Imperial German Army as a lieutenant and won the Iron Cross, Second Class. The American historian Carl Schorske described Dirksen as a "correct and proper aristocrat with the right connections" but also a man who was slavishly loyal to those who held power. Entering the Auswärtiges Amt in 1917, Dirksen served in the Hague (1917), Kiev (1918–1919), and in Warsaw (1920–1921).

== The Enemy of Poland ==
In April 1920, von Dirksen arrived in Warsaw to take up the post of chargé d'Affaires. As the Chargé d'Affaires of the German embassy in Warsaw, von Dirksen's relations with the Poles were extremely difficult. As Germany then had no ambassador stationed at its embassy in Warsaw, von Dirksen as the Chargé d'Affaires was in effect the ambassador to Poland; a measure of his antipathy to Poles can be seen in that the chapter of his 1950 Memoirs dealing with his time in Warsaw, virtually all of von Dirksen's comments about Poland and Poles are negative. In his memoirs, von Dirksen wrote that he "shared the deep-seated feeling of superiority over the Pole inherent in the German". In May 1921, a plebiscite to decide the status of Upper Silesia led to fighting between the Germans and Poles in Upper Silesia - the latter having instigated an armed insurrection assisted by Haller's army in Poland proper - who were supported by their respective national governments, causing strained relations between Berlin and Warsaw. Allied troops had to be sent to restore order. As someone who had grown in Silesia, von Dirksen's sympathies were completely with the German side, which led him to insist that all of Silesia belonged to Germany and none of the parts of Upper Silesia that voted to join Poland should be allowed to leave the Reich. In October 1921, von Dirksen left Warsaw to head up the Polish desk at the Auswärtiges Amt.

From May 1923 to February 1925, Dirksen served as German Consul in the Free City of Danzig (modern Gdańsk, Poland). Under Point 14 of Woodrow Wilson's Fourteen Points, it had been announced that Poland should have its independence restored with secure access to the Baltic Sea. Taking up Point 14, the Poles had pressed at the Paris Peace Conference to annex Danzig, a city that was 95% German, but instead, the Allies compromised by creating the Free City of Danzig, an independent city-state that was under the protection of the League of Nations, to which Poland was granted certain special rights. Most people in Danzig wished to rejoin Germany while the Poles were unwilling to see any change in Danzig's status. As German consul in Danzig, Dirksen often clashed with the Poles. As consul in Danzig, Dirksen played a prominent role in the "postbox war"—a lengthy struggle over whether the postboxes in Danzig should be painted red and white (the colors of Poland) or red, white and black (the colors of the right in Germany; red, black and yellow are the colors of the left in Germany)—the latter selection of colors was a sign of the right-wing inclinations of the senate that governed the Free City of Danzig.

As the head of the Polish sub-desk within the Eastern Desk at the Auswärtiges Amt, Dirksen played a key role as an aide to foreign minister Gustav Stresemann in formulating German policy towards Poland, and in 1925 Dirksen was one of the leading advocates of using economic pressure to force Poland to return the Polish Corridor, Danzig and Upper Silesia to Germany. At the beginning of 1925, Dirksen wrote that Poland would only return the Polish Corridor and Upper Silesia if Poland was "weak", which led him to suggest that Germany together with the "Anglo-Saxon powers" should follow a strategy of weakening the Polish economy to make Poland as militarily as weak as possible. Although the Auswärtiges Amt knew in fact that there was no evidence that Poland was seeking war with Germany, the Wilhelmstrasse seized upon any rumors of Polish military movements towards the German frontier to portray Poland as an aggressive and expansionist state that was a menace to the peace of Europe, which was part of a broader public relations campaign waged in Europe and the United States that emphasized the theme of "Polish chauvinism and racial hatred". Dirksen had successfully argued that Germany's chances of regaining the Polish Corridor, Danzig, and Upper Silesia would be better if world opinion was turned against Poland.

In a debate within Auswärtiges Amt, Carl Schubert, the State Secretary of the Auswärtiges Amt, argued against making loans to Poland conditional on the return of the lost territories, writing that "only force" would force the Poles to return the Corridor and Upper Silesia. Schubert argued that since war with Poland was not practical at the moment, Germany should make loans to Poland under onerous conditions with high-interest rates to weaken Poland economically and thereby reduce the Polish military budget until such a time when Germany was rearmed, at which point Germany would take back the lost lands via war. Dirksen by contrast also agreed that taking back the lands lost to Poland was "inconceivable without force", but he argued that any sort of German loans to Poland would strengthen Poland, and successfully maintained to Stresemann that Germany should not make any loans to Poland and should also try to persuade other nations not to makes loans to Poland. Following Dirksen's recommendation, Stresemann ordered Friedrich Sthamer, the German ambassador to the Court of St. James's, to lobby Montagu Norman, the governor of the Bank of England, to ask him to pressure British banks into not making any loans to Poland. In this, Sthamer was successful, reporting to Berlin that Norman felt that the Treaty of Versailles was too harsh on Germany and he was willing to support German efforts to revise Versailles by denying Poland loans.

In November 1925, Dirksen lamented that war with Poland was not possible because of the Treaty of Versailles, which had disarmed Germany and because of the Franco-Polish alliance, saying if only Germany was rearmed, then he would be all for launching a war against Poland at once. In a memo to Stresemann on 29 December 1925, Dirksen argued that Germany should annex all of the parts of Poland that had belonged to Germany in 1914, and went on to vent his anti-Polish feelings, saying that he loathed all Poles. Unlike Stresemann, who was willing to leave the city of Poznań to the Poles, writing that Germany's chances of regaining the mostly German city of Danzig would be higher if the Germans were willing to renounce their claim on the mostly Polish city of Poznań, Dirksen was adamant that Posen, as he insisted on calling Poznań, had been German and would be so again, writing he did not feel that Germany should compromise in any way on its claims on the lands that once been German and that the frontier should be "rounded off" somewhere to the east. When Germany signed an arbitration treaty with Poland in 1926, Dirksen noted this only meant renouncing war with Poland was "for the time being", noting that from the German viewpoint the value of the treaty was only for public relations as to help portray Germany as the peaceful partner in relations with Poland.

== Ambassador to the Soviet Union ==
In 1928, in a major promotion, Dirksen became the Ministerial Director of the East Division of the Foreign Office. On 28 January 1928, Dirksen attended a secret conference in Berlin with General Werner von Blomberg of the Truppenamt (the disguised General Staff), who was pressing for an invasion of Poland later that year; which Dirksen argued against, stating that under the present international conditions, "a German-Polish war without the intervention of France or the other powers" was very unlikely. Dirksen had to politely advise Blomberg that his belief that the "spirit of Locarno" had improved Franco-German relations to such an extent that France would disregard its alliance with Poland should Germany invade the latter country was an illusion.

Later in 1928, Foreign Minister Gustav Stresemann appointed Dirksen as Germany's Ambassador to the Soviet Union. In his memoirs, Dirksen wrote that the Soviet Union and Germany "shared the same fate", writing: "Both had been vanquished in the war, both were being treated as outcasts by the Allied powers. Both felt resentment or enmity to their new neighbor Poland...Both were convinced that a give-and-take was mutually adventurous". However, Dirksen's views towards the Soviets were entirely pragmatic, as he went on to write that as a German and therefore a "civilized European", he only felt "contempt and abhorrence" towards Communism and Russians. Dirksen supported the Soviet efforts to help Germany break the terms of the Treaty of Versailles by developing weapons that Versailles had forbidden Germany to have such as tanks and aircraft, but he wanted the German-Soviet military co-operation kept within its "proper limits". Since 1926, when the secret German-Soviet co-operation had become public knowledge following an exposé by The Manchester Guardian, the subject was a contentious one that had strained relations with France, who did not appreciate Germany breaking Versailles to develop forbidden weapons that would one day be used against France. Dirksen wanted the development of weapons in the Soviet Union to be handled by private German companies working for the German state as much as possible, fearing that more revelations of German covert rearmament in the Soviet Union would cause too many difficulties with the French, and hinder German efforts to have Versailles revised in its favor. From the German viewpoint, convincing France that Germany did not plan to start another world war was the key to the efforts to revise Versailles, and the fact that covert rearmament was going on in the Soviet Union was not helpful to this campaign.

In his first speech in Moscow, in January 1929, Dirksen hailed the First Five Year Plan, and promised that Germany would do everything within its power to help the Soviet state achieve the targets set out by the plan. Dirksen's relations with the Soviet Commissar for Foreign Affairs Georgy Chicherin were good as he regarded Chicherin as pro-German. However, in 1930, when Maxim Litvinov replaced Chicherin, Dirksen made no secret of his dislike for Litvinov whom he charged was not really a follower of the Rapallo policy as Chicherin had been and moreover was a Jew. However, Dirksen argued in his memoirs that Litvinov's "anti-German" foreign policy inclinations had little influence on Joseph Stalin until 1933. In 1930–31, Dirksen negotiated a set of long-term credits for German businesses willing to sell machinery to the Soviet Union.

Despite's Dirksen's best efforts, German-Soviet relations did not develop as well as he hoped. Stresemann had often used the threat of Germany leaning east towards the Soviet Union as a way of getting concessions from Britain and France in his campaign to revise the Treaty of Versailles, and by the early 1930s, the Soviets had grown tired of the way in which the Germans used the threat of friendship with them for their own purposes. Moreover, by the early 1930s, the German Protestant middle classes were gripped with the fear that the German Communist Party would use the great unemployed masses made available by the Great Depression to stage a revolution, which caused much of the Protestant middle class, starting in 1930 to vote Nazi as the "party of order" that would crush Marxism in Germany. In 1930, the German Foreign Minister Julius Curtius warned Dirksen that as long as the Kremlin supported the KPD, and as long as the German middle classes were obsessed with the fear of a communist revolution, which Curtius complained was being fanned by a hysterical campaign in the conservative German press which vastly exaggerated the dangers of a communist revolution in Germany, the Reich would have to keep a certain distance from the Soviet Union. Furthermore, Curtius noted that reports (which were true) that the Volga Germans were suffering terribly because of the policies of forced collectivization imposed by the First Five Year Plan made it politically toxic for Germany to get too close to the Soviet Union. Dirksen still saw the Soviet Union as a "counterweight to the West" and urged Curtius not to turn back completely on an eastern pivot, writing that the main enemy was still Poland, and the Soviet Union was useful as a potential ally against the Poles.

Hitler inspired a fierce maternal love in older, upper-class women, and in the 1920s the phenomena of the "Hitler Mother" emerged. The "Hitler Mothers" were older women, invariably from a well off background, who pampered Hitler like a son, indulging him with his favorite teas and chocolates. Dirksen's mother became a "Hitler Mother", launching a salon where Hitler could meet all of her upper-class friends, and as well as her son, the German ambassador to the Soviet Union.

In early 1933, Dirksen was highly concerned that the anti-Communist rhetoric of the Nazis might damage the relatively good state of German-Soviet relations. In response, Prince Bernhard von Bülow, the State Secretary of the Auswärtiges Amt, sought to reassure Dirksen: "The National Socialists faced with responsibility are naturally different people and follow a policy other than that which they have previously proclaimed. That's always been so and is the same with all parties". Despite Bülow's assessment, German–Soviet relations started to decline, which left Dirksen very worried. Schorske called Dirksen "...more than a loyal civil servant to the Nazis-a true if not ardent believer in Hitler". In May 1933, Dirksen had a meeting with Hitler in which he advised the Führer that he was allowing relations with the Soviet Union to deteriorate to an unacceptable extent. Much to Dirksen's disappointment, Hitler informed him that he wished for an anti-Soviet understanding with Poland, which Dirksen protested implied recognition of the German–Polish border. The American historian Gerhard Weinberg described Dirksen as "...a vain and pompous man who believed strongly in German co-operation with whatever country he was assigned to at the moment. His memory was sometimes poor, and his predictions frequently erroneous, but his observations on the situation in countries to which he was accredited were generally accurate...Like Neurath, Dirksen wanted to maintain tension with Poland to push for revision; Hitler preferred to wait until he was ready for wider schemes."

In his memoirs, Dirksen argued that there were two factions in the Narkomindel, a "pro-French" faction and a "pro-German" faction, and it was not until Alfred Hugenberg's speech at the London Economic Conference in June 1933, where he argued for Germany's right to colonize the Soviet Union, that the issue was decided for the "pro-French" group. In August 1933, Dirksen was warned by the Soviet Premier Vyacheslav Molotov that the state of German–Soviet relations would depend on how friendly the Reich chose to be towards the Soviet Union. In September 1933, a major crisis occurred in German-Soviet relations when journalists from Tass and Izvestia covering the Reichstag Fire trial in Leipzig were beaten up by the SA, and Hitler's response to Soviet note of protest against the assault of the Soviet journalists was to explicitly threaten to expel all Soviet journalists from the Reich if he ever received another note of protest again and implicitly threaten to break off diplomatic relations with the Soviet Union . After being warned by the Auswärtiges Amt that trade with the Soviet Union provided Germany with raw materials needed for rearmament, Hitler took certain steps to reduce tension with the Soviet Union and did not break off diplomatic relations with Moscow as he was considering doing, but at the same time, Hitler made it clear that "a restoration of the German-Russian relationship would be impossible". As Dirksen continued to press Hitler for a rapprochement with the Soviet Union, Hitler decided to make him his new ambassador in Japan.

== Ambassador to Japan ==
In October 1933, he became the German Ambassador to Japan. On 18 October 1933, Dirksen had met Hitler and gained the impression that Hitler favoured the recognition of Manchukuo. Hitler had met Dirksen at Gröditzberg Castle, in Silesia. Shortly after his arrival in Tokyo, Dirksen became involved with the efforts of a shady German businessman, drug dealer, Nazi Party member and friend of Hermann Göring, Ferdinand Heye, to become Special Trade Commissioner in Manchukuo. Dirksen's backing for Heye's schemes for a monopoly of Manchurian soybeans and his advocacy of German recognition of Manchukuo brought him into conflict with his superior, Foreign Minister Baron Konstantin von Neurath, who preferred closer relations to China than to Japan. The question of recognition of Manchukuo was a litmus test for relations with both Japan and China. Against Dirksen's advocacy of recognizing Manchukuo, Neurath countered that Germany did far more trade with China than Manchukuo and so recognising Manchukuo would damage Germany's relations with China. On 18 December 1933, Dirksen was invited by the Japanese to visit Manchukuo to meet Emperor Puyi, an invitation that Dirksen wanted to take up, but the projected visit to Manchukuo was vetoed by Neurath. Instead, Dirksen sent his economic counselor to Manchukuo to meet Puyi, a meeting that was widely taken to indicate that Germany would soon recognise Manchukuo, which prompted furious protests from China.

After Dirksen's lobbying, Heye was appointed by Hitler to be his special trade commissioner in Manchukuo and given the authority to negotiate a trade agreement with Manchukuo, but Hitler in a communiqué denied that recognition of Manchukuo was imminent. Dirksen was informed by Neurath that German policy was not to recognise Manchukuo but to seek whatever trade advantages that might be gained. In early 1934, Dirksen himself came into conflict with Heye over the latter's attempts to secure not just a soybean monopoly, but over all German business in Manchuria. Despite the setback caused by the Heye affair, Dirksen continued his pro-Japanese line by declaring his sympathy for Japan's plans for the Greater East Asia Co-prosperity Sphere in return for which he expected German corporations to be allowed to play a prominent role. Supporters a pro-Chinese policy in the Auswärtiges Amt often countered Dirksen that Japan tended to exclude all foreign corporations from operating, which led them to doubt Dirksen's claims that Germany would profit from the Greater East Asia Co-prosperity Sphere. As Special Trade Commissioner, Heye told the Japanese that Germany would soon recognise Manchukuo and that he would be the first German ambassador in Xinjing (now Changchun, China). Heye wanted monopoly over not only soybeans but also all German business and investments in Manchukuo, which would be through a corporation run by himself and the industrialist Fritz Thyssen, who would charge German firms operating in Manchukuo a 10% fee on all profits that they made in Manchukuo. In addition, Heye, acting on his own, informed the Japanese that German recognition of Manchukuo would soon happen, a claim that strained German relations with both the Chinese, who were offended at the idea of German recognition for Manchukuo, and the Japanese, who were offended when German recognition did not come. The dispute was finally settled in February 1935 when Heye was finally disavowed by Hitler. Dirksen, a keen supporter of the "National Revolution" in Germany, often urged a German-Japanese rapprochement under the grounds that the Japanese plans for a "New Order in Asia" parallelled Germany's plans for a "New Order in Europe". In one dispatch to Berlin, Dirksen wrote: "It seems to be a psychological imperative and one dictated by reasons of state that these two great powers, who are combating the status quo and promoting the dynamism of living forces, should reach an agreement"" In 1936, Dirksen joined the Nazi Party and then always wore a party badge.

In 1935, Dirksen wrote up a private manuscript Zwischenbilanz (Intermediate Balance Sheet) recounting his life until then, which the American historian Robert Wistrich wrote showed him up to be "an egocentric, ambitious and embittered man" who complained that Hitler failed to appreciate sufficiently his loyal service. Dirksen was "outspokenly anti-Semitic", boosted that he never had any Jewish friends or joined any social clubs that admitted Jews, and said that liked the company of only Aryans. In April 1936, Dirksen finally made it to Changchun and concluded a Manchukuo–German trade agreement, which did not constitute de jure German recognition of Manchukuo, which the Reich continued to proclaim to remain part of China, but it was a de facto recognition of Manchukuo. In May 1936, Dirksen complained that the visit to China of General Walther von Reichenau, a well-known German general on the active list and known as one of Hitler's favorite generals, would offend Japan. At the same time, Dirksen emerged as one of the proponents of signing the Anti-Comintern Pact with Japan, which caused tensions with the Wehrmacht, which opposed the pact, and Neurath, not the least because plans for the pact had originated with Neurath's enemy, Joachim von Ribbentrop.

In his dispatches to Berlin, Dirksen consistently advocated Germany choosing Japan over China. In one dispatch, Dirksen argued the Kuomintang were too corrupt and disorganized to ever defeat the Chinese Communists, making it inevitable the latter would win the Chinese civil war. In a conscious echo of the Wilhelmine fear of the "Yellow Peril", Dirksen argued that it happened, a Communist China would ally itself with the Soviet Union, and the two would invade Europe. Happily for the Reich, Dirksen argued there was a strong power in the form of Japan that had a "civilizing mission" in China, being willing and able to impose "order" on the hopelessly backward Chinese and stop Communism in Asia, which led him to the conclusion that Germany's Asian ally should be Japan rather than China. After the Xi'an Incident of December 1936, which led to the formation of the "united front" of the Chinese Communist Party and the Kuomintang to resist any further Japanese encroachments on China, Dirksen reported to Berlin that Japan would never stand for this, and predicted that the Japanese would strike China sometime in 1937.

In July 1937, the Second Sino-Japanese War began with the Marco Polo Bridge Incident. Dirksen reported that his Japanese hosts were extremely unhappy that Germany was the largest supplier of arms to China and that officers of the German military mission were training and, in some cases, leading the troops of the Chinese National Revolutionary Army to battle against the Imperial Japanese Army. In response to Dirksen's suggestion for the German military mission to be recalled from China, War Minister Field Marshal Werner von Blomberg proposed sending more officers to the military mission in China. In late 1937, Dirksen become involved in attempts to mediate the end of the Sino-Japanese war. The war had caused a major bureaucratic power struggle within the German government: the Wehrmacht and the Auswärtiges Amt supported China, but the Dienststelle Ribbentrop, the SS and the Propaganda Ministry supported Japan. Dirksen, a pro-Japanese voice in the otherwise pro-Chinese Auswärtiges Amt, feared that his career might become marginalized, as Neurath was annoyed at Dirksen's support for the pro-Japanese Ribbentrop, which led Dirksen to suggest German mediation to end the war before the struggle between the pro-Japanese and pro-Chinese factions destroyed his career. Neurath feared that he might lose out in the power struggle with Ribbentrop and took up the suggestion of mediation as a way out. Hitler was indecisive about which side to back.

On 3 November 1937, Japanese Foreign Minister Kōki Hirota gave Dirksen a set of peace terms, which Dirksen sent to Neurath, who in his turn passed them along to Oskar Trautmann, the German ambassador in China, to be handed over to the Chinese. On 7 December 1937, Dirksen met with Hirota to report that Chiang Kai-shek was willing to make peace with Japan if China did not lose any more territory but was otherwise open to "peace talks on the basis of Japanese peace conditions". That posed a problem as ever since the war had begun in July 1937, Japan never stated any war aims other than to "chastise" the Chinese in the "holy war" waged for the sake of the god-emperor of Japan. The Japanese cabinet met to begin discussions of the peace terms that would be sought, but on 13 December 1937, the Japanese Army took the Chinese capital of Nanjing, which caused a euphoric mood in Tokyo. Japanese Prime Minister Prince Fumimaro Konoe decided, over the objections of the military, to escalate the war by seeking a "total victory" by making peace terms that he knew that Chiang could never accept. On 21 December 1937, Dirksen was presented with the Japanese peace terms to be presented to the Chinese, which were so extreme that even Dirksen remarked that they seemed to be written only to inspire their rejection by the Chinese. Dirksen took a very pro-Japanese and anti-Chinese line on the question of mediation and said that if Germany had to choose Japan over China if necessary. In a dispatch to the Wilhelmstrasse sent on 16 January 1938, Dirsken advised recalling the German military mission from China, ending arms sales to China, recognizing Manchukuo, prohiniting German investment in Kuomintang China and allowing German corporations to invest only in Japanese-occupied northern China. Noting that Ribbentrop was very pro-Japanese and anti-Chinese, Weinberg described Dirksen as the "one important member of the German diplomatic corps who agreed with Ribbentrop's China policy" who did much to ensure the final German recognition of Manchukuo in 1938.

== Ambassador to the Court of St. James's ==
In early 1938, as part of the Blomberg-Fritsch affair that saw Hitler tighten his control of the foreign policy-military apparatus, Neurath was fired as Foreign Minister, and Ribbentrop, the ambassador in London, was appointed the new foreign minister. Besides forcing the War Minister, Field Marshal Werner von Blomberg to retire and firing the Army's commander General Werner von Fritsch, several senior generals and diplomats were also fired, which Dirksen took advantage of by asking for a new post. Dirksen was rewarded by being made the German ambassador in London to replace Ribbentrop. The fact that Dirksen had supported Ribbentrop's pro-Japanese line against Neurath had endeared him to Ribbentrop, and furthermore, Dirksen had managed to get along well with Dr. Heinrich Georg Stahmer, the chief of the Asian desk of the Dienststelle Ribbentrop, which was an additional plus for him. Moreover, Ribbentrop, wanted to promote General Eugen Ott, the German military attache to Japan, to be the ambassador in order to force the Japanese to reciprocate, and thereby promote his very good friend General Ōshima Hiroshi, the Japanese military attache to Germany, to be Japanese ambassador in Berlin. General Oshima was unique as being the only diplomat who actually liked Ribbentrop.

On 4 February 1938, the same day that Hitler fired Neurath, also saw the firing of Count Ulrich von Hassell as German ambassador to Italy, and for a time, it was widely believed that Dirksen would be sent to Rome to replace Hassell. Hitler's original plan was to move Franz von Papen, the German ambassador to Austria, to Spain while Baron Eberhard von Stohrer, the German ambassador to Spain, was to go to London to replace Ribbentrop. As it was, the crisis that led to the Anschluss broke before Papen could go to Burgos (the capital of Nationalist Spain), requiring him to stay in Vienna, and Hitler decided to keep Stohrer, who had proven he could get along well with the prickly General Franco, in Burgos. Count Hans Georg von Mackensen was demoted from State Secretary and appointed the German ambassador in Rome to replace Hassell as he was Neurath's son-in-law, which made him staying on as State Secretary unacceptable to Ribbentrop. The German Embassy to the Court of St. James was one of the traditional "grand embassies" operated by the Auswärtiges Amt and to be appointed German ambassador to the United Kingdom was a major promotion for Dirksen, who now had one of the most prestigious ambassadorships that there was to be had in the Auswärtiges Amt. Unlike Ribbentrop who was an amateur diplomat who caused an endless number of gaffes during his time as ambassador to the court of St. James, Dirksen, who was a professional diplomat, and whose appointment was very much welcomed in London as the British regarded him as "a man of ability", unlike his predecessor.

In 1938–39, he was German Ambassador at the Court of St. James's, being appointed on 7 April 1938. Dirksen's relations with his superior, Foreign Minister Joachim von Ribbentrop, were very poor. Dirksen despised Ribbentrop as "an unwholesome, half-comical figure". Dirksen wrote his 1950 memoirs Moscow, Tokyo, London: "During my term of office in London, Hitler never once took the trouble of following up on British offers of negotiations, even if only as a pretense. He never even answered". On 24 April 1938, Konrad Henlein, the leader of the Sudeten Heimatfront, which was the largest party representing the ethnic Germans in the Czechoslovak parliament, had announced the Karlsbad programme at a party congress in Karlsbad, Czechoslovakia (modern Karlovy Vary, Czech Republic) demanding wide-ranging autonomy for the Sudetenland while also announcing he was still loyal to Czechoslovakia. The German government declared its support for the Karlsbad Programme (which had been secretly drafted in March at a meeting between Hitler and Heinlein), thus beginning the crisis in Central Europe that was to end with the Munich Agreement. The apparent moderation of Germany in only demanding autonomy for the Sudetenland masked a sinister purpose, namely to make it appear that Czechoslovakia was the intransigent one in refusing to grant autonomy for the Sudetenland, thus "forcing" Germany to invade. Heinlein had promised Hitler that "We must always demand so much that we can never be satisfied".

On 3 May 1938, Dirksen presented his accreditation to King George VI at Buckingham Palace and formally become the German ambassador to the court of St. James's. After arriving in London, Dirksen told Viscount Astor, that the speech of the British Prime Minister Neville Chamberlain given after the Anschluss had "closed the door" on further Anglo-German talks for a resolution of the problems of Europe. At his first meeting with the Foreign Secretary, Lord Halifax, the subject was the Sudetenland question with Dirksen assuring Halifax that his government was "very anxious to keep things quiet in Czechoslovakia". Dirksen reported that Halifax had promised him that London together with Paris were going to send a démarche to Prague urging the Czechoslovak President Edvard Beneš to make "concessions to the utmost limit" to the Sudeten Heimatfront, which had demanding autonomy. To show the British the apparent reasonableness of the Sudeten Heimatfront, Dirksen had Heinlein visit London starting on 12 May 1938 to meet various British politicians where he denied he was working for Hitler, talked much about the Czechs were "oppressing" the ethnic Germans of the Sudetenland by forcing ethnic German children to attend schools where they were taught in Czech, and insisted he only wanted autonomy for the Sudetenland, though he did admit that if Prague refused to give in to all of eight demands of the Karlsbad programme, then Germany would definitely invade Czechoslovakia. At a luncheon hosted by the National Labour MP Harold Nicolson, Heinlein met with various backbenchers from all parties, where he impressed them with his genial charm and mild-mannered ways. However, several of the MPs like the Conservative MP, General Edward Spears, expressed some concern about the parts of the Karlsbad Programme declaring that Prague should "harmonise" its foreign policy with Berlin's, and that to be German was to be a National Socialist and as such the Sudeten Heimatfront was to be the only legal party in the proposed autonomous Sudeten region.

Starting with the May Crisis in May 1938, Dirksen received warnings from the Foreign Office that Germany should not attempt to resolve the Sudetenland dispute via war. During the May crisis, Dirksen reported to Berlin that Britain did not want to go to war with Germany for the sake of Czechoslovakia, but probably would if Germany did indeed invade Czechoslovakia. Dirsken reported that Halifax had told him that "in the event of a European conflict it was impossible to foresee whether Britain would not be drawn into it". Dirksen interpreted Halifax's statement as meaning that Britain probably would go to war if Germany attacked Czechoslovakia, but noted that Halifax was unwilling to say this explicitly. At the same time, Dirksen was friendly with Joseph Kennedy senior, the U.S. ambassador to the court of St. James. Dirksen often reported to Berlin anti-Semitic remarks on the part of Kennedy, at one point stating that Kennedy had told him: "it was not so much the fact that we [i.e., Germany] wanted to get rid of the Jews that was so harmful to us, but rather the loud clamor with which we accomplished this purpose.”

On 8 June 1938, Dirksen was "frankly outspoken" on Ribbentrop in a meeting with Halifax, telling him that it was not true that Ribbentrop was an Anglophobe, and he understood that his failure as ambassador to Britain was because "he had always felt obliged to keep one eye so much on the German end...Nonetheless, he [Ribbentrop] still wished to establish closer relations between our two countries". Schorske wrote that everything that Dirksen told Halifax about Ribbentrop was a lie, as Ribbentrop had emerged as the loudest anti-British voice in the Reich government, who was convinced that sooner or later Germany and Britain were destined to go to war again. On the same day, Dirksen reported to Berlin about the "psychotic" British people who were willing to go to war with Germany, writing "the feeling...of being made a fool of in that affair [the Anschluss], grew up again, together with the determination not to allow unchallenged further alterations in the balance of power in Europe...The attitude of the British people to the possibility of war has changed entirely since 1936. They are ready to fight should their government show them that this is necessary in order to put an end to the subjectively experienced threats and uncertainty". Dirksen ended his dispatch with warning that Chamberlain was committed to peace, but the "psychotic" British people might push him into war, writing: "To regard the excitement of the last weeks as mere bluff might turn out to be a fatal error".

At the same time, Dirksen warned that the Chamberlain cabinet would "without the slightest doubt" go to war if Germany was seen to be threatening the balance of power in Europe, writing that British appeasement was based on "the one condition that Germany would endeavor to achieve these ends by peaceful means". Dirksen ended his dispatch of 8 June with the predication that the Chamberlain cabinet was willing to see the Sudetenland join Germany, provided it was done after a referendum and "not interrupted by forcible measures on the part of Germany". In July 1938, Dirksen told Albert Forster, the Gauleiter of Danzig, who was visiting London, of his belief that Britain wanted a peaceful resolution of the Czechoslovak crisis, but he believed that Britain would go to war if Germany attacked Czechoslovakia. On 11 July 1938, Dirksen met with Charles Corbin, the French ambassador to the court of St. James. Corbin reported to Paris that Dirksen had told him:"The British people...increasingly tend to envisage the destruction of an air war as the inevitable result of German aggression against Great Britain", which Dirksen saw as a positive development, telling Corbin that there as long as the British people believed that the Luftwaffe would destroy their cities there was less chance of British "aggression" against Germany. Dirksen further advised Corbin that for this reason, France should not count on the British if they decided to honor the 1924 French-Czechoslovak alliance which committed France to go to war with any nation that attacked Czechoslovakia. However, Corbin also reported that Dirksen had complained to him that "public opinion is currently against Germany".

Later in July 1938, Dirksen was caught in the internal feuds of the Third Reich. Dirksen welcomed the secret visit to London of Captain Fritz Wiedemann, Hitler's personal adjutant, who were there representing Hermann Göring who wanted to arrange a visit to London to seek a peaceful solution to the Sudetenland dispute. Göring detested Ribbentrop, and as chief of the Four Year Plan organization, felt on economic grounds that Germany was not ready for a general war in 1938, which led him to oppose Hitler's plans to invade Czechoslovakia in autumn 1938. Göring was attempting to undercut foreign policy of Hitler and Ribbentrop by sending Wiedemann to London, a policy manoeuvre that was ruined when Dirksen told Ribbentrop that Wiedemann was in London, which enraged the Foreign Minister, who insisted quite vehemently that foreign policy was the sole preserve of the Auswärtiges Amt, and led to Wiedemann being recalled. In early August 1938, Dirksen returned to Berlin to tell Hitler personally of his belief that Britain would go to war if Germany invaded Czechoslovakia, a message that the Führer was not interested in. Hitler generally ignored Dirksen in August–September 1938, but Dirksen was in contact with several Nazis such as Rudolf Hess and Fritz Bohle, expressing his concerns that Hitler might trigger a general war by going ahead with his plans to invade Czechoslovakia on 1 October 1938.

In September 1938, at the Nuremberg Party Congress, Dirksen met Hitler, where he told him of his fears of a general war, and of his belief that the British were prepared to pressure the Czechoslovak government into ceding the Sudetenland to Germany as the price for peace. Hitler was not interested at this point in either a peaceful resolution of the Sudetenland dispute or in Dirksen's views. During the Nuremberg Party Congress, Hitler in his keynote speech on 12 September 1938 laid claim to the Sudetenland, and announced if the Sudetenland was not allowed to join Germany by 1 October, he would invade Czechoslovakia, escalating the crisis and taking Europe to the brink of war. In the crisis of September 1938 that led to the Munich Agreement, Dirksen played only a small role, but as a diplomat with an elegant bearing and aristocratic manners whose fluent English and polite ways charmed many in Britain, Dirksen was the respectable face of Nazi Germany in Britain in 1938. As a professional diplomat and an aristocrat, Dirksen enjoyed a good rapport with the British elite, and his insistence that Hitler was only seeking to correct the "injustices" of Versailles and not dominate Europe impressed many of the British policy-makers he met. Unlike Ribbentrop, whose arrogance and ignorance led him to commit many social gaffes, the eminently "correct" Dirksen with his perfect gentlemanly manners made a favourable impression in London. Right after the Munich Agreement and the Anglo-German Declaration, both signed on 30 September 1938, Dirksen was told by Ribbentrop that the Anglo-German Declaration, which committed the two nations never to go to war again, meant nothing to Hitler. However, Hitler was notoriously against another war with Britain, and likely felt emboldened to continue pursuing German aims without foreign intervention. While the declaration was well-received among the German public, Chamberlain was received with a protest 15,000 strong in Trafalgar Square, three times the number welcoming him at Downing Street.

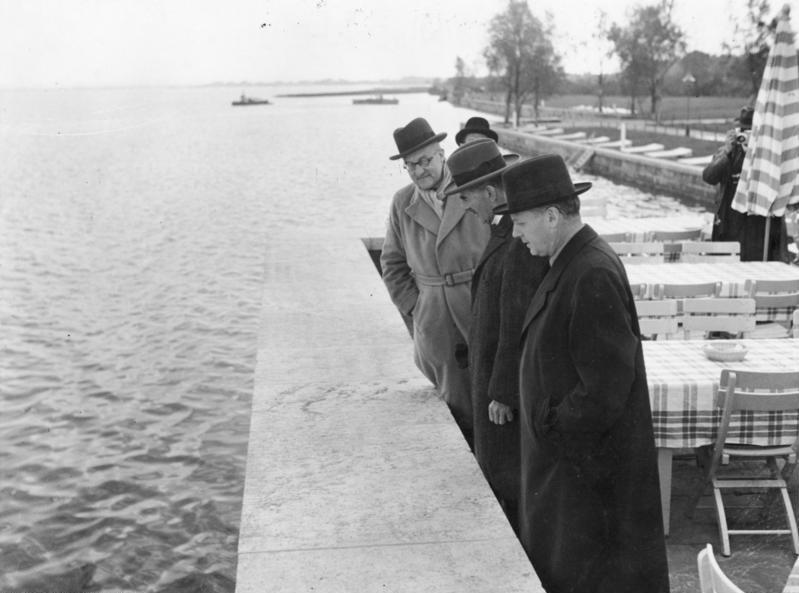
At the Chiemsee during the Bergsgarden summit, 15 September 1938. In the foreground from left to right Herbert von Dirksen, Neville Chamberlain and Joachim von Ribbentrop

In October 1938, in a dispatch to Berlin, Dirksen reported that British public reaction to Hitler's Saarbrücken speech on 3 October 1938, when Hitler stated that Germany would not tolerate British interference in the affairs of Europe was highly negative. Dirksen also advised Hitler to stop attacking by name two Conservative backbenchers in the House of Commons, namely Anthony Eden and Winston Churchill, saying his speeches gave more attention in the British press to Eden and Churchill - accusing the pair of warmongering and trying to pick a fight with Germany. Finally, Dirksen reported that based on his meetings with members of the British cabinet that he believed that the Chamberlain government was seeking an Anglo-German détente and advised that Germany take up the British offer of "disarmament" (in the 1930s the term "disarmament" referred to arms limitation), which he predicated would lead to Chamberlain offering to return to Germany the former African colonies now ruled by Britain. In response, Baron Ernst von Weizsäcker, the State Secretary of the Auswärtiges Amt, wrote back to Dirksen to say that campaign in the German media bashing British rearmament "was instigated on the direct orders of the Foreign Minister". Schorske noted that a "striking" aspect of the line of Anglo-German negotiations that Dirksen wanted to pursue in October 1938 was it reflected Chamberlain's priorities such as disarmament and the possible return of the former German colonies in Africa and did not reflect Hitler's priorities such as Czecho-Slovakia (as Czechoslovakia had been renamed in October 1938), the Memelland and Poland. In the last two weekends of October 1938, Dirksen made visits to the English countryside to meet Sir Samuel Hoare and Leslie Burgin for talks concerning an Anglo-German détente. Dirksen reported to the Wilhelmstrasse that both Hoare and Burgin wanted talks about an Anglo-German treaty that would end the arms race; another treaty that would "humanise" air war with bombing of cities and chemical weapons to be banned; a colonial settlement for returning the former German colonies in Africa in exchanges for promises of no war in Europe; and a British "guarantee" to protect Germany from the Soviet Union. The British historian D.C. Watt wrote: "This last is often cited by Soviet historians as proof of their thesis that the Cabinet was obsessed with the urge to provoke a German-Soviet war. Taken in its proper context, Hoare's ill-chosen remarks make it clear that the offer of a guarantee was intended to disarm any German arguments that Soviet strength in the air necessitated the maintenance of a large German Luftwaffe".

Three weeks after the Munich Agreement, which Dirksen had predicted would make possible an Anglo-German détente, Weizsäcker wrote to Dirksen: "Things here are moving rapidly, but not in the direction of Anglo-German rapprochement at present". In November 1938, Dirsken complained about the Kristallnacht pogrom solely under the grounds that it damaged Germany's image in Britain, making no moral condemnation of the pogrom at all. At the beginning of December 1938, Dirksen formally announced that his government planned to use the clauses in the Anglo-Naval Agreement to build a submarine fleet equal to Britain's, and would upgrade two cruisers under construction from the 6-inch guns they were meant to have to having 8-inch guns instead. In December 1938, Dirksen resumed his efforts for Anglo-German détente, hoping to negotiate a series of Anglo-German economic agreements as the starting point. In December 1938, Chamberlain gave a speech at a formal dinner of the correspondents of the German News Agency in London with Dirksen present. When Chamberlain spoke of the "futility of ambition, if ambition leads to the desire for domination", Dirksen, who interpreted that remark as an implied criticism of Hitler, led all of the assembled German journalists in walking out in protest.

In January 1939, Dirksen opened up talks with the Foreign Office for an Anglo-German coal agreement. Hitler had authorised the Anglo-German economic talks in January 1939 as a smokescreen for the anti-British turn in his foreign policy, approving the Z Plan on 27 January 1939 for a gigantic fleet that was meant to crush the Royal Navy by 1944. The Z Plan called for six H-class battleships with 20-inch guns that would have been the largest battleships ever built had they actually been constructed, dwarfing even the Yamato class battleships of Japan that were in fact the largest battleships ever built with their 18-inch guns. Building such truly colossal battleships took time and money, thus requiring a period of Anglo-German peace. A notable contradiction existed in Hitler's strategic planning in 1939 between embarking on an anti-British foreign policy, whose major instruments consisted of a vastly expanded Kriegsmarine and a Luftwaffe capable of a strategic bombing offensive that would take several years to build (e.g. Plan Z for expanding the Kriegsmarine was a five-year plan), and engaging in reckless short-term actions such as attacking Poland that were likely to cause a general war. Ribbentrop, for his part, because of his status as the Nazi British expert, resolved Hitler's dilemma by supporting the anti-British line and by repeatedly advising Hitler that Britain would not go to war for Poland in 1939.

In February 1939, Dirksen invited Oliver Stanley, the president of the Board of Trade, to visit Germany for economic talks in Berlin, which was taken as a sign in London that Germany wanted better relations. Dirksen also tried to have the Economics minister Walther Funk visit London for economics talks, but this was vetoed by Ribbentrop as a threat to his turf. Dirksen told the British Foreign Secretary Lord Halifax not to take personally the anti-British campaign in the German media that had been launched in November 1938, saying this was just a negotiating tactic and not preparation for war, going on to say that Ribbentrop was not really an Anglophobe and was willing to come to London to personally sign an Anglo-German nonaggression pact. In early March 1939, Dirksen visited Berlin, where Ribbentrop told him that Germany was going to violate the Munich Agreement later that month by occupying the Czech half of Czecho-Slovakia, saying that Prague would be German by the middle of the month. After his return to London on 9 March 1939, Dirksen recalled in his memoirs that he "found the same optimistic mood that had prevailed in February. Stanely's visit to Berlin was to take place soon – on March 17 – and it was obvious that the British government attached great importance to it".

Shortly afterward, Dirksen welcomed to London Gertrud Scholtz-Klink, the Frauenfuhrerin of the NSDAP's women branch, who come to Britain to study "social conditions" affecting British women. Scholtz-Klink was a fanatical Nazi who was praised by Hitler as "the ideal National Socialist woman". At the dinner to welcome Scholtz-Klink at the elite Claridge's restaurant hosted by the Anglo-German Fellowship was attended by an impressive collection of British high society women including Lady Violet Astor, the Dowager Marchioness of Reading, the Conservative MP Florence Horsbrugh, the Dowager Countess of Airlie, Lady Cynthia Colville, and the presidents of the National Women's Citizens Association, the National Council of Women of Great Britain, and the National Council for Maternity and Child Welfare. Dirksen reported that the dinner went well and the British women were very interested in what Scholtz-Klink had to say, though the fact that she spoke no English and needed an interpreter imposed problems. However, Scholtz-Klink's visit to London sparked protests by British feminists outside the German embassy with women carrying signs written in German reading "Freedom for the women of Hitler's concentration camps".

On 15 and 16 March 1939, during meetings with Lord Halifax, following the German occupation of the Czech half of Czecho-Slovakia, he received warnings that Britain would go to war to resist any Germany attempt to dominate the world, and Britain might attempt a policy of "containment" following this violation of the Munich Agreement. Dirksen's meetings with Lord Halifax were described as very "stormy" as Halifax chided him for the way his government had just violated the Munich Agreement. Dirksen in response stated that the Treaty of Versailles was "unjust" to the Reich, that Czechoslovakia had been created by Versailles, and therefore the destruction of Czecho-Slovakia was justified as Germany was just undoing the "unjust" terms of Versailles. Halifax was not impressed with this argument, telling Dirksen that his government had promised in the Munich Agreement to respect the sovereignty of Czecho-Slovakia and for him keeping a promise was the mark of men of honor. Halifax, an aristocrat from Yorkshire, had felt a certain affinity for Dirksen, an aristocrat from Silesia, for which reason he found dishonesty from Dirksen to be especially reprehensible, telling Dirksen that gentleman do not lie to one another. In his reports to Berlin, Dirksen toned down Halifax's language and remarks-especially the parts where Lord Halifax criticized Dirksen for not behaving like a gentleman and an aristocrat by lying to him-while the British transcripts showed that Halifax was a far more angrier man than what Dirksen's reports would suggest.

On 17 March 1939, Chamberlain delivered a speech in Birmingham to the Birmingham Unionist Association saying that if Germany wanted to dominate the world, then Britain would go to war rather than accept a world dominated by the Reich. In his speech, Chamberlain wondered aloud that if by occupying Prague Germany had taken "a step in the direction to dominate the world by force?", going on to say if Germany wanted to "challenge" Britain for world domination that "no greater mistake could be made than to suppose that because it believes war to be a senseless and cruel thing, this nation has so lost its fiber that it will not take part to the utmost of its power in resisting such a challenge if it ever were made". In a long report about the Birmingham speech sent to Berlin on 18 March 1939, Dirksen wrote: "It would be wrong to cherish any illusions that a fundamental change has not taken place in Britain's attitude to Germany".

Dirksen took a contradictory line in the spring and summer of 1939, torn as he was between his desire to see a war that would wipe Poland off the map vs. his fear of starting a world war that Germany might lose. Dirksen was extremely anti-Polish and had often called for the destruction of Poland, so he was supportive of Fall Weiss (Case White), the German plan for an invasion of Poland. Schorske wrote that Dirksen "believed firmly in the justice of Hitler's anti-Polish policy. Like most German nationalists, he held the Poles in complete contempt, a contempt fortified in his case by service in Warsaw and Danzig during his younger years". When Britain offered the "guarantee" of Poland on 31 March 1939, Dirksen protested to Lord Halifax that: "Britain, by her guarantee to Poland, placed the peace of the world in the hands of minor Polish officials and military men".

Dirksen's policy in the Danzig crisis was one to attempting to sever Britain from Poland so Germany could attack the latter without fear of war with the former. Dirksen was all for a war with Poland in 1939, but less so for a war with Britain, hence his repeated efforts to sever Britain from Poland by trying to persuade the British to give up the "guarantee" of Poland. In his meetings with Lord Halifax in the spring of and summer of 1939, Dirksen often told him about "Polish adventurism and moral turpitude", attacking the British quite violently for being so "foolish" as to make a "guarantee" of a people whom Dirksen insisted were completely undeserving of British protection. Dirksen reported to Weizsäcker that he wanted "to enlighten the English, who are unsophisticated in continental and especially East European affairs, on the nature of the Polish state, and on our claims to Danzig and the Corridor". About the British efforts to create a "peace front" to "contain" Germany, Dirksen told Halifax that the entire German people were "unanimously determined to parry this danger of encirclement and not to tolerate a repetition of 1914". Despite Dirksen's attempts to argue that the Free City of Danzig, which was 90% German, should be allowed to return to the Reich, the German occupation of the Czech half of Czecho-Slovakia on 15 March 1939 meant the British were not receptive to his appeals in 1939 as they had been in 1938 with the Sudetenland. As Lord Halifax put it on 20 July 1939:

“Last year the German government put forward the demand for the Sudetenland on purely racial grounds; but subsequent events proved that this demand was only put forward as a cover for the annihilation of Czechoslovakia. In view of this experience… it is not surprising that the Poles and we ourselves are afraid that the demand for Danzig is only a first move towards the destruction of Poland’s independence”

Starting on 14 April 1939, and continuing right up to 16 August 1939, the German Embassy in London received on a weekly basis anonymously mailed packages containing decrypted diplomatic cables from the Foreign Office to the British Embassy in Moscow and back that were carefully edited to make it appear that Anglo-Soviet relations were far better than what there were, and that the talks to have the Soviet Union join the "peace front" were going well. Dirksen was not entirely certain where the packages were coming from or the precise veracity of their contents, but he passed them on along back to Berlin, saying this intelligence might be useful. Two cipher clerks in the Foreign Office, John King and Ernest Oldham, had independently of each both sold in the early 1930s the Foreign Office's codes to the NKVD, the Soviet secret police, and as a result, the Soviets were reading all of the Foreign Office's cables all through the 1930s. The mysterious packages were from the NKVD who wanted to make it appear that an Anglo-Soviet alliance was in the offering as a way of frightening Germany to come to terms with Moscow.

On 18 May 1939, during a meeting with Lord Halifax, Dirksen was informed that the Reich should have no illusions about Britain's willingness to go to war, and if Germany should attack Poland, then Britain would go to war. In response, an angry Dirsken told Halifax that Germany's policy had always been and still was to peacefully seek to revise the Treaty of Versailles, that Germany had no intention of invading Poland, and Halifax had fallen victim to anti-German hysteria in believing otherwise. Dirksen often reported to Berlin that the British efforts to build a "peace front" were floundering over the question of including the Soviet Union. On 27 May 1939, Chamberlain told the House of Commons that the cabinet had instructed Sir William Seeds, the British ambassador in Moscow, to open discussions about a military alliance. Dirken reported to the Wilhelmstrasse that Chamberlain had opened the talks with the Soviets "with the greatest reluctance", and that he was not keen on an alliance with the Soviet Union. Dirksen further reported that the British had learned about the "German feelers in Moscow" and were "afraid that Germany might succeed in keeping Soviet Russia neutral or even inducing her to adopt benevolent neutrality. That would have meant the complete collapse of the encirclement action".

On 24 June 1939, Dirksen in a dispatch to Berlin reported his efforts to turn the British against the "guarantee" of Poland were bearing fruit and stated that he believed the British government was moving away from the "encirclement" of Germany towards a "more constructive policy" towards the Reich. Dirksen reported on the same day that British public opinion had been caught up in anti-German "hysteria" in the spring, but he now believed that public opinion was in a "state of flux" as the full implications of war with Germany were starting to sink in. As evidence, Dirksen quoted to Weizsäcker from several letters to the editor of The Times attacking the Poles for refusing to allow Danzig to rejoin Germany and criticizing Chamberlain for the "guarantee" of Poland, which for Dirksen was proof that British public opinion was changing. Dirksen also wrote that "a surprise initiative on the part of Chamberlain is within the bounds of probability and it is quite possible that rumor current here, that he will approach Germany with new proposals after the completion of the negotiations with the Russians will materialize into fact in one form or another". In Dirksen's viewpoint, the proposed alliance with the Soviet Union that would form the eastern anchor of the "peace front" was merely a negotiating tactic for a Munich-type deal to resolve the Danzig crisis rather a means of deterring Germany from invading Poland.

In early July 1939, Dirksen reported to the Wilhelmstrasse that British public opinion would come to understand that the "justice" of the German demand that the Free City of Danzig be allowed to rejoin Germany. Dirksen wrote: "The wave of excitement will ebb as soon as it rose, as soon as the proper conditions exist. The most important condition is a quieter atmosphere in England which will permit a more unprejudiced examination of the German viewpoint. The germs of this already exist. Within the Cabinet and a small, but influential group of politicians, a desire is manifested to pass from the negativity of the encirclement front to a more constructive policy towards Germany. And however strong the counter-forces trying to stifle this tender plant may be-Chamberlain's personality is a certain guarantee that a British policy will not be placed in the hands of unscrupulous adventurers (i.e Churchill, Eden, etc)." About the British efforts to build a "peace front", Dirksen explained this to Berlin as a result of a "dual policy" of the part of the Chamberlain government. Dirksen reported: "England wants by means of armament and the acquisition of allies to make herself strong and equal to the Axis, but at the same time she wants by means of negotiation to seek an adjustment with Germany and is prepared to make sacrifices for it: on the question of colonies, raw materials supplies, Lebensraum, and spheres of economic influence". In private, Dirksen complained that the relentless Anglophobia of Ribbentrop was unnecessarily inflaming Anglo-German relations as Ribbentrop persisted in presenting to Hitler every move in British foreign policy in the worse possible light, and he told the Foreign Office in an "off-the-record" meeting that a high-level Englishman who was fluent in German (Hitler only spoke German) should visit Berlin to meet Hitler to tell him that an Anglo-German rapprochement was still possible.

On 17 July 1939, Helmuth Wohlthat, Hermann Göring's deputy in the Four Year Plan organization, attended the meeting of the International Whaling Conference in London as part of the German delegation, and the next day, he and Dirksen met Sir Horace Wilson, the Chief Industrial Adviser to the Government and one of Chamberlain's closest friends. Wilson decided to talk to Wohlthat of the Four Year Plan Organisation rather than the Auswärtiges Amt run by the Anglophobic Ribbentrop. Without informing Ribbentrop, Dirksen allowed the Wilson-Wohlthat meetings in London to go ahead, where Wilson offered in an exchange for a German promise not to attack Poland and a "renunciation of aggression in principle" as a way of solving international disputes, an Anglo-German nonaggression pact, a "delimitation of spheres of influence" in Europe and a plan for the "international governance" of Africa where all of the great powers of Europe would jointly administer Africa. However, Wilson did make clear to Wohlthat that he regarded Germany as the source of the tension between Germany and Poland by laying claim to Danzig, and he made it clear that the onus was on the Reich to reduce tension with Poland, not the other way around; Lord Halifax told Dirksen much the same thing at the same time. Dirksen and Wohlthat argued that Wilson and another British civil servant Robert Hudson had given them a memo entitled "Programme for German-British Cooperation", but Wilson denied having given them such a document, and in his account of the meeting to the Foreign Office suggested that neither Wohlthat nor Dirksen seemed very serious as both expected all of the concessions to come from the British side with Germany making none.

On 20 July 1939, Robert Hudson of the Department of Overseas Trade, visited the German embassy to meet Dirksen and Wohlthat. Hudson, a junior minister who was addicted to intrigue, was acting on his own, hoping to score a great success that would help his otherwise stalled career. In a somewhat vainglorious account of his meeting at the German embassy, Hudson spoke of about having Danzig rejoin Germany with Germany promising to leave Poland alone. According to Hudson's notes, in exchange for a German promise not to invade Poland and ending the Anglo-German arms race, there would be a plan for the industrialists running the heavy industry of Germany, Britain and the United States to work together in the economic development of China, Eastern Europe and Africa; of a loan in sum of hundreds of millions for Germany to be floated in the City and on Wall Street; and some sort of plan for the "international governance" of Africa, and he ended his account by saying that if only Hitler would just learn to think in economic terms, much was possible. A preening Hudson-who believed that he had more or less single-handedly saved the world from the threat of another world war with his visit to the German Embassy-unwisely showed his notes recording what he had said to a group of journalists, telling them "off-the-record" it was he who just ended the Danzig crisis with his bold proposals for Anglo-German economic co-operation as Wohlthat was definitely interested in what he had to say. Hudson asked the journalists not to publish yet, saying his plan needed more time, but two of the journalists decided that the story was news and decided to publish. On 22 July 1939, The Daily Telegraph and the News Chronicle both broke the story on their front-pages that Britain just had offered Germany a loan worth hundreds of millions of pound sterling in exchange for not attacking Poland. The public reaction to this story was highly negative with much of the press calling Hudson's proposed loan "Danegeld". In order to stop Viking raids and attacks, the English kings had sometimes paid "Danegeld" ("Dane money") to bribe the Danes from attacking-ever since that time, the term "paying the Danegeld" in England implies weakness and cowardice, that someone would rather bribe their way out of trouble rather than stand up for oneself. By calling Hudson's proposed loan to Germany "Danegeld", the British newspapers were in effect saying Hudson was a coward. Much to Hudson's humiliation, Chamberlain told the House of Commons that no such loan was being considered and that Hudson was speaking for himself.

Based on his meetings with Wilson, Dirksen advised on 24 July 1939 taking up Wilson's offer to discuss how best to peacefully return Danzig to Germany, saying the Reich had to make a move soon if "Churchill and the other incendiaries" in the backbenches were to be stopped from toppling the Chamberlain government. Dirksen approved of the Wilson-Wohltat meetings as he felt it was possible to reach an Anglo-German deal with Göring, a much more pragmatic Nazi than Ribbentrop. Dirksen found his room to maneuver had been greatly reduced by the Hudson affair hitting the press, and found it difficult to contact Wohlthat after he returned to Germany on 21 July 1939. It was not until late August that Dirksen finally saw the report that Wohlthat had given Göring his return to Berlin in late July. Dirksen had supported the Wilson-Wohlthat meetings, but had managed to hide his role enough as to make it appear he was only a minor player, in order to protect himself from Ribbentrop, as he knew he would disapprove. On 31 July 1939, Ribbentrop in a message to Dirksen attacked him severely for allowing the Wilson-Wohlthat talks to even take place, saying the British had no business in talking to one of Göring's men, and demanded that the British conduct any negotiations only with him. Dirksen only managed to save himself from worse trouble by presenting Wilson as the man who initiated the talks, which he portrayed to Ribbentrop as a sign of British weakness. Ribbentrop had no interest in any sort of talks to resolve the German-Polish dispute as he wanted a war in 1939 with the Danzig dispute being a mere pretext. Count Hans-Adolf von Moltke, the German ambassador to Poland, had been ordered by Ribbentrop not to conduct talks with the Poles as it always Ribbentrop's great fear in 1939 that the Poles might actually agree to the Free City of Danzig rejoining Germany, and for the same reason Ribbentrop always refused to see Józef Lipski, the Polish ambassador to Germany.

Only nine hours after Ribbentrop had attacked Dirksen for allowing the Wilson-Wohlthat talks to occur and ordered him to sabotage the talks, Weizsäcker sent Dirksen a cable asking him if the British were prepared to sever their commitments to Poland and how serious were the British about having the Soviet Union join the "peace front". Dirksen in response sent Weizsäcker a cable stating "leading personages" in London were willing to abandon Poland if Germany promised not to take Danzig by force, and the entire strategy of the "peace front" would be disregarded if Germany was willing to take up the offers made by Wilson to Wohlthat. As for the Soviet Union joining the "peace front", Dirksen reported:

"The continuation of negotiations for a pact with Russia, in spite of – or rather, just because of – the dispatch of a military mission is regarded here with skepticism. This is borne out by the composition of the British military mission: the admiral, until now the Commandant of Portsmouth, is practically in retirement, and was never on the staff of the Admiralty; the general is likewise purely a combat officer; the air general is an outstanding aviator and air instructor, but not a strategist. This indicates the value of the military mission is more to ascertain the fighting value of the Soviet Army rather than to make operational arrangements...The Wehrmacht attachés are agreed in observing a surprising skepticism in British military circles about the forthcoming talks with the Soviet armed forces."

Dirksen also noted the British military mission to the Soviet Union headed by Admiral Sir Reginald Aylmer Ranfurly Plunkett-Ernle-Erle-Drax was taking a ship, the City of Exeter not noted for its speed to take them to Soviet Russia, which he used to argue that British were not really serious about having the Soviet Union join the "peace front". Dirksen believed this report would win Hitler to a plan to "chemically dissolve the Danzig problem" (i.e. not seek war), but instead Ribbentrop used Dirksen's report to argue to Hitler that the British were cowards unwilling to go war for Poland, as proven by Dirksen's statement that the British were not really interested in having the Soviet Union join the "peace front".

On 3 August 1939, Dirksen had his final meeting with Wilson. The accounts left by Dirksen and Wilson of this meeting are so different that they are impossible to reconcile. Wilson's account has him insisting it was Germany that had to take the initiative to end the Danzig crisis, and with him pressing Dirksen on why Hitler was not acting on this back-channel he opened to try to end the crisis. Dirksen, by contrast, portrayed Wilson as desperate for any sort of concession and reproduced Wilson's warnings of war as an expression of British fear of German might. The Canadian historian Michael Jabara Carley summarized the differences between the German and British accounts of the Wilson-Dirksen meeting as: "According to Wilson, Dirksen proposed an agenda of items that would interest Hitler, according to Dirksen, Wilson confirmed what he had suggested to Wohlthat, including a non-aggression pact and trade negotiations". Most notably, Dirksen has Wilson saying that the proposed Anglo-German non-aggression pact would both cancel out the "guarantee" to Poland and the negotiations with the Soviet Union, with the clear implication that Germany would have all of Eastern Europe in exchange for leaving the British empire alone. Dirksen also has Wilson saying that these negotiations must be kept secret as any leak would so anger the British people that it might bring down the Chamberlain government and he wanted the Anglo-German talks to be held in secret in Switzerland, a statement that does not appear in Wilson's notes of the meeting. Historians have greatly differed over which version of the Wilson-Dirksen meeting is the correct one. The American historian Zachery Shore argued that Dirksen had no reason to fabricate such an offer from Wilson, and Chamberlain was in fact seeking to begin secret negotiations for an Anglo-German nonaggression pact in Switzerland that would have seen Britain abandon Poland. By contrast, the British historian D.C. Watt has argued for the veracity of Wilson's notes, arguing that there is no evidence on the British seeking such a pact, and such a pact if signed would have probably brought down the Chamberlain government.

At times, Dirksen reported in his dispatches to Ribbentrop that British public opinion was tired of appeasement, and that Britain would go to war if Germany attacked Poland. However, Dirksen noted that the British "guarantee" of Poland issued on 31 March 1939 was only of Polish independence, not of the borders of Poland, and he believed based on contacts with British politicians that another Munich-type deal was possible under which the Free City of Danzig would rejoin Germany. At other times, Dirksen reported to Berlin that Britain would not honour the Anglo-Polish military alliance, and would back down if Germany invaded that nation. In August 1939 Dirksen reported that Chamberlain knew “the social structure of Britain, even the conception of the British Empire, would not survive the chaos of even a victorious war”, and so he would abandon the commitments to Poland. Dirksen's messages about Britain unwilling to go to war for the defense of Poland had the effect of convincing Hitler that any German attack on Poland would result only in a localized German–Polish war, not a world war.

To prevent any British offer that might stop the war, Ribbentrop ordered that none of his ambassadors in London, Paris, and Warsaw should be at their posts. On 14 August 1939, Dirksen arrived in Berlin to take a vacation in Germany, and was told by Weizsäcker that he was under no conditions to return to London. At the same time, Weizsäcker also informed Count Johannes von Welczeck, the German ambassador in Paris, and Count Hans-Adolf von Moltke, the German ambassador in Warsaw, who had also been ordered to take a vacation in Germany, that neither men were to return to their posts. Dirksen in his turn mentioned this to Baron Bernardo Attolico, the Italian ambassador in Berlin, saying it was going to be war for certain this summer, observing that if his country wanted a peaceful resolution of the Danzig crisis, then the ambassadors to Britain, France and Poland would be ordered to return to their embassies. Attolico reported this to Rome, and as the Germans had broken the Italian diplomatic codes, Dirksen was summoned to the Wilhelmstrasse by Ribbentrop to be screamed at and berated for his incompetence, and to be told he was now excluded from all political discussions as a security risk. When Germany invaded Poland on 1 September 1939, this was followed by a British declaration of war on Germany on 3 September, an effect of which was the ruin of Dirksen's diplomatic career, and he never held a major post again.

== World War II ==
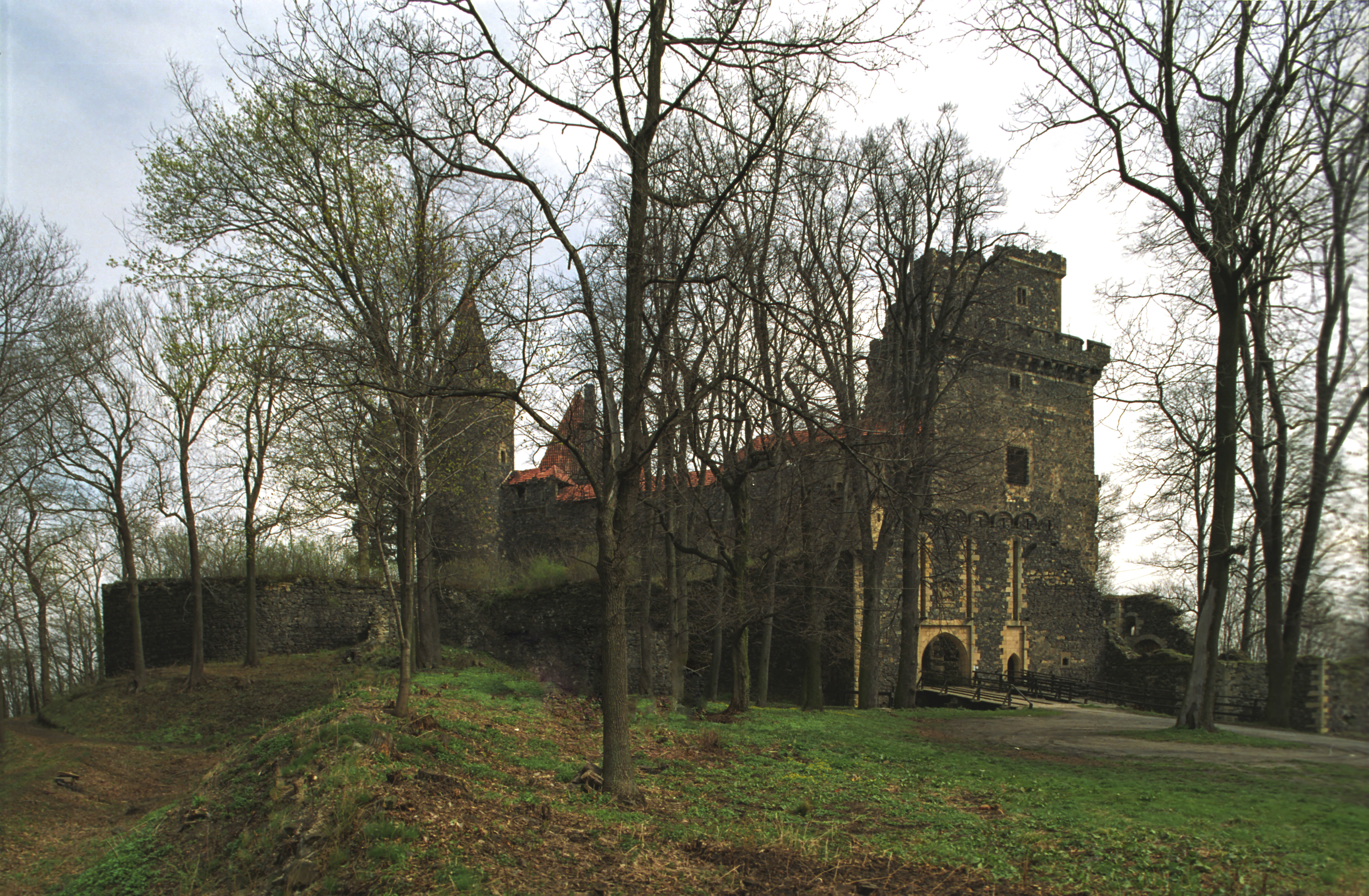
Gröditzberg

Dirksen spent most of the war at Gröditzberg and his estate in Silesia at Gröditz (now Grodziec, Poland). As a leading expert on the subject, Dirksen often gave talks on the Soviet Union at various locales throughout Europe, such as to Wehrmacht generals, most notably Field Marshal Erich von Manstein, who visited Gröditzberg to ask Dirksen for advice. As many of the farm labourers who worked Dirksen's estate were called up for service with the Wehrmacht, Dirksen used slave labour from Poland as replacement workers to tend to the sugar beet fields on his estate. In 1943, Dirksen published a picture book, Freundesland im Osten ein Nipponbuch in Bildern, containing a collection of photographs of daily Japanese life that he had taken during his time as ambassador in Japan.

In February 1945, Gröditzberg was taken by the Red Army. Dirksen chose to stay in the belief that he could serve as a mediator between the Soviet Union and Germany. The Red Army plundered the castle but became more respectful when Dirksen showed them a photograph taken in the early 1930s of himself and Defence Commissar Marshal Kliment Voroshilov. Voroshilov was unique under Stalin as being the only member of the Soviet Politburo allowed to have a personality cult of his own. Ribbentrop believed that Dirksen would betray secrets to the Soviets and ordered him to be taken back. An Abwehr team was infiltrated into Gröditzberg and arrived at the castle to tell Dirksen that he was coming, regardless of what he might think. On a cold February night, Dirksen and the Abwehr team walked through the frozen fields back to the German lines. Dirksen left behind his private papers at the castle, which were captured by the Red Army. In 1948, the Soviet Ministry of Foreign Affairs Affair published a very selective version of Dirksen's papers dealing with his time as ambassador in London to support the official Soviet historical line that British appeasement had been aimed at causing a German-Soviet war to save British capitalism, thus justifying the 1939 German-Soviet Pact to thwart the alleged British scheme.

== Later life ==
In 1947, Dirksen was cleared by a denazification court, which declared him not have been an active party member. In 1950, Dirksen published his memoirs, Moskau, Tokyo, London, recounting his career as a diplomat in the Soviet Union, Japan and the United Kingdom. He stated quite flatly that he was not ashamed that he had joined the Nazi Party in 1936, as the regime had achieved "impressive" political and economic changes in Germany.

In a review of the book, the American historian Fritz Epstein noted that there were significant differences between the book's German original, published in 1950, and the English version, published in 1952. One is that the section dealing with Dirksen's time as a diplomat in the Netherlands in 1917 had been reduced from three pages to six lines. Likewise his time as a diplomat in Kiev dealing with the puppet regime of Hetman Pavlo Skoropadskyi had six pages in the German original but three pages in the English edition.

In another review, the Canadian scholar Frank Tresnak asked about the differences between Germany's traditional elite and the Nazi elite. He answered, "If were we are to judge by this book, there seems to have been precious little". Tresnak continued, "From 1919 onward, the common aim of almost all Germans was to achieve the abolition of the Versailles diktat–a treaty which just or unjust, was an adequate expression of the German defeat of 1918, after a war which Germany herself started". Tresnak wrote that Dirksen's memoirs showed that he, in all essentials, fully agreed with Hitler's plans to destroy the international order that had been established by the Treaty of Versailles and to have Germany become the world's strongest power. They differed only on the precise strategy and tactics to be employed. Tresnak ended his review by remarking, "He has tears aplenty for torn and defeated Germany, but not a word of sympathy for the millions of murdered Jews, Poles, Yugoslavs, Czechs, and the rest.... After reading Herr von Dirksen's book, one cannot help feeling that he, and perhaps other Germans as well, condemn Hitler chiefly on the grounds that he did not win the war–though sometimes they act as they are not aware that he lost it".

In a review, the American political scientist Joseph Schectman noted that Dirksen expressed much anger in his memoirs about the expulsions of Germans from Eastern Europe but failed once to mention that Germany had killed about 1,500,000 Poles and 6,000,000 Jews during the war. Schectman noted Dirksen's seemed to say that only the lives of Germans matter, not the lives of Poles and Jews.

Baron Tilo von Wilmowsky, the husband of Barbara von Krupp and a senior executive at the firm of Krupp AG, which was Germany's biggest corporation, had become involved in a campaign to "clear the rubble" cast against German big business. Wilmowsky's preferred instrument was Henry Regnery, a conservative Germanophile American publisher based in Chicago that specialised in publishing books that sought to deny that Germany's traditional elites were anyway involved with Nazi crimes and portrayed Allied policies towards Germany both during and after World War II as cruel and unjust. It published such conservative classics as God and Man at Yale by William F. Buckley and The Conservative Mind by Russell Kirk as well as strongly-antiwar books such as Politics, Trials and Errors by Royal Marine General Maurice Hankey. They vigorously denounced the war crimes trials and argued for the innocence of all German and Japanese leaders convicted of war crimes. Also, it published Victor's Justice, by Montgomery Belgion, which condemned the Allied policies of bringing Nazi war criminals to justice as cruel and barbaric, and The High Cost of Vengeance, by Freda Utley, which argued that the Allied policies towards Germany had been criminal and inhumane.

In 1950, Wilmoswky used Dirksen, Heinrich Brüning, Franz von Papen and Belgion as his major advisers on the latest book that Regnery was going to publish, which was intended to deny that industrialists like him had supported the Nazi regime and used slave labour during World War II. The industrialist Baron Alfried Krupp von Bohlen und Halbach, who had effectively ran Krupp AG during World War II, had been convicted by an American court of using slave labour, and Wilmowsky wanted to rebut that charge. In a letter, Dirksen advised Wilmowsky that it would "psychologically better" if the book was presented as a "neutral investigation of industrialists in the total state and total war" that compared both industrial mobilization in the Allies and the Axis, rather than focusing on the actions of German industrialists. Dirksen argued that if the mobilization of industrialists by the state wartime were to be presented as a universal trend, the specific acts by German industrialists, like using slave labour, could be explained away as part of a universal tendency. Dirksen felt such a book would be useful in ending the "Nuremberg complex" held against Germany and argued that it was time that people stop holding Nazi crimes against Germany.

Belgion wrote to Dirksen: "My own feeling is that such a book... would not appeal to the general public unless it could be cast in the form of a dramatic story and that would require on the part of the author a rare combination of gifts—an understanding of the problems of large-scale business and also an ability to give the exposition of them a magic touch. I do not myself know of any English or American author who possesses that combination".

After much searching for an author, Wilmowsky's book was finally published by Regnery in 1954 as Tycoons and the Tyrant: German industry from Hitler to Adenauer by Louis P. Lochner, which portrayed German industrialists as victims of Hitler and argued it was not their fault that they ended up using slave labour in their factories.

Dirksen was active in the 1950s in groups that represented Germans expelled from Silesia and rejected the Oder–Neisse line as Germany's eastern frontier. In 1954, Dirksen called a press conference to criticize Chancellor Konrad Adenauer's policy of western integration. He instead argued that West Germany should try to play off the Western powers against the Soviet Union to achieve German reunification.

Dirksen passed away of pneumonia in Munich on 19 December 1955 at the age of 73.

== Works ==
- Die Geltendmachung bzw. Durchführung von Prozessen gegen einen rechtsfähigen Verein nach durchgeführter Liquidation [The Assertion and Conduct of Proceedings Against a Legally Competent Association After Completed Liquidation]. Berlin, 1905.
- Reisetagebuch, 1907 bis 1908 [Travel Diary: 1907 to 1908]. Berlin: Emil Streisand Verlag, 1909.
- Kritische Bemerkungen zu Marokko und Tripolis [Critical Remarks on Morocco and Tripoli], 1911.
- Kritische Bemerkungen zur Monroedoktrin [Critical Remarks on the Monroe Doctrine], 1912.
- Deutscher Imperialismus; Grundlagen des Imperialismus [German Imperialism; Foundations of Imperialism], 1913.
- Äußere Politik Englands vom deutschen Gesichtspunkt [England's Foreign Policy from the German Point of View], 1913.
- (Under the pseudonym Darius) Persönlichkeit in der Verwaltung: Kritische Bemerkungen zur Verwaltungsreform [Personality in Administration: Critical Remarks on the Administration Reform], 1914.
- (Under the pseudonym Darius) "Ziele des Krieges" [Goals of the War], Die Grenzboten (Berlin), iss. 6 (1915), pp. 161–170.
- (Under the pseudonym Darius) Wirkungen des Krieges: Phantasien eines Realisten [Results of the War: Phantasies of a Realist], 1915.
- (Under the pseudonym Darius) Sicherung des Deutschtums [Safeguarding Germandom], 1915.
- (Under the pseudonym Darius) Weltwirtschaft oder Autarkie [World Economy or Autarchy], 1915.
- (Under the pseudonym Darius) "Die Abschaffung der Diplomatie: Ein Zukunftstraum" [The Abolition of Diplomacy: A Future Dream], Neue Preußische Kreuzzeitung (Berlin), 468/469 (1916), p. 4.
- (Under the pseudonym Darius) "Die konservative Partei und die auswärtige Politik" [The Conservative Party and Foreign Policy], Die Post (Berlin; 1916).
- Deutschlands Politik nach dem Kriege [Germany's Politics After the War], 1917.
- Beiträge zur Weimarer Rede (über Außenpolitik) [Contributions to the Weimar Speech (on Foreign Policy)], 1919.
- Ein Sylvesterspuk [A New Year's Eve Spook], 1918/1919.
- Über konservative Politik [On Conservative Politics], 1919.
- Aufzeichnungen über die deutsch-litauischen Beziehungen [Notes on German-Lithuanian Relations], 1919.
- Der Zusammenhang zwischen auswärtiger Politik und Handelspolitik [The Connection Between Foreign Policy and Trade Policy], 1919.
- Bericht an das Auswärtige Amt über Reise mit der Interalliierten Kommission für das Baltikum nach Lettland und Litauen vom 16-27.12.1919 [Report to the Foreign Office on Journey with the Inter-Allied Commission for the Baltics to Latvia and Lithuania of 16–27 December 1919], 1919.
- Reisebriefe über Riga [Travel Reports About Riga], 1919.
- Erziehung zur Opposition (über Deutschnationale Volkspartei) [Education for Opposition (on the German National People's Party)], 1920.
- Reisebrief aus Warschau (Beginn der Gesandtschaft) [Travel Report on Warsaw (Beginning of the Legation)], 1920.
- Die deutschnationale Partei und das Dawes-Gutachten [The German National Party and the Dawes Plan], 1924.
- Deutschlands außenpolitische Möglichkeiten nach dem Krieg [Germany's Foreign Policy Options After the War], 1925.
- Die Rapallo-Linie [The Rapallo Line], 1925.
- Zwei Reisebriefe aus Moskau [Two Travel Reports on Moscow], 1925.
- Reisebrief über Lokarno [Travel Report on Locarno], 1925.
- Rücksversicherungsvertrag? [Reinsurance Treaty?], 1926.
- Die Genfer Völkerbundstagung vom 8.-27. Sept. 1926 [The Geneva League of Nations Meeting of 8–27 Sept. 1926], 1926.
- Über den "Beruf des Diplomaten" [On the "Profession of the Diplomat"], 1926.
- Handelspolitische Beziehungen zu Sowjetunion [Trade Policy Relations with the Soviet Union], 1927.
- Außenpolitische Bilanz [Foreign Policy Recollection], 1928.
- (Under the pseudonym Lynkeus) "Wohin steuert Rußland?" [Where is Russia Heading?], Der deutsche Volkswirt (Berlin), iss. 27 (1929), pp. 886–887.
- Über die Umgestaltung des wirtschaftlichen Denkens [On the Transformation of Economic Thinking], 1930.
- Rundschreiben über Japan [Circulars About Japan], 1934.
- Zwischenbilanz [Interim Recollection]. Tokyo, 1935.
- Die russische Entwicklung in ihrer Beziehung zum Antikominternpakt [Russian Development in Her Relation to the Anti-Comintern Pact], 1937.
- "Warum mußte es zur Auflösung Polens kommen?" [Why Must It Have Come to the Dissolution of Poland?], Wissen und Wehr (Berlin), iss. 7 (1940), pp. 272–281.
- "Allgemeine Bemerkungen über die Wechselwirkung zwischen Außenpolitik und Strategie in Japan" [General Remarks About the Interaction of Foreign Policy and Strategy in Japan], Wehrpolitischer Spiegel (Berlin), iss. 3 (1941), pp. 3–32.
- Die Wechselwirkung zwischen Aussenpolitik und Strategie in Japan von 1931-1941 [The Correlation Between Foreign Policy and Strategy in Japan from 1931–1941], 1942.
- "Die Unvermeidbarkeit des deutsch-sowjetischen Krieges vom wehrpolitischen und strategischen Gesichtspunkt aus" [The Inevitability of the German-Soviet War from a Military-Political and Strategic Point of View], Wissen und Wehr (Berlin), iss. 6 (1943), pp. 196–209.
- Japans Sendung in Ostasien [Japan's Mission in East Asia]. Berlin: Hermann Reinshagen Verlag, 1943.
- "Rußlands Drang nach Süden" [Russia's Drive to the South], Marine Rundschau (Berlin), no. 2 (1944), pp. 129–143.
- "Japan-USA in Krieg und Frieden. Ein staats- und wehrpolitischer Rück- und Ausblick" [Japan–USA in War and Peace: A Retrospective and Prospective on State and Defensive Policy], 1944.
- "Das Empire im Umbau / Eine weltpolitische Bestandsaufnahme" [The Empire in Restructuring / A Global Political Assessment], Badener Tagblatt, iss. 102 (1948), p. 2.
- "Der zweite Weltkrieg in englischer Beleuchtung" [The Second World War in English Illumination], Schweizer Monatshefte (Zürich), iss. 2 (1949), pp. 105–108.
- "Der geistige Kampf gegen den Bolschewismus" [The Intellectual Struggle Against Bolshevism], Schweizer Monatshefte (Zürich), iss. 10 (1949), pp. 609–614.
- Moskau, Tokio, London: Erinnerungen und Betrachtungen zu 20 Jahren deutscher Außenpolitik, 1919–1939 [Moscow, Tokyo, London: Memories and Reflections on 20 Years of German Foreign Policy]. Stuttgart: W. Kohlhammer Verlag, 1949.
  - Moscow, Tokyo, London: Twenty Years of German Foreign Policy. London: Hutchinson & Co, 1951.
  - Moscow, Tokyo, London: Twenty Years of German Foreign Policy. Norman, OK.: University of Oklahoma Press, 1952.
  - モスクワ・東京・ロンドン. Transl. by Shinsaku Hōgen and Susumu Nakagawa. Tokyo: Yomiuri Shimbun, 1953.
  - Москва, Токио, Лондон: Двадцать лет германской внешней политики. Transl. by N. Yu. Likhacheva. Moscow: Olma Press, 2001.
- "Diplomatie: Wiesen, Rolle und Wandlung" [Diplomacy: Backgrounds, Role and Transformation], Rechts- und sozialwissenschaftliche Vorträge und Schriften (Nuremberg), no. 3 (1950).
- "Die Opposition in der Sowjetunion" [The Opposition in the Soviet Union], Schweizer Monatshefte (Zürich), iss. 3 (1950), pp. 141–149.
- "Rotchinas Beziehungen zur Sowjetunion" [Red China's Relations with the Soviet Union], Schweizer Monatshefte (Zürich), iss. 7 (1950), pp. 401–404.
- "National-Kommunismus und Weltpolitik" [National Communism and World Politics], Schweizer Monatshefte (Zürich), iss. 10 (1950), pp. 577–582.
- "Es gärt in der Sowjetunion" [Things are Brewing in the Soviet Union], Gesammelte Aufsätze (1951).
- "Die neueste Sowjetbourgeoisie" [The Newest Soviet Bourgeoisie], Schweizer Monatshefte (Zürich), iss. 8 (1951), pp. 449–457.
- "Der Weg Russlands von der Revolution zur Reaktion" [The Way of Russia from Revolution to Reaction], Schweizer Monatshefte (Zürich), iss. 1 (1952), pp. 417–433.
- "Eduard von der Heydt zum 70. Geburtstag" [Eduard von der Heydt on his 70th Birthday], Neue Zürcher Zeitung (Zürich), morning iss. 2089, pp. 1–2.
- "Die politische Bedeutung der neuen Terrorwelle in der Sowjetunion" [The Political Meaning of the New Wave of Terror in the Soviet Union], Schweizer Monatshefte (Zürich), iss. 12 (1953), pp. 765–772.
- "Die Auswirkungen der mitteldeutschen Erhebung vom 16. und 17. Juni" [The Consequences of the Central German Uprising of 16 and 17 June], Schweizer Monatshefte (Zürich), iss. 5 (1953), pp. 257–261.
- "Die dritte Phase der russischen Revolution" [The Third Phase of the Russian Revolution], Schweizer Monatshefte (Zürich), iss. 1 (1954), pp. 80–87.
- "China nach der Genfer Konferenz" [China After the Geneva Conference], Schweizer Monatshefte (Zürich), iss. 1 (1954), pp. 355–360.
- "Die Sowjetunion in Gärung: Eine politische Buchbesprechung" [The Soviet Union in Turmoil: A Political Book Review], Schweizer Monatshefte (Zürich), iss. 1 (1954), pp. 804–810.

== Sources ==
- Dirksen, Herbert von, Moscow, Tokyo, London: Twenty Years of German Foreign Policy, Norman, OK: University of Oklahoma Press, 1952.
- Epstein, Fritz (April 1953). "Review of Moscow, Tokyo, London". The American Historical Review. 58 (3): 621–622.
- Snyder, Louis (1976). Encyclopedia of the Third Reich. New York: McGraw-Hill.
- Schorske, Carl (1953). "Two German Ambassadors: Dirksen and Schulenburg". In Gordon A. Craig and Felix Gilbert (ed.). The Diplomats 1919–1939. -Princeton, New Jersey: Princeton University Press. pp. 477–511.
- Mund, Gerald, Herbert von Dirksen (1882–1955). Ein deutscher Diplomat in Kaiserreich, Weimarer Republik und Drittem Reich. Eine Biografie. Berlin: dissertation.de – Verlag im Internet, 2003.
- Mund, Gerald: Ostasien im Spiegel der deutschen Diplomatie. Die privatdienstliche Korrespondenz des Diplomaten Herbert von Dirksen von 1933 bis 1938. Steiner Verlag, Stuttgart, 2006 (= Historische Mitteilungen der Ranke-Gesellschaft, Beiheft 63).
- Tresnak, Frank (Summer 1952). "Review of Moscow, Tokyo, London". International Journal. 7 (3): 229–231.
- Watt, Donald Cameron (1989). How War Came: The Immediate Origins of the Second World War, 1938-1939. London: Parthenon.
- Weinberg, Gerhard L. (1970). The Foreign Policy of Hitler's Germany: Diplomatic Revolution in Europe, 1933-1936. University of Chicago Press. ISBN 978-0-226-88509-4.
- Weinberg, Gerhard L. (1980). The Foreign Policy of Hitler's Germany: Starting World War Two 1937-1939. University of Chicago Press.
- Wistrich, Robert (2013). Who's Who In Nazi Germany. London: Routledge.

Diplomatic posts
Preceded by Ulrich Graf von Brockdorff-Rantzau	German Ambassador to the Soviet Union; 1928–1933	Succeeded by Rudolf Nadolny
Preceded by Willy Noebel	German Ambassador to Japan; 1933–1938	Succeeded by Eugen Ott
Preceded by Joachim von Ribbentrop	German Ambassador to the Court of St. James's; 1938–1939	Succeeded by position was terminated on 3 Sept 1939, following declaration of war
