= Here We Go Again Tour =

2018–20 concert tour by Cher

- World tour by Cher
- Promotional poster for the tour
- Location: Europe; North America; Oceania
- Associated album: Dancing Queen
- Start date: September 21, 2018
- End date: March 10, 2020
- Legs: 4
- No. of shows: 85
- Supporting acts: Nile Rodgers & Chic (North America)
- Attendance: 933,526
- Box office: US$112,476,116

Cher concert chronology
- Classic Cher (2017–20); Here We Go Again Tour (2018–20)

The Here We Go Again Tour was the seventh solo concert tour by American singer-actress Cher in support of her twenty-sixth studio album Dancing Queen. This was the first time the singer had embarked on a world tour since her Living Proof: The Farewell Tour (2002–2005). The tour started on September 21, 2018, and was forced to conclude on March 10, 2020, after the breakout of the COVID-19 pandemic.

== Background ==
On May 7, 2018, it was announced via various media outlets that Cher would embark on her first Australian solo tour in more than a decade and her seventh solo concert tour overall. On May 17, 2018, it was announced that Cher would add two more dates in Melbourne and Sydney due to "overwhelming demand". On June 27, 2018, it was announced that Cher will visit New Zealand for a concert before continuing the tour in Australia. A second concert in New Zealand was announced shortly after. On September 3, 2018, it was announced that Cher would "farewell Melbourne" for a "third and final show" on October 6, 2018, due to high demand. Later that same week, it was announced that Cher will take the Here We Go Again Tour to North America for 34 dates. The second leg of the tour started on January 17, 2019, in Florida and ended on May 30, 2019, in Vancouver.

On December 11, 2018, it was announced that Cher would tour Europe for the first time in 15 years. The European leg of the tour started on September 26, 2019, in Berlin, Germany and finished on November 3, 2019, in Belfast, Northern Ireland. Following this, Cher announced new tour dates in North America, beginning in Portland, Oregon on November 19, 2019. On March 12, 2020, Cher announced her spring tour dates would be postponed to the fall, amid the ongoing coronavirus pandemic, with the exception of Birmingham, Alabama, which was cancelled, due to planned renovations at the Legacy Arena during the rescheduled run. However, due to the persistence of the pandemic in the United States, the rescheduled dates were all canceled.

== Concert synopsis ==
A giant curtain is set up where, during the start of the concert, a video montage featuring many moments of Cher's career is projected onto it. After the intro ends and the curtain drops, Cher appears wearing a purple toga and a blue wig, while standing on a bedazzled arched lift performing "Woman's World". The song is followed by "Strong Enough" and a 15-minute on stage monologue where she infamously asks the crowd "what's your granny doing tonight?" She leaves for a costume change, while the "Gayatri Mantra" is played. She returns on a mechanical elephant lip syncing the last part, and then she gets off the elephant and she performs "All or Nothing". The next act is started with a video interlude of Cher and her late ex-husband, Sonny Bono, singing a medley of "Little Man" and "All I Ever Need is You". She starts performing "The Beat Goes On" followed by a brief speech where Cher talks about how she rarely performs the song "I Got You Babe" live with Bono joining her via a large-screen video monitor. A video interlude of Cher performing "You Haven't Seen the Last of Me" follows and the next act starts with her dancers performing a Burlesque-inspired dance routine. Finally, Cher enters the stage in a Burlesque inspired outfit and sings "Welcome to Burlesque", followed by a costume change, with "Lie to Me" acrobatic interlude. She and her dancers reappear in 70's inspired clothes as she sings her covers of ABBA's "Waterloo" and "SOS". Cher then goes to an elevated platform and sings "Fernando", accompanied by a backdrop of fireworks.

After a video montage of her career highlights as an actress, the next act sees Cher performing "After All". An interlude of "Heartbreak Hotel" plays as Cher changes costumes and sings "Walking In Memphis", which she dedicated to the first time she saw Elvis in concert. "The Shoop Shoop Song (It's in His Kiss)" ends the act, and a guitar solo of "Bang Bang (My Baby Shot Me Down)" plays as a final intermission. Cher, in a black see-through bodysuit, appears to close the main set with performances of "I Found Someone" and "If I Could Turn Back Time". She leaves, and after a minute, returns to close the show with an encore performance of "Believe".

== Commercial reception ==
Cher, with the Here We Go Again Tour, was the third top-grossing female touring artist of 2019 and ranked at number 11 on Billboard's Year End Top 40 Tours. Pollstar's Year End Top 100 Tours chart ranked Cher at number 20. In 2019, Cher became the first female artist in history with the age of over 70 to gross over $100 million in one concert tour.

== Critical reception ==
The tour has received mostly positive reception from critics, praising Cher's vocals as well as the elements of the show and the costume changes. The European leg of the tour gained critical acclaim praising Cher's energy, performances, and humor. The tour was nominated for a People's Choice Award in the "Favorite Concert Tour of 2019" category.

== Set list ==
The following set list is from the concert on January 17 in Estero, Florida. It does not represent all shows.

1. "Woman's World"
2. "Strong Enough"
3. "Gayatri Mantra" (dancers interlude)
4. "All or Nothing"
5. "All I Ever Need Is You" / "Little Man" (video interlude)
6. "The Beat Goes On"
7. "I Got You Babe"
8. "You Haven't Seen the Last of Me" (video interlude)
9. "Welcome to Burlesque"
10. "Lie To Me" (interlude)
11. "Waterloo"
12. "SOS"
13. "Fernando"
14. "After All"
15. "Heartbreak Hotel" (musical interlude)
16. "Walking in Memphis"
17. "The Shoop Shoop Song (It's in His Kiss)"
18. "Bang Bang" (musical interlude)
19. "I Found Someone"
20. "If I Could Turn Back Time"

Encore

21. "Believe"
Notes
- Cher performed "Gypsys, Tramps & Thieves", "Dark Lady", and "Half-Breed" during shows in 2018.

== Shows ==
List of 2018 concerts
Date (2018)	City	Country	Venue	Opening acts	Attendance	Revenue
September 21	Auckland	New Zealand	Spark Arena	DJ Andrew McClelland	16,020 / 16,710	$1,711,012
September 22	Auckland	New Zealand	Spark Arena	DJ Andrew McClelland	16,020 / 16,710	$1,711,012
September 26	Newcastle	Australia	Newcastle Entertainment Centre	DJ Andrew McClelland	5,520 / 5,718	$819,642
September 28	Brisbane	Australia	Brisbane Entertainment Centre	DJ Andrew McClelland	13,669 / 13,669	$1,748,280
September 29	Brisbane	Australia	Brisbane Entertainment Centre	DJ Andrew McClelland	13,669 / 13,669	$1,748,280
October 3	Melbourne	Australia	Rod Laver Arena	DJ Andrew McClelland	28,812 / 30,688	$3,467,164
October 5	Melbourne	Australia	Rod Laver Arena	DJ Andrew McClelland	28,812 / 30,688	$3,467,164
October 6	Melbourne	Australia	Rod Laver Arena	DJ Andrew McClelland	28,812 / 30,688	$3,467,164
October 9	Adelaide	Australia	Adelaide Entertainment Centre	DJ Andrew McClelland	7,163 / 7,500	$793,794
October 12	Perth	Australia	RAC Arena	DJ Andrew McClelland	13,132 / 13,132	$1,727,210
October 16	Wollongong	Australia	WIN Entertainment Centre	DJ Andrew McClelland	3,893 / 4,012	$526,301
October 18	Sydney	Australia	Qudos Bank Arena	DJ Andrew McClelland	21,791 / 22,547	$2,710,879
October 20	Sydney	Australia	Qudos Bank Arena	DJ Andrew McClelland	21,791 / 22,547	$2,710,879
October 21	Sydney	Australia	ICC Sydney Theatre	DJ Andrew McClelland	5,776 / 5,776	$473,641

List of 2019 concerts
Date (2019)	City	Country	Venue	Opening acts	Attendance	Revenue
January 17	Estero	United States	Hertz Arena	Nile Rodgers; Chic	5,725 / 5,780	$993,700
January 19	Sunrise	United States	BB&T Center	Nile Rodgers; Chic	13,774 / 14,231	$1,707,710
January 21	Orlando	United States	Amway Center	Nile Rodgers; Chic	11,782 / 11,790	$1,421,883
January 23	Jacksonville	United States	Jacksonville Veterans Memorial Arena	Nile Rodgers; Chic	10,024 / 10,024	$1,078,433
January 25	Duluth	United States	Infinite Energy Arena	Nile Rodgers; Chic	9,903 / 9,903	$1,404,811
January 27	Raleigh	United States	PNC Arena	Nile Rodgers; Chic	11,680 / 11,680	$1,076,880
January 29	Charlotte	United States	Spectrum Center	Nile Rodgers; Chic	12,021 / 12,021	$1,147,111
January 31	Nashville	United States	Bridgestone Arena	Nile Rodgers; Chic	13,262 / 13,262	$1,409,202
February 2	Biloxi	United States	Mississippi Coast Coliseum	Nile Rodgers; Chic	10,069 / 10,069	$1,278,410
February 4	Louisville	United States	KFC Yum! Center	Nile Rodgers; Chic	12,813 / 12,813	$1,319,776
February 6	Cleveland	United States	Quicken Loans Arena	Nile Rodgers; Chic	12,504 / 12,504	$1,179,772
February 8	Chicago	United States	United Center	Nile Rodgers; Chic	14,984 / 14,984	$2,009,018
February 10	Columbus	United States	Nationwide Arena	Nile Rodgers; Chic	13,794 / 13,794	$1,513,123
February 12	Detroit	United States	Little Caesars Arena	Nile Rodgers; Chic	11,695 / 11,695	$1,290,912
February 14	Indianapolis	United States	Bankers Life Fieldhouse	Nile Rodgers; Chic	11,484 / 11,484	$1,346,158
April 18	Pittsburgh	United States	PPG Paints Arena	Nile Rodgers; Chic	14,603 / 14,603	$1,584,708
April 20	Philadelphia	United States	Wells Fargo Center	Nile Rodgers; Chic	14,823 / 14,823	$1,849,979
April 22	Toronto	Canada	Scotiabank Arena	Nile Rodgers; Chic	15,657 / 15,657	$2,083,273
April 24	Ottawa	Canada	Canadian Tire Centre	Nile Rodgers; Chic	12,366 / 12,366	$1,095,738
April 26	Buffalo	United States	KeyBank Center	Nile Rodgers; Chic	14,371 / 14,371	$1,529,362
April 28	Boston	United States	TD Garden	Nile Rodgers; Chic	13,192 / 13,192	$1,786,640
April 30	Springfield	United States	MassMutual Center	Nile Rodgers; Chic	6,049 / 6,049	$959,190
May 2	Brooklyn	United States	Barclays Center	Nile Rodgers; Chic	13,971 / 13,971	$2,249,111
May 3	Newark	United States	Prudential Center	Nile Rodgers; Chic	13,374 / 13,374	$1,985,259
May 8	Grand Rapids	United States	Van Andel Arena	Nile Rodgers; Chic	10,410 / 10,410	$1,174,426
May 10	St. Louis	United States	Enterprise Center	Nile Rodgers; Chic	14,404 / 14,404	$1,617,911
May 12	Milwaukee	United States	Fiserv Forum	Nile Rodgers; Chic	11,719 / 11,719	$1,438,187
May 14	Omaha	United States	CHI Health Center Omaha	Nile Rodgers; Chic	12,876 / 12,876	$1,324,294
May 16	Sioux Falls	United States	Denny Sanford Premier Center	Nile Rodgers; Chic	10,415 / 10,415	$1,202,976
May 18	Saint Paul	United States	Xcel Energy Center	Nile Rodgers; Chic	15,191 / 15,191	$1,874,158
May 23	Saskatoon	Canada	SaskTel Centre	Nile Rodgers; Chic	8,233 / 8,233	$621,567
May 25	Edmonton	Canada	Rogers Place	Nile Rodgers; Chic	13,310 / 13,310	$1,302,866
May 28	Calgary	Canada	Scotiabank Saddledome	Nile Rodgers; Chic	11,669 / 11,669	$1,080,542
May 30	Vancouver	Canada	Rogers Arena	Nile Rodgers; Chic	13,604 / 13,604	$1,210,342
September 26	Berlin	Germany	Mercedes-Benz Arena	Bright Light Bright Light	11,599 / 12,311	$1,266,973
September 28	Antwerp	Belgium	Sportpaleis	Bright Light Bright Light	10,192 / 10,924	$1,114,603
September 30	Amsterdam	Netherlands	Ziggo Dome	Bright Light Bright Light	9,576 / 10,674	$1,092,907
October 3	Munich	Germany	Olympiahalle	Bright Light Bright Light; KidCutUp	10,218 / 10,943	$1,111,549
October 5	Cologne	Germany	Lanxess Arena	Bright Light Bright Light; KidCutUp	13,855 / 14,153	$1,336,597
October 7	Vienna	Austria	Wiener Stadthalle	Crimer; KidCutUp	10,092 / 10,642	$1,209,739
October 9	Zürich	Switzerland	Hallenstadion	Crimer; KidCutUp	6,806 / 9,500	$1,012,549
October 11	Mannheim	Germany	SAP Arena	Bright Light Bright Light; KidCutUp	7,868 / 8,192	$910,550
October 13	Hamburg	Germany	Barclaycard Arena	Bright Light Bright Light; KidCutUp	9,919 / 11,000	$1,072,640
October 15	Copenhagen	Denmark	Royal Arena	Bright Light Bright Light; KidCutUp	13,015 / 13,015	$1,699,053
October 17	Stockholm	Sweden	Friends Arena	Bright Light Bright Light; KidCutUp	27,025 / 27,025	$2,274,898
October 20	London	United Kingdom	The O_{2} Arena	Paul Young; KidCutUp	28,440 / 31,092	$4,383,106
October 21	London	United Kingdom	The O_{2} Arena	Paul Young; KidCutUp	28,440 / 31,092	$4,383,106
October 24	Manchester	United Kingdom	Manchester Arena	Paul Young; KidCutUp	11,900 / 13,611	$1,855,063
October 26	Birmingham	United Kingdom	Arena Birmingham	Paul Young; KidCutUp	11,296 / 13,255	$1,699,422
October 28	Glasgow	United Kingdom	SSE Hydro	Paul Young; KidCutUp	10,703 / 11,701	$1,673,094
October 30	Leeds	United Kingdom	First Direct Arena	Paul Young; KidCutUp	9,407 / 11,206	$1,557,972
November 1	Dublin	Ireland	3Arena	Paul Young	7,905 / 8,323	$1,374,840
November 3	Belfast	United Kingdom	SSE Arena	Spring Break	7,199 / 7,650	$935,368
November 19	Portland	United States	Moda Center	Nile Rodgers; Chic	13,399 / 13,399	$1,634,061
November 21	San Francisco	United States	Chase Center	Nile Rodgers; Chic	13,115 / 13,115	$1,739,513
November 23	Glendale	United States	Gila River Arena	Nile Rodgers; Chic	12,936 / 12,936	$1,608,662
November 25	Denver	United States	Pepsi Center	Nile Rodgers; Chic	11,402 / 11,402	$1,212,663
November 27	Chicago	United States	United Center	Nile Rodgers; Chic	12,161 / 12,161	$1,270,763
November 29	Toronto	Canada	Scotiabank Arena	Nile Rodgers; Chic	12,450 / 12,450	$1,212,479
December 3	New York City	United States	Madison Square Garden	Nile Rodgers; Chic	27,495 / 27,495	$3,842,660
December 4	New York City	United States	Madison Square Garden	Nile Rodgers; Chic	27,495 / 27,495	$3,842,660
December 6	Philadelphia	United States	Wells Fargo Center	Nile Rodgers; Chic	12,430 / 12,430	$1,469,074
December 8	Boston	United States	TD Garden	Nile Rodgers; Chic	11,511 / 11,511	$1,378,938
December 10	Washington, D.C.	United States	Capital One Arena	Nile Rodgers; Chic	8,638 / 8,638	$1,069,268
December 13	New Orleans	United States	Smoothie King Center	Nile Rodgers; Chic	11,829 / 11,829	$1,466,665
December 15	Houston	United States	Toyota Center	Nile Rodgers; Chic	11,640 / 11,640	$1,518,495
December 17	San Antonio	United States	AT&T Center	Nile Rodgers; Chic	12,666 / 12,666	$1,535,735
December 19	Dallas	United States	American Airlines Center	Nile Rodgers; Chic	13,312 / 13,312	$1,809,893

List of 2020 concerts
Date (2020)	City	Country	Venue	Opening acts	Attendance	Revenue
March 6	El Paso	United States	Don Haskins Center	Nile Rodgers; Chic	N/A	N/A
March 8	Edinburg	United States	Bert Ogden Arena	Nile Rodgers; Chic	N/A	N/A
March 10	Bossier City	United States	CenturyLink Center	Nile Rodgers; Chic	N/A	N/A
Total					933,526 / 958,130 (97%)	$112,476,116

== Cancelled shows ==
List of cancelled concerts, showing date, city, country, venue, and reason for cancellation
Date	City	Country	Venue	Reason
May 21, 2019	Winnipeg	Canada	Bell MTS Place	Illness
March 18, 2020	Birmingham	United States	Legacy Arena	Arena renovation during the rescheduled Fall 2020 leg
September 8, 2020 (Note: The concert on September 8, 2020, at the Amalie Arena in Tampa was originally scheduled to take place on March 26, 2020, but was postponed, and eventually canceled due to the COVID-19 pandemic.)	Tampa	United States	Amalie Arena	COVID-19 pandemic
September 10, 2020 (Note: The concert on September 10, 2020, at the Pensacola Bay Center in Pensacola was originally scheduled to take place on March 22, 2020, but was postponed, and eventually canceled due to the COVID-19 pandemic.)	Pensacola	United States	Pensacola Bay Center	COVID-19 pandemic
September 12, 2020 (Note: The concert on September 12, 2020, at the North Charleston Coliseum in North Charleston was originally scheduled to take place on March 20, 2020, but was postponed, and eventually canceled due to the COVID-19 pandemic.)	North Charleston	United States	North Charleston Coliseum	COVID-19 pandemic
September 14, 2020 (Note: The concert on September 14, 2020, at the Heritage Bank Center in Cincinnati was originally scheduled to take place on April 7, 2020, but was postponed, and eventually canceled due to the COVID-19 pandemic.)	Cincinnati	United States	Heritage Bank Center	COVID-19 pandemic
September 16, 2020 (Note: The concert on September 16, 2020, at the FedExForum in Memphis was originally scheduled to take place on March 16, 2020, but was postponed, and eventually canceled due to the COVID-19 pandemic.)	Memphis	United States	FedExForum	COVID-19 pandemic
September 18, 2020 (Note: The concert on September 18, 2020, at the Chesapeake Energy Arena in Oklahoma City was originally scheduled to take place on March 12, 2020, but was postponed, and eventually canceled due to the COVID-19 pandemic.)	Oklahoma City	United States	Chesapeake Energy Arena	COVID-19 pandemic
September 20, 2020 (Note: The concert on September 20, 2020, at the Simmons Bank Arena in North Little Rock was originally scheduled to take place on March 14, 2020, but was postponed, and eventually canceled due to the COVID-19 pandemic.)	North Little Rock	United States	Simmons Bank Arena	COVID-19 pandemic
September 22, 2020 (Note: The concert on September 22, 2020, at the Resch Center in Green Bay was originally scheduled to take place on April 13, 2020, but was postponed, and eventually canceled due to the COVID-19 pandemic.)	Green Bay	United States	Resch Center	COVID-19 pandemic
September 24, 2020 (Note: The concert on September 24, 2020, at the Kohl Center in Madison was originally scheduled to take place on April 9, 2020, but was postponed, and eventually canceled due to the COVID-19 pandemic.)	Madison	United States	Kohl Center	COVID-19 pandemic
September 26, 2020 (Note: The concert on September 26, 2020, at the Fargodome in Fargo was originally scheduled to take place on April 11, 2020, but was postponed, and eventually canceled due to the COVID-19 pandemic.)	Fargo	United States	Fargodome	COVID-19 pandemic
September 28, 2020 (Note: The concert on September 28, 2020, at the Wells Fargo Arena in Des Moines was originally scheduled to take place on April 16, 2020, but was postponed, and eventually canceled due to the COVID-19 pandemic.)	Des Moines	United States	Wells Fargo Arena	COVID-19 pandemic
September 30, 2020 (Note: The concert on September 30, 2020, at the Intrust Bank Arena in Wichita was originally scheduled to take place on April 22, 2020, but was postponed, and eventually canceled due to the COVID-19 pandemic.)	Wichita	United States	Intrust Bank Arena	COVID-19 pandemic
October 2, 2020 (Note: The concert on October 2, 2020, at the Sprint Center in Kansas City was originally scheduled to take place on April 18, 2020, but was postponed, and eventually canceled due to the COVID-19 pandemic.)	Kansas City	United States	Sprint Center	COVID-19 pandemic
October 4, 2020 (Note: The concert on October 4, 2020, at the Casper Events Center in Casper was originally scheduled to take place on April 24, 2020, but was postponed, and eventually canceled due to the COVID-19 pandemic.)	Casper	United States	Casper Events Center	COVID-19 pandemic
October 6, 2020 (Note: The concert on October 6, 2020, at the First Interstate Arena in Billings was originally scheduled to take place on April 26, 2020, but was postponed, and eventually canceled due to the COVID-19 pandemic.)	Billings	United States	First Interstate Arena	COVID-19 pandemic
October 8, 2020 (Note: The concert on October 8, 2020, at the Ford Idaho Center in Nampa was originally scheduled to take place on April 30, 2020, but was postponed, and eventually cancelled due to the COVID-19 pandemic.)	Nampa	United States	Ford Idaho Center	COVID-19 pandemic
October 10, 2020 (Note: The concert on October 10, 2020, at the Spokane Veterans Memorial Arena in Spokane was originally scheduled to take place on May 2, 2020, but was postponed, and eventually canceled due to the COVID-19 pandemic.)	Spokane	United States	Spokane Veterans Memorial Arena	COVID-19 pandemic
October 12, 2020 (Note: The concert on October 12, 2020, at the Angel of the Winds Arena in Everett was originally scheduled to take place on May 4, 2020, but was postponed, and eventually canceled due to the COVID-19 pandemic.)	Everett	United States	Angel of the Winds Arena	COVID-19 pandemic
October 14, 2020 (Note: The concert on October 14, 2020, at the Golden 1 Center in Sacramento was originally scheduled to take place on May 6, 2020, but was postponed, and eventually canceled due to the coronavirus pandemic.)	Sacramento	United States	Golden 1 Center	COVID-19 pandemic
October 17, 2020 (Note: The concert on October 17, 2020, at the Vivint Arena in Salt Lake City was originally scheduled to take place on April 28, 2020, but was postponed, and eventually canceled due to the COVID-19 pandemic.)	Salt Lake City	United States	Vivint Arena	COVID-19 pandemic
November 12, 2020 (Note: The concert on November 12, 2020, at the Pinnacle Bank Arena in Lincoln was originally scheduled to take place on April 20, 2020, but was postponed, and eventually canceled due to the ongoing COVID-19 pandemic.)	Lincoln	United States	Pinnacle Bank Arena	COVID-19 pandemic
December 5, 2020 (Note: The concert on December 5, 2020, at the American Airlines Arena in Miami was originally scheduled to take place on March 24, 2020, but was postponed, and eventually canceled due to the COVID-19 pandemic.)	Miami	United States	American Airlines Arena	COVID-19 pandemic

== Personnel ==
Adapted from the Here We Go Again Tour program credits.

- Cher – lead vocals
- Nick Cua – tour director
- Ollie Marland – musical director
- Bob Mackie – costume designer

Band

- Ollie Marland and Darrell Smith – keyboards
- Joel Hoekstra / Ben Mauro – guitar
- Ashley Reeves – bass
- Jason Sutter – drums
- Jodi Katz – background vocals
- Nikki Tillman – background vocals
- Jenny Douglas-Foote – background vocals

Dancers

- Ferly Prado – dancer
- Marlon Pelayo – dancer
- Daniel Dory – dancer
- Melanie Lewis-Yribar – dancer
- Jamal Story – dancer
- Ben Bigler – dancer
- Britta Grant – dancer
- Bailey Swift – dancer
- Sumayah McRae – dancer
- SheilaJoy Burford – dancer
- Dujuan Smart Jr. – dancer
- Ryan Ramírez – dancer
