= Grodziec Castle =

Castle in Grodziec, Lower Silesian Voivodeship, Poland

Coordinates: 51°10′38.06″N 15°45′33.23″E

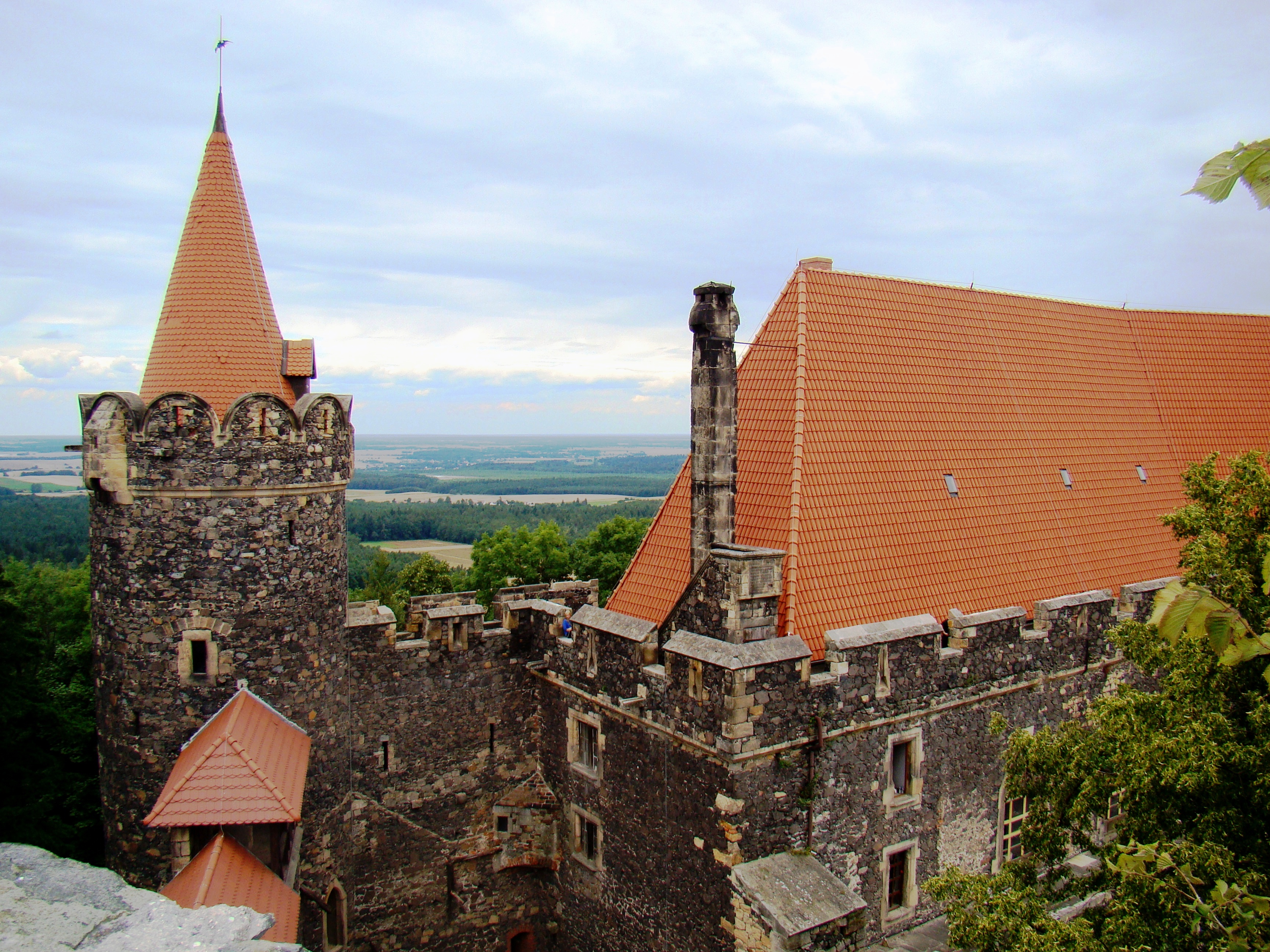
Grodziec Castle

Grodziec Castle (German: Gröditzburg or Gröditzberg) has a history dating back to 1155 and is located in the Silesia region of Poland.

== History ==
The first confirmed reference of Grodziec comes from Pope Adrian IV's bull of April 23, 1155. In 1175, Prince Bolesław I the Tall drew up a privilege for Cistercians from Lubiąż at the castle. In the time of his heir, Henryk I the Bearded, the wooden terrestrial castle was replaced by the building of a brick one. The foundation of the castle church is attributed to Saint Hedwig. In the 14th and partially in the 15th centuries the castle was the property of the knightly family of Busewoy.

In the period of the Hussite Wars, the building was captured and plundered by a Hussite detachment. In 1470, the Prince of Legnica, Friedrich I repurchased it. Master bricklayers brought from Wrocław and Görlitz gave the establishment its present-day spatial structure.

After the Prince's death by the order of his son, Friedrich II, work on the castle continued. It then become one of the most beautiful Gothic-Renaissance residences in Silesia. The final work coincided with the wedding of the Prince to Princess Sophie von Hohenzollern. A grand feast was held in the castle and a great knightly tournament outside was arranged.

In the time of the Thirty Years' War, the castle was captured and burned by the forces of Prince Albrecht von Wallenstein. Because of the amount of damage due to the war, the fortress was left with some parts of the stronghold missing.

In the 17th and 18th centuries efforts were made to rebuild Grodziec, however they were not completed. The Swiss art dealer Martin Usteri acquired 32 glass panes in 1796, which were sold from his legacy in 1829, and thereafter installed in the Gröditzberg castle. From there, six of the former stained glass windows of the Augustinerkloster Zürich were bought by the Gottfried Keller Stiftung in 1894, exhibited in the cloister of the Fraumünster cathedral in Zürich, and then entrusted to the Swiss National Museum on deposit.

In the 19th century, when the owner of property became Prince Hans Heinrich XV von Hochberg-Pless from Książ, more work of preservation and reconstruction was taken up. Reconstruction was stopped during the Napoleonic Wars, but in the mid-1830s the castle became an object of many tourist excursions. At this time, it developed the reputation of being one of the most attractive historical buildings in Europe.

Reconstruction was started again in the 20th century, when Willibald von Dirksen became the owner of the castle. He ordered an elaboration of the design to the most well-known and respected architect and conservator, Bodo Ebhardt, who also supervised the work. In 1908, Emperor Wilhelm II was a guest during the solemn reopening of the castle after the completion of renovations. The castle was inherited by Dirksen's son, Herbert von Dirksen, who become a prominent German diplomat serving as the ambassador to the Soviet Union, Japan and Great Britain. At the end of World War II in 1945, the castle, with some of its possessions, was burnt.

The castle was later transferred to Silesian Society of History and Antiquarianism Lovers for use as a museum, restaurant and a shelter-home.

As of 2006, the castle is partly in ruins, but also features a hotel, splendid eatery services, as well as many medieval tournaments featuring jousting and sword fighting.

== Gallery ==
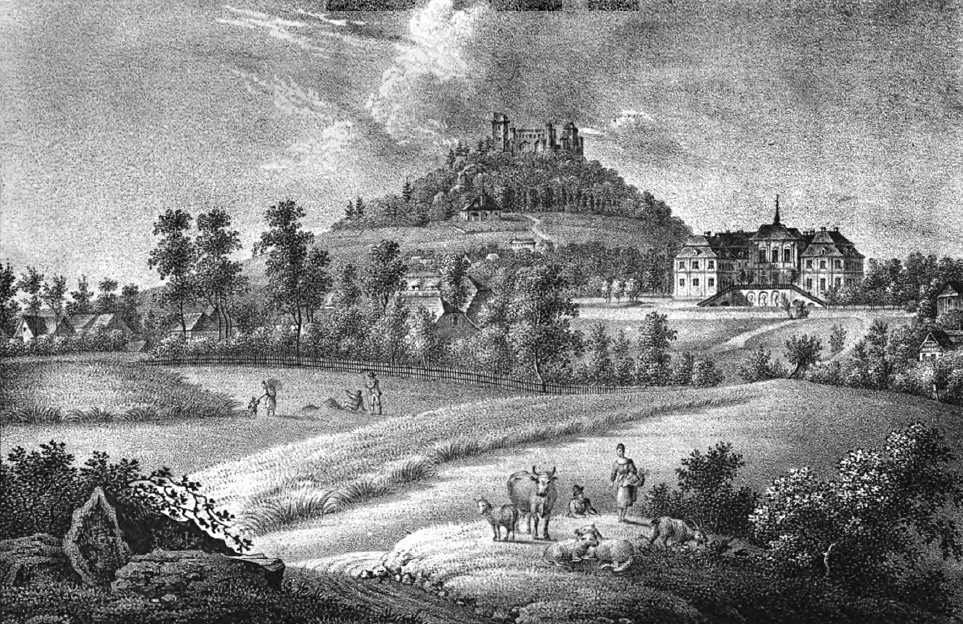
Grodziec Castle, 1837

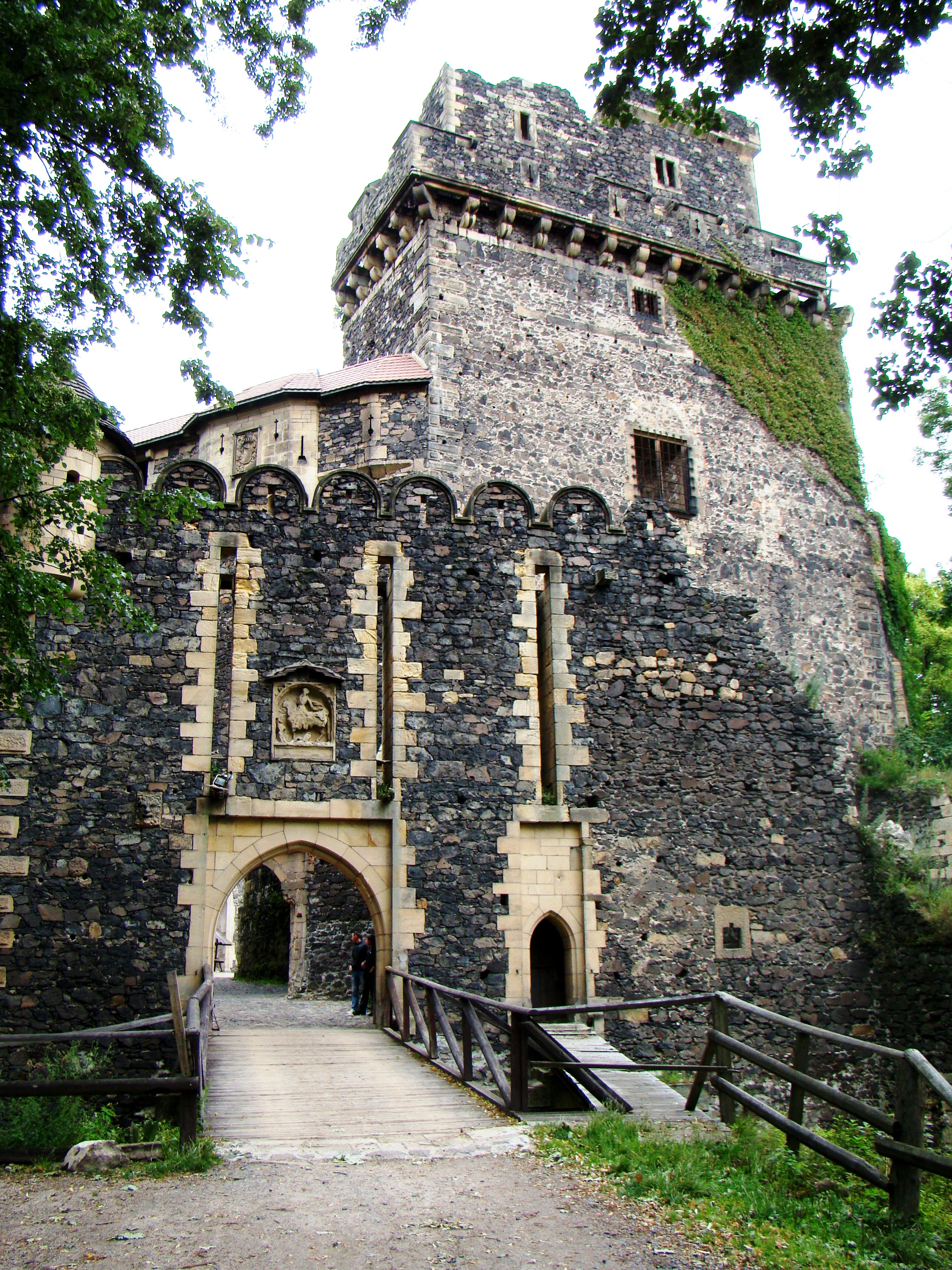
Castle gate

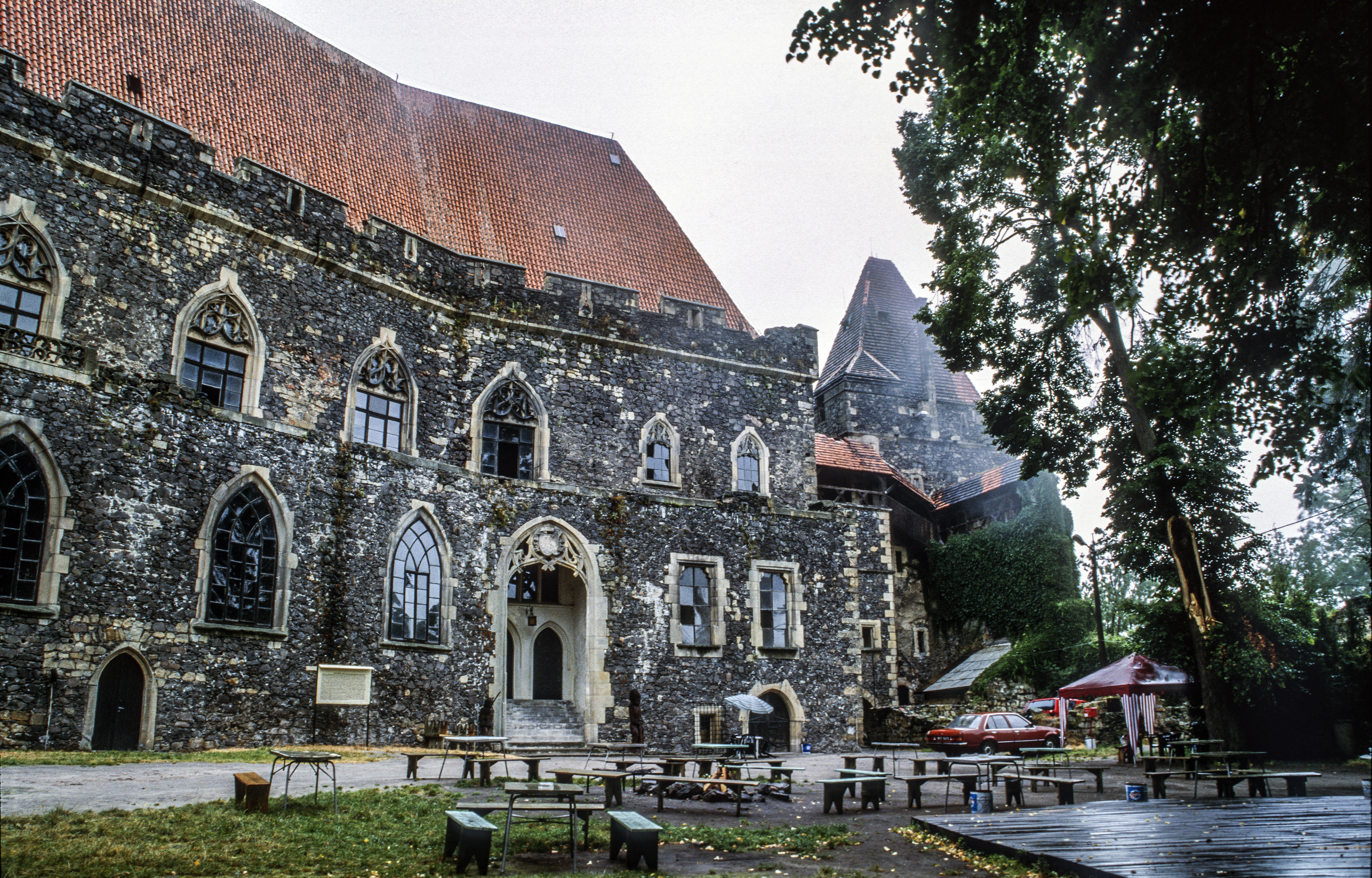
Castle courtyard

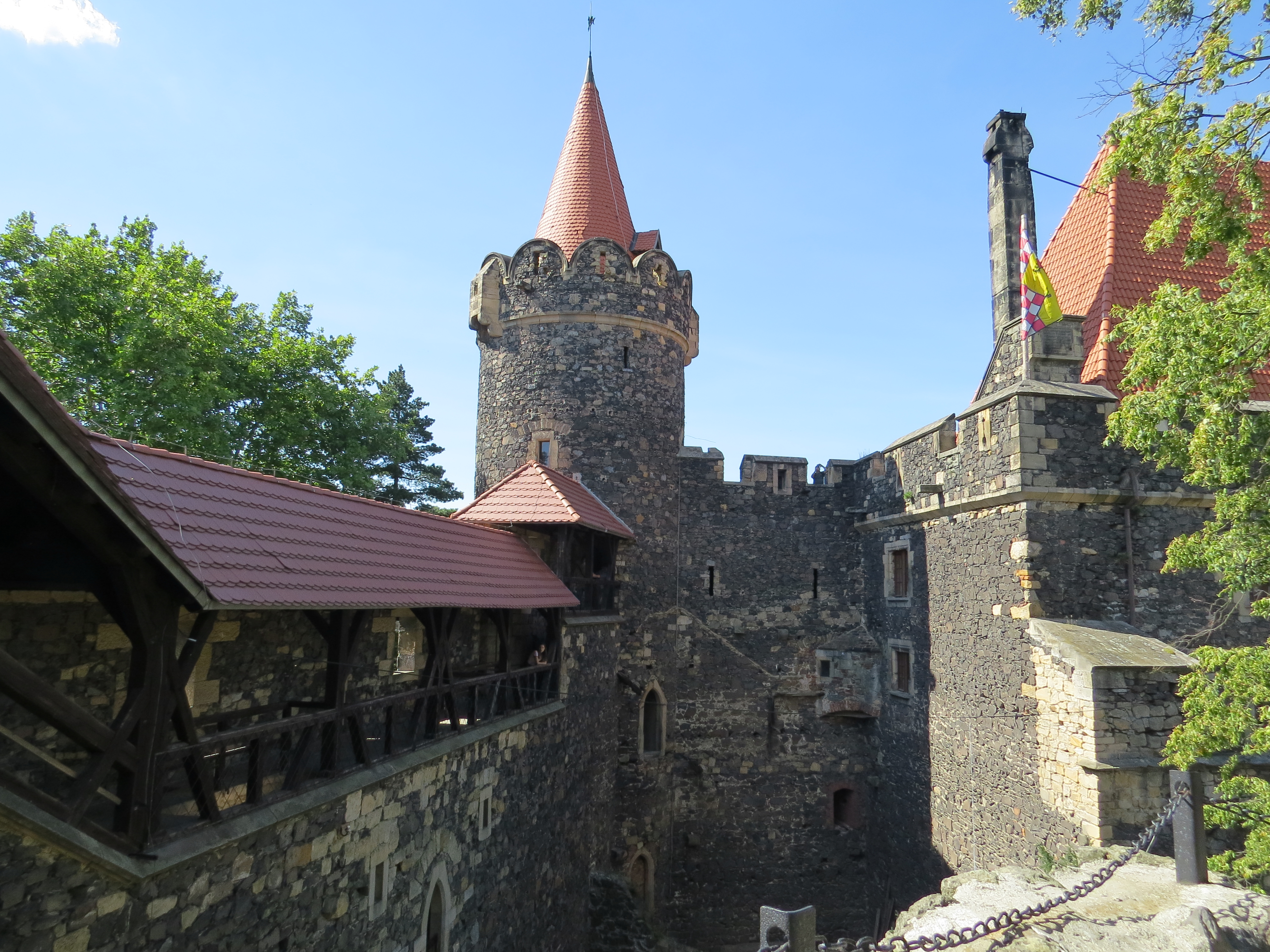
Tower

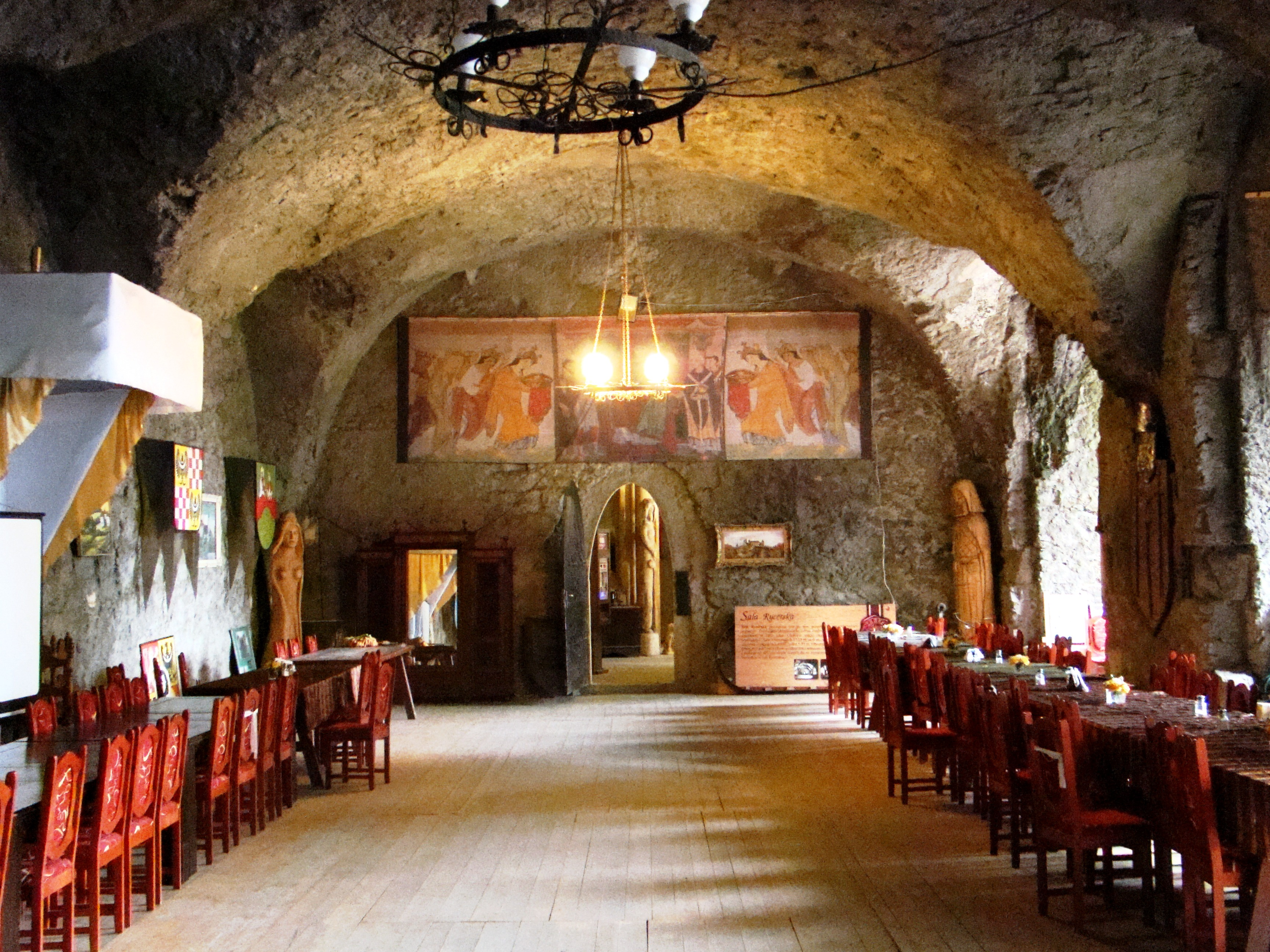
Interior

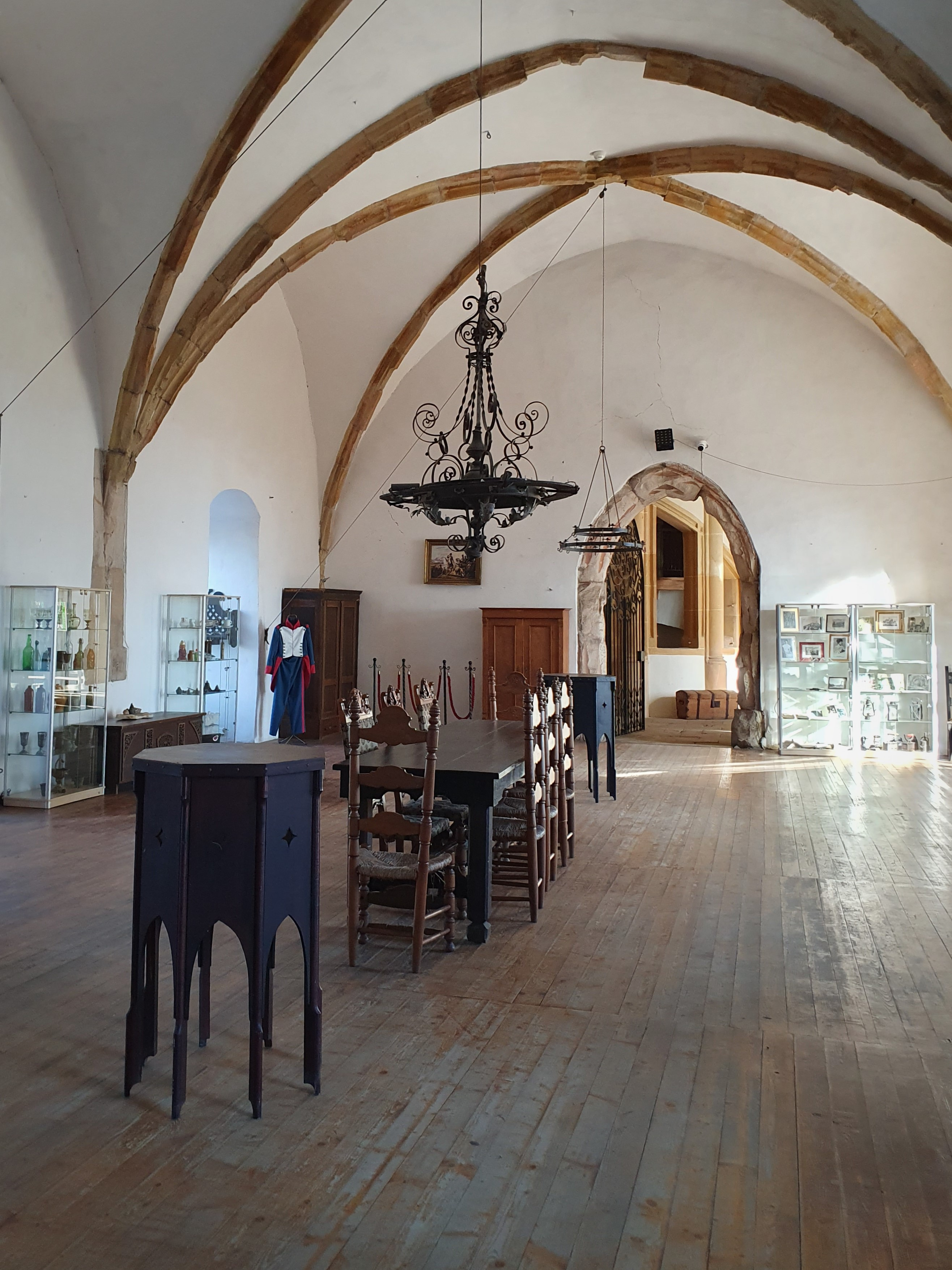
Interior

== See also ==
- List of castles in Poland
