= World Tour =

World Tour may refer to:

== Sports ==
International sports world tours and series

- Diamond League, Athletics
- BWF World Tour, Badminton
- FIVB Beach Volleyball World Tour, Beach volleyball
- World Tour (bodyboarding)
- Rugby sevens
  - IRB Sevens World Series, men
  - IRB Women's Sevens World Series
- ASP World Tour, Surfing
- ISU Short Track World Tour, Short track speed skating
- Squash
  - PSA World Tour, men
  - WSA World Tour, women
  - World Junior Squash Circuit
- ITTF World Tour, Table tennis
- Tennis
  - ATP World Tour, men
  - WTA Tour, women
- FINA Swimming World Cup, Swimming
- UCI World Tour, the premier annual male elite road cycling tour

== Music ==
=== Tours ===
- World Tour (Bananarama), the second concert tour by Bananarama, 1989
- World Tour (Mary J. Blige), Music Saved My Life Tour, eighth concert tour by Mary J. Blige, 2010–2011
- The Forget Tomorrow World Tour, the 2024-2025 concert tour by Justin Timberlake
- The Garth Brooks World Tour, multiple concert tours by Garth Brooks
- The World Tour (Jay Chou), concert tour by Jay Chou, 2007–2009
- The World Tour (Def Leppard and Mötley Crüe), the co-headlining tour by Def Leppard and Mötley Crüe, 2023
- Pentatonix: The World Tour, ninth concert tour by Pentatonix, 2019–2023
- Happier Than Ever, The World Tour, sixth concert tour by Billie Eilish, 2022–2023
- Wonder: The World Tour, fifth concert tour by Shawn Mendes, 2022
- PTV/SWS World Tour, the co-headlining tour by Pierce the Veil and Sleeping with Sirens, 2014–2015

=== Albums ===
- World Tour, by Joe Zawinul, 1998
- World Tour E.P., by Echo and the Bunnymen, 1997

=== Songs ===
- "World Tour", by Wale featuring Jazmine Sullivan from the album Attention Deficit
- "World Tours", by the Game, formerly released with the album Drillmatic – Heart vs. Mind
- "World Tour (Aquafina)", by Juice WRLD from the EP The Pre-Party

== See also ==
- Concert tour
- The Mask: World Tour, a 1995–96 comic book limited series published by Dark Horse Comics
- Guitar Hero World Tour, a multi-platform music video game
- Mario Golf: World Tour, a Nintendo 3DS golf video game
- Total Drama World Tour, the third season of the Total Drama series
