= The Garth Brooks World Tour =

The Garth Brooks World Tour may refer to three different concert tours by American country pop musician Garth Brooks:

- The Garth Brooks World Tour (1993–1994)
- The Garth Brooks World Tour (1996–1998)
- The Garth Brooks World Tour (2014–2017)
