= List of ambassadors of Germany =

Ambassadors of Germany:

== Current ambassadors ==
As of November 2026:

| Country | Seat | Holder | Took office | List |
|---|---|---|---|---|
| Afghanistan | Kabul | currently none | — | List |
| Albania | Tirana | Karlfried Bergner | 2023 | List |
| Algeria | Algiers | Georg Felsheim | 2024 | List |
| Andorra | See Spain | | | List |
| Angola | Luanda | Stefan Traumann | 2021 | List |
| Antigua and Barbuda | See Trinidad and Tobago | | | List |
| Argentina | Buenos Aires | Catalina Cullas | 2026 | List |
| Armenia | Yerevan | Claudia Busch | 2024 | List |
| Australia | Canberra | Beate Grzeski | 2023 | List |
| Austria | Vienna | Vito Cecere | 2023 | List |
| Azerbaijan | Baku | Dirk Lölke | 2026 | List |
| Bahamas | See Jamaica | | | List |
| Bahrain | Manama | Henning Simon | 2025 | List |
| Bangladesh | Dhaka | Rüdiger Lotz | 2025 | List |
| Barbados | See Trinidad and Tobago | | | List |
| Belarus | Minsk | currently none | — | List |
| Belgium | Brussels | Martin Kotthaus | 2018 | List |
| Belize | See Guatemala | | | List |
| Benin | Cotonou | Stefan Buchwald | 2023 | List |
| Bhutan | See India | | | List |
| Bolivia | La Paz | José Schulz | 2022 | List |
| Bosnia and Herzegovina | Sarajevo | Alfrad Grannas | 2025 | List |
| Botswana | Gaborone | Gabriela Bennemann | 2024 | List |
| Brazil | Brasília | Patricia Flor | 2026 | List |
| Brunei | Bandar Seri Begawan | Weert Börner | 2025 | List |
| Bulgaria | Sofia | Irene Maria Plank | 2023 | List |
| Burkina Faso | Ouagadougou | Dietrich Becker | 2024 | List |
| Burundi | Bujumbura | Hubertus Klink | 2026 | List |
| Cambodia | Phnom Penh | Silke Röfer | 2026 | List |
| Cameroon | Yaoundé | Christian Sedat | 2025 | List |
| Canada | Ottawa | Matthias Lüttenberg & Tjorven Bellmann | 2024 | List |
| Cape Verde | See Senegal | | | List |
| Central African Republic | See Cameroon | | | List |
| Chad | N’Djamena | Jens Kraus-Massé | 2025 | List |
| Chile | Santiago de Chile | Susanne Fries-Gaier | 2024 | List |
| China | Beijing | Philipp Ackermann | 2026 | List |
| Colombia | Bogotá | Martina Klumpp | 2023 | List |
| Comoros | See Tanzania | | | List |
| Democratic Republic of the Congo | Kinshasa | Alexander Fierley | 2026 | List |
| Republic of the Congo | Brazzaville | Michael Reuss | 2025 | List |
| Cook Islands | See New Zealand | | | List |
| Costa Rica | San José | Daniel Kriener | 2022 | List |
| Croatia | Zagreb | Pascal Hector | 2025 | List |
| Cuba | Havana | Frank Rückert | 2023 | List |
| Cyprus | Nicosia | Hans-Peter Jugel | 2025 | List |
| Czech Republic | Prague | Peter Reuss | 2025 | List |
| Denmark | Copenhagen | Anke Meyer | 2025 | List |
| Dominica | See Trinidad and Tobago | | | List |
| Dominican Republic | Santo Domingo | Maike Friedrichsen | 2022 | List |
| Djibouti | Djibouti | Frank Neumann | 2026 | List |
| East Timor | See Indonesia | | | List |
| Ecuador | Quito | Jens Lütkenherm | 2024 | List |
| Egypt | Cairo | Jürgen Schulz | 2024 | List |
| El Salvador | San Salvador | Friedo Sielemann | 2025 | List |
| Equatorial Guinea | See Cameroon | | | List |
| Eritrea | Asmara | n n | | List |
| Estonia | Tallinn | Jan Scheer | 2025 | List |
| Eswatini | See South Africa | | | List |
| Ethiopia | Addis Ababa | Birgitt Ory | 2025 | List |
| Fiji | Suva | Nicole Menzenbach | 2026 | List |
| Finland | Helsinki | Stephan Auer | 2024 | List |
| France | Paris | Stephan Steinlein | 2023 | List |
| Gabon | Libreville | Hans-Ulrich von Schroeter | 2025 | List |
| Gambia | Banjul | Klaus Botzet | 2023 | List |
| Georgia | Tbilisi | Barbara Voss | 2026 | List |
| Ghana | Accra | Frederik Landshöft | 2025 | List |
| Grenada | See Trinidad and Tobago | | | List |
| Greece | Athens | Andreas Kindl | 2023 | List |
| Guatemala | Guatemala City | Friederike Hellner | 2026 | List |
| Guinea | Conakry | Irene Biontino | 2024 | List |
| Guinea-Bissau | See Senegal | | | List |
| Guyana | See Trinidad and Tobago | | | List |
| Haiti | Port-au-Prince | Maike Friedrichsen | 2026 | List |
| Honduras | Tegucigalpa | Daniela Vogl | 2023 | List |
| Hungary | Budapest | Alexander Schönfelder | 2026 | List |
| Iceland | Reykjavík | Clarissa Duvigneau | 2023 | List |
| India | New Delhi | Jasper Wieck | 2026 | List |
| Indonesia | Jakarta | Ralf Beste | 2025 | List |
| Iraq | Baghdad | Daniel Krebber | 2025 | List |
| Iran | Teheran | Axel Dittmann | 2025 | List |
| Ireland | Dublin | David Gill | 2024 | List |
| Israel | Tel Aviv | Alexander Graf Lambsdorff | 2026 | List |
| Italy | Rome | Thomas Bagger | 2025 | List |
| Ivory Coast | Abidjan | Matthias Veltin | 2023 | List |
| Jamaica | Kingston | Jan Hendrik van Thiel | 2022 | List |
| Japan | Tokyo | Petra Siegmund | 2024 | List |
| Jordan | Amman | Bertram von Moltke | 2023 | List |
| Kazakhstan | Nur-Sultan | Heike Peitsch | 2026 | List |
| Kenya | Nairobi | Sebastian Groth | 2022 | List |
| Kiribati | See New Zealand | | | List |
| Kosovo | Pristina | Rainer Rudolph | 2025 | List |
| Kuwait | Kuwait City | Dirk Rotenberg | 2026 | List |
| Kyrgyzstan | Bishkek | Monika Lenhard | 2025 | List |
| Laos | Vientiane | Hans-Ulrich Südbeck | 2025 | List |
| Latvia | Riga | Gudrun Masloch | 2024 | List |
| Lebanon | Beirut | Thomas Zahneisen | 2026 | List |
| Lesotho | See South Africa | | | List |
| Liberia | Monrovia | Carsten Hölscher | 2026 | List |
| Libya | Tripoli | Arvid Enders | 2026 | List |
| Liechtenstein | See Switzerland | | | List |
| Lithuania | Vilnius | Cornelius Zimmermann | 2023 | List |
| Luxembourg | Luxembourg | Karsten Geier | 2026 | List |
| Madagascar | Antananarivo | Oliver Knoerich | 2024 | List |
| Malawi | Lilongwe | Ute König | 2023 | List |
| Malaysia | Kuala Lumpur | Silke Riecken-Darr | 2025 | List |
| Maldives | See Sri Lanka | | | List |
| Mali | Bamako | Corinna Fricke | 2025 | List |
| Malta | Valletta | Tanja Beyer | 2023 | List |
| Marshall Islands | See Philippines | | | List |
| Mauritania | Nouakchott | Florian Reindel | 2024 | List |
| Mauritius | See Madagascar | | | List |
| Mexico | Mexico City | Maria Margarete Gosse | 2026 | List |
| Micronesia | See Philippines | | | List |
| Moldova | Chișinău | Hubert Knirsch | 2025 | List |
| Monaco | See France | | | List |
| Mongolia | Ulaanbaatar | Thomas Graf | 2026 | List |
| Montenegro | Podgorica | Edgar Alfred Gansen | 2026 | List |
| Morocco | Rabat | Christian Heldt | 2026 | List |
| Mozambique | Maputo | Martina Hackelberg | 2026 | List |
| Myanmar | Yangon | currently none | — | List |
| Namibia | Windhoek | Thomas Wimmer | 2026 | List |
| Nauru | See Australia | | | List |
| Nepal | Kathmandu | Udo Volz | 2025 | List |
| Netherlands | The Hague | Tania Freiin von Uslar-Gleichen | 2026 | List |
| New Zealand | Wellington | Kristina Jonek | 2026 | List |
| Nicaragua | Managua | Karsten Warnecke | 2024 | List |
| Niger | Niamey | Timo Goosmann | 2025 | List |
| Nigeria | Abuja | Stefan Rößel | 2026 | List |
| Niue | See New Zealand | | | List |
| North Korea | Pyongyang | currently none | — | List |
| North Macedonia | Skopje | Petra Drexler | 2023 | List |
| Norway | Oslo | Christiane Hohmann | 2025 | List |
| Oman | Muscat | Monika Iwersen | 2026 | List |
| Pakistan | Islamabad | Ina Lepel | 2025 | List |
| Palau | See Philippines | | | List |
| Palestinian Territories | Ramallah | Anke Schlimm (envoy) | 2025 | List |
| Panama | Panama City | Joachim Schmillen | 2023 | List |
| Papua New Guinea | See Australia | | | List |
| Paraguay | Asunción | Gordon Kricke | 2024 | List |
| Peru | Lima | Sabine Bloch | 2022 | List |
| Philippines | Manila | Andreas Pfaffernoschke | 2023 | List |
| Poland | Warsaw | Miguel Berger | 2025 | List |
| Portugal | Lissabon | Daniela Schlegel | 2025 | List |
| Qatar | Doha | Oliver Owcza | 2025 | List |
| Romania | Bucharest | Angela Ganninger | 2025 | List |
| Russia | Moscow | Clemens von Goetze | 2026 | List |
| Rwanda | Kigali | Heike Uta Dettmann | 2023 | List |
| Saint Kitts and Nevis | See Trinidad and Tobago | | | List |
| Saint Lucia | See Trinidad and Tobago | | | List |
| Saint Vincent and the Grenadines | See Trinidad and Tobago | | | List |
| Samoa | See New Zealand | | | List |
| San Marino | See Italy | | | List |
| São Tomé and Príncipe | See Gabon | | | List |
| Saudi Arabia | Riyadh | Michael Kindsgrab | 2023 | List |
| Senegal | Dakar | Kai Baldow | 2025 | List |
| Serbia | Belgrad | Anke Holstein | 2026 | List |
| Seychelles | See Kenya | | | List |
| Sierra Leone | Freetown | Pascal Richter | 2025 | List |
| Singapore | Singapore | Bettina Fanghänel | 2024 | List |
| Slovakia | Bratislava | Thomas Kurz | 2024 | List |
| Slovenia | Laibach | Sylvia Groneick | 2024 | List |
| Solomon Islands | See Australia | | | List |
| Somalia | See Kenya | | | List |
| South Africa | Pretoria | Oliver Rentschler | 2026 | List |
| South Korea | Seoul | Georg Schmidt | 2023 | List |
| South Sudan | Juba | Sebastian Brökelmann | 2026 | List |
| Spain | Madrid | Heiko Thoms | 2026 | List |
| Sri Lanka | Colombo | Felix Neumann | 2023 | List |
| Sudan | Khartoum | Philipp Weidel | 2026 | List |
| Suriname | See Trinidad and Tobago | | | List |
| Sweden | Stockholm | Ludger Siems | 2025 | List |
| Switzerland | Bern | Markus Potzel | 2025 | List |
| Syria | Damascus | n. n. | | List |
| Thailand | Bangkok | Michael Reiffenstuel | 2026 | List |
| Taiwan | Taipei | Karsten Tietz ("General Director") | 2025 | List |
| Tajikistan | Dushanbe | York Schuegraf | 2023 | List |
| Tanzania | Dar es Salaam | Annett Günther | 2026 | List |
| Togo | Lomé | Stefan Messerer | 2026 | List |
| Tonga | See New Zealand | | | List |
| Trinidad and Tobago | Port of Spain | Peter Neven | 2026 | List |
| Tunisia | Tunis | Elisabeth Wolbers | 2024 | List |
| Turkey | Ankara | Sibylle Katharina Sorg | 2024 | List |
| Turkmenistan | Aschgabat | Petra Dachtler | 2026 | List |
| Tuvalu | See New Zealand | | | List |
| Uganda | Kampala | Sigrid Sommer | 2026 | List |
| Ukraine | Kyiv | Boris Ruge | 2026 | List |
| United Arab Emirates | Abu Dhabi | Tobias Tunkel | 2026 | List |
| United Kingdom | London | Susanne Baumann | 2025 | List |
| United States | Washington, D.C. | Jens Hanefeld | 2025 | List |
| Uruguay | Montevideo | Stefan Duppel | 2024 | List |
| Uzbekistan | Tashkent | Matthias Vollert | 2026 | List |
| Vanuatu | See Australia | | | List |
| Vatican City | Vatican City | Bruno Kahl | 2025 | List |
| Venezuela | Caracas | Volker Pellet | 2024 | List |
| Vietnam | Hanoi | Helga Barth | 2024 | List |
| Yemen | Sanaa | Thomas Schneider | 2025 | List |
| Zambia | Lusaka | Sönke Siemon | 2025 | List |
| Zimbabwe | Harare | Christoph Retzlaff | 2025 | List |

== Permanent representatives ==
- List of permanent representatives of Germany to NATO
- Permanent Representative of Germany to the United Nations

== See also ==
- List of current ambassadors of Germany (on German Wikipedia)
