= ADT =

ADT or Adt may refer to:

== Aviation ==
- Air Departure Tax, in Scotland
- Ada Municipal Airport in Oklahoma, US (IATA airport code ADT)

== Organizations and enterprises ==
- Abu Dhabi Terminals, abbreviated ADT, port operator for all commercial ports in Abu Dhabi
- Adirondack Trailways, an American bus company
- ADT College, in London
- ADT Inc., formerly American District Telegraph, which provides residential and small business electronic security and similar services in many countries

== People ==
- Ana de Teresa (born 2001), Spanish footballer known as ADT
- Harro Adt (born 1942), German diplomat
- Katrin Adt (born 1972), German business executive

== Places ==
- American Discovery Trail, a system of recreational trails in the US

== Science and technology ==
=== Biology and medicine ===
- Androgen deprivation therapy, a common component of treatment for prostate cancer
- Arogenate dehydratase, an enzyme
- Azadithiolate cofactor, an organosulfur compound found in some enzymes

=== Computing ===
- Abstract data type
- Algebraic data type, a composite type in computer programming
- Alternating decision tree, a machine learning method
- Android Development Tools, a plugin for the Eclipse IDE
- Asynchronous data transfer

=== Technology ===
- Active Denial Technology, a non-lethal, directed-energy weapon developed by the U.S. military
- Admission, discharge, and transfer system, a system for the structure of other types of business systems
- Automatic double tracking, an audio recording technology

== Sports ==
- Asian Development Tour, a golf tour
- Asociación Deportiva Tarma, a Peruvian association football club
- Azkals Development Team, a Filipino football club

== Other uses ==
- Adnyamathanha language, an Australian Aboriginal language (ISO 639-3 code "adt")
- American death triangle, a deprecated rock climbing anchor system
- Atlantic Daylight Time
- Average Daily Theoretical (also known as "theoretical loss" or "theo"), a calculation used to determine gamblers' casino comps
- Average Daily Traffic, used in transportation planning
- Advanced Dvorak Technique, a technique developed on the basis of the Dvorak technique to estimate the intensity of tropical cyclones
