= Hubert Jäger =

German diplomat

Hubert J. Jäger (born 18 March 1959) is a German diplomat. He has been serving as the German ambassador to Yemen since August 2021. He was the ambassador of Germany to Liberia from 2016.

== Education and career ==
Hubret was born on 18 March 1959 in Engen. After graduating from high school and doing military service, Hubert Jager studied from 1981 to 1984 at the Federal University of Applied Sciences for Public Administration of Foreign Affairs. He later worked in the Foreign Office and in various posts abroad until 1995. From 1995 to 1997 Jager completed the preparatory service for the higher foreign service and then worked as a consultant in the office of state secretaries in the foreign office. From 1999 to 2002 he served in the Office of the High Representative (OHR) in Sarajevo as Office Manager and Deputy Head of the Political Department. He was then permanent representative at the Representative Office in Ramallah and returned to the press department of the Federal Foreign Office in 2007. From 2007 to 2008 he worked as Civilian Representative & Head of the Mazar-e-Sharif branch of the Embassy in Kabul. From 2009 to 2012 he worked in the Federal Foreign Office as Head of the Task Force for the Palestinian Territories. After working at the Germany Embassy in Pretoria (2012-2016), he became Ambassador in Liberia from September 2016 to 2021. He has been serving as the German ambassador to Yemen since November 2021.

== See also ==
Lists of ambassadors of Germany
