= Kurt Krüger =

Kurt Krüger may refer to:

- Kurt Krüger (footballer)
- Kurt Krüger (diplomat)
