= Embassy of Germany, Kyiv =

Embassy of Germany in Ukraine
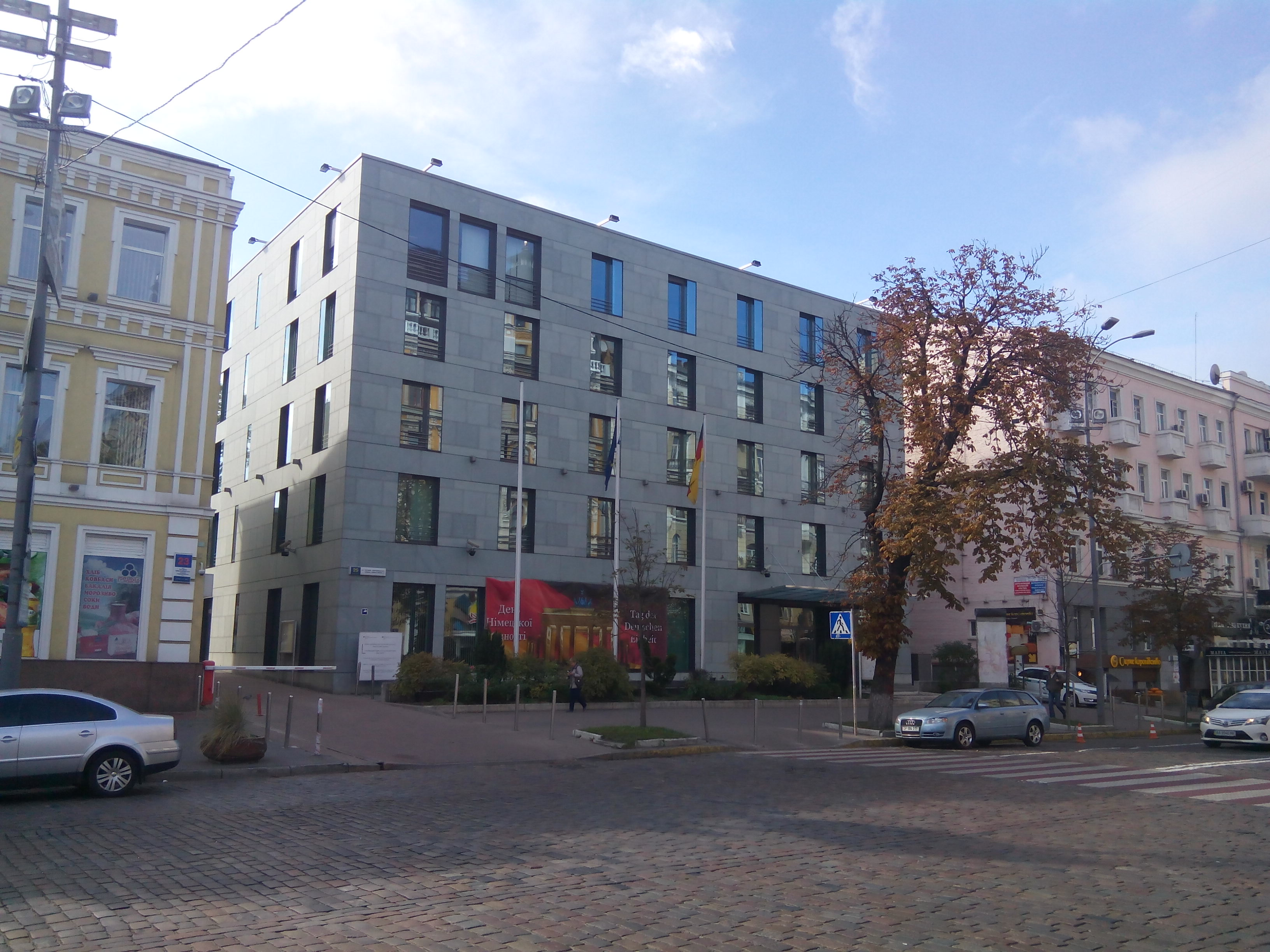
- Location: Kyiv
- Address: 25, Bogdana Khmelnitsky St., Kyiv, Ukraine, 01901
- Coordinates: 50°26′46″N 30°30′40″E
- Ambassador: Boris Ruge

The Embassy of Germany in Kyiv is Germany's diplomatic mission to Ukraine. The Federal Republic of Germany has since 1989 been officially represented in Ukraine, first by the Consulate General in Kyiv, and since January 1992, after the Ukrainian independence in 1991, with a diplomatic mission. Since March 2000, an honorary consul in Lviv also represents the interests of the Federal Republic of Germany. In July 2008, another honorary consul was appointed in Odesa, followed by an additional consulate general in Donetsk since the summer of 2009. The consulate general office in Donetsk was moved to Dnipro in 2014. In 2017, an honorary consul was appointed in Chernivtsi. The consulate general office Donetsk, located in Dnipro, has remained closed since the Russian invasion of Ukraine in 2022.

== Previous ambassadors ==
1. Alfons Mumm von Schwarzenstein (1918)
2. Johannes Graf von Berchem (1918-1919), Chargé d'Affaires
3. Hennecke Graf von Bassewitz (1992–1993)
4. Alexander Arnot (1993–1996)
5. Eberhard Heyken (1996–2000)
6. Dietmar Stüdemann (2000–2006)
7. Reinhard Schäfers (2006–2008)
8. Hans-Jürgen Heimsoeth (2008-2012)
9. Christof Weil (2012-2016)
10. Ernst Reichel (2016-2019)
11. Anka Feldhusen (2019-2023)
12. Martin Jäger (2023-2025)
13. Heiko Thoms (2025-2026)
14. Boris Ruge (since 2026)

== See also ==
- Germany-Ukraine relations
- Foreign relations of Germany
- Foreign relations of Ukraine
- Embassy of Ukraine, Berlin
- Diplomatic missions in Ukraine
