= Géza Andreas von Geyr =

German civil servant and diplomat

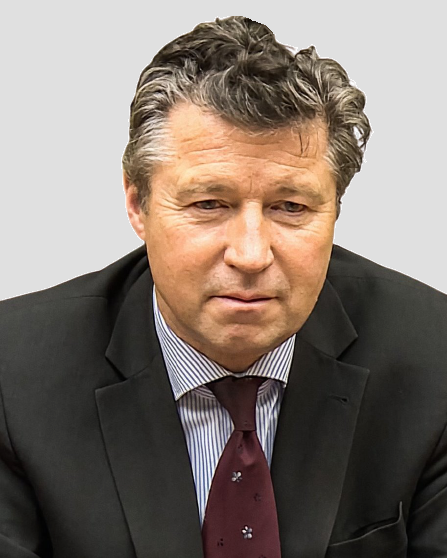

Permanent Representative of Germany to NATO
- Incumbent
- Assumed office August 2023
- Preceded by: Rüdiger König

Ambassador to Russia
- In office September 2019 – July 2023
- Preceded by: Rüdiger von Fritsch
- Succeeded by: Alexander Lambsdorff

Personal details
- Born: 1962 (age 63–64) Munich, West Germany

Géza Andreas von Geyr (born in 1962) is a German civil servant and diplomat. Since August 2023 he has been Permanent Representative of Germany to NATO and, as such, Germany's designated representative on the North Atlantic Council. He was previously German ambassador to Russia from 2019 to 2023.

== Biography ==
From 17 March 2014 to July 2019, von Geyr was head of the policy department in the Federal Ministry of Defense in the office of ministerial director.

From September 2019 to July 2023, Geyr was ambassador to Russia and headed the German Embassy in Moscow. He was succeeded by Alexander Graf Lambsdorff.

In August 2023, Geyr was appointed Permanent Representative of Germany to NATO and as such will become Germany's representative on the North Atlantic Council.
