= Jürgen Schulz =

Jürgen Schulz may refer to:

- Jürgen Schulz (footballer)
- Jürgen Schulz (diplomat)
