= Embassy of Germany, Paris =

Diplomatic mission of Germany in France

German Embassy, Paris
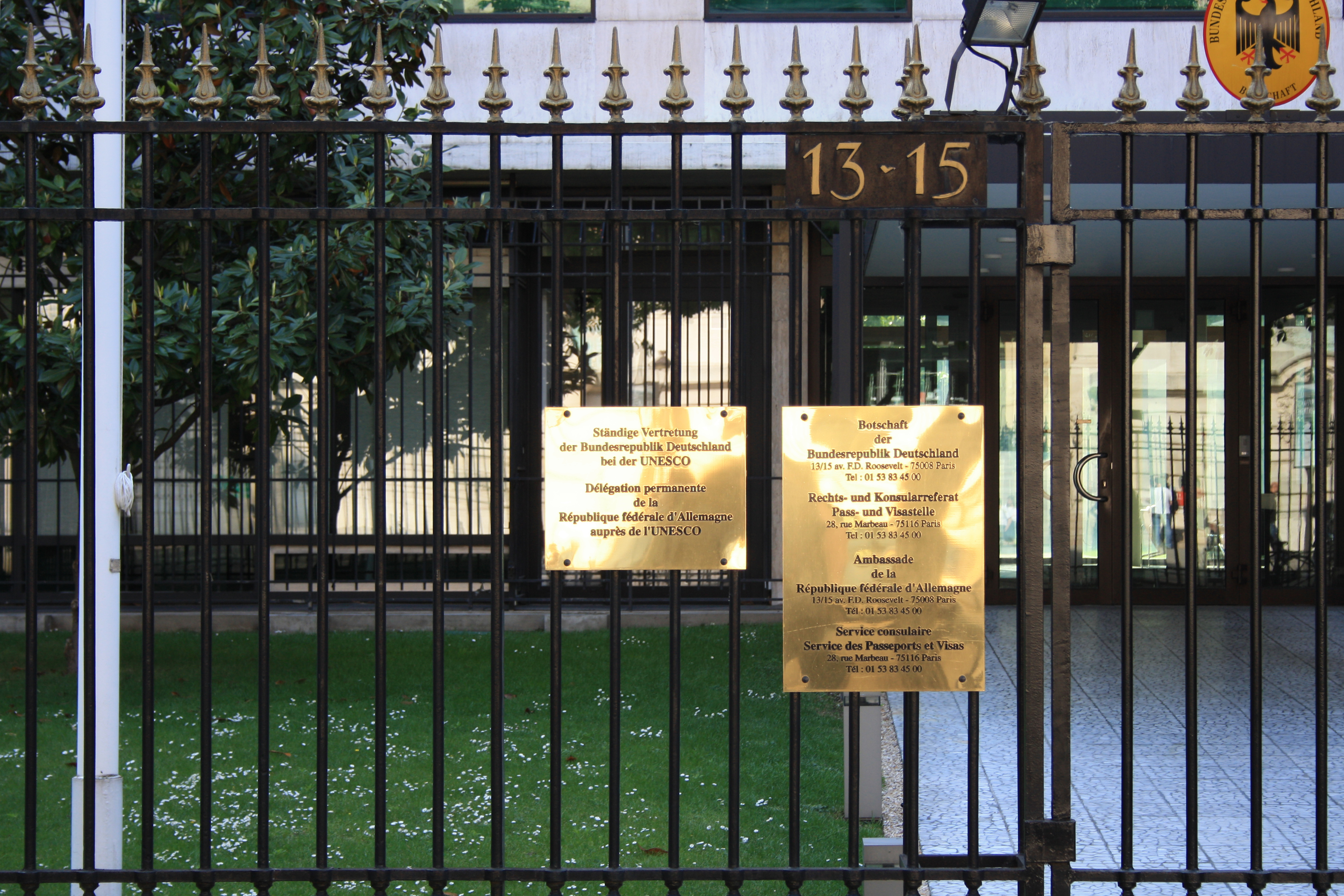
- Entrance of the German Embassy in Paris
- Location: Paris, France
- Address: 13–15 Avenue Franklin-D.-Roosevelt, 75008 Paris, France
- Coordinates: 48.8661889°N 2.3100302°E
- Ambassador: Hans-Dieter Lucas
- Website: German Embassy, Paris

The Embassy of Germany in Paris is the chief diplomatic mission of Germany in France. It is located on Avenue Franklin D. Roosevelt in the 8th arrondissement of Paris. The current German Ambassador to France is Hans-Dieter Lucas.

There are also Consulates-General in Bordeaux, Lyon, Marseille and Strasbourg.

== History ==
Following the Franco-Prussian War of 1870–71 and until the beginning of World War II, the embassy of the German Empire to the French Republic was located at Hôtel Beauharnais, the current residence of the German Ambassador.

=== Post World War II ===
The eight-story building of the chancellery of the German Embassy in Paris was constructed from 1960 to 1963.

== Ambassador's Residence ==
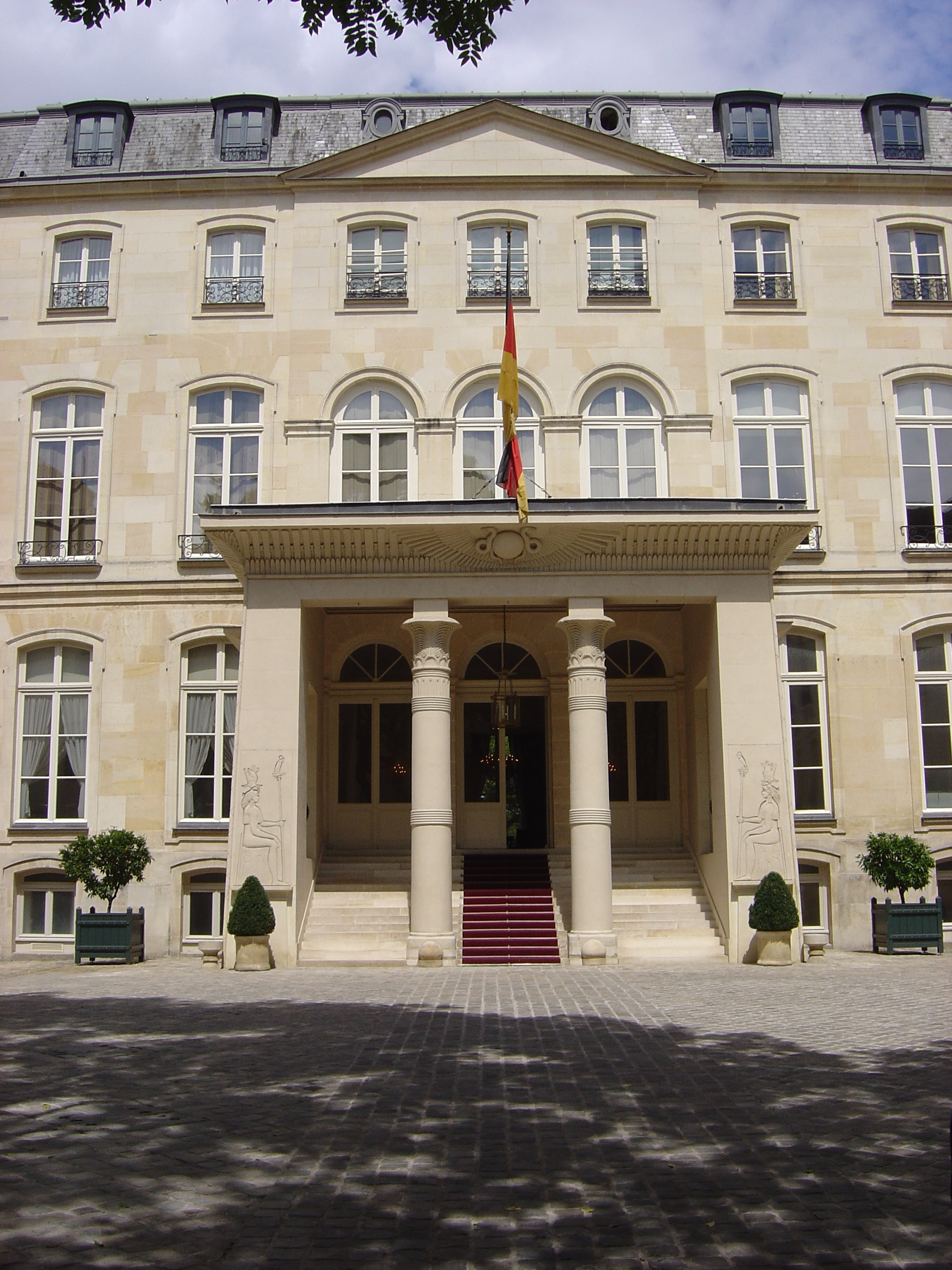
Portico of the Hôtel Beauharnais

The official residence of the German Ambassador to Paris is located at Hôtel Beauharnais in the 7th arrondissement of Paris. It was designed by architect Germain Boffrand. Its construction was completed in 1714. By 1803, the structure was purchased by Eugène de Beauharnais, who had it rebuilt in an Empire style. It has been listed as an official historical monument since July 25, 1951. During World War II, the building served as the Paris residence of Otto Abetz, German ambassador to Vichy France, until it was confiscated in 1944. Held by the French Ministry of Foreign Affairs, it was restored to West Germany in 1961 during the negotiations on the Élysée Treaty. As a new embassy then already was under construction on Avenue Franklin Delano Roosevelt, the building solely served for representative purposes.

== See also ==
- France-Germany relations
- List of diplomatic missions in France
- Embassy of France, Berlin
