= Germany and the Russo-Ukrainian war =

Chancellor Friedrich Merz with Ukraine President Volodymyr Zelenskyy, October 2026

Germany has supported Ukraine during the ongoing Russian invasion of Ukraine, during both Social Democratic and Conservative governments. After it began on 24 February 2022, then Social Democratic Chancellor Olaf Scholz condemned the invasion, provided military and humanitarian aid to Ukraine, and sanctioned Russia and Belarus, the two countries most involved in invading Ukraine. Support to Ukraine has continued under incumbent Conservative Chancellor Friedrich Merz.

== History ==
Olaf Scholz and Zelenskyy during the former's visit to Ukraine ten days before the invasion, 14 February 2022

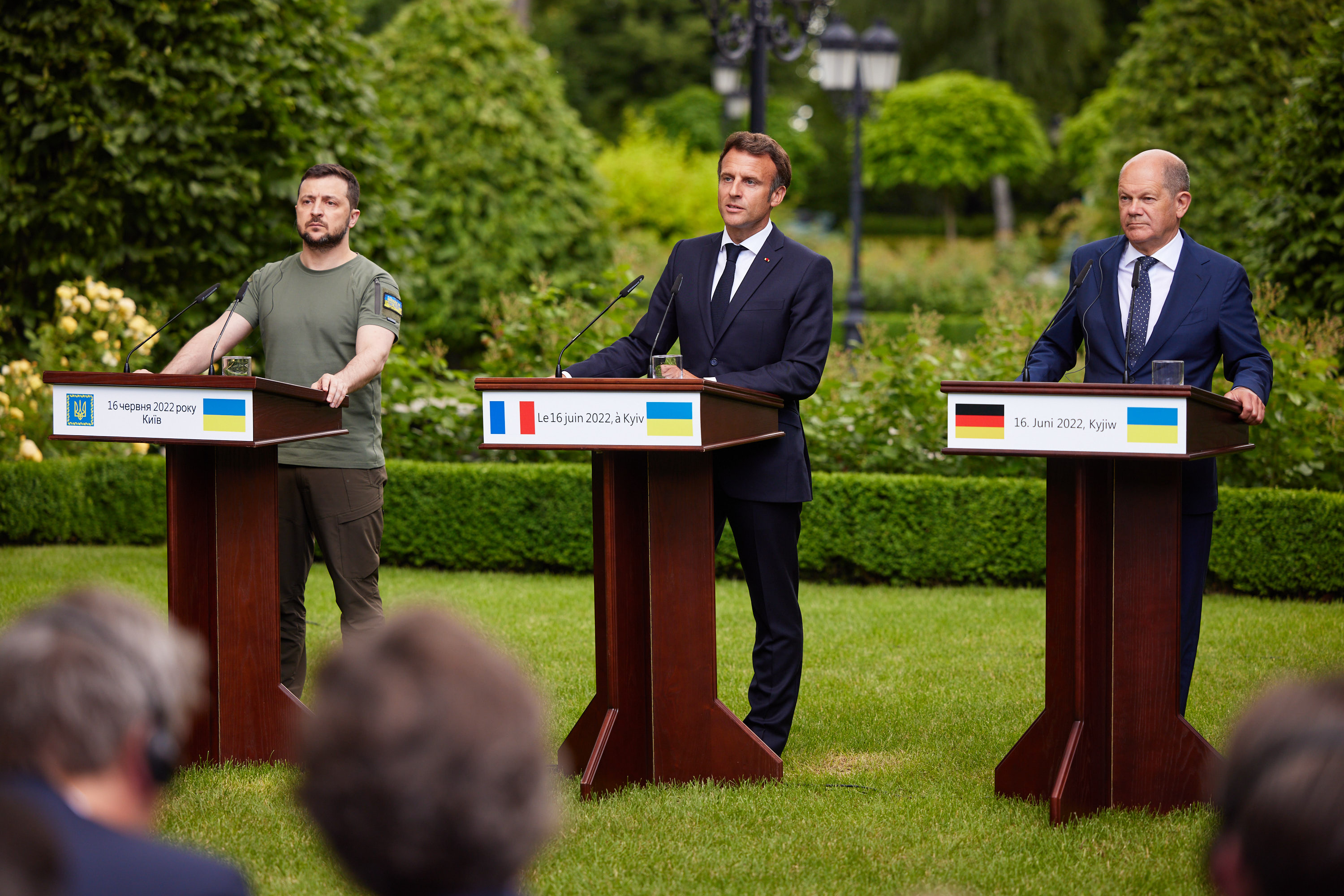
Scholz, Ukrainian President Volodymyr Zelenskyy and French President Emmanuel Macron in Kyiv in 2022

In December 2021 four days after Merkel had left office, Germany blocked arms supplies to Ukraine during the 2021–2022 Russo-Ukrainian crisis. In January 2022 after new chancellor Olaf Scholz had blocked an Estonian shipment of German-made arms to Ukraine, Ukraine's foreign minister Dmytro Kuleba criticised the German government for upholding the long-standing policy of not sending weapons into conflicted regions. Germany had stopped such exports to Ukraine in 2014. He stressed that while he respects Germany's reasoning for upholding their policy in reference to their past he "could not agree to it". Also in January, the German ambassador to Ukraine Anka Feldhusen was summoned to Ukraine's foreign ministry over comments by German navy chief Kay-Achim Schönbach; vice admiral Schönbach resigned as a result. Germany offered 5,000 helmets to Ukraine. The offer was ridiculed and the transfer was delayed. In February, Annalena Baerbock as a representative of Germany's foreign ministry requested German citizens to urgently leave Ukraine as Russia poised to invade Ukraine, Furthermore, after G7 meeting, she assured the united support by the group for Ukraine.

In January 2022, The New York Times reported intensifying concerns from the US and other NATO allies about the Scholz government's "evident hesitation to take forceful measures" against Russia in the run-up to its invasion of Ukraine.

The Scholz government initially refused to send weapons to Ukraine, citing existing German policy and financial support for the Eastern European country. As late as 15 February, Scholz was quoted by TASS as saying "the way out of the crisis in Ukraine is to implement the Steinmeier formula", a mechanism of granting a special status to the Donbas.

On 22 February 2022, Scholz announced that Germany would be halting its approval of the Nord Stream 2 pipeline in response to Russia's recognition of two self-declared separatist republics within Ukraine. Scholz spoke against allowing the European Union to cut Russia off from the SWIFT global interbank payment system.

Before the 24 February 2022 Russian invasion of Ukraine, Scholz rejected Ukraine's demands for weapons deliveries on 6 February, saying Germany "has for many years taken the clear stance that we do not deliver to crisis regions". The Russian invasion drastically changed German policy with regard to defense spending, aiding Ukraine and the nation's energy security.

On 26 February, following the 2022 Russian invasion of Ukraine, Scholz reversed his decision and pledged a supply of anti-tank weapons and Stinger missiles to Ukraine.

In an emergency meeting of the Bundestag on 27 February, Scholz made the Zeitenwende speech, announcing a complete reversal of German military and foreign policy, including the commencement of weapons shipments to Ukraine and a €100 billion increase in Germany's defense budget. Scholz succeeded in obtaining the two-thirds majority necessary to amend the debt ceiling to allow Germany to establish a 100 billion euro defense fund that would not be subject to the restrictions. One reporter called it a path to "an emergency military modernization, defence spending, energy independence from Russia, lethal assistance for Ukraine and EU financing for weaponry". However, in a press conference on 19 April, Scholz spoke about slowing Germany's provision of weaponry to Ukraine, which was seen as reducing the scale of the policy change.

Scholz greatly increased German defense expenditure. Three days after the invasion started, he announced in the Zeitenwende speech the creation of a one-off €100B fund for the Bundeswehr. This represented a major shift in German foreign policy, as Germany had long refused to meet the required spending of 2% of its GDP on defense, as is required by NATO. In addition to increasing defense spending for his own country, in an address to Germany's parliament on 23 March, Scholz emphasized support for aiding Ukraine in its resistance to Russian invasion.

With regard to supporting Ukraine and taking action against Russia, Scholz was trailing behind others. On 26 February 2022, he was the last of several EU leaders to continue opposition against kicking Russia out of the SWIFT international payment system. However, Germany did send some effective weapons to Ukraine. By 17 March about 2,000 portable missile weapons against tanks and aircraft had been sent. In his 23 March speech, Scholz claimed that Germany would "try everything we can until peace prevails again on our continent" including taking hundreds of thousands of Ukrainian refugees across German borders. Like most other NATO leaders, he declined to impose a no-fly zone, as that would probably draw NATO into a direct military conflict with Russia.

Apart from increasing defense spending and aiding Ukraine, the invasion also highlighted the dangers of relying on Russian gas. By 3 March 2022, Scholz had announced plans to build two new LNG terminals. Economy minister Habeck then visited Norway and on 19 March Qatar, one of the world's largest exporters of liquefied natural gas. Here he signed a long-term agreement about importing Qatari gas. Amid pressure to prohibit Russian gas imports across Europe, Scholz still refused to end German imports of Russian gas in the first days of April. A few days later, he said Germany was working on ending the import of Russian energy. He opposed a reversal of Germany's scheduled end to nuclear power, saying the technical challenges were too great.

In early April 2022 news of the Bucha massacre shocked public opinion in Europe. On 6 April Guy Verhofstadt got a lot of attention with a passionate speech about Ukraine before the European parliament. He ended it by accusing the German government of "dragging its feet" with regard to taking action against Russia. That same month, Germany policy changed and the chancellor avowed that Germany would provide Ukraine with more than €1B to spend on military resources. Scholz rejected a plan made by Vice Chancellor and Economy Minister Robert Habeck and Foreign Minister Annalena Baerbock to deliver 100 Marder Infantry fighting vehicles from German stocks to Ukraine. In April 2022, Ukraine rejected a request for an official visit by German President Frank-Walter Steinmeier who is widely perceived in Ukraine as being pro-Russian owing to his support for Nord Stream 2 and past comments accusing NATO of "warmongering".

In April 2022, Germany committed to sending armored anti-aircraft systems and armored vehicles to Ukraine. In May 2022, the German government committed to send seven PzH 2000 artillery pieces to Ukraine, with five more from the Dutch government. Ukrainian troops arrived in Germany five days later for training and the Ukrainian government subsequently placed an order to purchase a further 100 PzH 2000 howitzers from Germany.

From May 2022, the aid to Ukraine became increasingly significant. The rhetoric of the chancellor also began to change. On 9 May 2022, Scholz said that Russians and Ukrainians once fought together during World War II against Nazi Germany's "murderous National Socialist regime", but now "Putin wants to overthrow Ukraine and destroy its culture and identity... [and] even regards his barbaric war of aggression as being on a par with the fight against National Socialism. That is a falsification of history and a disgraceful distortion." On 16 June 2022, Scholz visited the Ukrainian capital Kyiv alongside French president Emmanuel Macron and Italian prime minister Mario Draghi to meet President Volodymyr Zelenskyy. They talked about various issues such as the war in Ukraine and Ukraine's membership into the EU. This comes as a reverse of his previous stance to not visit Ukraine, after Zelenskyy rebuked the German president Frank-Walter Steinmeier over his contribution to stronger Moscow-Berlin ties.

The first three Flakpanzer Gepard arrived in Ukraine on 25 July 2022. Thirty Gepards were delivered until 20 September 2022.

On 11 August, Germany, Latvia and Norway announced they would be joining the training programme. Due to this, the UK announced it would be possible to train more Ukrainians than initially planned. However, by November 2023, Germany had not sent any instructors and was excluded from a list of participating nations.

By 1 September 2022, the actual volume of German arms deliveries to Ukraine was only exceeded by that of deliveries by the United States and the United Kingdom. The verdict was that, "based on these statistics, Berlin had ultimately positioned itself as a reliable partner of Ukraine." However, it "could also be argued that Berlin's communication to affirm its Ukraine stance and explain its foreign policy goals had been nothing short of an unmitigated disaster".

In January 2023, the German government resisted pressure from its NATO allies, especially the United States and Poland, to agree to provide Leopard 2 battle tanks to Ukraine, however it eventually agreed to send the tanks and also allowed Poland to send its Leopard 2 tanks. In April 2023, Germany expelled 50 Russian diplomats, the action was reportedly taken "in order to reduce the presence of Russian intelligence in Germany". Russia closed four of the five Russian Consulates in Germany. The Russian Ministry of Foreign Affairs responded by expelling 34 German diplomats from Moscow, stating that Germany "continues to demonstratively destroy the entire array of Russian-German relations". In May 2023, the German Foreign Ministry stated that hundreds of Germans would be expelled from Moscow at the beginning of June, this due to a decision by Russia to cap the number of German employees in the country. Those expelled include employees from the German School Moscow. Germany closed consulates general in Novosibirsk and Yekaterinburg on 1 December 2023, having already closed the one in Kaliningrad.

In 2022, Scholz stated that Russian deserters and draft evaders who refused to take part in the Russian invasion of Ukraine and fled Russia should be given protection in Germany. However, in 2024, German authorities ordered the deportation of Russian nationals who wanted to avoid mobilization and criticized Putin's government on the grounds that they would not face persecution in Russia.

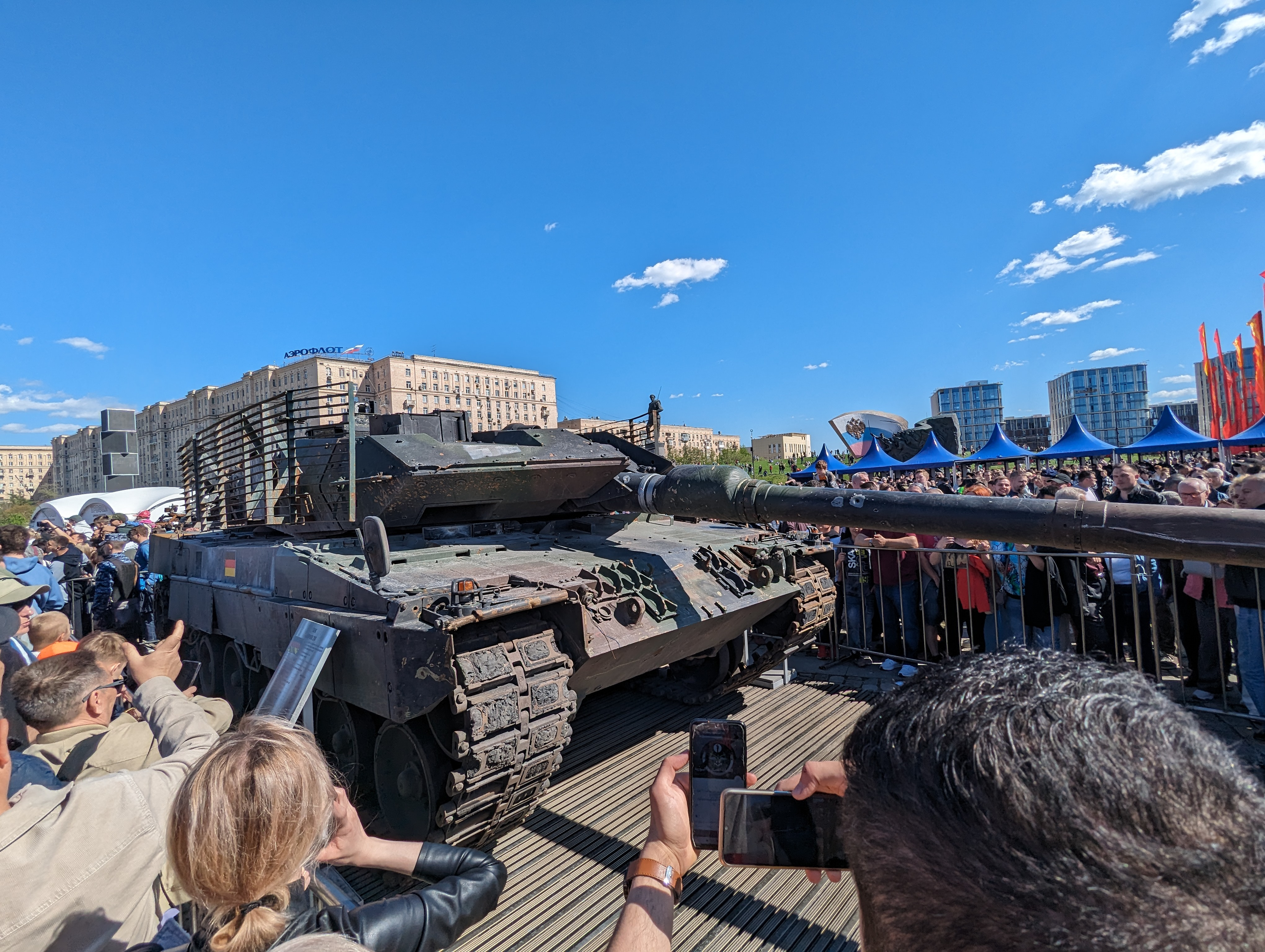
A captured German-supplied Leopard 2 main battle tank in Ukrainian service on display at Moscow's Victory Park on Poklonnaya Hill, 2024

In May 2024, Scholz gave Ukraine permission to strike targets inside Russia with German-supplied weapons.

In July 2024, the United States announced its intention to deploy long-range missiles in Germany from 2026 that could hit Russian territory within 10 minutes. In response, Russian President Putin warned of a Cold War-style missile crisis and threatened to deploy long-range missiles within striking distance of the West. US weapons in Germany would include SM-6 and Tomahawk cruise missiles and hypersonic weapons. The United States' decision to deploy long-range missiles in Germany has been compared to the deployment of Pershing II launchers in Western Europe in 1979. The decision was supported by German Chancellor Olaf Scholz and German Defense Minister Boris Pistorius. Critics say the move would trigger a new arms race. According to Russian military analysts, it would be extremely difficult to distinguish between a conventionally armed missile and a missile carrying a nuclear warhead, and Russia could respond by deploying longer-range nuclear systems targeting Germany.

In July 2024, Russian President Vladimir Putin warned of a Cold War-style missile crisis and threatened to deploy long-range missiles within striking distance of the West after the United States announced its intention to deploy long-range missiles in Germany starting in 2026 that could hit Russian territory within 10 minutes. US weapons in Germany would include SM-6 and Tomahawk cruise missiles and developmental hypersonic weapons. Scholz supported the decision to place US long-range missiles in Germany, but his government's move was criticized by the political opposition as well as within Scholz's coalition. Critics say the move would trigger a new arms race. Biden and Scholz's plan to deploy long-range missiles in Germany has been compared to the deployment of Pershing II launchers in Western Europe in 1979.

In October 2024, Chancellor Olaf Scholz has gone on record to say that Germany does not support Victory Plan for Ukraine, the idea of inviting Ukraine to NATO during wartime.

In a phone call in November 2024, Scholz urged Putin to withdraw his forces from Ukraine and begin talks aiming at a "just and lasting peace". The call was sharply criticized by Zelenskyy, who considered it as undermining efforts to isolate Putin. Several European officials were said to have cautioned Scholz against the move.

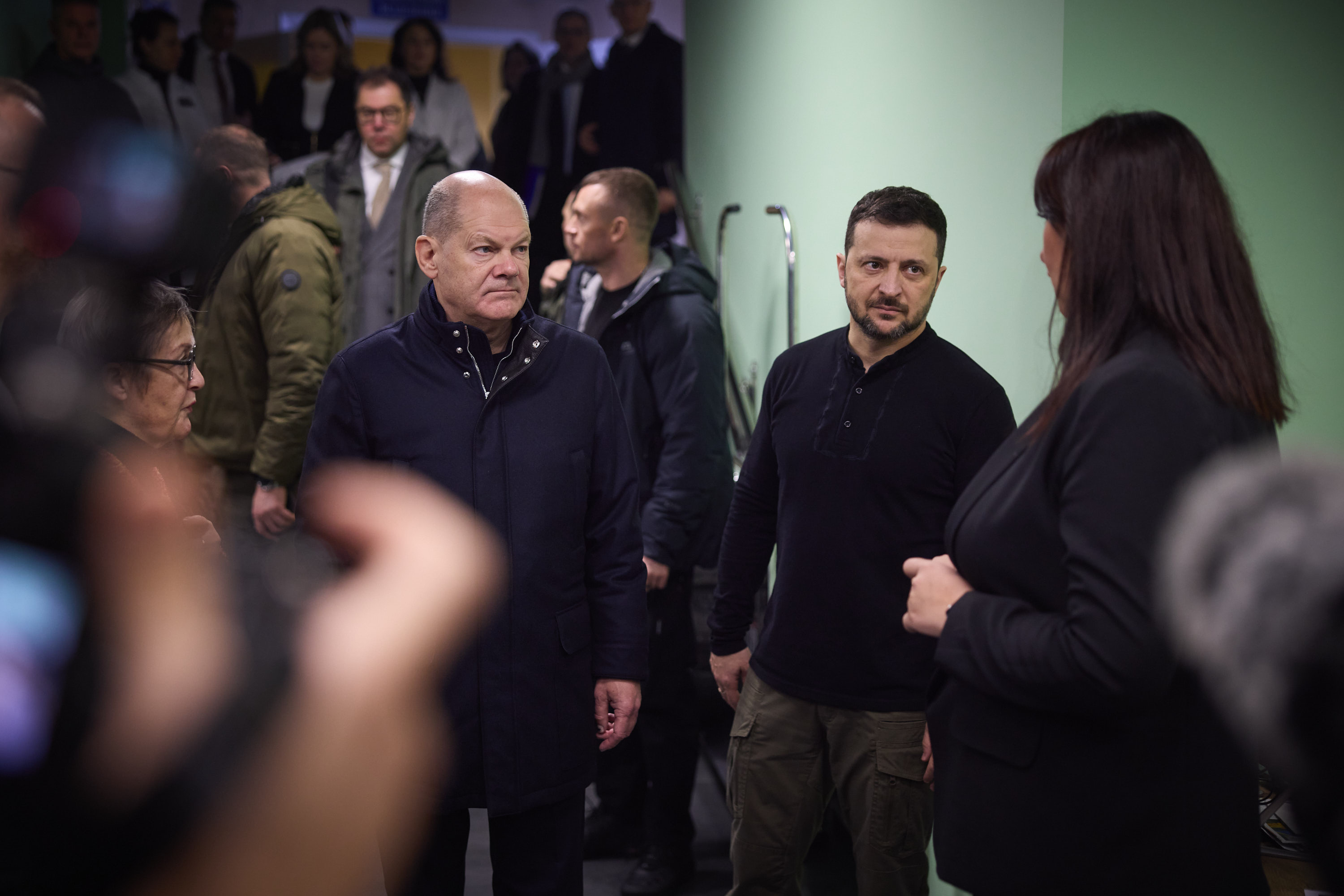
Chancellor Scholz meets with Ukrainian President Volodymyr Zelenskyy in Kyiv, on December 2, 2024.

The disruption of Germany–Russia relations has to do with the paradigm of "Wandel durch Handel" politics. In basic terms, Germany forged a useful economic relationship with Russia through the imports of natural resources under the chancellorship of Gerhard Schröder from 1998 to 2004. Subsequent to the Russia-Ukraine war, this model was abandoned and Germany experienced an economic decline due to strict economic sanctions against the Russian Federation, particularly in the energy sector.

Enacted during the transition between the end of the Scholz cabinet and the beginning of the Merz cabinet, Friedrich Merz announced that all range-based limitations on German weaponry delivered to Ukraine were removed, allowing for Ukraine to use German weaponry for long-range attacks on Russian soil. On 4 October 2026, Merz landed in Kyiv with Economy Minister Katherina Reiche, as Germany is expected to provide Ukraine with €1 billion military aid along with €350 million to repair the country's energy infrastructure.

=== Zelenskyy visits to Germany ===
Zelenskyy's visit to Germany was nearly canceled after leaks online were deemed a potential security threat to the trip. The Berlin newspaper, B.Z., first reported the trip to the city on 4 May, citing the leaked information from a police officer in the Berlin police. The department opened an investigation shortly afterward.

On 14 May, Zelenskyy arrived in Berlin via a Luftwaffe jet departing from Rome. Germany is an important supplier of arms and aid to Ukraine, second in spending only to the United States, but was initially more hesitant to send lethal weaponry. The day prior to Zelenskyy's arrival, Germany announced a new aid package to the country totaling €2.7 billion. Zelenskyy was received by President Frank-Walter Steinmeier, then met with Chancellor Olaf Scholz. During a press conference with Scholz, Zelenskyy praised Germany's new aid package. Scholz meanwhile, in response to a question over Germany being Ukraine's second top backer behind the United States, said that his country was looking to be first in aid.

Zelenskyy and Scholz then flew together to Aachen. Zelenskyy "and the Ukrainian people" were awarded the Charlemagne Prize for their efforts to "support and defend European values." He also met with President of the European Commission Ursula von der Leyen.

== Aid to Ukraine ==
- One mobile field hospital worth €5.3 million and associated training of medical staff in February 2022
- One mobile field hospital in September 2022 in a joint project with Estonia
- Evacuating and treating wounded Ukrainian soldiers in Germany since 2014
- 50 Unimog medical transport vehicles.
- 14 pallets of medical supplies.
- €1.012 million for humanitarian help donated by private citizens in 2022. (The largest sum from individual donations collected for a single cause ever recorded, according to the German National Center for Social Question, DZI)
- 65 refrigerators for medical supplies
- 1200 hospital beds
- €430 million allocated for humanitarian aid (e.g. mine clearing projects) by the Ministry of Foreign Affairs
- €10 million disaster relief
- €185 million by the Ministry for Economic Cooperation and Development to support families displaced within Ukraine
- €200 million package announced by German government to aid Internally displaced persons in Ukraine on 4 September 2022.
- Nine generators provided to the city of Vinnytsia by the Ministry of foreign affairs 27 June 2023.
- One bus converted into a mobile medical practise.
- €20 million in humanitarian aid pledged to help Ukrainian civilians for winter pledged 11 September 2023.
- 20 ambulances donated with the help of the World Health Organization.
- Equipment donated to the Kherson Regional Universal Scientific Library including a braille printer and equipment for the visually impaired set to arrive in spring 2024.
- Federal Agency for Technical Relief delivered five dump trucks, a tractor-trailer and two water tankers and relief supplies worth more than €1.7 million to Kharkiv Oblast on 27 February 2024.
- 20 Toyota landcruisers donated to explosives technicians of the National Police of Ukraine.
- Two Mercedes-Benz Arocs trucks equipped with cranes donated to the Ukrainian Ministry of Energy.
- €10 million for the reconstruction of Okhmatdyt children's hospital and the treatment of child patients in Germany.
- A convoy of eight firefighting vehicles, six water cannons and 15 tonnes of firefighting equipment dispatched by the State Fire Association of Bavaria August 2024.
- Six large generators donated to Ukrainian hospital and water facilities announced 27 September 2024.
- €200 million in humanitarian aid to provide for Ukrainian civilians during winter announced November 2024.
- €2.4 million to support the United Nations Industrial Development Organization's Green industrial recovery programme for Ukraine.
- €806,824,095 funding for the Ukraine Energy Support Fund.
- €2 million in grants to support energy sustainability for Ukrainian small businesses in cooperation with Norway.
- UAH 203.35 million in grants between 700 Ukrainian schools provided by the German Federal Ministry for Economic Cooperation and Development through the German Development Bank
- 20 mobile clinics purchased by Deutsche Gesellschaft für Internationale Zusammenarbeit for six Ukrainian Oblasts with funding from the German government.
- Two Mercedes-Benz Zetros trucks, a mini-excavator and a minibus donated to Zaporizhia Oblast by The German Federal Agency for Technical Assistance
- Two Mercedes-Benz Zetros trucks, a mini-excavator and a minibus donated to Zaporizhia Oblast by The German Federal Agency for Technical Assistance * Nine Volkswagen Amarok pickup trucks donated to Zaporizhia Oblast Regional Administration
- Two backhoe excavators provided to Kharkiv Oblast for infrastructure repair.
- Eight rescue and firefighting vehicles, four specialised cars an ATV and firefighting tools donated to the State Emergency Service by the German Federal Technical Assistance Agency May 2025.
- One air foam fire engine provided to the city of Poltava.
- 12 Mitsubishi pickup trucks and two road rollers donated to Kharkiv Oblast.
- €5 million in funding for The Energy Efficiency Fund for Ukraine.
- €3 million funding for the Food from Ukraine to Syria initiative.
- €40 million in winter humanitarian aid to Ukraine announced November 2025.
- 143 generators to the Ukrainian minister of health co funded with the European Union.
- 33 mobile combined heat and power plants pledged January 2026.
- Three minibuses and 10 pickup trucks donated to Ukrzaliznytsia.
- 76 generators donated to Mykolaiv Oblast.
- 12 Mitsubishi pickup trucks donated to Kherson Oblast emergency and utility services.
- 10 sets of hydraulic rescue equipment for Ukrainian State Emergency Services.
- €50 million funding to restore the Chernobyl New Safe Confinement damaged by Russia.
- €1 additional funding for the International Atomic Energy Agency.
- €5.7 million package for Ukrainian Emergency Services including firefighting robots, vehicles and equipment, busses, minibuses trucks and personal protective equipment.
- Five pickup trucks and five vans provided to Ukrzaliznytsia for infrastructure repair.

== See also ==
- United States and the Russo-Ukrainian war
