= Erbel =

Erbel is a German surname. Notable people with the name include:

- Bernd Erbel (born 1947), German diplomat
- Hermann Erbel (born 1949), known professionally as Herman Rarebell, German musician

== See also ==
- Erbil
