= Rüdiger König =

German diplomat

Permanent Representative of Germany to NATO
- In office August 2020 – August 2023
- Preceded by: Hans-Dieter Lucas
- Succeeded by: Géza Andreas von Geyr

Ambassador of Germany to Afghanistan
- In office August 2010 – September 2013
- Preceded by: Werner Hans Lauk
- Succeeded by: Martin Jäger

Personal details
- Born: Rüdiger König; 8 April 1957 (age 68); Bonn, West Germany

Rüdiger König (born 8 April 1957), is a German diplomat who served as the Permanent Representative of Germany to NATO from 2020 until 2023.

From 2015, he was Head of the Department for Crisis Prevention, Stabilisation, Post-Conflict Rehabilitation and Humanitarian Aid at the Federal Foreign Office.

== Biography ==
Rüdiger König was born in Bonn on 8 April 1957.

After graduating from high school in 1977, König studied political science, constitutional and international law, and sociology at the University of Bonn, graduating with a master's degree.

On 1 April 1986, König entered the Foreign Service. In 1989 his first assignment abroad followed at the Permanent Mission to the United Nations in New York City. After working as a desk officer in the United Nations department at the Federal Foreign Office in Bonn from 1992 to 1996, he worked from 1997 to 1999 as a desk officer for Afghanistan at the Embassy in Islamabad. From 1999 to 2002, König was deputy head of department in the United Nations department at the Federal Foreign Office and in 2001 he was a member of the German delegation at the Petersberg Conference on Afghanistan. From 2002 to 2004 he headed the office of Federal President Johannes Rau in Berlin, as he held the same position for Rau until 2006 after he left office. He then worked until 2008 as Head of the Political Department of the Permanent Mission of Germany to NATO in Brussels. After that, König took over the management of the special staff Afghanistan-Pakistan in the Federal Foreign Office.

From August 2010 to September 2013 he was the successor to Werner Hans Lauk as Ambassador of Germany to Afghanistan and Head of the Embassy of Germany, Kabul. On 12 August 2013, he was awarded the Mir Masjidi Khan Order by Afghan Foreign Minister Zalmay Rassoul. Martin Jäger succeeded König as ambassador to Afghanistan.

After completing his work in Afghanistan, he became the representative for the United Nations and human rights at the Federal Foreign Office's headquarters, and was then crisis officer in the Federal Foreign Office until 2015 and, as Ministerial Director, headed the Department for Crisis Prevention, Stabilization, Post-Conflict Relief and Humanitarian Aid in the Federal Foreign Office from 2015 to 2020.

In August 2020, König became the Permanent Representative of Germany to NATO.

== Family ==
König is married and has a child.
