= List of ambassadors of Germany to Egypt =

The List of German ambassadors in Egypt contains all German ambassadors in Egypt, including their predecessors such as Prussian consuls. The embassy is in the capital Cairo.

== History ==
The Federal Republic of Germany established diplomatic relations with Egypt in 1952. Between May 1965 and June 1972 the embassy was closed and diplomatic relations were broken off. During this time, the Federal Republic had diplomats with the rank of embassy councilor or legation councilor as chargé d'affaires on site. The GDR had a commercial representation from 1953, a consulate general from 1959 and an ambassador in Cairo from 1969.

== Ambassadors ==
Name	Image	Term Start	Term End	Notes
Heinrich Brugsch		1864		Prussian consul in Cairo
Julius von Jasmund		1870	1874	(1827–1879)
Anton Saurma von der Jeltsch	Anton Saurma von der Jeltsch	1878		Consul General
Eduard von Derenthall		1882		Consul General
Otto L. Schmidt-Leda		1885		
Casimir von Leyden			1894	Consul General
Oswald von Richthofen	Oswald von Richthofen	1885	1896	German representative at the public debt administration of Egypt in Cairo (The German Debt Commissioner in Cairo)
Maximilian von Loehr		1894		
Jakob Johannes Schneller		1901	1901	
Theodor Bumiller	Theodor Bumiller	1902		Freiherr von Humboldt headed the consulate in Alexandria
Hartmann von Richthofen	Hartmann von Richthofen	1903	1904	chargé d’Affaires
Johann Heinrich von Bernstorff	Johann Heinrich von Bernstorff	1906	1908	
Hermann von Hatzfeldt-Wildenburg	Hermann von Hatzfeldt-Wildenburg	1908	1912	
Padel von Kulemann		1916		
1923: Re-establishment of a German diplomatic mission in Egypt (the Kingdom of Egypt existed from 1922 to 1952)
Eberhard von Stohrer	Eberhard von Stohrer	1926	1935	
Wernher von Ow-Wachendorf		1936	1939	
1952: Establishment of diplomatic relations between the Federal Republic of Germany and Egypt
Günther Pawelke		1952	1954	
Rudolf Holzhausen		1955	1955	chargé d’affaires
Walther Becker		1955	1959	
Walter Weber		1959	1964	
Georg Federer		1964	1965	
1965: Breaking off diplomatic relations
Horst Hauthal		1965	1966	Legation Councilor 1st Class, chargé d'Affaires
Lothar Lahn		1966	1969	Embassy counselor, chargé d'affaires
Walter Jesser		1969	1972	Envoy; chargé d’Affaires
1972: Resumption of diplomatic relations
Hans-Georg Steltzer		1972	1978	
Wolfgang Behrends		1978	1979	
Hans-Joachim Hille		1979	1982	
Kurt Müller		1982	1986	
Martin Elsässer		1986	1990	
Heinz Fiedler		1990	1993	
Wolf-Dietrich Schilling		1993	1998	
Peter Dingens		1998	2000	
Paul von Maltzahn		2000	2003	
Martin Kobler	Martin Kobler	2003	2006	
Bernd Erbel		2006	2009	
Michael Bock		2009	2014	
Hansjörg Haber		2014	2015	
Julius Georg Luy	Julius Georg Luy	2015	2019	
Cyrill Jean Nunn		2019	2021	
Frank Hartmann		2021	2024	
Jürgen Schulz		2024	Present	

== See also ==
- Egypt–Germany relations
