= List of ambassadors of Germany to Ireland =

German Ambassadors to Ireland

List of German ambassadors in Ireland contains the highest-ranking representatives of the Weimar Republic, Nazi Germany and the Federal Republic of Germany.

== Weimar Republic/Nazi Germany ==
Name	Image	Term Start	Term End	Notes
Georg von Dehn-Schmidt		1923	1934	
Wilhelm von Kuhlmann		1934	1937	Envoy 1st Class
Eduard Hempel		1937	1945	Ambassador, NSDAP member since 1938

== Federal Republic of Germany ==
Name	Image	Term Start	Term End	Notes
Hermann Katzenberger	Hermann Katzenberger	1951	1955	
Felician Prill		1955	1960	
Adolph Reifferscheidt		1960	1963	
Heinz Trützschler von Falkenstein		1963	1967	
Felician Prill		1967	1969	
Karl Overbeck		1969	1972	
Horst Groepper		1972	1973	
Gerhard Fischer		1977	1980	
Carl Lahusen		1980	1983	
Ekkehard Eickhoff		1983	1984	
Horst Grabert	Horst Grabert	1984	1987	
Helmut Rückriegel		1988	1992	
Martin Elsässer		1992	1996	
Horst Pakowski		1996	1999	
Gottfried Haas		2000	2005	
Christian Pauls		2005	2009	
Busso von Alvensleben		2009	2011	
Eckhard Lübkemeier		2011	2014	
Matthias Martin Höpfner		2014	2017	
Deike Potzel		2017	2021	
Cord Meier-Klodt	Cord Meier-Klodt	2021	2024	
David Gill	David Gill	2024	Present	

== See also ==
- German-Irish relations
- Embassy of Germany, Dublin
