= Stephan Steinlein =

German diplomat (born 1961)

- Steinlein in 2017

Ambassador of Germany to France
- Incumbent
- Assumed office 22 September 2023
- President: Frank-Walter Steinmeier
- Preceded by: Hans-Dieter Lucas

Ambassador of Germany to Monaco
- Incumbent
- Assumed office 11 April 2024
- President: Frank-Walter Steinmeier
- Preceded by: Hans-Dieter Lucas

Head of the Federal President Office
- In office 19 March 2017 – 18 March 2022
- President: Frank-Walter Steinmeier
- Preceded by: David Gill
- Succeeded by: Dörte Dinger

State Secretary of the Federal Foreign Office
- In office 23 January 2014 – 27 January 2017 Serving with Markus Ederer
- Preceded by: Emily Haber
- Succeeded by: Walter J. Lindner

Ambassador of East Germany to France
- In office 4 July 1990 – 31 August 1990
- Prime Minister: Lothar de Maizière
- Preceded by: Alfred Marter
- Succeeded by: Office abolished

Personal details
- Born: May 3, 1961 (age 65) Finsterwalde, East Germany
- Party: SPD
- Spouse: Françoise Doussin-Steinlein
- Children: 4
- Education: Evangelisches Sprachenkonvikt

Stephan Steinlein (born 3 May 1961) is a German diplomat and theologian who is currently the ambassador of Germany to France, in service since 2023. He had a brief stint in the East German diplomatic service as its ambassador to France for a few months until it was reunified with West Germany. He joined unified Germany's foreign ministry, where he became a protégé of Frank-Walter Steinmeier. He served as Steinmeier's bureaucratic lieutenant during his time in the chancellery, foreign ministry, and eventually as president. A theologian by education, Steinlein is married and has four children.

== Early life and theological education ==
Steinlein was born on 3 May 1961 in Finsterwalde, part of then East Germany, with three siblings. His father, a Protestant superintendent at his birthplace, was a staunch critic of the East German government. Steinlein and his family moved to Nauen in 1970 following his father's appointment as a superintendent for the locality. Due to his religious background, vocational education was his only way of acquiring the abitur, and as such he became an apprentice at the steel and rolling mill in Hennigsdorf. He became a crane operator for the mill and spent most of his time reading books while working.

Steinlein's father's theological background, as well as refusal to undertake military service, barred him from attending state colleges. Following his father's footsteps in theology, Steinlein opted for the Evangelisches Sprachenkonvikt, a theological high school in East Berlin. He studied there from 1980 to 1987. Theological institutions were the few places which retained independence from political obedience to the regime. Steinlein and his colleagues discussed about democracy and the future of East Germany after the fall of the Berlin Wall. Steinlein also met with future party comrades Markus Meckel, Martin Gutzeit, Hans Misselwitz, and Richard Schröder and maintained relations with the Polish Solidarity trade union.

After undergoing practical ecclesiastical training for two years from 1987, in 1989 he was ordained as vicar. He then pursued his doctorate under the supervision of Wolfgang Ullmann, who would go on to become a non-portfolio minister in East Germany's last cabinet. Ullmann helped him to secure a scholarship from the World Council of Churches to pursue a master's degree in Strasbourg. Steinlein learned French in Strasbourg and met Françoise Doussin, who became his wife.

== Diplomatic and government career ==
=== Ambassador of East Germany to France ===
Steinlein's identity card as an East German diplomat, 1990

Steinlein was in Strasbourg when news of the Fall of the Berlin Wall came about. He returned to East Germany following the 1990 East German general election, and went to the foreign ministry to find a job for his partner. There, Steinlein met with his classmate Hans Misselwitz, who had become the ministry's state secretary—second-in-command—and instead of a job offer for his wife, he himself was offered a post as ambassador to France. At the same time, his doctoral advisor Wolfgang Ullman offered him to manage his parliamentary office. He accepted the ambassadorial offer after he and Françoise went for a walk on Lützowstraße. Steinlein, who was chosen for the post over two other theologian candidates, believed that his fluent French and the trust he built with the foreign ministry's new leadership secured his selection. Before departing for France, Steinlein was given his own office in the foreign ministry headquarters and had a dinner with the French ambassador.

Official letter conferring Steinlein the diplomatic rank of ambassador extraordinary and plenipotentiary, signed by Sabine Bergmann-Pohl as East Germany's head of state on 18 July 1990.

Steinlein was appointed on 13 June 1990, and his appointment was approved by the French government on 4 July 1990. Being only 29 years old, Steinlein described himself as "a complete greenhorn in diplomacy" at the time of his appointment. He ran the embassy with skeleton staff, as most of the embassy's staff at that time were already recruited by international institutions based in Paris. Steinlein's main objective as ambassador was to oversee the embassy's eventual closure, which was to be done in conjunction with the reunification treaty. Steinlein sifted through East Germany's assets in Germany, including intangible ones such as sister cities and commercial chambers, and decided which ones to be preserved and brought into unified Germany. He also dismissed political officers who were identified as Stasi agents infiltrating the embassy's system.

Steinlein was planned to have presented his letters of credence to president François Mitterrand in September, but due to the brevity of his tenure he never presented his credentials; as such, he never had the chance to meet any French officials. He called upon the chargé d'affaires of the West German embassy, Otto Raban Heinichen, where the two discussed possibilities of cooperation in light of the incoming unification process. Heinichen described Steinlein from the encounter as having a "youthful but intelligent, mentally agile, and deeply committed" persona. Steinlein eventually met with ambassador Franz Pfeffer, who had just returned from leave, on 28 August and informed him that he had just received his letter of recall on the same day, which took effect on 31 August. Steinlein's then expressed interest in continuing his diplomatic career, to which Pfeffer recommended him to apply for attaché training (Attachéausbildung) in the German Federal Foreign Office.

=== Steinmeier's confidant ===
Steinlein was admitted as part of the 46th cohort of the foreign office's training program and its first from unified Germany. Upon completing his two-year diplomatic training in 1993, he worked in the Central and Eastern Europe department of the office for a year before being posted to the embassy in Warsaw as a press officer. Returning from Warsaw in 1997, he was appointed to the same job for the federal foreign office and was one of its spokesperson.

Following the appointment of Frank-Walter Steinmeier as Head of the Federal Chancellery of Germany, Steinlein was appointed as his press secretary on the recommendation of a Der Spiegel journalist. Steinlein remained in proximity with Steinmeier for the next two decade as his protégé. He became Steinmeier's chief of staff by 2002 and retained the position when Steinmeier was named as foreign minister in 2005. (Note: His official title as Steinmeier's chief of staff in the foreign office was Head of the Executive Staff and Head of the Minister's Office (Leiter des Leitungsstabes und Leiter des Ministerbüros).) Steinlein joined the Social Democratic Party (SDP) in 2003, amidst the mass defection shortly after Chancellor Gerhard Schröder introduced the Agenda 2010.

After spokesperson to chancellor Angela Merkel Thomas Steg temporarily left his duties from mid-July 2009 up until the elections in September, Steinlein was nominated as his provisional replacement, but was rejected by Merkel. Steinmeier became the Social Democratic Party's parliamentary leader after it was defeated in the elections, and Steinlein was entrusted to manage his office. In an article published around the time of the election, Hajo Schumacher of the Berliner Morgenpost described Steinlein as "the phantom" within Steinmeier's inner circle. Daniel Friedrich Sturm, writing for Die Welt, argued that Steinlein was too similar in character with Steinmeier due to his diplomatic background, and that Steinmeier needs a rowdy partner that could "balance his strengths and weaknesses".

Steinlein (second from left) accompanying Steinmeier during his meeting with Ukrainian politician Vitali Klitschko, 2014

Steinmeier became the foreign minister following the 2013 elections and appointed Steinlein as one of the two state secretaries (staatssekretär) in the Foreign Office, officially assuming duties on 23 January 2014. Daniel Friedrich Sturm stated that Steinlein garnered "an excellent reputation" in the Foreign Office as a "professional, reliable technocrat". After several German state officials were revealed spying for the United States early in his term, Steinlein summoned the U.S. ambassador in Germany John B. Emerson and urged him to clear up the case immediately. He also played a background role in implementing Agenda 2010, the deployment of the Bundeswehr in Afghanistan, and reviewing the Foreign Office's reform.

Steinmeier was selected by the governing parties CDU/CSU and the Social Democratic Party—two biggest parties in German's Federal Convention that would elect its president—as its candidate in the 2017 presidential election. With the move being tantamount to election, Stephan Steinlein's name had already circulated in January as the state secretary of the Office of the Federal President (Bundespräsidialamt), responsible for managing Steinmeier's office. By 25 that month, Steinmeier handed over his leadership of the Foreign Office to Sigmar Gabriel, while Steinlein became the outgoing state secretary, with the-then ambassador to South Africa Walter J. Lindner as his successor in waiting. After Steinmeier was elected by the federal convention as president in a landslide victory in February, Steinmeier was sworn in on 19 March 2017 and Steinlein took leadership of the federal president's office on the same day with an official letter of appointment (ernennungsurkunde). Steinlein is responsible for, among others, setting up priorities for Steinmeier's presidency. Steinlein was awarded the officer class of France's Legion of Honour by secretary of state Clément Beaune during his visit to Berlin in January 2022, and by March 2022 was replaced by head of Steinmeier's personal office Dörte Dinger.

After almost two decades of service as Steinmeier's aide, Steinmeier moved to Switzerland, where he worked as a researcher in residence at the University of St. Gallen and advised the International Committee of the Red Cross in Geneva on diplomatic matters.

=== Ambassador of Germany to France ===
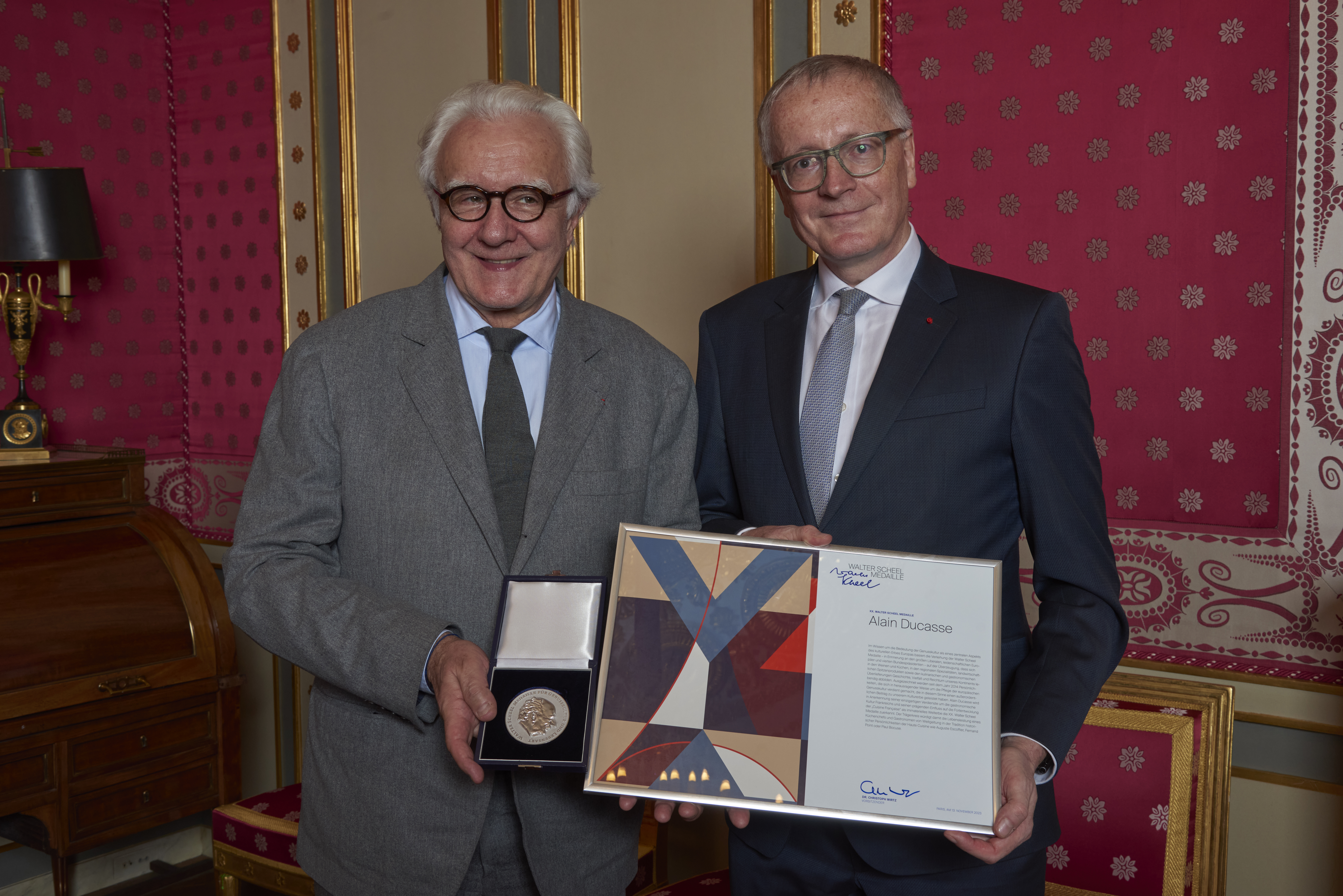
Stephan Steinlein with Alain Ducasse at the Hôtel Beauharnais, 2023

In April 2023, Steinlein was nominated by Steinmeier as ambassador to France. He was formally announced for the post in late July 2023, replacing Hans-Dieter Lucas who was reassigned as ambassador to Italy. He officially took up his post on 7 August, becoming the only person to become an ambassador in both East Germany and Germany. He presented his credentials to President of France Emmanuel Macron on 22 September 2023. Steinlein, who is also accredited to Monaco, presented his credentials to Prince Albert II on 11 April 2024.

== Personal life ==
Married to Françoise Doussin, Steinlein shared a family of four children, three of whom he fathered. During Steinlein's diplomatic stint, Doussin taught French for diplomats in the Foreign Office.
