= Hermann von Richthofen =

German diplomat (1933–2021)

Hermann Manfred Georg Freiherr von Richthofen, GCVO (20 November 1933 in Breslau – 17 July 2021 in Berlin) was a German diplomat. He was a great nephew of Manfred von Richthofen, the "Red Baron".

He was ambassador to the United Kingdom from 1989 to 1993, and his name and relation to the World War I fighter pilot Baron Manfred von Richthofen made him a media favourite. He was later permanent representative of Germany to NATO from 1993 to 1998.

Hermann von Richthofen was married and had three children with his wife.

Hermann Freiherr von Richthofen was awarded an honorary LLD by Birmingham University in 2000.

== Career history ==
- 1955-58: Studied law at the Universities in Heidelberg, Munich and Bonn
- 1958: First law degree
- 1963: Second law degree
- 1963: Dr. Jur. (PhD Law). Joined German diplomatic service on graduation
- 1965-66: Federal German Foreign Office Desk Officer in Legal Directorate-General
- 1966-68: Embassy Saigon Desk Officer for Humanitarian Aid
- 1968-70: Embassy Jakarta Labour Attaché and Desk Officer in Legal and Consular Section and Political Section
- 1970-74: Federal Foreign Office Desk Officer in Legal Directorate-General
- 1974: Deputy Head of Section for International Law
- 1975-78: Federal Chancellery Head of Section in Political Department of the Permanent Mission of the Federal Republic of Germany in Berlin (East)
- 1978-80: Federal Foreign Office Head of Department in Political Directorate-General
- 1980-86: Federal Chancellery Head of Working Unit "Deutschland-Politik"
- 1986: Federal Foreign Office Deputy Under Secretary, Director-General for Legal Affairs and Special Adviser on International Law
- 1986-1988: Federal Foreign Office Deputy Under Secretary (Political Director)
- 1989-1993: Ambassador of the Federal Republic of Germany to the Court of St. James's
- 1993-1998: permanent representative of Germany to NATO, Brussels
