= Emil Wiehl =

German diplomat

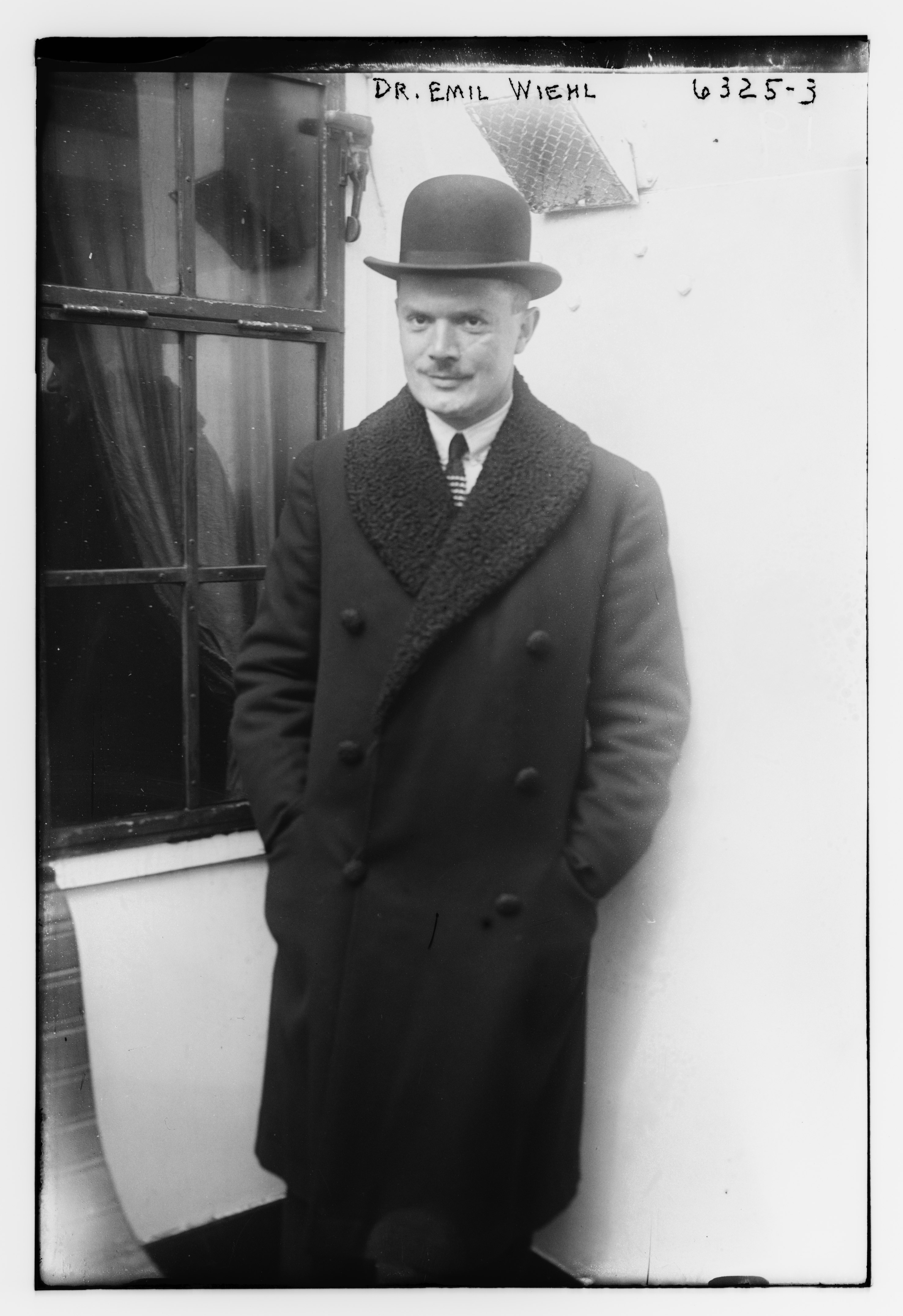
- Photograph of Wiehl

German Ambassador to South Africa
- In office 1933–1937
- Preceded by: Friedrich Wilhelm von Keßler
- Succeeded by: Rudolf Leitner

Personal details
- Born: Emil Karl Joseph Wiehl; 22 February 1886; Walldürn
- Died: 9 November 1960 (aged 74); Campo Grande, Lisbon
- Education: University of Heidelberg, University of Berlin, University of Freiburg
- Awards: Order of the Lion of Finland

Emil Karl Joseph Wiehl (22 February 1886 – 9 November 1960) was a German diplomat.

== Early life ==
Wiehl was born on 22 February 1886 in Walldürn, a town in the Neckar-Odenwald district, in Baden-Württemberg, Germany. He was the son of a presiding judge at a regional court.

After graduating from high school in Karlsruhe, Wiehl studied law at the Universities of Heidelberg, Berlin and Freiburg. In 1906 he became a member of the Corps Suevia in Heidelberg.

== Career ==
After completing his studies, he entered the Baden judicial service, initially as a legal trainee and, from 1913, as a court assessor. He served in World War I as a reserve Lieutenant in Field Artillery Regiment No. 51. He received the Iron Cross, 2nd and 1st Class, as well as the Wound Badge (in silver). After the end of the war, he returned to the Baden judicial service as a public prosecutor in Konstanz.

=== Diplomatic service ===
In 1920, Wiehl moved to the Foreign Service. From 1921 to 1922, he was legation secretary at the Embassy of Germany, London. From 1925 to 1927, he worked as a legation councilor at the Embassy of Germany, Washington, D.C. From 1927 to 1928, he was German Consul General in San Francisco. In 1928, he returned to the Foreign Office in Berlin, where he was appointed Legation Councilor in 1929. From 1933 to 1937, he was Consul General and chargé d'affaires in Pretoria. On April 1, 1934, he joined the NSDAP.

From 1937 to 1944, he was Ministerial Director in Berlin, and head of the Trade Policy department. In this role, he negotiated a trade deal with Soviet Russia.

In April 1945, Wiehl fled to Switzerland and, from there, to Argentina in 1949. In March 1952, he returned to Germany. From September 1956 until his death, he was based in Lisbon.

== Personal life ==
Wiehl died on 9 November 1960 at Campo Grande in Lisbon.
