= Christian Pauls =

German diplomat

Christian Pauls (born 26 September 1944, Buckow, Brandenburg, Germany) is a retired German diplomat.

== Early life ==
After studying law at the Universities of Freiburg, Hamburg and Montpellier from 1973 to 1975, he worked as a lawyer in Hamburg.

== Career ==
Pauls joined the Foreign Service in 1975 and then served at the German Foreign Office in Bonn and at the embassies of the Federal Republic of Germany in Greece, India, Italy and the United States, where he coincidentally had gone to middle school (Hardy Middle School, Georgetown, Washington DC) when his father, Rolf Friedemann Pauls, was the Ambassador of the Federal Republic of Germany to the United States.

From 1996 to 1999 Christian Pauls was head of a special staff at the Kosovo mission, then head of a subdivision in the Political Department of the German Foreign Office. From 2001 to 2005 Christian Pauls was Ambassador of the Federal Republic of Germany to Canada. His successor was Matthias Martin Höpfner.

Thereafter, he was Ambassador of the Federal Republic of Germany to Ireland. On 13 September 2007, Ambassador Pauls made a brief speech in German to a visiting group from the German Federation of Buying and Marketing Groups (the ZGV) at Clontarf Castle in Dublin. in which the Irish Independent quoted him as saying that:

- Ireland was a "coarse place".
- Irish junior ministers earned more than the German Chancellor.
- 20% of the population were public servants.
- Ireland's "chaotic" hospital waiting lists would not be tolerated elsewhere.
- Irish wage demands, particularly those in the health services, were too high.
- Ireland's immigration policy had learned nothing from Germany and the Nordic countries.

Irish MEP Gay Mitchell was present at the meeting and Ambassador Pauls' remarks became known to the Irish media. The press coverage resulted in a rebuke from Dermot Gallagher, the Secretary General of the Irish Department of Foreign Affairs.

Mr. Pauls later claimed that parts of his speech to the ZGV group were mistranslated. Following this post in 2009, he went into retirement.

In subsequent years, Irish commentators remarked that the Ambassador's remarks were vindicated.
