= List of ambassadors of Germany to Afghanistan =

The following is a partial list of German ambassadors to Afghanistan.

== Unified Germany (1870–1945) ==
- Werner Otto von Hentig, 1916–1917 (legation leader)
- Fritz Grobba, from 1923 to 1926
- August Friedrich Feigel, 1926–1929
- Leopold von Plessen, 1929
- Heribert Otto Paul Schwörbel, 1931–1933
- Kurt Max Paul Ziemke, 1933–1936
- Hans Pilger, 1937–1945

== East Germany (1945–1990) ==
The German Democratic Republic first sent an ambassador to Kabul 17 January 1973. The German Democratic ceased to exist in 1990, however.

- Ferdinand Thun, 1973–1976
- Klaus Wolf, 1976–1978
- Kraft Bumbel, 1979–1981
- Kurt Krüger, 1982–1986
- Kraft Bumbel, 1986–1989
- Horst Lindner, 1989–1990

== West Germany (1945–1990) ==
- Franz Quiring, 1954–1956
- Erich Eiswaldt, 1957–1959
- Hans Schmidt-Horix, 1959–1963
- Gerhard Moltmann, 1963–1969
- Richard Breuer, 1969–1973
- Franz Josef Hoffmann, 1973–1979
- Karl-Heinrich Berninger, 1979–1982

== Unified Germany (1990–2021) ==
- Rainer Eberle, 2001–2004
- Rainald Steck, 2004–2006
- Hans-Ulrich Seidt, 2006–2008
- Werner Hans Lauk, 2008–2010
- Rüdiger König, 2010–2013
- Martin Jäger, 2013–2014
- Markus Potzel, 2014–2016
- Walter Haßmann, 2016–2018
- Peter Prügel, 2018–2020
- Axel Zeidler, 2020–2021
