= David Gill (civil servant) =

German civil servant and politician

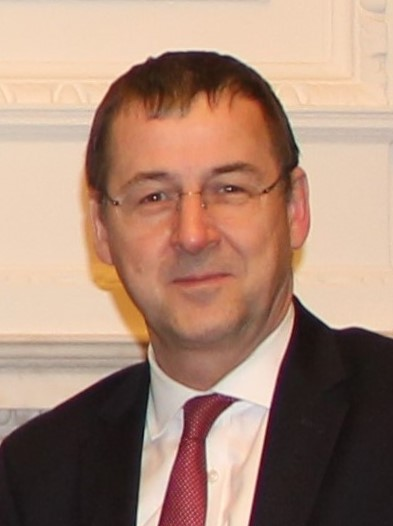
- Gill in 2024

German Ambassador to Ireland
- Incumbent
- Assumed office August 2024
- President: Frank-Walter Steinmeier
- Preceded by: Cord Meier-Klodt

Consul General in New York
- In office 2017–2024
- Succeeded by: Till Knorn

Parliamentary State Secretary and Head of the Office of the Federal President
- In office 2012–2017
- President: Joachim Gauck

Personal details
- Born: March 2, 1966 (age 60) Schönebeck, Germany
- Party: Social Democratic
- Spouse: Sheila Gill
- Education: Freie Universität Berlin, University of Pennsylvania (LL.M)
- Awards: Theodor Heuss Medal

David Gill (born 1966) is a German civil servant and politician, serving as the German Ambassador to Ireland since August 2024. He previously served as German Consul General in New York and he had been Secretary of State and head of the Bundespräsidialamt, the administration of the President of Germany. He was appointed on 19 March 2012 by President Joachim Gauck and stayed in office until February 2017. He is a member of the Social Democratic Party of Germany.

== Career ==
He grew up in East Germany, where he initially studied theology, the only subject he was allowed to study. After the German reunification, he worked for the Federal Commissioner for the Stasi Records and became a close aide of Joachim Gauck, serving as his press secretary. In 1991, he was one of six individuals, one of them also being Gauck, who were awarded the Theodor Heuss medal by the Theodor Heuss Foundation, on behalf of the peaceful protesters of 1989 in then-East Germany.

In 1992, he left the Federal Commissioner's office to study law, and earned an LL.M. at the University of Pennsylvania in 1998. In 2000, he passed the second state examination, qualifying as a lawyer. He then worked as an adviser to the Federal Ministry of the Interior. From 2004, he worked for the Evangelical Church in Germany.

Following Gauck's nomination for President of Germany, Gill became head of his transition team and the designated head of the Bundespräsidialamt. Gill was head of the Bundespräsidialamt, in the rank of state secretary, until the end of Gauck's tenure in February 2017. His successor was Stephan Steinlein.

== Personal life ==
He is married to Sheila Shrivastava, an American. They have two daughters.

== Publications ==
- (with Ulrich Schröter): Das Ministerium für Staatssicherheit: Anatomie des Mielke-Imperiums. Berlin: Rowohlt 1991 ISBN 3-87134-017-0; Taschenbuch (rororo 9369) 1993 ISBN 3-499-19369-8
- Best Practice - Bericht aus der Praxis eines Informationsbeauftragten, in: Bettina Sokol (Hrsg.): Sommersymposium Informationsfreiheit Düsseldorf 2004, S. 51-69 Volltext

== Weblink ==
David Gill's CV on the website of the German Missions in the United States
