= Anka Feldhusen =

German diplomat

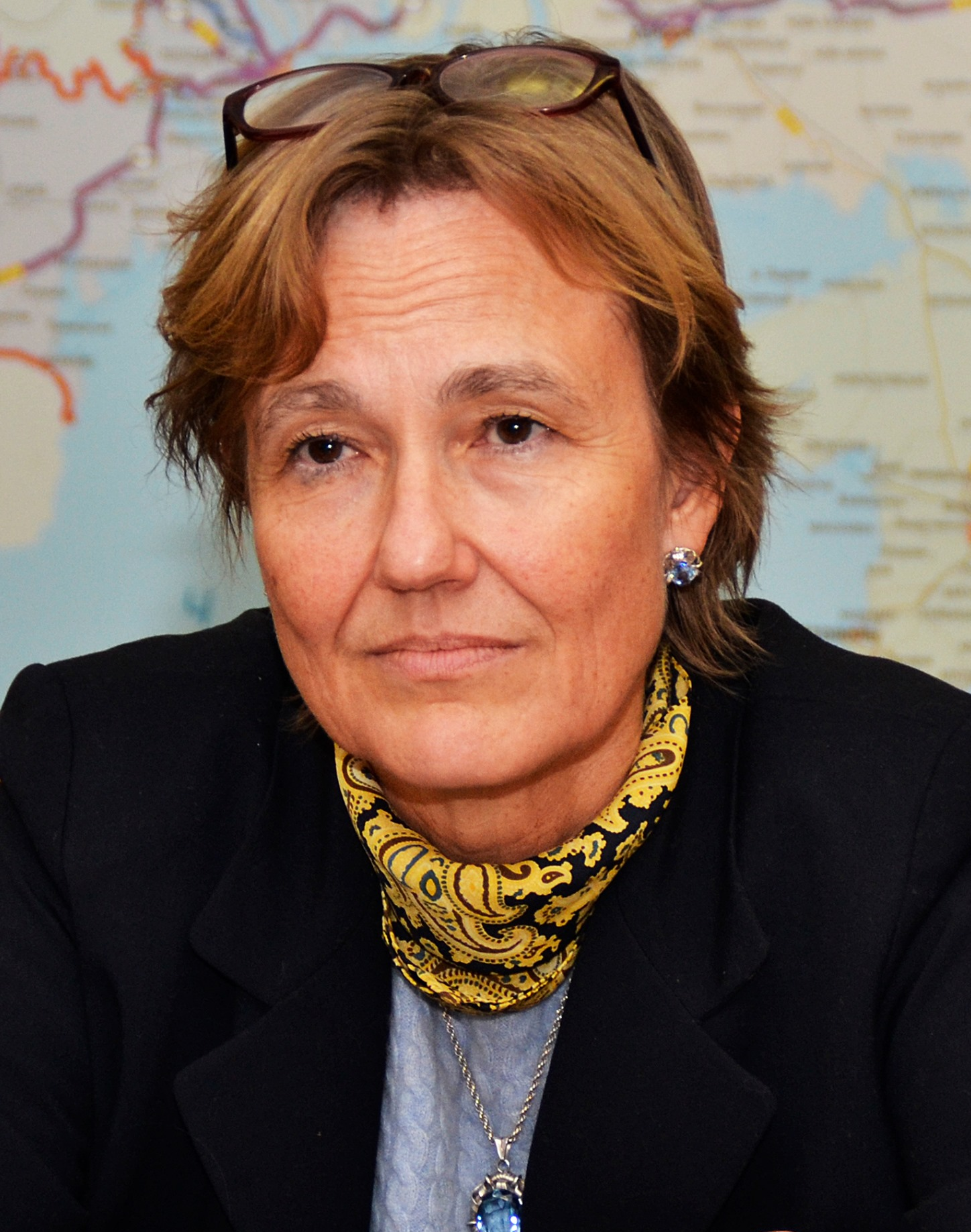

Ambassador of the Federal Republic of Germany in Kyiv
- Incumbent
- Assumed office 24 July 2019
- Preceded by: Ernst Reichel

Personal details
- Born: 25 April 1966 (age 60) Elmshorn, Germany
- Education: University of Kiel; Fletcher School of Law and Diplomacy

Anka Feldhusen (born 1966) is a German diplomat. Since July 2019 she is Ambassador of the Federal Republic of Germany in Kyiv, Ukraine.

== Life ==
Anka Feldhusen graduated from the Kiel School of Applied Sciences in 1985 and subsequently studied Political Science, Slavistics and English at the Christian-Albrechts-Universität Kiel (1985-1987) and at the Institut d'Etudes Politiques in Paris (1987-1990) received her diploma. Was she followed by a course for the higher foreign service at the training center of the Foreign Office in Bonn (1993-1994).

From 1994 to 1997 she was press and protocol officer of the German Embassy Kyiv. She completed a master's degree in International Relations at the Fletcher School of Law and Diplomacy in Medford (1997-1998).

From 1998 to 2001 she was protocol officer of the Foreign Office in Bonn and Berlin. During this time, she headed the office of the Foreign Office in Prizren for two months in 2000. She was then a member of the EU Coordinating Staff at the Federal Foreign Office Berlin (2001-2002), Deputy Head of the German Embassy in Havana (2002-2005), Head of the Federal Foreign Office Berlin (2005-2009), Deputy Head of the German Embassy in Kyiv (2009-2015), Head of Unit East Africa of the Federal Foreign Office Berlin (2015-2016) and Head of Division of the Department of Foreign Affairs of the Federal President's Office Berlin (2016-2019). Since July 2019 she is Ambassador of the Federal Republic of Germany in Kyiv.

According to Ukrainian high-rank officials, she is one of the most effective ambassadors of Germany to Ukraine.

Diplomatic posts
Preceded by Ernst Reichel	German Ambassador to Ukraine; 2019-	Succeeded by —
