= Kurt Krüger (diplomat) =

- Born: Kurt Hermann Ernst Paul Krüger; 17 September 1925; Jüterbog, Brandenburg, Germany
- Died: 21 October 2006 (aged 81); Berlin, Germany
- Occupations: Politician; Diplomat
- Political party: SED

Kurt Hermann Ernst Paul Krüger (17 September 1925 – 21 October 2006) was an East German politician and diplomat whose career was crowned with an appointment, in 1982, as his country's ambassador to Kabul.

== Life ==
=== Early years ===
Krüger was born in Jüterbog, a traditionally walled town some 40 miles (65 km) south-west of Berlin. His father worked as a waiter and his mother was employed in retailing. His own schooling came to an accelerated conclusion through the device of an "Emergency Abitur" due to the pressures arising out of war and he was conscripted for Labour service early in 1943.

=== Army life in the Soviet Union ===
In June 1943 he was drafted into the army, serving initially in Poland before being transferred to the Russian Front in June 1944. By September 1944 he had been promoted to the rank of sub-officer. That was the month in which he defected to the Red Army and almost immediately joined the Soviet backed National Committee for a Free Germany (NKFD / Nationalkomitee Freies Deutschland). He then undertook propaganda missions on behalf of the NKFD with the troops still fighting. From December 1944, in Soviet captivity, he undertook numerous assignments for the NKFD in the prisoner camps. From 1948 he was employed as a production manager in Camp 7351/6. He also attended an Anti-Fascist School in Tagil (near Moscow).

=== East Germany ===
When, in October 1949, he returned to what remained of Germany, Krüger found his home region in the Soviet occupation zone, which was by now being transformed into a separate German state called the German Democratic Republic (East Germany). His first job involved the registration of returning prisoners of war at the Gronenfelde Returnees Camp near Frankfurt (Oder). He then worked as a construction engineer/soil mechanic back in his birth town, with the Jüterbog Building Union. In 1950 he was appointed Officer for Youth Protection with the regional council for nearby Luckenwalde.

In 1950 he joined both the Free German Youth (FDJ / (Freie Deutsche Jugend) and the country's recently formed ruling Socialist Unity Party (SED / Sozialistische Einheitspartei Deutschlands), becoming a full-time party official with the SED. In 1950/51 he worked as the Luckenwalde district head of Agitation. Then between April and August 1951 he undertook an illegal mission in West Germany, and involving the Unemployment agency, on behalf of the party central committee. In September 1951 he became Second Secretary of the party's regional leadership in Luckenwalde, and in 1952 he undertook a period of study at the "Ernst Thälmann [regional party] Academy" at Schmerwitz (Wiesenburg). Between 1954 and 1957 he combined his professional duties with a correspondence study course at the party's Karl Marx Academy in Berlin.

In 1953 he joined East Germany's quasi-military police service. Between 1953 and 1962 he was employed an instructor and department head for the Interior Ministry in the "M" division and in the Security Issues Department of The Party Central Committee, with responsibility for setting up battle groups. He next took over, between 1962 and 1972, as a police colonel and with regional responsibility for the police in Frankfurt (Oder). Between 1963 and 1972 he sat as a member of the local district assembly, serving as chairman of its Standing Commission for Order and Security. In 1967 he became a member of The Party Regional Leadership Team for Frankfurt (Oder). During this time, in 1966/67, he also underwent a succession of Interior Ministry leadership courses at the National Police Academy in Berlin.

In 1972 he joined the International Relations Department of The Party Central Committee, also becoming deputy general secretary of the national Afro-Asian Solidarity Committee. Between 1974 and March 1982 he then served as general secretary of the committee, a position he surrendered before becoming, in April 1982, the German Democratic Republic's Ambassador to Afghanistan, a posting he was to retain for a little more than four years.

Kurt Krüger retired from public service in 1988.

== Awards and honours ==
- 1975 Patriotic Order of Merit in Silver
- 1986 Forty Years of Victory in the Great Patriotic War Medal from the Soviet Union
