= List of ambassadors of Germany to New Zealand =

The list of German ambassadors to New Zealand includes the ambassadors of the Federal Republic of Germany to New Zealand.

== History ==
German-New Zealand relations began with the establishment of the embassy in 1953. In 1964 the embassy was rededicated as an embassy. The German ambassador in Wellington is also accredited for the Cook Islands, Kiribati, Niue, Samoa, Tonga and Tuvalu.

== Ambassadors ==
Name	Image	Term Start	Term End	Notes
Erich Boltze	Erich Boltze	1953	1956	Envoy
Herbert Conrad Nöhring		1957	1965	Envoy
Heinrich Köhler		1965	1968	
Kurt Luedde-Neurath	Kurt Luedde-Neurath (1958)	1968	1970	
Eckard Briest		1970	1974	
Otto Soltmann		1974	1978	
Karl Döring		1978	1979	
Hans Alfred Steger		1980	1985	
Horst Becker		1985	1989	
Gerhard Weber		1989	1995	
Eberhard Nöldeke		1995	2000	
Guido Heymer		2000	2002	
Erich Riedler		2002	2005	
Jörg Zimmermann		2005	2009	
Thomas Hermann Meister	Thomas Hermann Meister	2009	2012	
Anne-Marie Schleich		2012	2016	
Gerhard Thiedemann		2016	2019	
Stefan Krawielicki		2019	2022	
Michael Feiner		2022		Chargé d’affaires
Nicole Menzenbach		2022	Present	

== See also ==
- Germany–New Zealand relations
