= Katrin Adt =

German business executive (born 1972)

- Born: 8 May 1972 (age 54); Bonn, West Germany
- Occupation: Business executive
- Known for: CEO of Smart; Mercedes-Benz Group executive
- Children: 2

Katrin Adt (born 8 May 1972) is a German business executive who is the CEO of Automobile Dacia. She has served as the head of the newly created division Mercedes-Benz Cars Own Retail Europe (cars and vans) at Mercedes-Benz Group from July 2019 to May 2023 and previously CEO of the Smart car division from 2018 to 2020.

On September 1, 2025, she was appointed CEO of the Dacia Brand, and member of the Leadership team of Renault Group.

== Early life and education ==
Adt was born in 1972 as the daughter of diplomat Harro Adt. She grew up in Afghanistan, India, Switzerland, the Central African Republic and France. After graduating in 1991, she studied law in Göttingen and Coimbra. She completed her legal traineeship at the Higher Regional Court in Celle as well as in Frankfurt and Brussels.

== Career ==
In 1999, Adt started her career at Daimler AG as assistant to the then director of DaimlerChrysler in Belgium and Luxembourg, Annette Winkler (later her predecessor at smart). From 2002 to 2006, she was responsible for the dealer network development of the Daimler Group in Belgium and Luxembourg, before moving to the corporate headquarters in Stuttgart in 2006. There, she was given responsibility for the Group's global sales network strategy. During this time, she was responsible among other things, the demerger of the worldwide distribution networks of Daimler and Chrysler, after the alliance had ended in 2007 with the sale of Chrysler. From 2009, she led a project for the worldwide realignment of Mercedes-Benz sales.

From 2010 to 2013, Adt was the CEO of Mercedes-Benz Luxembourg and, with an organization of around 550 employees, was responsible for the wholesale, retail and service of Mercedes-Benz passenger cars, commercial vehicles and buses.

In 2013, she moved to Stuttgart to join Egon Zehnder before returning to Daimler in 2014 as Vice President HR Development & HR Services. She was responsible for the management of the Group's top management level, personnel development and management training, the expatriate management of Daimler AG and the nationwide HR shared service organization. In this role, Adt developed and was responsible for the company-wide transformation program "Leadership 2020", with which Daimler is developing a new leadership culture, strengthening a flexible and innovative organization and thus aligning itself for the future.

In June 2018, Daimler announced that Adt would take over the management of the smart product division from Winkler. Adt has been managing smart since September of the same year. There, she mainly designed the conversion of the car manufacturer to the supplier of exclusively electric cars.

In May 2019, Adt shifted positions to run Mercedes-Benz's wholly owned and operated dealerships in Europe, reporting to Britta Seeger who is Daimer's board member for sales and marketing. Daimer has announced that Adt's role will be focused on "shaping a long-term future for the brand, which was secured by founding a joint venture with Geely in China". In 2019, Adt was appointed as the new head of the smart product area at Daimer AG.

In September 2025, Adt joins the Renault Group, where she is named CEO of the Dacia Brand, reporting to Chief Growth Officer Fabrice Cambolive. She is also a member of the Group's Leadership Team.

== Mandates and memberships ==
- Member of the Supervisory Board of Daimler Mobility AG
- Member of Generation CEO
- Participant in the 138th Baden-Baden business talks

== Personal life ==
Adt is married and has two children.

== See also ==
- Automobile Dacia
- Smart
