= Harro Adt =

German diplomat

Ambassador of West Germany to the Central African Republic
- In office 1984–1986
- Preceded by: Otto Roever
- Succeeded by: Otfried Garbe

Ambassador of Germany to Mali
- In office 1994–1997
- Preceded by: Hans-Henning Bruhn
- Succeeded by: Karl Prinz

Ambassador of Germany to South Africa
- In office 2004–2007
- Preceded by: Anna-Margareta Peters
- Succeeded by: Dieter W. Haller

Personal details
- Born: 20 May 1942 (age 83) Munich, Germany

Harro Adt (born 20 May 1942) is a German diplomat.

== Life and career ==
Adt studied law in Tübingen, Munich, and Freiburg; He passed his first state examination in 1969. In 1972 he passed the second state examination and then went into foreign service.

Adt was accredited in Kabul, Calcutta, Geneva, Paris, and Brussels. In 2003, he was Ministerial Director of Monsieur Afrique in the government of Gerhard Schröder. He was later appointed ambassador to South Africa and then the Federal Government's Africa Commissioner.

After serving as the ambassador to Mali, he traveled again to the Malian capital Bamako on 22 July 2003, together with the then State Secretary Jürgen Chrobog, in order to work with the Malian government to find a solution to the hostage-taking in the Sahara.

Adt is the father of the German business executive Katrin Adt.
