= Gudrun Masloch =

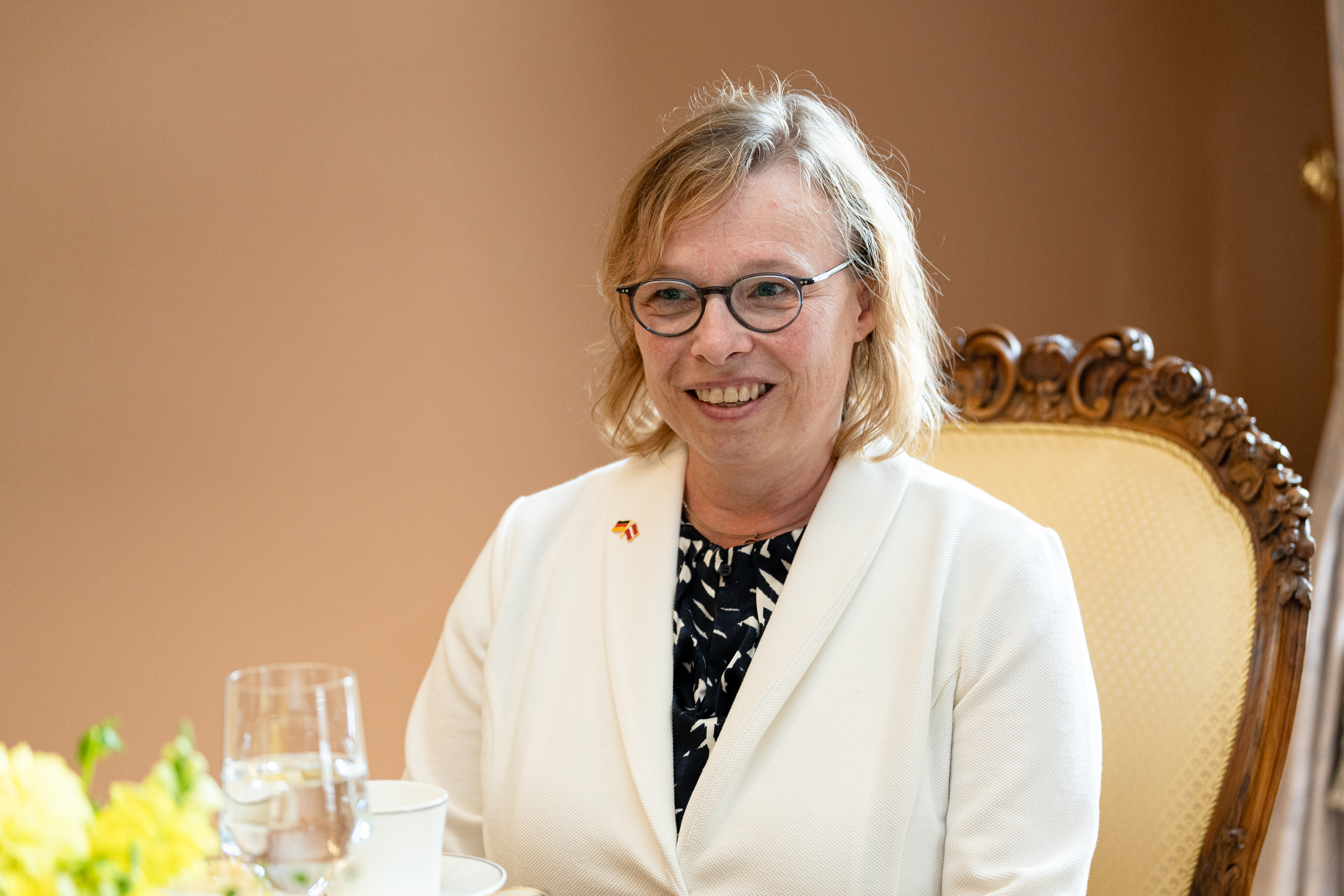
- Born: 1969 (age 56–57)
- Education: Fordham University
- Known for: Ambassador to Latvia
- Predecessor: Christian Heldt

Gudrun Masloch (born 1969) became the German ambassador to Latvia in 2024.

== Life ==
Masloch was born in 1969. Masloch's first degree is in public administration and she also has an MBA which she obtained from Fordham University in New York.

Masloch was chosen as the new German ambassador to Latvia in 2024. She presented her credentials to the Latvian President Edgars Rinkēvičs on 13 August as the Ambassador Extraordinary and Plenipotentiary of the Federal Republic of Germany to the Republic of Latvia. One of her first visits was to Finland where she visited the Saeima (the Finnish parliament) and discussed the international reaction to Russia's invasion of Ukraine. German forces as part of NATO are stationed in the Baltic region to deter further aggression. Masloch's predecessor as ambassador, Christian Heldt, had unprecedently taken a position with NATO while still serving as the ambassador in 2024.

Masloch had previously led the West and Central Africa section in the German Federal Foreign Office since 2020. She had been based in Berlin but the Latvian embassy is in Riga. She had previously worked there as part of her assignments which also included the United Nations and North Macedonia.

In 2015 she had written a paper with Christiane Heldt, Ingo Niemann and Elisa Özbek about the need to ensure privacy. The paper was in support of the work at the UN following the revelations by Edward Snowden about international espionage. This had to the UN's appointment of Joseph Cannataci as the UN's UN Special Rapporteur on the protection of privacy.
