= List of ambassadors of Germany to South Africa =

The list of German ambassadors in South Africa contains all charge d'affaires of the German Empire and the Federal Republic of Germany in South Africa.

== History ==
An envoy, as chargé d'affaires, was sent for the first time in 1955, previously Consuls general, Envoy Extraordinary and Minister Plenipotentiary. The ambassador also has jurisdiction over Eswatini (formerly Swaziland) and Lesotho. The current headquarters of the embassy is in Pretoria. Before 1928, the headquarters of the Consulate General was Cape Town.

== German Empire ==
Name	Image	Term Start	Term End	Notes
Ernst Bieber		1885	1888	
Ernst Heinrich von Treskow	Ernst Heinrich von Treskow	1889	1895	
Bruno von Schuckmann	Bruno von Schuckmann	1895	1899	
Heinrich Johann Focke		1899	1901	
Friedrich von Lindequist	Friedrich von Lindequist	1901	1905	
Hans Paul von Humboldt-Dachroeden		1905	1914	
Alex Bernhard Tigges		1928	1929	
Paul Roh		1929	1933	Consul General 1st Class
Friedrich Wilhelm von Keßler		1931	1933	Consul General, Chargé d’Affaires
Emil Wiehl	Emil Wiehl	1933	1937	
Rudolf Leitner		1937	1939	

== Federal Republic of Germany ==
Name	Image	Term Start	Term End	Notes
Rudolf Holzhausen		1951	1954	1951: Consul General; 1952: Envoy; 1954: Ambassador
Gustav Strohm		1955	1957	
Hans Ulrich Granow		1958	1961	
Karl Overbeck		1961	1963	
Werner Junker		1963	1967	
Gustav Adolf Sonnenhol	Gustav Adolf Sonnenhol	1968	1971	
Erich Strätling		1971	1976	
Hans-Joachim Eick		1976	1980	
Ekkehard Eickhoff		1980	1983	
Carl Lahusen		1985	1986	
Fritz Ziefer		1987	1987	Counselor, Chargé d'Affaires
Immo Stabreit		1987	1992	
Hans-Christian Ueberschaer	Hans-Christian Ueberschaer	1992	1995	
Uwe Kaestner		1995	1998	
Harald Ganns		1998	2000	
Anna-Margareta Peters		2000	2003	
Harro Adt		2004	2007	
Dieter W. Haller		2007	2011	
Horst Freitag		2011	2015	
Walter Johannes Lindner		2015	2017	
Martin Schäfer		2017	2021	
Andreas Peschke		2021	Present	

== See also ==
- Germany–South Africa relations
