= List of ambassadors of Germany to Trinidad and Tobago =

The list of German ambassadors to Trinidad and Tobago contains the ambassadors of the Federal Republic of Germany to Trinidad and Tobago. The embassy is located in Port of Spain.

== History ==
The embassy is also Germany's diplomatic representation for Antigua and Barbuda, Barbados, Dominica, Grenada, Guyana, Saint Kitts and Nevis, Saint Lucia, Saint Vincent and the Grenadines and Suriname.

== Ambassadors ==
Name	Image	Term Start	Term End	Notes
Jens Petersen		1963	1966	
Fritz Gajewski		1966	1970	
Hans Hermann Haferkamp		1970	1974	
Wilfried Vogeler		1974	1978	
Karl-Heinz Rouette		1978	1983	
Johannes Reitberger		1983	1985	
Joachim Vogel		1985	1990	
Holger Eberle		1990	1996	
Gerd Plückebaum		1996	1999	
Ulrich Nitzschke	Ulrich Nitzschke	2000	2004	
Helmut Ohlraun		2004	2007	
Ernst Martens		2007–	2010	
Stefan Schlüter		2010	2014	
Lutz Görgens		2014	2017	
Holger Michael		2017	2019	
Ute König		2019	2023	
Christophe Eick		2023		

== See also ==
- Foreign relations of Trinidad and Tobago
