= List of permanent representatives of Germany to NATO =

This list of permanent representatives of Germany to NATO includes all permanent representatives of the Federal Republic of Germany to NATO since 1955.

German permanent representatives to NATO in Brussels
Name	Image	Dates served	Comments
Federal Republic of Germany
Herbert Blankenhorn		1955–1959	
Gebhardt von Walther		1959–1962	
Wilhelm Grewe		1962–1971	
Franz Krapf		1971–1976	
Rolf Friedemann Pauls		1976–1980	
Hans-Georg Wieck		1980–1985	
Niels Hansen		1985–1989	
Hans-Friedrich von Ploetz		1989–1993	
Hermann von Richthofen		1993–1998	
Joachim Bitterlich		1998–1999	
Gebhardt von Moltke		1999–2003	
Rüdiger Reyels		2003–2006	
Edmund Duckwitz		2006–2007	
Ulrich Brandenburg		2007–2010	
Martin Erdmann		2010–2015	
Hans-Dieter Lucas		2015–2020	
Rüdiger König		since 2020	
