= Boris Ruge =

German politician

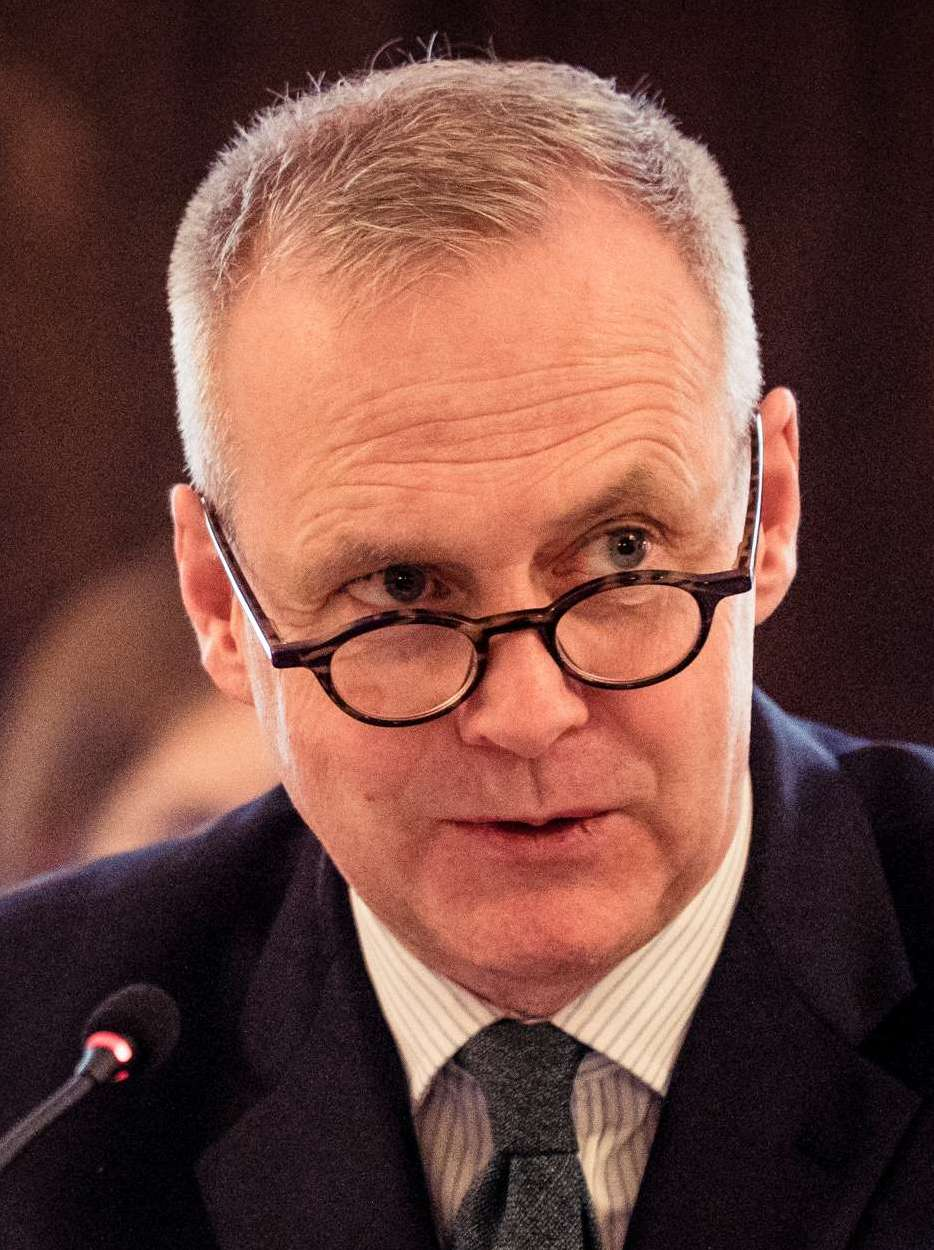

Boris Ruge is a German political figure. He is the current NATO Assistant Secretary General for Political Affairs and Security Policy.

== Early life and education ==
After graduating from high school in 1981, Ruge enlisted in the German Air Force, in which he served from 1982 to 1983. Ruge completed his undergraduate studies at the University of Cologne and received a master's degree from the University of North Carolina at Chapel Hill. He also holds a degree from Johns Hopkins University Bologna Center.

== Career ==
Ruge joined the Foreign Service in 1989.

From 2014 to 2016, Ruge served as German Ambassador to Saudi Arabia and Special Envoy to the Organization of Islamic Cooperation. He then served as Minister and Deputy Chief of Mission at the Embassy of Germany to the United States.

From 2019 to 2023, Ruge served as Vice Chairman of the Munich Security Conference.

In September 2023, Ruge became NATO Assistant Secretary General for Political Affairs and Security Policy. From September to December 2024, Ruge served as NATO Acting Deputy Secretary General.
