= Bernd Erbel =

German diplomat

Bernd Erbel (born 11 December 1947) is a German diplomat and is the former ambassador of the Federal Republic of Germany in Iran (October 2009 – October 2013).

== Early life ==
Bernd Erbel was born on born 11 December 1947 in Simmern im Hunsrück. He traveled to Turkey at age 12 with his father and his two brothers for a summer vacation. At the age of 14, he went to Egypt alone. He started traveling to the Middle East with his father when he was 15 years old. He visited Iran at the same age. when he was 19 years old visited Afghanistan. During a trip to Turkey at the age of 15, Bernd Erbel met a group of diplomats and learned about the job, the conditions and duties of diplomats. From this age, Erbel was thinking about his diplomatic career and finally chose this profession.

== Education ==
Erbel went to school in Karlsruhe and then studied in Munich. When he was a teenager, visited some Arab countries, first of all, Egypt, where he learned the Arabic language. After that, He studied Orientalism, which was his favorite field. Then he became a diplomat who knew law and worked in legal and consular affairs.

== Career ==
In 1977 Erbel worked at the German embassy in Beirut, Lebanon, followed by a career in Sanaa, Riyadh, and Cairo. From July 2004 until August 2006 he was the German ambassador in Iraq.

In 2013 Erbel retired and now resides in Germany.

In 2019 Erbel was appointed to the Instrument in Support of Trade Exchanges (INSTEX). Shortly after, Erbel stated that he would not be available for personal reasons to head the organization. His decision followed a report in German tabloid Bild drew attention to a YouTube interview in which he voiced criticism of Israel and its role in the Middle East and showed understanding for Iran's ambitions to develop a ballistic missile program.

== Resign from INSTEX ==
In August 2019, he was forced to resign after criticizing Israel. Erbel said during Jebsen's YouTube channel interview that "the Palestinians are the victims of our victims" and "there would be no Palestine problem if the Jewish state was founded in East Prussia".

== His opinion about Middle East ==
He has spent twenty-five years of his working life in the Middle East. According to him, despite many similarities and commonalities, he has witnessed many differences between the countries of the Middle East region. When he moved from Lebanon to Yemen and then went to Egypt and Saudi Arabia, the differences were so great for him that he could not imagine that these countries were in a geographical area.

In his view, many Germans think Iran is like the Arab countries, but it is not, and there are many differences between them. in fact, as there are many differences in the Christian world, this is also the case in the Muslim world.

Since he was the former German ambassador to Iran, he knows Tehran as the "most comfortable and most safer" place for Jews to live in the world.
