= Jürgen Schulz (diplomat) =

German diplomat (born 1964)

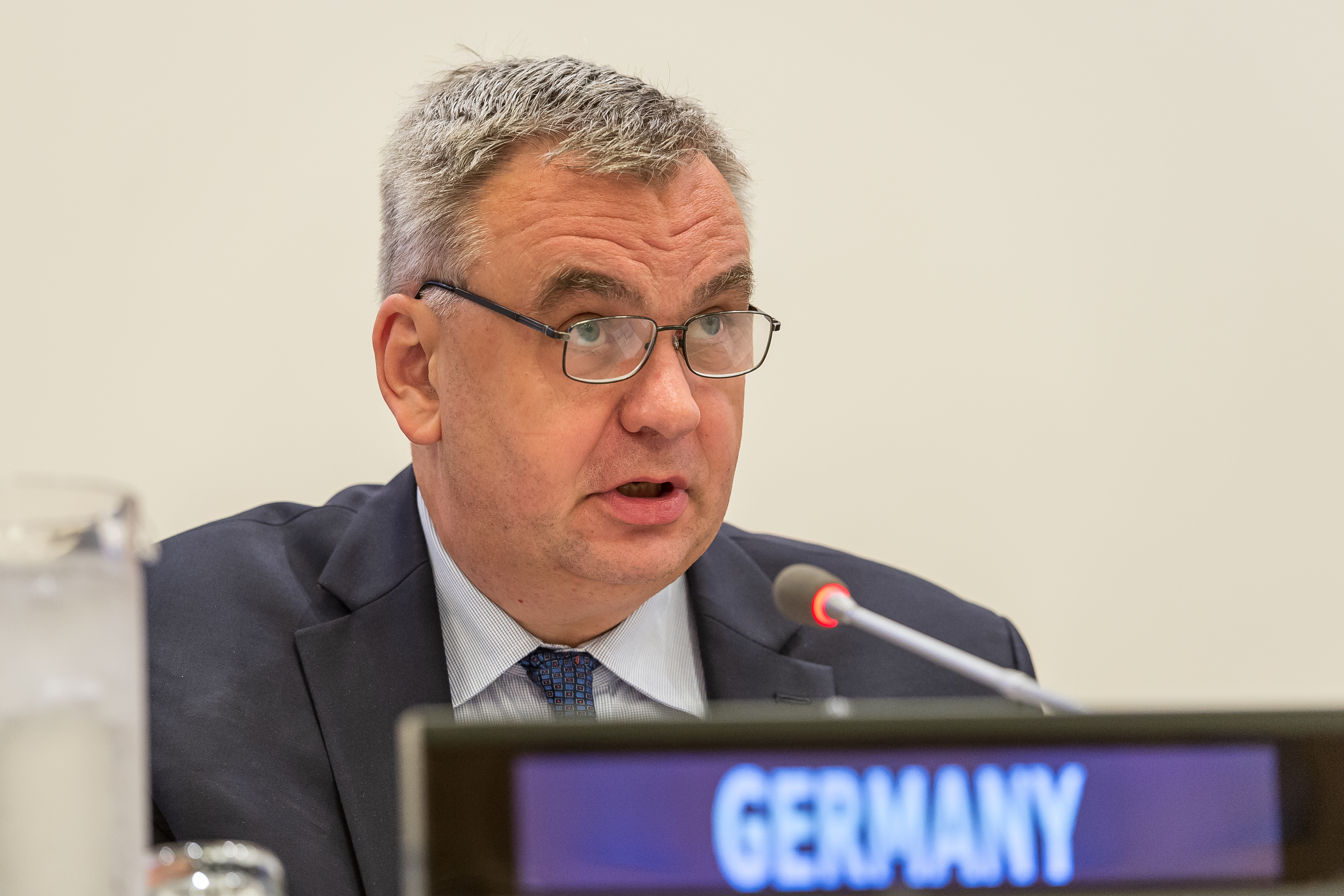
Deputy Permanent Representative of Germany to the United Nations, Jürgen Schulz, delivered a statement at the ninth Ministerial Meeting of the Friends of the CTBT on 27 September 2018.

Jürgen Schulz (born 1964) is a German diplomat. He served in several positions in the German Foreign service and has worked in the German representation to the NATO as well as to the United Nations.

== Early life and education ==
He went to school in his native Gladbeck. After he enrolled into the Ruhr University in Bochum from where he graduated in economics. Following he entered the foreign service in 1991. He has been working in the German Embassy in Bishkek, Kyrgyzstan between 1993 until 1996 and in Brussels, Belgium at the Political Department of the International Staff of the NATO from 1996 to 2001. Later he was assumed responsibilities at the Federal Chancellery in Berlin.

== Diplomatic career ==
For the Foreign Office in the Federal Chancellery he first worked in the Western Balkans Division between 2001 and 2004 as well as in the Iraq Staff in 2004 before becoming Deputy Head of for the European Security and Defense Policy Unit from 2005 to 2008. From 2008 to 2013 Jürgen Schulz was a head of division in the Federal Chancellery. Between 2008 and 2010 the head of division for Central, Southeast and Eastern Europe as well as for the South Caucasus and Central Asia and from 2010 to 2013 the head of division for the USA, Canada, Turkey, western, southern and northern European countries as well as for security and disarmament policy. From 2013 to 2016 Jürgen Schulz served as the Deputy Political Director and Security Policy Officer at the Federal Foreign Office before between 2017 and 2020 he served in several positions in the United Nations in New York, acting as the Vice President of the United Nations Economic and Social Council (ECOSOC) in 2017.

=== Ambassador to Turkey ===
Since July 2020, he acts as the German Ambassador to Turkey in Ankara. As such he toured the country and met with the Mayor of Izmir Tunc Soyer and also the Mayor of Ankara Mansur Yavas. In October 2021 he and nine other ambassadors were declared Persona non Grata after ten embassies released statements demanding the release of the Turkish entrepreneur Osman Kavala who has a verdict to be released from the European Court of Human Rights. Turkey refuses to release Kavala and accuses him for organizing the Gezi Park protests. After German politicians protested the life sentence Kavala received in April 2022, Schulz was summoned to the foreign ministry and told, Germany cannot interfere with the Turkish judiciary.

== Personal life ==
Jürgen Schulz has married Sheila Stanton in 1996.
