= Hans-Dieter Lucas =

German diplomat

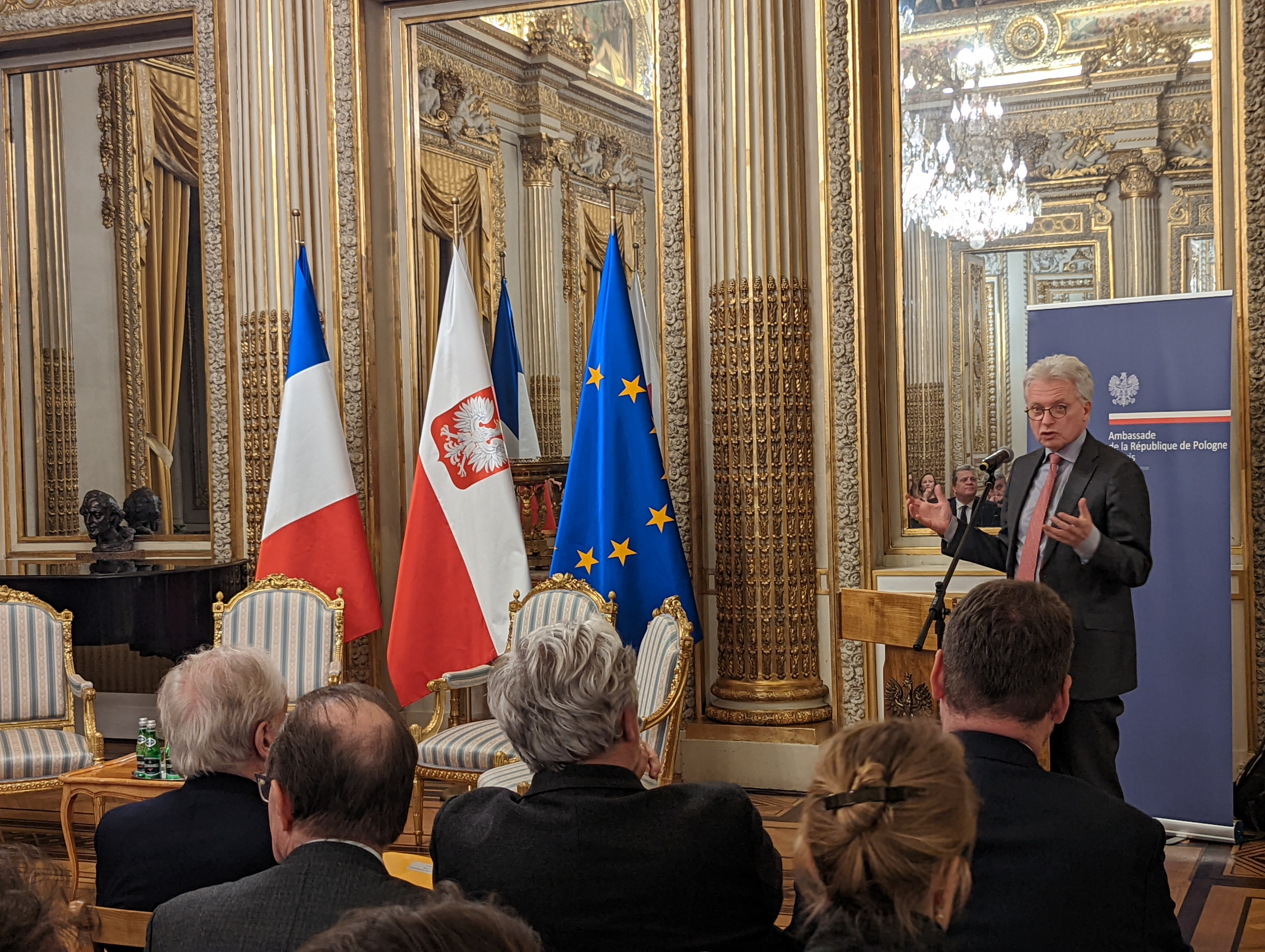
Hans-Dieter Lucas (2023)

Hans-Dieter Lucas (born 11 October 1959) is a German diplomat. He is currently serving as Ambassador of Germany to France and Monaco.

== Education ==
Lucas studied history, political science, law and Catholic theology in the Rhenish Friedrich Wilhelm University of Bonn.

== Career ==
- From 1987 to 1989 he worked in the political department of the Federal Foreign Office.
- From 1989 to 1991 he has served in the economic department at the Embassy of Germany, Moscow.
- From 1991 to 1995 he has served in the political department (Baltic States) of the Federal Foreign Office.
- From 1995 to 1998 he was Head of the personal office of former Federal Minister for Foreign Affairs Hans-Dietrich Genscher.
- From 1998 to 1999 he was Head of the speechwriting staff of former Federal Minister for Foreign Affairs Klaus Kinkel.
- From 1999 to 2003 he worked in the political department at the Embassy of Germany, Washington, D.C.
- From 2003 to 2006 he served as Head of division for Central-, Southeastern, Eastern Europe, South Caucasus, Central Asia of the Foreign and Security Policy Department of German Chancellery.
- From 2006 to 2010 Lucas was Director for Eastern Europe, the Caucasus and Central Asia of the Federal Foreign Office.
- From 2010 to 2011 he was Representative of the Federal Republic of Germany in the Political and Security Committee of the EU.
- He served from 2011 to 2015 as political director of the Federal Foreign Office.
- From 2015 to 2020 he was the Permanent Representative of Germany to NATO.
- In 2020 he was appointed Ambassador of Germany to France and Monaco.
- In August 2023, he is appointed Ambassador of Germany to Italy.
