= Philipp Ackermann =

German diplomat

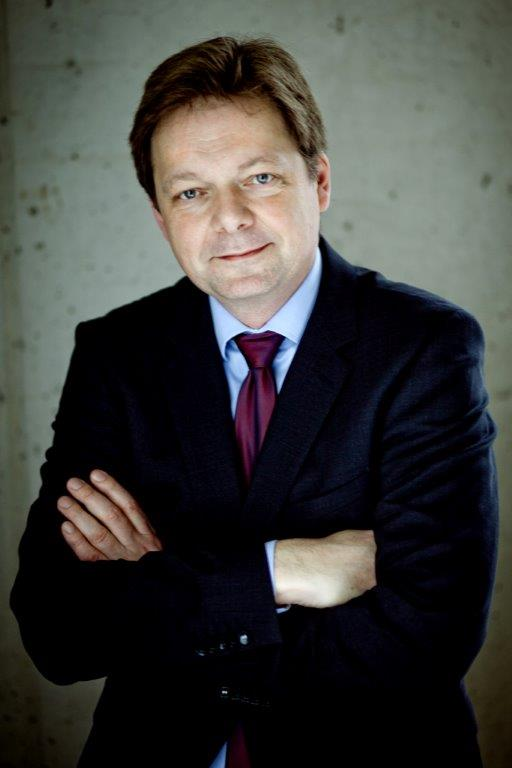
- Ackermann in 2016

Ambassador of Germany to India
- In office 2022–2026
- Preceded by: Walter J. Lindner

Ambassador of Germany to China
- Incumbent
- Assumed office September 2026
- Preceded by: Patricia Flor

Ambassador of Germany to Bhutan
- In office 2022–2026
- Preceded by: Walter J. Lindner

Personal details
- Born: Philipp Friedrich Johannes Ackermann; June 24, 1965 (age 61) Miltenberg, Bavaria, Germany

Philipp Friedrich Johannes Ackermann (born June 24, 1965) is a German diplomat. Since September 2026 he is Ambassador of Germany to China. From 2022 until 2026, he headed the German Embassy in New Delhi as Ambassador to India with secondary accreditation to the Kingdom of Bhutan.

== Biography ==
Philipp Ackermann was born in Miltenberg, the son of engineer Christoph Ackermann and his wife Brita Katharina Maria, née Countess Stenbock Fermor. His father was a member of the board of Villeroy & Boch. After graduating from Johannes-Butzbach-Gymnasium in Miltenberg in 1984 and completing his military service, Philipp Ackermann studied art history, economics and history at the universities of Bonn, Heidelberg and Utrecht. He completed his master's degree in Bonn in January 1990 and was awarded his doctorate there in February 1993.

He also joined the Federal Foreign Office in 1993. Stages of his career in the Foreign Service include a stay at the Dutch Ministry of Foreign Affairs as an exchange diplomat, three years as a press and political officer at the German Embassy in Rabat and three years at the political department of the Permanent Mission of Germany to the United Nations in New York.

In 2002, Foreign Minister Joschka Fischer appointed him to his ministerial office as a speechwriter. He remained in this position during Foreign Minister Frank-Walter Steinmeier's first year in office. From summer 2006, Philipp Ackermann headed the Provincial Construction Team in Kunduz. From 2007 to 2010, he was Head of the Political Department at the German Embassy in New Delhi. He was then Head of the Afghanistan/Pakistan desk at the Federal Foreign Office until 2014 and at the same time Deputy Special Representative of Germany for Afghanistan/Pakistan.

From 2014 to 2016, Ackermann worked as envoy and deputy ambassador at the German embassy in Washington D.C. In 2016, he became Commissioner for the Middle East and North Africa at the Federal Foreign Office.

=== Ambassador to India ===
Ackermann was made the German Ambassador in New Delhi in 2022 and gained attention when he and the embassy staff performed a dance flash mob to the Oscar-winning song Naatu Naatu in 2023, which was commented on positively by Indian Prime Minister Narendra Modi.

=== Ambassador to China ===
Ackermann was designated German Ambassador in Beijing on Oct 2, 2026 as part of a rotation of seven German ambassadors. He assumed office in September 2026, replacing Ambassador Patricia Flor, who is the new ambassador to Brasil.

== International Legal Foundation ==
In 2001, Philipp Ackermann was one of the co-founders of the International Legal Foundation in New York, a non-governmental organization that provides public defense for the indigent in post-conflict states. He was on the board of this organization for 15 years, including as Vice Chairman.
