= Tientsin incident =

1939 international incident between Japan and Britain

- Part of Second Sino-Japanese War
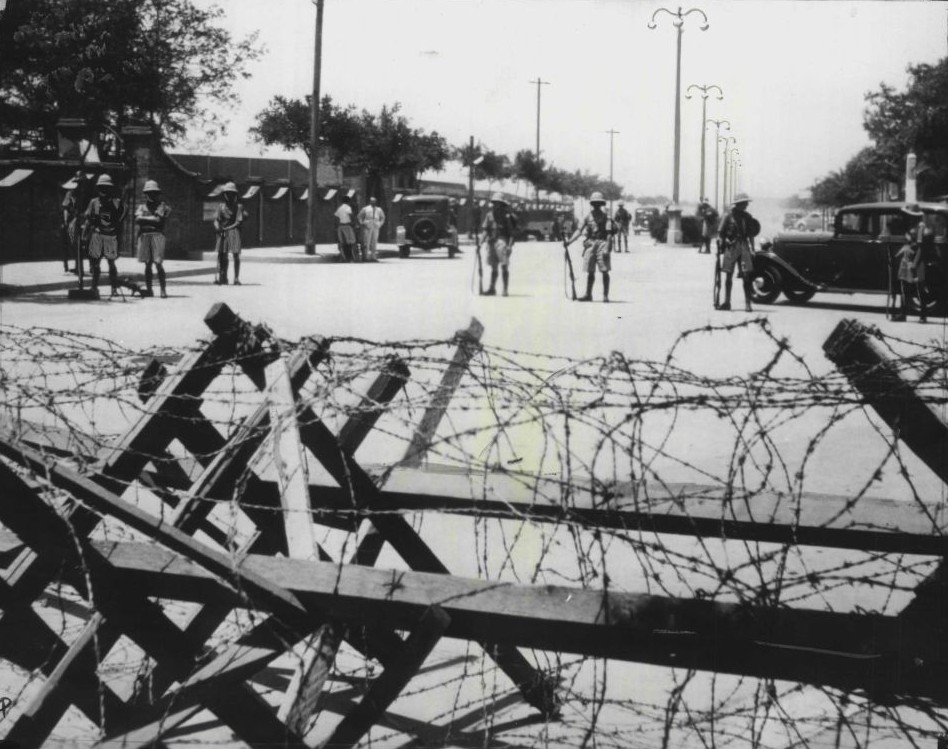
- British soldiers behind the barbed wire barricade erected by the Japanese around the British and French concessions in Tientsin in June 1939
Date	June 14, 1939 – August 20, 1939
Location	Tianjin, China
Result	Compromise solution

Belligerents
United Kingdom	(Empire of Japan) Japan

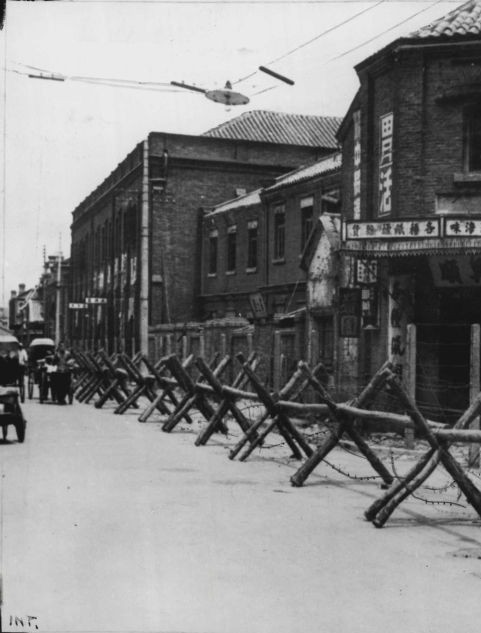
Barrier erected by Japanese troops around the British and French concessions of Tientsin in the summer of 1939

The Tientsin incident (天津事件) was an international incident created by a blockade by the Imperial Japanese Army's Japanese North China Area Army of the British settlements in the north China treaty port of Tientsin (modern day Tianjin) in June 1939. Originating as a minor administrative dispute, it escalated into a major diplomatic incident.

== Background ==
Starting in 1931 with the seizure of Manchuria, Japan had a policy of attempting to reduce Chinese independence with an ultimate aim of placing all of China within the Japanese sphere of influence. Britain's relations with China had not been particularly warm or close before the mid-1930s, but the rise of Japan had improved relations between London and Nanking. The British historian Victor Rothwell wrote: "In the middle 1930s, if China had a Western friend it was Britain. In 1935–36 Britain gave China real help with its finances and showed real concern about Japanese encroachments in north China. Realising that the only hope of inducing Japan to moderate these activities lay in an Anglo-American joint front, Britain proposed that a number of times, but was always rebuffed by Washington". In turn, improved Anglo-Chinese ties had strained relations between London and Tokyo.

On July 30, 1937, Tientsin fell to the Empire of Japan as part of a military operation in the Second Sino-Japanese War, but it was not entirely occupied since the Japanese mostly continued to respect the integrity and extraterritoriality of foreign concessions in Tientsin until 1941. In December 1937, the Japanese took Shanghai, China's business capital. It was a major blow to the government of Generalissimo Chiang Kai-shek, as 85% of all Chinese government revenue came from Shanghai. After the loss of Shanghai, the economic ability of China to continue to resist Japan was very much in doubt. Flush with a series of Japanese victories in China, in early January 1938, the Japanese prime minister, Prince Fumimaro Konoe, announced a set of sweeping "non-negotiable" war aims that would have transformed China into a virtual protectorate of Japan if they had been implemented. Since the beginning of the war in July 1937, the Japanese had taken much of northern China, including the former capital of Beijing and in the Yangtze Valley, they had taken Shanghai and China's capital, Nanking.

After taking Nanking on 14 December 1937, the Japanese had perpetrated the infamous Rape of Nanking in which the Imperial Army had gone on a rampage of arson, looting, torture, rape and murder that destroyed Nanking and killed somewhere between 200,000 and 300,000 civilians. After the victories, Konoe regarded the war as good as won. Ominously for the Chinese, Konoe spoke of the status of Manchukuo as the ideal basis for a Sino-Japanese peace. Sometimes, Konoe went even further and mentioned the protectorate that the Japanese had imposed on Korea in 1905, which had been followed by Korea's annexation in 1910, as an ideal basis for peace. Whether Manchukuo or Korea was the model of new relationship with Japan, Konoe was quite open that the Chinese had to accept a subordinate position to Japan if the war were ever to end to Japan's satisfaction.

Konoe's terms for making peace were so extreme and harsh that even the Japanese military objected to them on the grounds that Chiang would never accept peace with them. German Foreign Minister Konstantin von Neurath, who was attempting to mediate a compromise peace between China and Japan and Germany, which had friendly relations with both Japan and China and did not wish to choose between them, complained upon seeing Konoe's peace terms that they were so intentionally outrageous and humiliating demands that they seemed to be designed only to inspire rejection by Chiang. Konoe's main demands were for China to recognise Manchukuo, to sign the Anti-Comintern Pact, to allow Japanese officers to command the Chinese National Revolutionary Army, to allow Japanese troops to remain indefinitely in all areas of China that they had occupied and to pay reparations to Japan. China was to pay the entire costs of the war run up by Japan but also a punitive amount so that the Chinese people might reflect on the folly of seeking to challenge the might of Japan.

Konoe had deliberately chosen extreme war aims to sabotage any effort at a diplomatic compromise and thereby ensure that the war could end with Japan winning a total victory over China by the destruction of Chiang's government. Konoe's speech made Japan achieving anything less than his "non-negotiable" war aims would seem like a defeat. As Chiang immediately rejected in a speech Konoe's war aims as the basis for making peace, Japan would have to win a decisive victory in China to see the Konoe programme implemented, which had been Konoe's intention all along. On 16 January 1938, Konoe gave a speech announcing once more his "unalterable" commitment to achieving his programme and announced that since Chiang had rejected his peace terms, the Japanese government was now committed to the destruction of Chiang's government.

On 18 January 1938, Konoe made another speech in which he frankly admitted to seeking unacceptable peace terms so that Japan might achieve his real goal of seeking to "eradicate" Chiang's government from the face of the earth. Japan would never make peace with a China led by Chiang and so a compromise peace was now impossible, and Japan would have to win a total victory over China. As the Chinese government retreated deep into the interior of China, major logistical problems were posed for the Japanese Army, which simply could not project the sort of power into the interior of China to win the "total victory" that the Konoe programme required.

The Japanese Army, which understood the logistical problems of attempting to conquer such a vast country as China far better than Konoe ever did, had objected to the Konoe programme for precisely that reason. It committed Japan to winning a total victory over China that Japan did not have the power to achieve, but at the same time making, anything less than the achievement of the Konoe programme seemed like a defeat for Japan. In July 1938, Japan launched an offensive intended to capture Wuhan and win the war at last. The summer offensive of 1938 succeeded in taking Wuhan, but the Japanese failed to destroy the core of the Chinese National Revolutionary Army, which retreated further up the Yangtze. After the Wuhan offensive, the Imperial Army informed Tokyo that the troops in the central Yangtze Valley were at the end of a long, tenuous and very overstretched supply line, and no further advances up the Yangtze were yet possible. Unable to win the final victory on the battlefield, the Japanese turned to bombing as an alternative by launching an all-out bombing campaign intended to raze the temporary capital, Chongqing, to the ground.

The Japanese bombing destroyed Chongqing and killed hundreds of thousands of civilians but failed to break the Chinese will to resist. Another alternative Japanese approach to victory in China was the establishment in November 1938 of a puppet government under Wang Jingwei, the leader of the Kuomintang's left wing who had lost to Chiang in the succession struggle after the death of Sun Yat-sen, out of the hope that it would lead to an exodus of Kuomintang leaders to Wang's government and so cause the collapse of Chiang's government. However, the refusal of the Japanese to give Wang any real power discredited his government as a puppet regime in the eyes of the vast majority of the Chinese people.

At the same, time, Dai Li, the much-feared chief of the Chinese secret police, had begun a policy of sending undercover operatives into the areas of China occupied by the Japanese to assassinate collaborators and Japanese officials. Sometimes working closely with triad gangsters (Dai was a close friend and business partner of the crime lord Du Yuesheng, or "Big Eared Du", the leader of the Green Gang triad), Dai's men were responsible for hundreds of assassinations during the Sino-Japanese War. Between August 1937 and October 1941, Bureau of Investigation and Statistics agents were responsible for about 150 assassinations of Chinese collaborators and 40 Japanese officers in Shanghai alone. Chinese collaborators who lived among the Chinese population were much easier to kill than Japanese officers, who tended to stick to their barracks. Undercover agents tended to be young men, who graduated from provincial schools, rather than universities (the ultraconservative Dai was contemptuous of intellectuals, who he felt to have been exposed to too much Western influence for their own good) and were usually skilled in martial arts. Also, Juntong agents were expected to be unconditionally loyal and willing to die for the cause at all times.

With the war stalemated and Japan unable to win a decisive victory in China, Tokyo increasingly placed its hopes for victory on the economic disintegration of Chiang's government. It was a reasonable hope since the western regions in the upper Yangtze Valley around Chongqing were one of the poorest and most backward regions in China and incapable of providing the necessary economic base for sustaining the huge costs that were needed to fight a modern war. Furthermore, Japanese atrocities, most infamously the Rape of Nanking in December 1937, had sent 12 million Chinese civilians fleeing up the Yangtze Valley in the largest movement of refugees yet seen in world history, to escape the Japanese. The refugees required shelter, food and often medical treatment. By 1938, the Chinese government was caught in a "scissors crisis" between the enormous expenditure required to fight the war and a rapidly-plummeting tax base. Between 1937 and 1939, Chinese government spending rose by a third, and tax revenue fell by two thirds.

Faced with a lack of funds to continue the war, Chiang started to engage in increasing desperate measures to raise revenue such as organising sales of opium via Macau and Hong Kong in an operation overseen by Dai and Du. That the Kuomintang government was prepared to run the risk of the shipment being intercepted by either the Policia de Segurança Pública de Macau or the Royal Hong Kong Constabulary (respectively) and the consequent public relations disaster reflected the need for money. Chinese Finance Minister H. H. Kung simply printed more and more money, leading to one of the worst spirals of hyperinflation yet seen in the world. That seriously undermined the Chinese war effort, as Chinese soldiers and civil servants were paid in worthless Chinese yuan. It was then that Britain made a series of loans to China intended to stabilise the yuan.

The British government subscribed to a 1930s version of the "domino theory". If Japan took control of China, it was believed that inevitably, Japan would attack Britain's Asian colonies and the Dominions of Australia and New Zealand. As such, Neville Chamberlain's British government, despite being unwilling to go to war with Japan, was not prepared to accept a Japanese victory over China. From the viewpoint of London, it was much preferable for Japan to remain embroiled in China than to attack the British Empire. The British Ambassador in China, Sir Archibald Clark-Kerr reported to London that unless Britain gave China loans to continue the war, the economic collapse of Nationalist China, which the Japanese wanted, might very well occur.

In late 1938, Britain started to make a series of loans to China to allow Chiang to continue the war. By 1939, the Chinese government had received loans worth £500,000 from Britain, which provided Chiang with badly needed money to continue the war. Furthermore, in March 1939, the British government, began to an effort to stabilise the yuan by offering government guarantees to British banks that made loans to Kuomintang China and took in Chinese silver as collateral. The guarantees allowed British banks to lend China some £5 million, a step that the Japanese government publicly denounced as a "frontal attack" on the "New Order" in Asia that Japan wanted to build.

The British loans to China greatly offended the Japanese, who believed that if the British ceased their financial support of China, Japan would finally win the war. Konoe thought that the British effort to stabilise China's currency and thereby to prevent the complete economic collapse of China was the only thing standing between the Chinese and the total victory that was required for his programme. Since the loans to China were guaranteed by the British government, the Chinese silver as collateral was not strictly necessary from an economic point of view, but it was felt that for public relations, the Chinese had to put up collateral, as the British people might otherwise disapprove of their government guaranteeing loans to a country with finances as chaotic as China. At the same, both the United States and the Soviet Union also made loans to the Kuomintang government, again to keep Japan embroiled in China. The Americans lent China some $45 million starting in December 1938, and the Soviets lent a sum of rubles equivalent to $250 million. To persuade the Soviets not to support China, the Japanese began a border war with the Soviet Union in 1938–1939, but it ended with the Japanese being badly defeated by the Soviets in August 1939 in the Battles of Khalkhin Gol.

== Assassination of Cheng Hsi-keng ==
In the summer of 1939, a major crisis in Anglo-Japanese relations occurred with the Tientsin Incident. On April 9, 1939 Cheng Hsi-keng, the manager of the Japanese-owned Federal Reserve Bank of North China, was assassinated by Chinese nationalists at Tientsin's Grand Theatre. The bomb attack that killed Cheng also killed several innocent bystanders, who had the misfortune to be sitting close to him in the theatre. The Japanese accused six Chinese men living in the British concession of being involved in the assassination. The local British police arrested four of the six and handed them over to the Japanese with promises that they would not be tortured and would be returned to British custody within the next five days. Under torture, two of the four confessed to being involved in the assassination. Although the confessions were obtained by torture, the local British police concluded that the accused were involved in the assassination. Once the four men returned to British custody, Madame Soong Mei-ling, the wife of Chiang Kai-shek admitted to the British Ambassador in Chongqing, Sir Archibald Clark-Kerr that the accused assassins were Chinese operatives involved in resistance work and lobbied Clark-Kerr to prevent the accused being returned and executed by the Japanese. The local British consul, Mr. Jamieson, had not kept London well-informed on the details of the case, especially the fact that he had promised the Japanese that he would hand over the accused assassins. The British Foreign Secretary, Lord Halifax, hearing that the confessions had been obtained by torture, ordered that the accused assassins should not be handed back to the Japanese.

The local commander of the Japanese North China Army in Tientsin, General Masaharu Homma, was regarded as friendly by the British, but the Chief of Staff of the North China Army, General Tomoyuki Yamashita, was known to be a believer in abolishing all Western concessions in China. Since early 1939, General Yamashita had advocated the end of the British concession in Tientsin, and he used the British refusal to turn over the alleged assassins to convince his superiors in Tokyo to order a blockade of the concession. By 1939, the Japanese had largely persuaded themselves that it was British economic support that was keeping China going and that a confrontation with Britain was needed to bring matters to a head. A secret study from the Gaimusho argued that to permit all of China to fall within the Japanese sphere of influence would mean the effective end of British influence in Asia, as a Sino-Japanese combination would be a colossus that would dominate Asia, and that from the British viewpoint China could not be allowed to lose, which ruled out any possibility of the Gaimusho effecting any change in British policy. Unlike the International Settlement in Shanghai, which belonged jointly to the United States and the United Kingdom, the British Concession in Tientsin was just that and so the Japanese had already decided to blockade it in early 1939, as it would mean avoiding a confrontation with both Britain and America at once. An additional problem for the British was normally the concession police handed over Chinese suspects to the Tientsin police to be tried by Chinese courts, but since the British did not recognise the Wang regime in Nanking, which nominally controlled the Tientsin police, the British police had stopped handing Chinese suspects to a police force that took its orders from a regime that was not recognised by London as the Chinese government. Many Juntong agents had taken to operating out of the British concession since the worst thing that would happen to them if captured by the concession police would be they'd be kept in the local jail, which was considered vastly preferable to being tortured and executed by the Japanese. Despite Japanese pan-Asian propaganda on uniting all the peoples of Asia together in peace, prosperity and brotherhood, the Chinese preferred to be the prisoners of the British than of the Japanese.

At the same time, the fact that since late 1938, the Gaimusho in its negotiations with the Auswärtige Amt had been refusing the German request to convert the Anti-Comintern Pact into an anti-British military alliance, insisting that Japan would sign only an anti-Soviet military alliance reflected the fact that Tokyo was not yet prepared to go to war with Britain. As the Kriegsmarine was several years away from being ready for a war with Britain (the Z plan, which Hitler endorsed in January 1939, called for a Kriegsmarine ready for war with the Royal Navy by 1944), German Foreign Minister Joachim von Ribbentrop wanted an alliance with a strong naval power like Japan as the best compensation for Germany's naval weakness.

== Blockade ==
On June 14, 1939, the Japanese Northern China Area Army surrounded and blockaded the foreign concessions over the refusal of the British authorities to hand over four Chinese who had assassinated a Japanese collaborator and taken refuge within the British concession. Anyone wishing to leave or enter the concession was publicly stripsearched by Japanese soldiers, and food and fuel were not permitted to enter the concession. To cut off the concession, the Japanese Army built an electrified wire fence around it. The Japanese government declared the issue of the accused killers not to be the point of the blockade and that handing over the four would not end the blockade. A Japanese spokesmen stated: "The arrow is already off the bow and therefore the question cannot be settled by the mere transfer of the four suspect assassins". The Japanese demanded the British government to turn over all silver reserves belonging to the Chinese government within British banks to them, to forbid all anti-Japanese radio broadcasts from anywhere in the British Empire, to ban school textbooks that the Japanese government considered offensive and to end the issuing of fapi currency. The real aim of the Japanese was not the handing over of the assassins but the end of British financial support of China.

On 16 June 1939, the British Foreign Office in a press statement stated that the acceptance of the Japanese demands would "mean the abandonment under the threats of force of the policy His Majesty's Government has pursued in the past, which is the same as that of the other Great Powers with interests in the Far East". On 20 June 1939, Lord Halifax told the House of Lords that the Japanese had failed to produce any evidence independent of the confessions gained by torture, and Britain would not hand over the four accused assassins until such evidence emerged. For a time, it appeared likely that the situation would precipitate an Anglo-Japanese war, especially when public opinion in Britain was enraged by the entirely correct newspaper reports of British women being forced to strip in public at bayonet point by Japanese soldiers, and that Japanese officers conducted vaginal searches in public. The stories about the public strip searches led to a flood of "Yellow Peril" stereotypes being widely invoked in the British media. British Admiral of the Fleet Sir Roger Keyes considered the situation to be tantamount to a declaration of war. Tientsin then had a population of approximately 1500 British subjects, half of whom were soldiers, and was a major centre for British trade in northern China. British Prime Minister Neville Chamberlain considered the crisis to be so important that he ordered the Royal Navy to give greater attention to a possible war with Japan than to war with Germany. Within Japan, the media, the Army and various right-wing groups waged a violent anti-British propaganda campaign in the summer of 1939. Much to the pleasure of the Japanese right, Home Minister Kōichi Kido did nothing to restrain them in their anti-British media offensive. Encouraging the Japanese in their confrontation was that they had broken the American diplomatic codes and so knew from reading intercepted reports from the American embassies in Chunking and Tokyo that the British had asked for American support but had been refused. The message from Nelson Johnson, the American ambassador to China, that any sanctions imposed on Japan were likely to cause a war and his advice against sanctions for that reason reinforced the Japanese government in its stance, but it also gave an impression of American weakness and that the Americans feared war with Japan and would pay almost any price to avoid it.

Meanwhile, the border war with the Soviet Union was escalating rapidly, and as the Japanese discovered to their cost, the Red Army was a formidable foe, the Japanese Army suffering a casualty rate of 70% between July–September 1939. Ever since the Russian-Japanese War of 1904–05, Japanese generals had held Russians in contempt, and the ferocity of the fighting had astonished the Japanese, who had expected an easy victory.

== Resolution ==
On June 26, 1939, the Royal Navy and the Foreign Office reported to the British Cabinet that the only way of ending the blockade was to send the main British battle fleet to Far Eastern waters, and with the Danzig crisis with Nazi Germany threatening Poland made that militarily inadvisable. If the bulk of the Royal Navy was sent to Singapore, Britain would not be able to impose a blockade on Germany if it invaded Poland and so one of Britain's main deterrents against Adolf Hitler deciding to invade Poland would be removed, which would encourage Hitler to choose war. In addition, Chamberlain faced strong pressure from the French not to weaken British naval strength in the Mediterranean because of the danger of Benito Mussolini's Italy honouring the Pact of Steel if war broke out in Europe. The Pact of Steel signed in Rome in May 1939 was an offensive-defensive German-Italian alliance, which meant there was a real possibility that if war with Germany began, Italy would join.

French Prime Minister Édouard Daladier made it very clear to London that he would much prefer to see the British Mediterranean fleet stay in the Mediterranean than for it being sent to Singapore, and Britain could expect no support from France in the crisis with Japan. Following an unsuccessful effort to obtain support from Americans, who told the British that the United States would not risk war with Japan purely for British interests, Chamberlain ordered Sir Robert Craigie, the British ambassador in Tokyo, to find any way of ending the crisis without too much loss to British prestige. During the course of negotiations with the Japanese, Craigie took advantage of divisions within the Japanese leadership, especially between the Prime Minister, Hiranuma Kiichirō, who wished for a greater degree of control over the military, and the military itself, which wanted less civilian control.

In addition, there were divisions within the Japanese government: one faction that wanted to use the crisis to start a war with Britain, and another that argued that since the war with China was already compounded the border war with the Soviet Union, starting a third war was unwise. Even more astonishing to the Japanese Army, which expected an easy triumph, the Red Army defeated it at the Battle of Khalkhin Gol, which came as a great shock and caused many Japanese generals to lose their bellicosity, if only momentarily. Japanese Foreign Minister Hachirō Arita regularly met with Craigie and by 22 July 1939 felt that he was winning in his talks. On 26 July 1939, the United States gave the six-month notification that it would not renew the 1911 Treaty of Commerce and Navigation, which increased the amount of economic pressure the British could bring against Japan. The Roosevelt administration had carried its version of appeasement in the Far East, but actions such as the Tientsin incident had persuaded the Americans that Japan was out of control, and the United States needed to start applying economic pressure via such moves like cancelling the 1911 treaty to pressure the Japanese to stop challenging the existing international order in Asia. Hirohito was furious, telling his aide-de-camp, Hata Shunroku:

"It could be a great blow to scrap metal and oil. Even if we can purchase [oil and scrap] for the next six months, we will immediately have difficulties thereafter. Unless we reduce the size of our army and navy by one-third, we won't make it.... They [his military and naval leaders] should have prepared for something like this a long time ago. It's unacceptable for them to be making a commotion about it now".

The American historian Herbert Bix wrote it was typical of Hirohito to criticise his generals and admirals for not anticipating the American move and preparing for it, instead of considering the end of the war with China that had brought about the cancellation of the 1911 treaty.

From Rome, the Japanese ambassador, Toshio Shiratori, reported that Britain would seek revenge for the blockade and warned, "We must be aware that there is little hope for Japan to resume its former good relationship with Britain". Shiratori advised that Japan should agree to the German request made in November 1938 to convert the Anti-Comintern Pact into an anti-British military alliance. From Berlin, the very pro-German Japanese ambassador, General Hiroshi Ōshima, likewise advised that Japan would sign a military alliance with Germany and Italy as the best way to resolve the crisis in its favour. On 24 July 1939, Heinrich Georg Stahmer, who was in charge of Asian relations at the Dienststelle Ribbentrop, met with Ōshima to tell him that Ribbentrop had not heard from the Japanese since he presented his proposals for a military alliance on 16 June 1939 and informed him that Adolf Hitler was a preparing a major speech on foreign policy at the planned NSDAP rally in Nuremberg for September. Thus, Ribbentrop needed answers now about whatever Japan was going to proceed or not. On 28 July, Ribbentrop met with Ōshima, pressed him to sign an alliance with Germany, argued that the two nations shared a common enemy in the form of Britain and suggested that such an alliance would improve Japan's odds of resolving the Tienstsin crisis in its favour. The Army Minister, General Seishirō Itagaki, threatened to resign and bring down the government if a military alliance with Germany and Italy was not signed at once, but on 4 August 1939, Home Minister Kido met with him and persuaded him to wait. Under the Japanese constitution of 1889, the Army and Navy reported directly to the Emperor, not the Prime Minister, and the Army and Navy ministers had to be active-duty officers who were nominated by their respective services, not the Prime Minister. The Army and/or Navy ministers by resigning and preventing the Prime Minister from forming the quorum necessary for the cabinet to meet could topple a government, thus allowing the military, which formed a "state within the state", the veto power over the decisions of the government.

At a conference to discuss the question of whatever to sign an alliance with Germany and Italy on 8 August 1939, Itagaki again demanded for Japan to sign an alliance at once. Prime Minister Hiranuma came out against such an alliance and argued that with the situation in Europe on the brink of war, that Japan should not yet be dragged into a war with Britain. On 31 March 1939, Britain had guaranteed Poland's independence while Germany was threatening war with Poland if the Poles did not permit the Free City of Danzig to rejoin Germany. Hiranuma argued that an alliance with Germany might drag Japan into an unwanted war with Britain and might lead to the Soviet Union joining the "peace front" and so Japan would have to fight both the Soviets and the British while the war with China was still going on. Hiranuma was tactful enough not to remind Itagaki that the Imperial Army was currently losing the border war that it was fighting against the Soviet Union. Finance Minister Ishiwata Sōtarō advised against war with Britain on economic grounds, and Foreign Minister Arita stated that purpose of the confrontation was to force the British to stop backing China, not to cause a new war. The main fear was the British "peace front" that was meant to contain Germany in Europe would soon come into being, forcing Japan to fight an alliance of Britain, France, and the Soviet Union that might be joined by the United States. Navy Minister Admiral Yonai stated there was no possibility of victory if Japan had to fight an Anglo-French-Chinese-Soviet-American alliance. The conference concluded that no alliance should yet be signed with Germany and Italy. Itagaki, through his deputy Machijiri Kazumotō, the chief of the Military Affairs Bureau, sent letters to the German ambassador, General Eugen Ott, and the Italian ambassador, Giacinto Auriti:

"The Army has made every effort to obtain a favorable decision on the pact at the Five Ministers Conference of August 8, but no progress has been made since Japan's proposal of June 5. The situation is so critical that the Army minister will not hesitate to resign as a final measure, which almost definitely will lead to the resignation of Ōshima and Shiratori. The resignations will at first cause a great setback to the pact, but will gradually strengthen the foundation in Japan for it. But there is no other way for me to assume responsibility except by resigning. It is planned to execute the foregoing decision by August 15".

However, the German insistence for the proposed alliance to be directed against Britain, rather than the Soviet Union, led to Itagaki not resigning after all.

At the same time, the British applied economic pressure on the Japanese by raising their tariffs on Japanese goods. Though Craigie knew that the dispatch of the British battle fleet had been ruled out, he often implied during his talks with the Japanese that Britain would go to war to end the blockade. His policy of bluff and divided counsel within different factions within the Japanese government let Craigie persuade the Japanese to back down from their more extreme demands, such as their demand to turn over the Chinese silver in British banks, but he agreed to submit to the Japanese demand to hand over the Chinese suspects.

The decisive pressure for a compromise solution on the Japanese side came from the Shōwa Emperor, who made it clear that he was displeased with the prospect of a war with Britain while the war with China was still unresolved, and Japan on the brink of an all-out war with the Soviet Union. Additionally, he felt a war with Britain would push Japan too much into the embrace of Germany to the advantage of Germany. Since he was worshipped as a living god by the Japanese people, the knowledge of his unhappiness about the crisis was a powerful force for a peaceful resolution of the crisis within the halls of power in Japan.

Craigie and Japanese Foreign Minister Hachirō Arita, agreed on a two-paragraph "formula" to form the basis of a settlement. Britain recognised that there was a state of war in China, which necessitated certain Japanese actions, and Britain promised not to work against Japanese actions. On August 20, 1939, the British chose to turn over the four Chinese fugitives to end the standoff; the Chinese were later executed by the Japanese by public beheadings in violation of the agreement. The handover of the four Chinese to the Japanese sparked much outrage in Britain, with MPs being flooded with letter of protests from their constituents, a public relations disaster for the Chamberlain government that the Israeli historian Aron Shai observed would now be better remembered if the Second World War Two had not begun two weeks later. The Chinese government handed in a note of protest asking the British to reconsider and saying that the four men were going to be executed by the Japanese, but Chiang was pleased that the British did not give in to the Japanese economic demands.

== Consequences ==
The Tientsin crisis highlighted the gap between the foreign policy of Japan's civilian government, as expressed through the Japanese ambassador to Britain, Mamoru Shigemitsu, who attempted to defuse the situation through negotiation, and the Japanese Army, the commander of the North China Army, Field Marshal Hajime Sugiyama, escalating the situation by demands for an end to the foreign concessions in Tientsin altogether. The British historian D.C. Watt argued that the partial diplomatic victory by the Japanese helped to keep Japan neutral during the first year of World War II. It also highlighted the weakness of the British position in Asia, both militarily and diplomatically, with its failure to enlist the United States to take a stronger position in its support. The Japanese succeeded in forcing the British to turn over the four Chinese suspects but failed in to achieve their main aim of forcing Britain to end its economic support of China. By October 1940, the British government had provided loans to China to the value of £10 million. That figure does not include the loans made to China by British banks. The loans from Britain and the United States had, by the fall of 1940, provided China with $245 million in loans, allowed Nationalist China a modicum of economic stability and let it continue the war.

Most importantly, the Tientsin incident marked the beginning of a pattern in which Japan would seek a confrontation with the Western powers backing the Chinese to force them to abandon their support of Chiang, a practice that would ultimately end with Japan going to war with the United States and Britain in December 1941.

== See also ==
- Battles of Khalkhin Gol
