= Jan Hecker =

German diplomat (1967–2021)

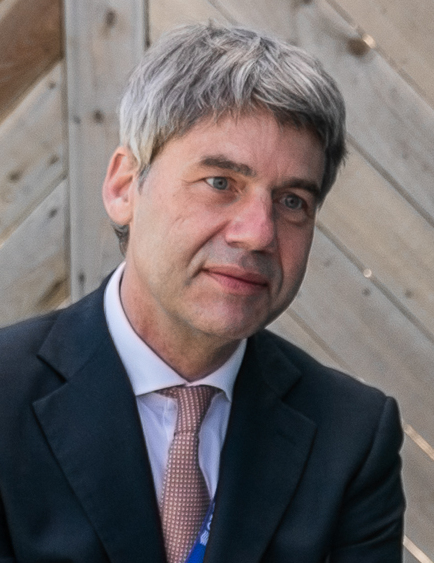
- Hecker in 2021

15th German Ambassador to China
- In office 24 August 2021 – 5 September 2021
- President: Frank-Walter Steinmeier
- Chancellor: Angela Merkel
- Preceded by: Clemens von Goetze
- Succeeded by: Frank Rückert (acting)

Personal details
- Born: 15 February 1967; Kiel, West Germany
- Died: 5 September 2021 (aged 54); Beijing, China
- Children: 3
- Education: University of Freiburg; University of Grenoble; University of Göttingen
- Occupation: Lawyer, ambassador

Jan Hecker (15 February 1967 – 5 September 2021) was a German lawyer and diplomat. He was an advisor to German Chancellor Angela Merkel and a judge at the Federal Administrative Court, as well as an adjunct professor at the European University Viadrina. He died shortly after taking office as German ambassador to the People's Republic of China.

== Life and education ==
Hecker attended schools in Flensburg, Kiel, Wilhelmshaven and Oslo, Norway, achieving the abitur in Flensburg in 1986. Hecker, the son of a naval officer, served between 1986 and 1988 as a soldier in Eutin.

He studied law and political science in Freiburg, Grenoble and Göttingen from 1988 to 1994, completing with an MA degree in 1994. He passed the second legal state exam in Berlin in 1996, followed by post-graduate studies at the University of Cambridge where he obtained a Master of Laws (LLM) degree in 1997. He obtained his doctorate in law in 1997 on the subject of European integration as a constitutional problem in France at the University of Göttingen.

== Career ==
From 2000, he taught at the European University Viadrina in Frankfurt (Oder), the Humboldt University Berlin, the Free University Berlin and the University of Applied Sciences for Administration and Administration of Justice. In 2005 he habilitated at the Viadrina on the topic of market-optimising economic supervision. In 2010, Hecker was appointed by the Viadrina as an adjunct professor of public law and European law.

He was employed by the law firms Hengeler Mueller and Freshfields Bruckhaus Deringer, but professional curiosity drew him away just two years later. Hecker joined the Federal Ministry of the Interior at the end of 1999. During his time at the Federal Ministry of the Interior, he was seconded to the Federal Office for the Protection of the Constitution for two years, among other things.

In 2011 Hecker was appointed a judge at the Federal Administrative Court in Leipzig. In 2015 he was brought to Berlin as an advisor to chancellor Merkel. He became a confidant of Merkel, especially influencing her foreign policy.

Hecker became ambassador to the People's Republic of China at the end of August 2021. He was expected to continue Merkel's policy of maintaining a balanced, but friendly relationship with the People's Republic of China. He died only a few days after taking office at the age of 54, having just completed the mandatory two weeks COVID-19 quarantine. German foreign minister Heiko Maas has stated that "Due to the circumstances of his death, we have no evidence that Jan Hecker's death is in any way related to his official function as German ambassador in Beijing".
