= Arthur von Rex =

German diplomat, ambassador to Qajar Iran, Japan and China (1856-1926)

Count Arthur Graf von Rex

German Ambassador to Japan
- In office 13 April 1911 – 23 August 1914
- Preceded by: Alfons Mumm von Schwarzenstein
- Succeeded by: Wilhelm Solf (1920)

German Ambassador to China
- In office 1906–1911
- Preceded by: Alfons Mumm von Schwarzenstein
- Succeeded by: Karl von Luxburg; Johann Friedrich Wilhelm Elmershaus von Haxthausen

German Ambassador to Persia
- In office 1898 – May 1906
- Preceded by: Günther von Gaertner-Griebenow
- Succeeded by: Wilhelm Stemrich

German Ambassador to Venezuela
- In office 1896–1898
- Preceded by: Friedrich Wilhelm von Kleist
- Succeeded by: Otto L. Schmidt-Leda

Personal details
- Born: Arthur Alexander Kaspar von Rex; 2 February 1856 Dresden, Kingdom of Saxony
- Died: 4 September 1926 (aged 70) Flims, Switzerland
- Parents: Alexander Caspar von Rex (father); Olga von Möhrmann (mother)
- Education: University of Berlin; Leipzig University; University of Strasbourg

Arthur Alexander Kaspar von Rex (2 February 1856, Dresden — 4 September, 1926, Flims) was a German diplomat.

== Life ==
Arthur Alexander Kaspar von Rex came from the noble family von Rex. He was the second son of Count Alexander Caspar von Rex (1827–1870), Lord of Zehista, and his wife Olga, née von Möhrmann (1830–1890).

After graduating from school, von Rex began studying law, which he completed at the Friedrich Wilhelm University in Berlin, the University of Leipzig, and the University of Strasbourg. He entered the Foreign Service in November 1882. In 1883 he was sent to the German legation in Lisbon as a Secretary of Legation. From there, he moved to the German legation in Rio de Janeiro in 1885 and was at the legation in Paris starting in 1887. He was deployed there for only one year and was transferred to the German legation in Belgrade in 1888. This was followed by service at the legation in Saint Petersburg in 1889 and as Minister Resident starting in 1894. He was recalled after two years and ordered to Caracas as Envoy in 1896. This was followed in 1898 by the assumption of the legation in Tehran. Here he replaced the ill Günther von Gaertner-Griebenow. During his tenure in Tehran, Rex collaborated with Paul Röhll, the German consul in Baku and a director at Siemens & Halske. In consultation with Rex, Röhll secured permission from the governor-general of Turkestan to travel through Central Asian cities to gather economic intelligence and product samples, aiming to expand German trade and evaluate the region's potential for German industry. He held this office in Tehran for eight years, and his assignment there ended in May 1906. His successor there was Wilhelm Stemrich (1852–1911).

In Beijing, von Rex succeeded Alfons Baron Mumm von Schwarzenstein (1859–1924) in 1906. During this tenure as Envoy in China, he was appointed "Privy Councillor" (German: Wirklicher Geheimer Rat) with the predicate "Excellency". Due to this first assignment in East Asia, he familiarized himself with the region's specific problems, standards of conduct, traditions, and cultural peculiarities. This period also saw his efforts in 1907 for an alliance between the governments of Guangxu, the USA with Theodore Roosevelt, and Germany with Wilhelm II. From February 1911, he was informed that a transfer to Japan was imminent.

In Japan, von Rex again replaced the previous ambassador Alfons Mumm von Schwarzenstein in Tokyo, who had to quit the service due to an eye ailment. The handover of business took place on April 13, 1911. During this time, the balancing of power-political alliances in the East Asian region was crucial in Japan, as was the close observation of the development of strategic partnerships developing between Japan and the USA as well as Japan and Great Britain. The German urge to acquire colonies in this region and secure overseas spheres of influence had not insignificant effects on relations with Japan. However, von Rex had bet on the wrong horse in Japan from the start. His entire political effort was directed towards Prince Katsura Tarō (1848–1913); however, when the latter had to resign following a motion of no confidence in the Japanese parliament in February 1913, not only the Charge d'Affaires of the legation but the entire top personnel faced closed doors regarding the Japanese government. When two higher-ranking followers of the later Prime Minister Ōkuma Shigenobu (1838–1922) were denounced in the press for bribery by the German company Siemens-Schuckert, the measure of mistrust was completely full. Von Rex's tenure coincided with the beginning of the Taishō period, which resulted above all in a strengthening of the military and the suppression of internal forces in Japan. Urgent action would have been required on site. Especially since this development amounted to a clear turning away from Germany and a swing towards an alliance with Great Britain. Von Rex did not take note of these changes in the situation and even in his reports to Germany, he seems to have assumed completely different political framework conditions. However, his tenure also included particularly positive results, such as the founding of the Japanese-German Society, the founding of Sophia University in 1913, and his extremely agile efforts to give the German Society for Natural History and Ethnology of East Asia (OAG) a recognized place in the Japanese public sphere. During his tenure in Tokyo, he was Honorary Chairman of the OAG.

Since von Rex received hardly any politically significant, let alone confidential, information from the top government levels from about the halfway point of his tenure as Germany's diplomatic representative, he was also unaware of certain processes of cooperation between Japan and Great Britain. While Berlin was still dreaming of harmony with Japan, the Japanese side was shaking things up, preparing to cross over to the mainland with their armed forces to take Tsingtau. Only England's temporary veto held them back until early August 1914. When, with the outbreak of World War I, England called upon Japan on August 7, 1914, to fulfill its alliance obligations, the prime minister and foreign minister seemed to have been waiting for just that. Protest in the cabinet was also quickly swept aside. Within a few days, an ultimatum was presented to von Rex, which had a deadline of August 23, 1914. In it, the Japanese government demanded the disarmament of all German ships in the region and the unconditional surrender of Kiautschou without compensation. Promptly on August 23, 1914, at 14:00 Japanese time, the declaration of war by the Ōkuma Shigenobu government in Tokyo and the passports were handed to von Rex by the Foreign Minister's private secretary Yoshida Yosaku. Thus, diplomatic relations between the German Empire and the Empire of Japan were ended. On August 29, 1914, he boarded the American steamer "Minnesota" and committed one last affront here. A senior official of the Japanese Foreign Ministry had come aboard the ship to see him off. He wanted to wish him a safe journey on behalf of the foreign minister. But von Rex left him standing there and demonstratively turned his back on him. On October 18, coming via the USA, he arrived back in Germany. He was placed in temporary retirement as early as December 1914. At the age of 63, his final retirement arrangement ensued in 1923.

Arthur von Rex died on September 4, 1926, in Waldhaus Flims, Switzerland.

== Literature ==
- Tobias C. Bringmann: Handbuch der Diplomatie 1815–1963. Saur, Munich 2001, ISBN 3-598-11431-1.
- Kansei Gakuin Daigaku: Kwansei Gakuin University annual studies. Volumes 27–29, The University, 1978, p. 123.
- Johannes Hürter (Ed.): Biographisches Handbuch des deutschen Auswärtigen Dienstes 1871–1945. 5. T–Z, Nachträge. Issued by the Foreign Office, Historical Service. Volume 4: Bernd Isphording, Gerhard Keiper, Martin Kröger: Schöningh, Paderborn 2014, ISBN 978-3-506-71844-0.
- Hans Schwalbe, Heinrich Seemann (Eds.): Deutsche Botschafter in Japan. Deutsche Gesellschaft für Natur- und Völkerkunde Ostasiens, Tokyo 1974, pp. 59ff.
- Holmer Stahncke: Die diplomatischen Beziehungen zwischen Deutschland und Japan 1854–1868. Franz Steiner Verlag, Stuttgart 1987, ISBN 3-515-04618-6.
- Karl Voigt: Schnurrige Begebenheiten, komische Käuze und Originale unter den Deutschen in Japan in den ersten Jahrzehnten dieses Jahrhunderts nebest einigen anderen Erzählungen. Ninomiya, 1948
- Peter Winzen: Das Kaiserreich am Abgrund. Die Daily-Telegraph-Affäre und das Hale-Interview von 1908. Franz Steiner Verlag, Stuttgart 2002, ISBN 3-515-08024-4, p. 72.
- Gothaisches genealogisches Taschenbuch der gräflichen Häuser. Volume 47, 1874, pp. 697–698.

Preceded by Friedrich Wilhelm von Kleist	Envoy of the German Empire in Caracas; 1896–1898	Succeeded by Otto L. Schmidt-Leda
Preceded by Günther von Gaertner-Griebenow	Envoy of the German Empire in Tehran; 1898–1906	Succeeded by Wilhelm Stemrich
Preceded by Alfons Mumm von Schwarzenstein	German Envoy in Beijing; 1906–1911	Succeeded by Karl von Luxburg; Johann Friedrich Wilhelm Elmershaus von Haxthausen
Preceded by Alfons Mumm von Schwarzenstein	Ambassador of the German Empire in Tokyo; 1911–1914	Succeeded by Wilhelm Solf 1920
