= List of ambassadors of Germany to China =

Ambassador of the Federal Republic of Germany to the People's Republic of China Deutscher Botschafter in der Volksrepublik China
- Plaque of German diplomatic missions

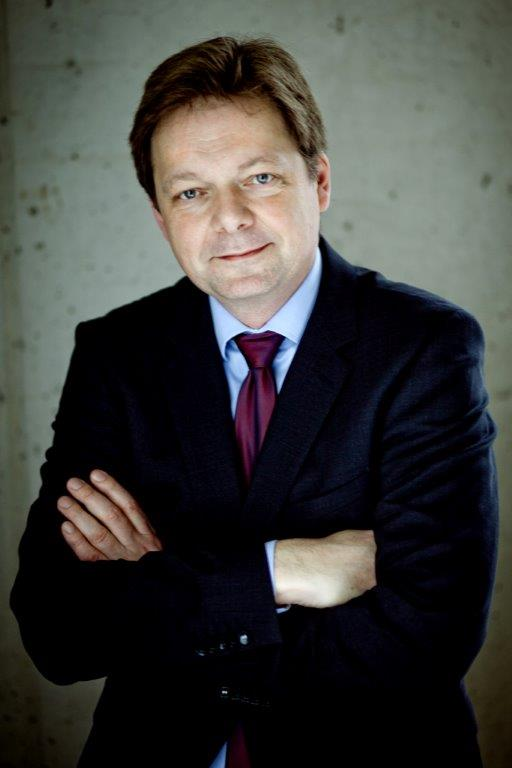
- Incumbent; Philipp Ackermann since September 2026
- Style: His Excellency
- Residence: Beijing
- Nominator: The Chancellor
- Appointer: The President; Frank-Walter Steinmeier
- Formation: 1873; 153 years ago
- First holder: Max von Brandt
- Website: china.diplo.de

The ambassador of Germany to China is an officer of the German Foreign Office and the head of the Embassy of the Federal Republic of Germany to the People's Republic of China. The position has the rank and status of an ambassador extraordinary and plenipotentiary and is currently held by Philipp Ackermann. The Federal Republic of Germany and the PRC have enjoyed diplomatic relations since 1972, while the German Democratic Republic had relations with the PRC from 25 October 1949. Unofficial representation to Taiwan has been undertaken by the German Institute Taipei since 2000.

== Office holders ==
=== German Ministers to China, 1873–1931 ===
Incumbent	Start of term	End of term
Max von Brandt	1873	1893
Gustav Freiherr Schenck zu Schweinsberg	1893	1896
Edmund Friedrich Gustav von Heyking	1896	1899
Clemens von Ketteler	1899	1900
Alfons Mumm von Schwarzenstein	1900	1905
Arthur von Rex	1906	1911
Elmershaus von Haxthausen	1911	1914
Emil Krebs (Chargé d'Affaires)	February 1914	March 1914
Paul von Hintze	1914	1917
Relations severed on China's entry in the First World War.
Herbert von Borch	1928	1931

=== Ambassadors of Germany to China, 1931–1945 ===
Incumbent	Start of term	End of term
Oskar Trautmann	1931	1938
Ambassador recalled on outbreak of the Sino-Japanese War. Recognition transferred to Reorganized National Government.
Heinrich Georg Stahmer	1941	1942
Ernst Wörmann	1943	1945

=== Ambassadors of the Federal Republic of Germany ===
Incumbent	Start of term	End of term
Heinrich Röhreke (Chargé d'Affaires)	10 October 1972	1973
Rolf Friedemann Pauls	1973	1976
Erwin Wickert	1976	1980
Per Fischer	1980	1987
Hannspeter Hellbeck	1987	1992
Armin Freitag	1992	1995
Konrad Seitz	1995	1999
Hans-Christian Ueberschaer	1999	2001
Joachim Broudré-Gröger	2001	2004
Volker Stanzel	2004	2007
Michael Schaefer	2007	2013
Michael Clauss	August 2013	August 2018
Clemens von Goetze	September 2018	August 2021
Jan Hecker	24 August 2021	6 September 2021
Frank Rückert (Chargé d'Affaires)	6 September 2021	July 2022
Patricia Flor	July 2022	June 2026
Philipp Ackermann	September 2026	incumbent

=== Ambassadors of the German Democratic Republic, 1949–1990 ===
Incumbent	Start of term	End of term
Johannes König	1950	1955
Richard Gyptner	1955	1958
Paul Wandel	1958	1961
Josef Hegen	1961	1964
Günter Kohrt	1964	1966
Martin Bierbach	1966	1969
Gustav Hertzfeldt	1969	1973
Johann Wittik	1973	1976
Helmut Liebermann	1976	1982
Rolf Berthold	1982	2 October 1990

== See also ==
- Germany-China relations
- Foreign relations of Germany
