= Walter Jürgen Schmid =

German diplomat

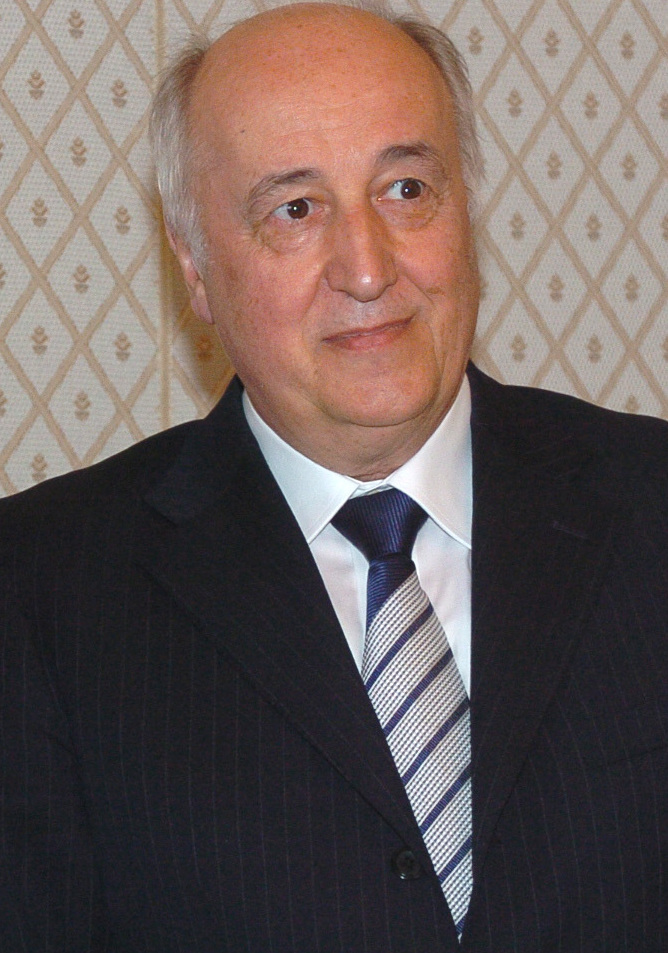

German Ambassador to the Holy See
- In office 2010–2011
- Preceded by: Hans-Henning Horstmann
- Succeeded by: Reinhard Schweppe

German Ambassador to Russia
- In office 2005–2010
- Preceded by: Hans-Friedrich von Ploetz
- Succeeded by: Ulrich Brandenburg

German Ambassador to Guinea
- In office 1992–1994
- Preceded by: Hubert Beemelmans
- Succeeded by: Hans-Günter Gnodtke

Personal details
- Born: 24 November 1946 (age 79)
- Spouse: Livia Vergallo
- Education: Royal College of Defence Studies
- Alma mater: University of Tübingen; LMU Munich; University of Aix-en-Provence

Walter Jürgen Schmid (born 1946) is a German diplomat who served as the Ambassador of the Federal Republic of Germany to Guinea, Russia, and the Holy See.

== Early life ==
After graduating from high school, Schmid completed his basic military service from 1966 to 1967. From 1968 to 1973 he studied law at the University of Tübingen, LMU Munich and the University of Aix-en-Provence. From 1973 to 1975 he was a court trainee and received his juris doctor degree.

== Career ==
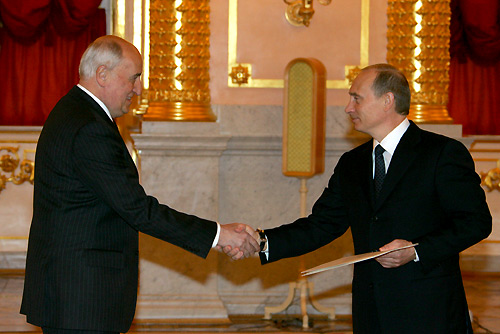
Schmid presenting his Letter of Credence to then-President of Russia Vladimir Putin on 8 November 2005.

He began his service at the Foreign Office in 1976 as an attaché before becoming personal advisor to State Minister Klaus von Dohnanyi. His first posting abroad was the embassy in Montevideo, Uruguay before he moved to the German embassy in Ankara, Turkey in 1982. From 1986 to 1991 he was Senate Director in the Senate Chancellery of Hamburg. His first posting as ambassador took him to Conakry, Guinea, from 1992 to 1994. In 1995, he went to the Royal College of Defence Studies in London for a year. He worked in the disarmament department of the Foreign Office until 2000, before being appointed deputy commissioner and finally, in 2003, Federal Government Commissioner for Disarmament and Arms Control.

From July 2005 to early 2010, Walter Jürgen Schmid was German ambassador to Moscow, and he presented his Letter of Credence to then-President of Russia Vladimir Putin on 8 November 2005. He was succeeded by Ulrich Brandenburg.

In September 2010 he succeeded Hans-Henning Horstmann as Ambassador Extraordinary and Plenipotentiary of the Federal Republic of Germany to the Holy See and presented his letter of accreditation to Pope Benedict XVI in Castel Gandolfo. Upon his retirement on 7 October 2011, Schmid received a personal letter from Pope Benedict XVI. He was succeeded by Reinhard Schweppe.

== Personal life ==
Schmid is married to Livia Vergallo-Schmid.
