= List of ambassadors of Germany to Russia =

Ambassador of Germany to Russia
- Deutscher Botschafter in Russland
- Incumbent; Clemens von Goetze since 2026
- Residence: Moscow

== Ambassadors ==
=== Ambassador of the German Empire to the Russian Empire (1871–1914) ===
Name	Image	Term Start	Term End	Notes
Heinrich VII, Prince Reuss of Köstritz	Heinrich VII, Prince Reuss of Köstritz	1868	1876	
Hans Lothar von Schweinitz	Hans Lothar von Schweinitz	1876	1891	
Bernhard von Werder	Bernhard von Werder	1892	1895	
Hugo Fürst von Radolin	Hugo Fürst von Radolin	1895	1901	
Friedrich Johann von Alvensleben	Friedrich Johann von Alvensleben	1901	1905	
Wilhelm von Schoen	Wilhelm von Schoen	1905	1907	
Friedrich von Pourtalès	Friedrich von Pourtalès	1907	1914	

Interruption due to World War I. Both the German Empire and Russian Empire was dissolved soon after.

=== German Ambassadors to the Soviet Union (1918–1991) ===
Name	Image	Term Start	Term End	Notes
Wilhelm von Mirbach	Wilhelm von Mirbach	1918	1918	Assassinated in Moscow by Left Socialist-Revolutionaries.
Vacant		1918	1921	
Kurt Wiedenfeld		1921	1922	
Ulrich von Brockdorff-Rantzau	Ulrich von Brockdorff-Rantzau	1922	1928	
Herbert von Dirksen	Herbert von Dirksen	1928	1933	
Rudolf Nadolny	Rudolf Nadolny	1933	1934	
Friedrich-Werner Graf von der Schulenburg	Friedrich-Werner Graf von der Schulenburg	1934	1941	
Interruption in relations due to World War II and the Occupation of Germany. Ambassadors listed here until 1991 were from West Germany.
Wilhelm Haas	Wilhelm Haas	1956	1958	First ambassador since the re-establishment of diplomatic relations.
Hans Kroll	Hans Kroll	1958	1962	
Horst Groepper		1962	1966	
Gebhardt von Walther		1966	1968	
Helmut Allardt		1968	1972	
Ulrich Sahm	Ulrich Sahm	1972	1977	
Hans-Georg Wieck		1977	1980	
Andreas Meyer-Landrut	Andreas Meyer-Landrut	1980	1983	
Hansjörg Kastl		1983	1987	
Andreas Meyer-Landrut	Andreas Meyer-Landrut	1987	1989	
Klaus Blech		1989	1993	

=== Ambassadors of the Federal Republic of Germany to the Russian Federation (1993–present) ===
Name	Image	Term Start	Term End	Notes
Otto von der Gablentz	Otto von der Gablentz	1993	1995	
Ernst-Jörg von Studnitz	Ernst-Jörg von Studnitz	1995	2002	
Hans-Friedrich von Ploetz	Hans-Friedrich von Ploetz	2002	2005	
Walter Jürgen Schmid	Walter Jürgen Schmid	2005	2010	
Ulrich Brandenburg	Ulrich Brandenburg	2010	2013	
Rüdiger Freiherr von Fritsch	Rüdiger Freiherr von Fritsch	2014	2019	
Géza Andreas von Geyr	Géza Andreas von Geyr	2019	2023	
Alexander Graf Lambsdorff	Alexander Graf Lambsdorff	2023	2026	
Clemens von Goetze		2026	present	

== See also ==
- Embassy of Germany, Moscow
- List of ambassadors of Russia to Germany
