= Ernst Woermann =

German diplomat

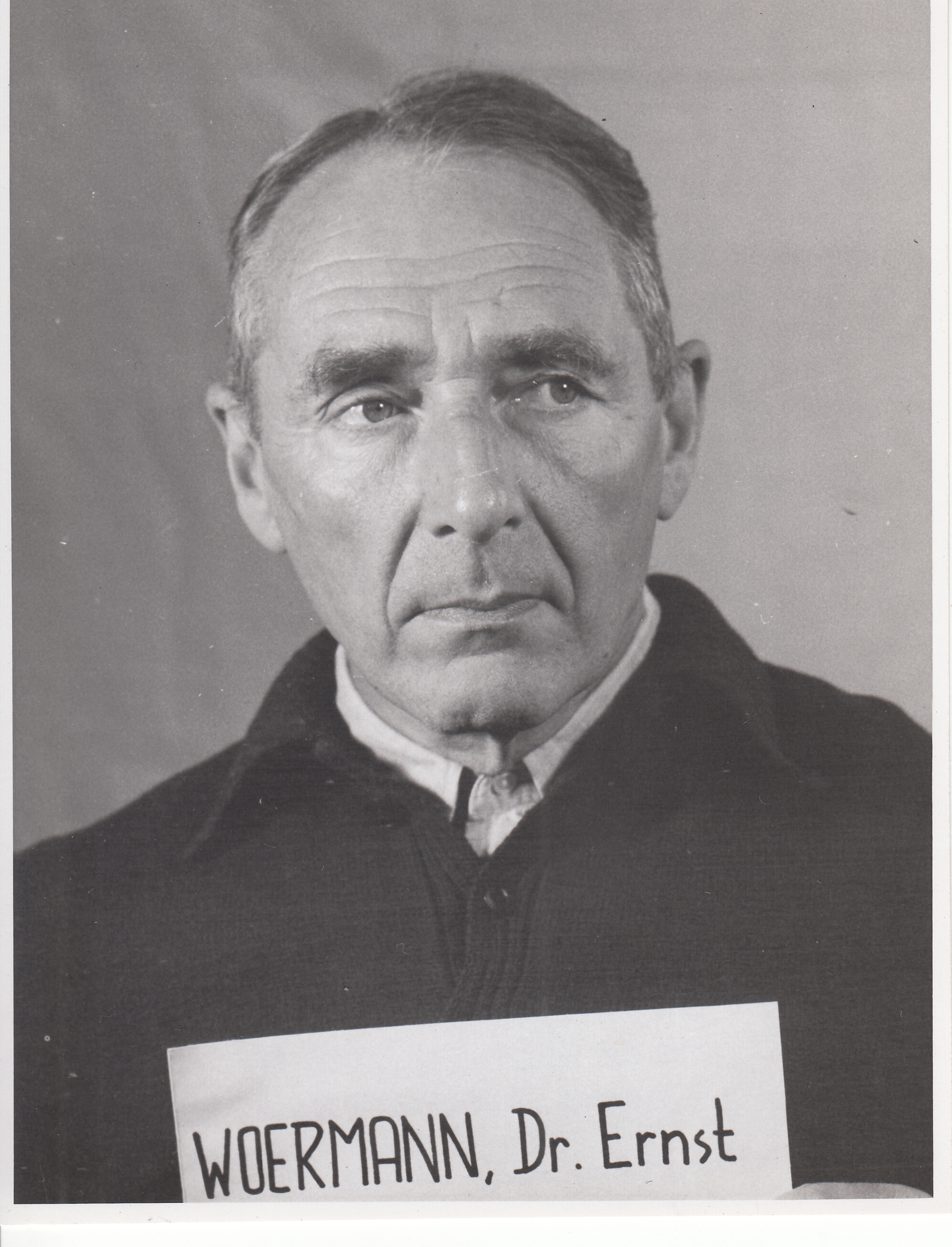
Woermann in Allied custody, c. 1947

Ernst Woermann (30 March 1888 in Dresden, German Empire – 5 July 1979 in Heidelberg, West Germany) was a German diplomat who worked for the Foreign Office under the Third Reich. He was a junior state secretary of the German Foreign Ministry (1940–43) and the German ambassador to the Nanjing Nationalist Government, the Japanese puppet government in China (1943–45).

== Biography ==
Woermann was the son of German art historian Karl Woermann, and had been born in Dresden in 1888. After attending a gymnasium, Woermann studied law at Heidelberg University, the Ludwig-Maximilians-Universität München, the University of Freiburg and Leipzig University. He got a doctorate in law and afterwards fought in World War I as an enlisted soldier, and then as a senior lieutenant (Oberleutnant). Following the end of the war and demobilization, Woermann worked in the Hamburg courts (Hamburger Justizdienst) and then the Foreign Ministry (from 1919). In 1920, Woermann was among the German delegation at the Paris Peace Conference and was part of the German embassy staff in France. In 1925, he was transferred to Vienna before working in the main department of the Foreign Ministry. Woermann was named "Envoy 1st class" in 1936 and worked at the embassy in London, being a close confidante of Joachim von Ribbentrop. On 1 December 1937 he became a member of the NSDAP.

After von Ribbentrop was appointed the German foreign minister in April 1938, Woermann replaced Ernst von Weizsäcker as the head of the political department of the Foreign Office. He also received the rank of SS-Standartenführer (equivalent of a colonel). In 1940, he became the junior state secretary (Unterstaatssekretär) of the ministry.

He handled the request of Indian nationalist Subhas Chandra Bose who wanted Nazi Germany to form an alliance with him. Woermann was unwilling to entertain this demand and considered Bose unpopular in comparison with Mahatma Gandhi and Jawaharlal Nehru. Later, Adolf Hitler during his only meeting with Bose in late May 1942 refused to entertain Bose's requests and facilitated him with a submarine voyage to East Asia. From 3 August 1943 until the end of World War II, he served as the German ambassador to China, after Germany recognized the pro-Japanese Nationalist Government in Nanjing, led by Wang Jingwei.

Woermann was tried at the "Wilhelmstrasse" Ministries Trial by the American military tribunal. On 11 April 1949, he was sentenced to 7 years in prison for crimes against peace, war crimes, and crimes against humanity. On 12 December, his sentence was lowered to 5 years after his conviction for crimes against peace was overturned. He was released from prison in January 1950.

Diplomatic posts
Preceded by Heinrich Georg Stahmer	German Ambassador to China (Nanjing regime); 1943–1945	Succeeded by Heinrich Carl Franz Röhreke (1972) (PRC)
