= Walter J. Lindner =

German diplomat

Walter Johannes Linder

State Secretary of the Federal Foreign Office
- In office 2017–2019
- Foreign ministers: Sigmar Gabriel; Heiko Maas

Spokesman of the Federal Foreign Office
- In office 2002–2006
- Foreign minister: Joschka Fischer

Ambassador of Germany to India
- In office 2019–2022
- Preceded by: Martin Ney
- Succeeded by: Philipp Ackermann

Ambassador of Germany to Bhutan
- In office 2021–2022
- Preceded by: Position established
- Succeeded by: Philipp Ackermann

Personal details
- Born: November 25, 1956 (age 69)
- Children: 1
- Education: LMU Munich

Walter Johannes Lindner (born 25 November 1956) is a German ex-diplomat and professional musician. He served as State Secretary of the German Foreign Office from 2017 to 2019 under foreign ministers Sigmar Gabriel and Heiko Maas and was spokesman of the German Foreign Office from 2002 to 2006 under foreign minister Joschka Fischer. In his last posting before retirement, he was ambassador of Germany to India from 2019 to 2022 and in 2021, became the first German ambassador to the Kingdom of Bhutan.

As a musician and studio-owner he has released nine records with a tenth album in the works. He has also served in Ankara, Managua and New York, and as Head of the Foreign Ministry’s Crisis Center, as Director for African Affairs and as the ambassador to Kenya, Somalia, Burundi, Seychelles, Venezuela and South Africa, Lesotho und Swaziland. Lindner also served as Special Representative of Chancellor Angela Merkel and the German Government for the fight against Ebola (Ambassador).

In March 2024 German Edition House Ullstein published his first book: Der alte Westen und der Neue Süden - was wir von Indien lernen sollten ("The Old West and The New South - What we should learn from India") with co-author Heike Wolter. Indian Edition-House Juggernaut published an English version in January 2025, ”What the West should learn from India”. Since November 2023 he is also public speaker at London Speakers Bureau.

== Diplomatic service ==
Walter J. Lindner entered diplomatic service in 1988. He has served numerous postings in Germany's Federal Foreign Office such as Deputy Head of the Task Force for Human Rights, the Federal Foreign Office Spokesperson and Spokesman for Foreign Minister Joschka Fischer. He has been the German Ambassador in Kenya, Seychelles, Venezuela, South Africa and India.

== Life as a musician ==
At the Richard Strauss Conservatory (de), now part of the University of Music and Performing Arts Munich, Linder learnt the piano, flute, guitar, bass and orchestra conducting. He also studied jazz in Graz, Austria. He then saved enough money driving taxis and trucks in Germany and went to Berklee College of Music in Boston.
