= Clemens von Goetze =

German diplomat

Goetze in 2023, during a meeting with Rahm Emmanuel

Clemens Robert Alexander von Goetze (born March 29, 1962) is a German diplomat, serving as German Ambassador to Russia since 2026.

== Personal life ==
Von Goetze was born in Wilmersdorf, West Berlin to a family of lawyers. His grandfather was a judge of partial Jewish descent. He received his Abitur from the Albert-Schweitzer-Schule in Hofgeismar. After performing his national service in Munich and Kassel, he received a masters degree in history and a Doctor of Laws from the University of Erlangen.

Von Goetze has a wife, Sonja, and two children.

== Career ==
He entered the Federal Foreign Office upon graduation in 1990. Aside from two postings to the embassies in Manila and Ankara, von Goetze mostly worked in Berlin, where he held supervisory positions within the Ministry and in its relations with the Bundestag and the European Parliament. Before 2015, he was head of the Africa, Asia, Latin America and Middle East desk.

He received his first ambassadorial posting, to Israel, in 2015, where he served until 2018. Von Goetze remarked that being a German diplomat in Israel was "easy", considering the German-Israeli friendship. He oversaw the jubilee year of German-Israeli diplomatic ties in 2015.

From 2018 to 2021, he served as ambassador to China. Goetze's tenure in China overlapped with the outbreak of the COVID-19 pandemic and other strains in the Sino-German relationship, including disputes regarding trade relations and human rights in Hong Kong and Xinjiang.

From 2021 to 2024, he was ambassador to Japan, where he advocated for closer cooperation in economic matters and defense and security, particularly after the Russian invasion of Ukraine. From 2024 to 2026, he was ambassador to Mexico.

In 2026, he was appointed ambassador to Russia, succeeding Alexander Graf Lammsdorff, who took Goetze's former post in Tel Aviv. Arriving in the midst of the Russo-Ukrainian war, Goetze was received coolly in Moscow. A spokesperson for the Russian Ministry of Foreign Affairs suggested that he may be "deluded" after he stated that he had gotten a warm welcome from Russian citizens.
