= Alfons Mumm von Schwarzenstein =

German diplomat (1859–1924)

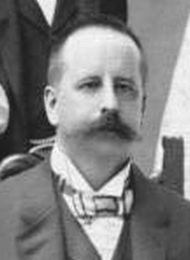

Philipp Alfons Freiherr Mumm von Schwarzenstein (19 March 1859 – 10 July 1924) (also known as Alfons von Mumm) was a diplomat of the German Empire. He succeeded the murdered Baron Clemens von Ketteler as ambassador in Beijing in 1900.

== Early life ==
Mumm studied law at Göttingen University and entered the diplomatic service afterwards.

== Career ==
He served in London (1885), Washington D.C. (1888), Bucharest (1892–93), Rome (1893–94), Luxembourg (1898) and again in Washington (1899). During his years in China, he dealt with the Boxer Rebellion and signed The Boxer Protocol on September 7, 1901, on behalf of Germany, maintained an extraordinarily good relation with Empress Dowager Cixi, but also he took many pictures of China in the 1900s as an amateur photographer. From 1909-11, he was ambassador of the German Reich in Japan. He retired in 1911, but was reactivated 1914 in Berlin.

In March through November 1918, he represented the German Reich in Kiev.

== Personal life ==
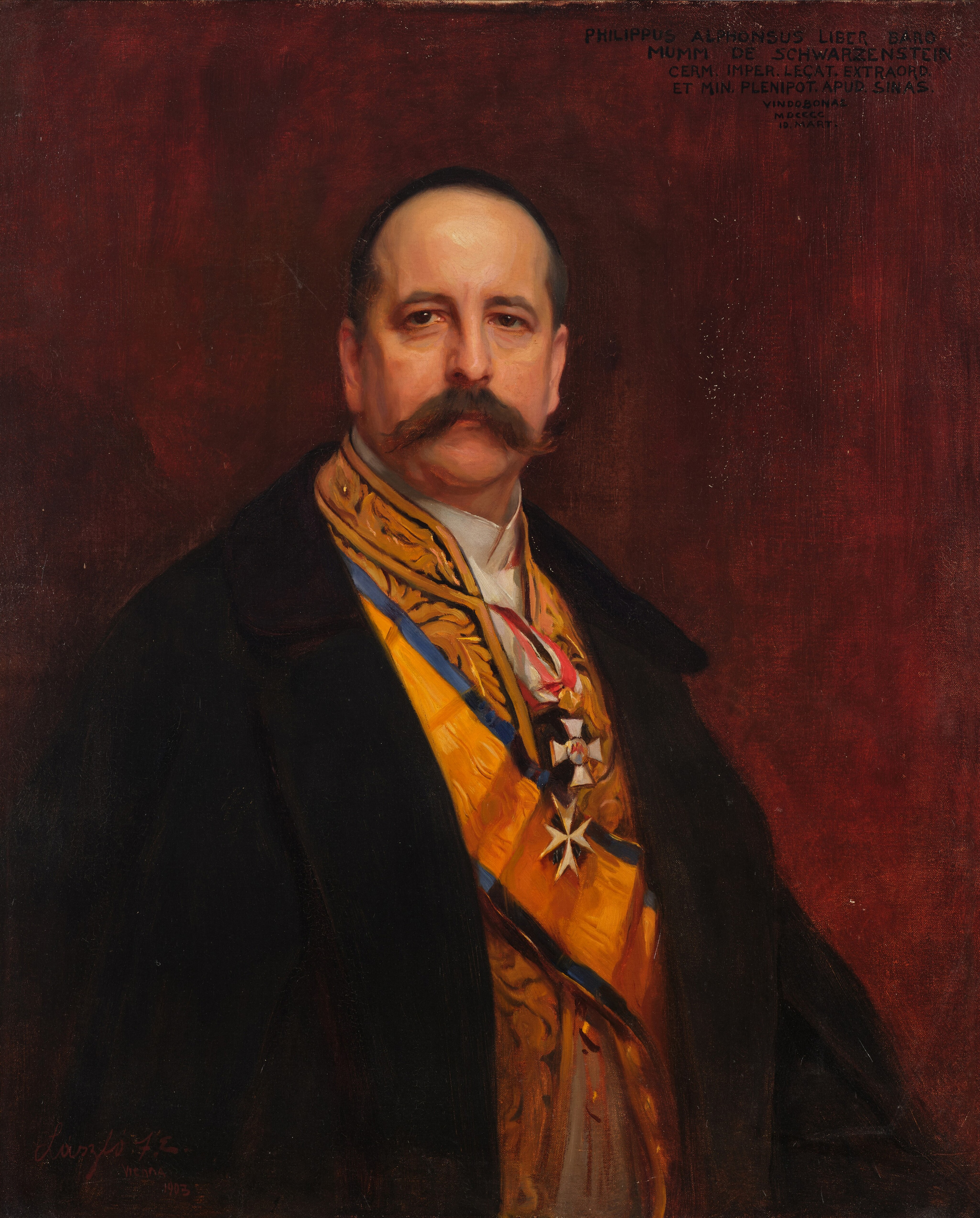
Alfons Mumm von Schwarzenstein (1903) by Philip de László

Mumm von Schwarzenstein was ennobled as a Freiherr (Baron) in the 1903 Birthday Honours list of Emperor Wilhelm II.

In 1911, he bought and restored a medieval castle in the small village of Portofino, Italy, where he eventually retired in 1920 with his Scottish wife Jeannie von Mumm. During the Second World War his then-widow Jeannie is now considered "the saviour" of Portofino because she persuaded Lieutenant Ernst Reimers not to ignite the charges the Germans planned to detonate during their retreat from the village.

Baron Mumm von Schwartzenstein died on his Italian estate at Portofino on 10 July 1924.

== Works ==
- Ein Tagebuch in Bildern (1902), private print scanned by Tōyō Bunko exlibris George Ernest Morrison
- Kriegslyrik (1914–18) in several volumes printed privately
- Mein ligurisches Heim (in Portofino). Mit Freunden für Freunde zusammengestellt und nach eigenen Aufnahmen illustrirt. (private print). Berlin 1915.

Diplomatic posts
Preceded by Viktor Henckel von Donnersmarck	German Ambassador to Luxembourg; 1898–1899	Succeeded by Heinrich von Tschirschky
Preceded by Clemens von Ketteler	German Minister to China; 1900–1905	Succeeded by Arthur von Rex
Preceded by Friedrich Carl von Erckert	German Ambassador to Japan; 1906–1911	Succeeded by Arthur von Rex
Preceded by post created	German Ambassador to Ukraine; 1918	Succeeded by Johannes Graf von Berchem
