= Embassy of Germany, Moscow =

Coordinates: 55°43′02.5″N 37°31′01.2″E

Embassy of Germany, Moscow

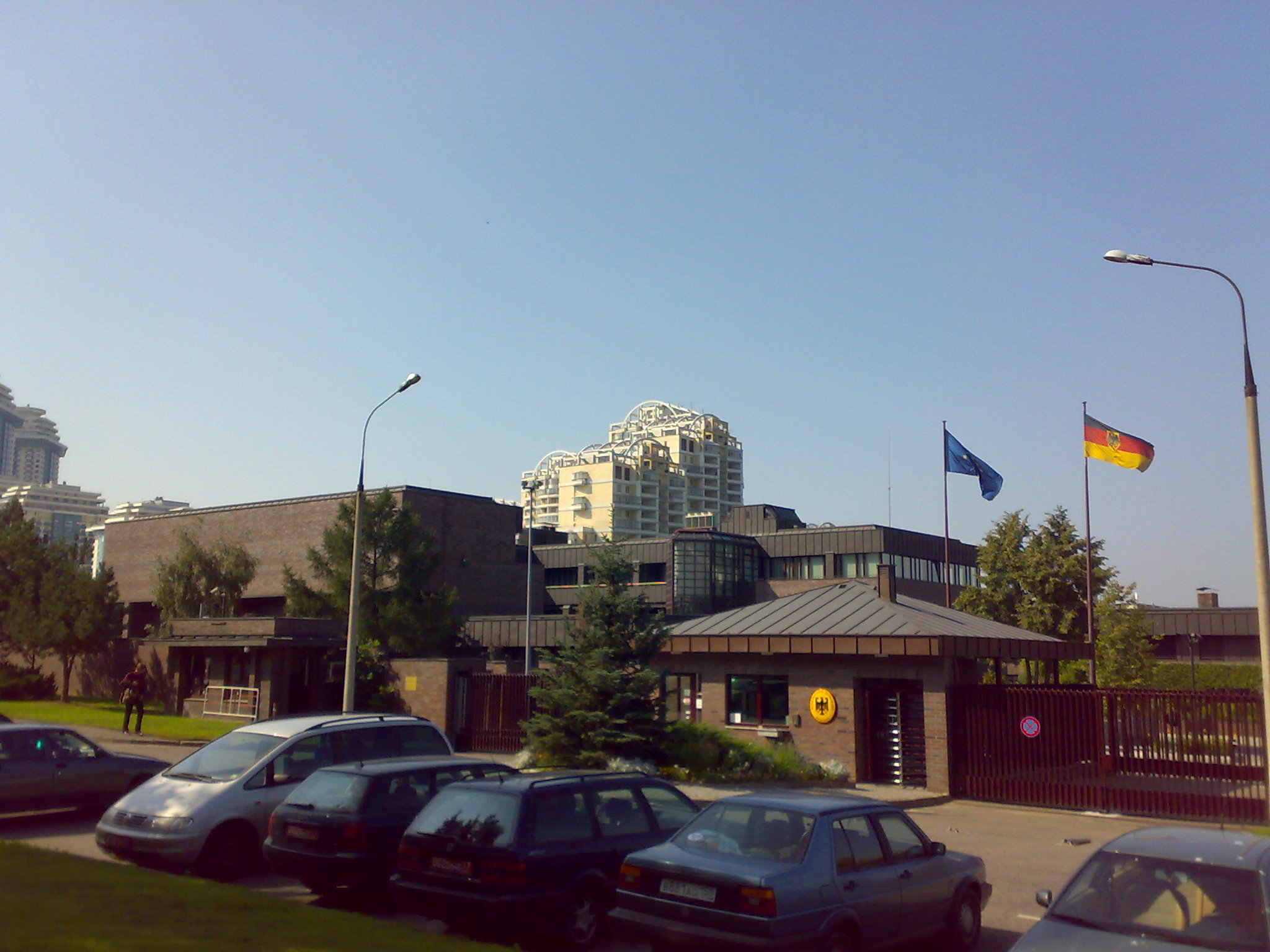
- Location: Moscow
- Ambassador: Géza Andreas von Geyr

The Embassy of the Federal Republic of Germany in Moscow is the chief diplomatic mission of Germany in the Russian Federation. It is located at 56 Mosfilmovskaya Street (Russian: Мосфильмовская ул., 56) in the Ramenki District of Moscow.

== See also ==
- Germany–Russia relations
- Embassy of Germany in Saint Petersburg
- Diplomatic missions in Russia
- List of ambassadors of Germany to Russia
- Embassy of Russia, Berlin
