= Eugen Ott (ambassador) =

German Nazi military attaché to Japan

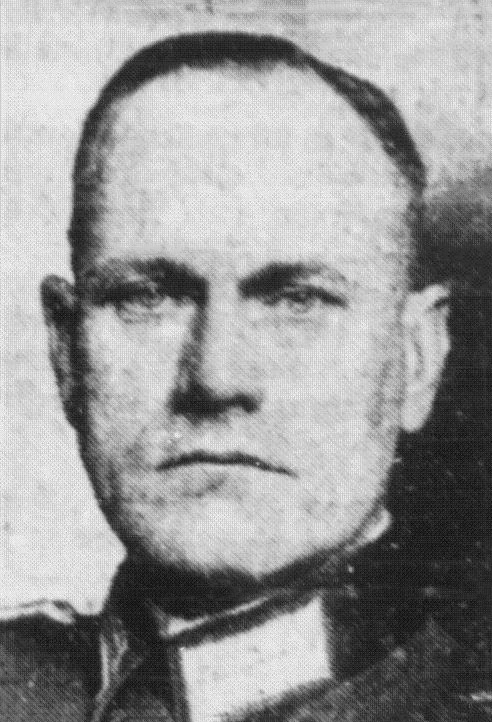
- Eugen Ott as Oberstleutnant (c. 1933)
- Born: 8 April 1889; Rottenburg, Kingdom of Württemberg, German Empire
- Died: 23 January 1977 (aged 87); Tutzing, Upper Bavaria, West Germany
- Relatives: Helma Bodewig (wife); 2 children
- Military career
- Allegiance: German Empire (to 1918); Weimar Republic (to 1933); Nazi Germany
- Branch: Army
- Service years: 1907–1951
- Rank: Generalmajor
- Conflicts: World War I; World War II

Eugen Ott (8 April 1889 – 22 January 1977) was the German ambassador to Japan during the early years of World War II who was notably deceived and compromised by Soviet spy Richard Sorge.

== Early career ==
During World War I, Ott served with distinction on the Eastern Front as an officer with the 26th (Württemberg) Infantry Division. His commander was General Wilhelm von Urach, who was elected king of Lithuania in 1918 as Mindaugas II of Lithuania.

Before Adolf Hitler came to power in Germany (1933), Ott had been the adjutant of General Kurt von Schleicher.

== In Japan ==
In 1934, Ott was sent to Tokyo as military attaché at the German embassy.

In early September 1940, Heinrich Georg Stahmer arrived in Tokyo to assist Ott in negotiating the Tripartite Pact with Japan. Stahmer later replaced Ott as ambassador when Richard Sorge, who had been working for Ott in Japan as an agent for the Abwehr, was unmasked as a Soviet spy in Japan in late 1941.

Prange suggests in his analysis of Sorge that Sorge was so entirely trusted by Ott that he was allowed access to top secret cables from Berlin in the embassy. That trust was the main foundation for Sorge's success as a Red Army spy.

== Later career ==
Ott left Tokyo and went to Peking, China, for the rest of the war. His son Podwick died in Stalingrad.

== See also ==
- German-Japanese relations

Diplomatic posts
| Preceded by Herbert von Dirksen | German Ambassador to Japan; 1938-1942 | Succeeded by Heinrich Georg Stahmer |
