= Heinrich Georg Stahmer =

German diplomat and economist (1892–1978)

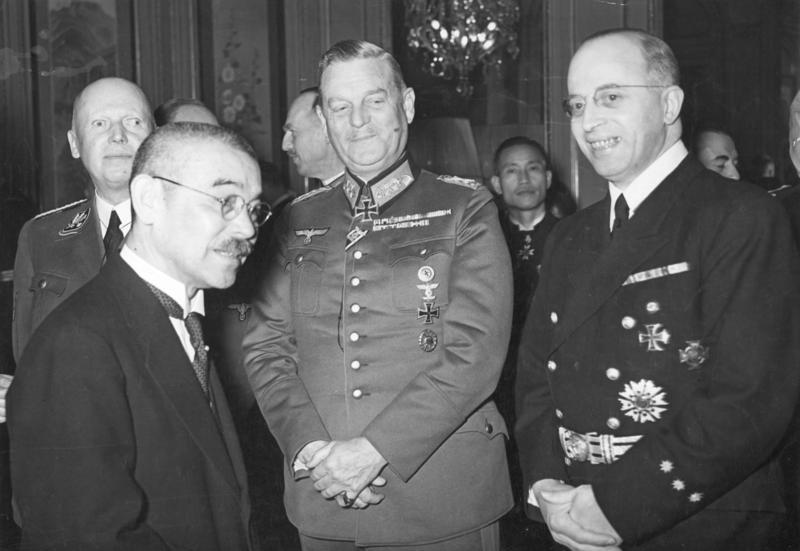
- From left to right: Chief of the Reich Chancellery Hans Lammers, Japanese Foreign Minister Yōsuke Matsuoka, Generalfeldmarschall Wilhelm Keitel and Stahmer at a meeting in Berlin on 28 March 1941.
- Born: 3 May 1892; Hamburg, German Empire
- Died: 13 June 1978 (aged 86); Vaduz, Liechtenstein
- Occupation: Diplomat
- Years active: 1936–1945
- Military career
- Allegiance: German Empire
- Branch: Imperial German Army
- Unit: Luftstreitkräfte
- Conflicts: World War I
- Awards: Iron Cross

Heinrich Georg Stahmer (3 May 1892 in Hamburg, Germany – 13 June 1978 in Vaduz, Liechtenstein) was a German diplomat and economist by training who was in charge of German–Japanese relations at the German Foreign Ministry. He was an aide to Foreign Minister Joachim von Ribbentrop (1938–1940), special envoy to Japan and ambassador to the pro-Japanese Reorganized National Government of China in occupied Nanjing (1940–1943), before becoming German Ambassador to Japan (1943–1945).

A native of Hamburg, Stahmer fought during World War I and earned both classes of Iron Cross.

== Diplomatic career ==
In 1936, Stahmer took part in the negotiations for the Anti Comintern Pact between the German and the Japanese governments.

Throughout 1940, he worked for a German-Japanese alliance, and on 13 August 1940, he was able to notify the Japanese embassy in Berlin about the decision to conclude such a treaty. In September 1940, he took part in the negotiations leading to the conclusion of the Tripartite Pact. After the conclusion of the pact, Stahmer was sent to his next mission in Tokyo.

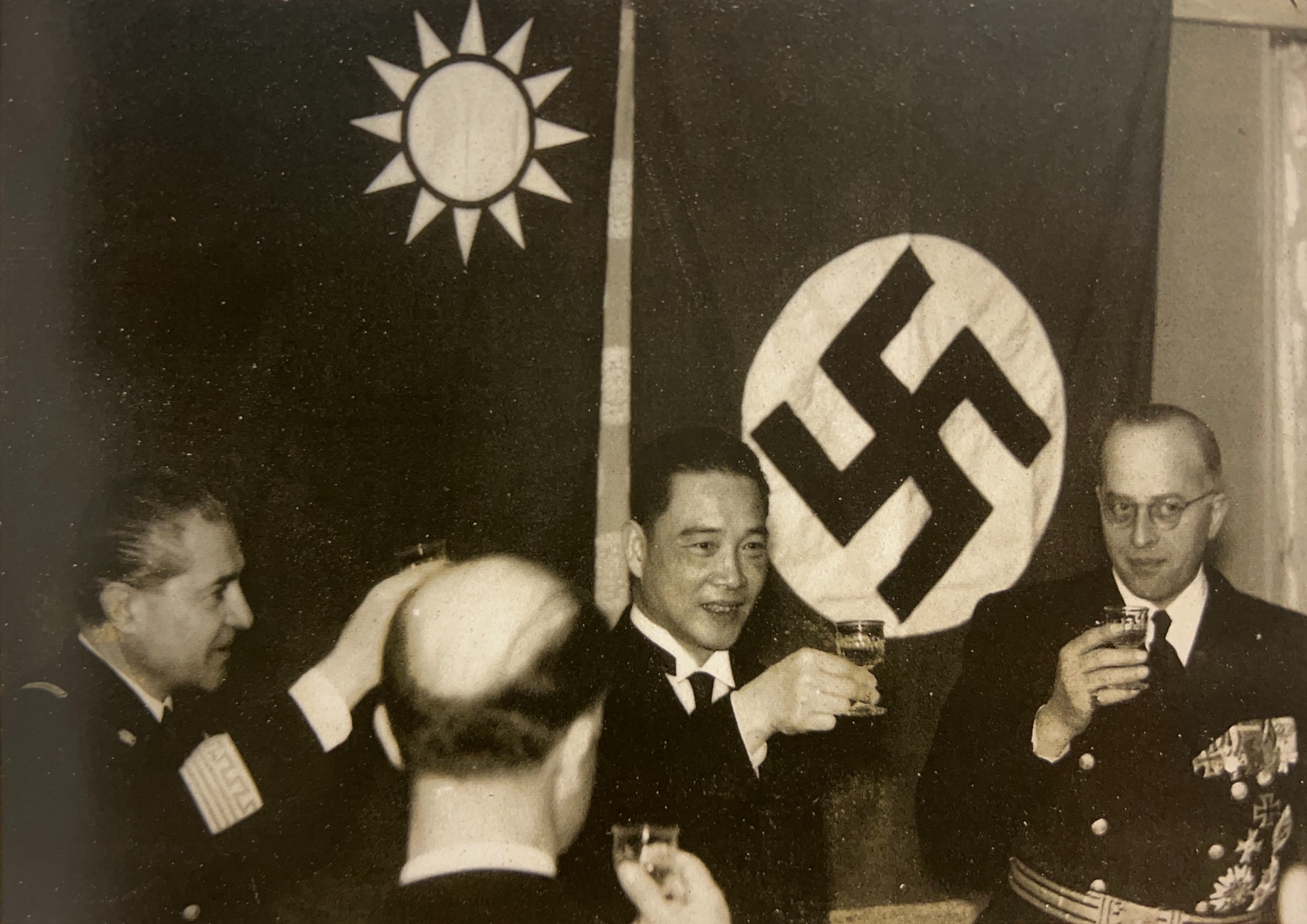
Stahmer with Wang Jingwei, the president of the pro-Japanese Nanjing regime.

In October 1941, Stahmer was appointed as German ambassador to the collaborationist Chinese reorganised national government under Wang Jingwei, established in Nanjing by the Japanese occupation, and remained in that position until late 1942. According to Japanese diplomatic cables, Stahmer was "excited" for his new posting as ambassador to China, a posting that was confirmed by Hitler, and that he would seek to act in accordance with the interests of both Germany and Japan during his tenure in China.

In January 1943, he was appointed ambassador to Japan, and arrived in Tokyo from Nanjing on 28 January 1943. He remained in that position until the end of the war.

On 5 May 1945, as the German surrender was approaching, Stahmer was handed an official protest by Japanese Foreign Minister Shigenori Togo, accusing the German government of betraying its Japanese ally. After the surrender of the German government, the Japanese government broke off diplomatic relations with the German Reich on 15 May 1945, and Stahmer was interned and kept under arrest in the Fujiya Hotel in Hakone near Tokyo until the surrender of Japan in August 1945.

== Postwar activities ==
On 10 September 1945, following the Japanese surrender, he was placed under arrest by US authorities in Sugamo Prison in Tokyo, and in September 1947, he was returned to Germany, where he was interned until September 1948. It is not clear how he was treated during the denazification process initiated by the Allied occupation authorities.

After his release, Stahmer became involved in business with Japanese companies. In 1952, he visited Japan for commercial purposes and wrote a book about doing business in postwar Japan. He died in 1978 at Vaduz, Liechtenstein.

== Works ==
- Japans Niederlage – Asiens Sieg: Aufstieg eines Grösseren Ostasien (Japan's Defeat – Asia's Victory: Rise of a Greater East Asia), Bielefeld: Deutscher Heimat-Verlag, Bielefeld 1952

Diplomatic posts
Preceded by Eugen Ott	German Ambassador to Japan; 1943–1945	Succeeded by position terminated following German surrender
Preceded by Recognition transferred to the Nanjing regime Oskar Trautmann (Chiang Kai-shek's government)	German Ambassador to China (Nanjing regime); 1941–1943	Succeeded by Ernst Wörmann
