= The International Legal Foundation =

The International Legal Foundation (ILF) is an international non-governmental organization founded in 2001 (25 years ago). It is focused on establishing and strengthening criminal legal aid systems around the world. In addition to its technical assistance work with foreign governments, the ILF provides direct legal aid services through its multiple in-country offices. To date, ILF lawyers have defended more than 60,000 accused individuals worldwide.

== Founding ==
While serving as an observer to the Rwandan genocide trials, attorney Natalie Rea noticed there were "a handful" defense lawyers available to represent the over 70,000 incarcerated at Kigali Central Prison. She returned home to the United States and founded Legal Aid Rwanda, which recruited lawyers to travel to Rwanda and provide pretrial defense. In 2001, Rea founded the International Legal Foundation. Rea created the ILF to address legal aid crises in foreign countries, and expand criminal defense services for the indigent. She served as its executive director until 2012, when she was succeeded by current director Jennifer Smith. According to its website, Rea now serves as a senior advisor on its board of directors.

== Programs and work abroad ==
The majority of ILF programs and staff are located outside of the United States, primarily in its program countries. The ILF has six primary areas of focus: legal aid access; pretrial justice reform; gender equality; racial, ethnic and religious minorities; children and youth; and the UN SDG16+ framework. The ILF hires lawyers local to each country of operation and trains them in legal aid best practices. ILF staff members work with governments globally, sharing their expertise to promote criminal justice reform. Coordination of all programs is carried out from its US Headquarters, which are located in New York City. Its year-round international fellowship program stations experienced defense lawyers from around the world in program countries, to train ILF lawyers in criminal defense and provide additional support to the legal aid office.

=== Country offices ===
ILF programs are currently active in Afghanistan, Myanmar, Nepal, Tunisia, and the West Bank.

The ILF was first established in Afghanistan in 2003, and has expanded its practice to 22 provinces. According to its website, it has provided legal aid services on more than 56,000 cases in the country. In 2019, The Washington Post published an article about ILF client Brishna, who was accused of murdering her son. In that same year, the ILF launched a partnership with Afghanistan's Ministry of Justice (MoJ) to expand the reach of legal aid and accelerate progress in achieving UN Sustainable Development Goal 16, justice for all. Also in 2019, the ILF won the first annual Rule of Law Competition, hosted by the United Rule of Law Appeal (UROLA), for its work in Afghanistan.

The ILF started operating in Myanmar in 2017, where it is active in five regions and staff have worked on more than 300 cases. In 2019, it partnered with UNICEF Myanmar to support the implementation of the Child Rights Law, connecting young people with juvenile defense lawyers.

The ILF began work in Nepal in 2008, where it has worked on an estimated 7,500 cases across five districts. In 2017, the Nepal program became locally led, and was independently registered as the Public Defender Society of Nepal (PDS-Nepal).

The ILF began work in the West Bank in 2010, opening its first office in Ramallah. According to its website, staff have worked on more than 4,000 cases across 11 governorates.

The ILF began its program in Tunisia in 2015. In 2020, the Tunis office took on its 500th case.

=== United Nations ===
The ILF works alongside United Nations agencies in a number of ways. The ILF actively participates in the UN Commission on Crime Prevention and Criminal Justice, and retains consultative status with the United Nations Economic and Social Council (ECOSOC).

=== International Legal Aid Conference ===
In 2014, the ILF co-founded the biennial International Conference on Access to Legal Aid in Criminal Justice Systems (ILAC) with the Open Society Justice Initiative (OSJI), the United Nations Development Programme (UNDP), and the United Nations Office on Drugs and Crime (UNODC). The conference highlights "global efforts to implement the United Nations Principles and Guidelines on Access to Legal Aid in Criminal Justice Systems, which provide that States should put in place a comprehensive legal aid system." ILAC has been held in the following locations: Johannesburg, South Africa (2014), Buenos Aires, Argentina (2016), and Tbilisi, Georgia (2018). The 4th ILAC is scheduled to be held in Rio de Janeiro, Brazil, in September 2020.
