= List of ambassadors of Germany to Japan =

The following is a list of German ministers, envoys and ambassadors to Japan

Inaugural date	Official Position (Japanese)	Official Position	Name
January 19, 1863	領事	Consul	Max August Scipio von Brandt
February 2, 1867	代理公使	Chargé d'affaires	Max August Scipio von Brandt
July 20, 1868	総領事	Consul general	Max August Scipio von Brandt
January 5, 1869	代理公使	Chargé d'affaires	Max August Scipio von Brandt
June 1871	代理公使	Chargé d'affaires	Theodor von Holleben
March 30, 1873	弁理公使	Chargé d'affaires	Max August Scipio von Brandt
February 1875	代理公使	Chargé d'affaires	Eduard Zappe
April 1875	代理公使	Chargé d'affaires	Theodor von Holleben
December 3, 1875	弁理公使	Chargé d'affaires	Karl von Eisendecher
April 1878	代理公使	Chargé d'affaires	Felix Freiherr von Gutschmid
June 14, 1880	特命全権公使	Minister Plenipotentiary	Karl von Eisendecher
April 24, 1880	特命全権公使	Minister Plenipotentiary	Otto Graf von Dönhoff
March 11, 1886	特命全権公使	Minister Plenipotentiary	Theodor von Holleben
December 10, 1892	特命全権公使	Minister Plenipotentiary	Felix Freiherr von Gutschmid
March 3, 1897	臨時代理公使	Chargé d'affaires ad interim	Karl Georg von Treuter
March 29, 1898	特命全権公使	Minister Plenipotentiary	Kasimir Graf von Leyden
May 23, 1900	臨時代理公使	Chargé d'affaires ad interim	Georg von Wedel
May 10, 1901	特命全権公使	Minister Plenipotentiary	Emmerich Graf von Arco Valley
February 28, 1906	臨時代理公使	Chargé d'affaires ad interim	Friedrich Carl von Erckert
May 22, 1906	特命全権大使	Ambassador	Alfons Mumm von Schwarzenstein
April 19, 1911	特命全権大使	Ambassador	Arthur Graf Rex
August 1914			
August 1, 1920	代理大使	Chargé d'affaires	Wilhelm Solf
February 26, 1921	特命全権大使	Ambassador	Wilhelm Solf
December 16, 1928	臨時代理大使	Chargé d'affaires ad interim	Wilhelm Albrecht von Schoen
January 1, 1929	特命全権大使	Ambassador	Ernst Arthur Voretzsch
December 1933	臨時代理大使	Chargé d'affaires ad interim	Willy Eduard Noebel
December 27, 1933	特命全権大使	Ambassador	Herbert von Dirksen
February 1938	臨時代理大使	Chargé d'affaires ad interim	Willy Eduard Noebel
April 28, 1938	特命全権大使	Ambassador	Eugen Ott
February 4, 1943	特命全権大使	Ambassador	Heinrich Georg Stahmer
May 1945			
April 28, 1952	臨時代理大使	Chargé d'affaires ad interim	Heinrich Northe
May 19, 1955	特命全権大使	Ambassador	Hans Kroll
May 13, 1958	特命全権大使	Ambassador	Wilhelm Haas
September 10, 1961	臨時代理大使	Chargé d'affaires ad interim	F. van Briessen
March 10, 1962	特命全権大使	Ambassador	Herbert Dittmann
January 19, 1965	臨時代理大使	Chargé d'affaires ad interim	Walter Boss
March 18, 1966	特命全権大使	Ambassador	Franz Krapf
March 26, 1971	臨時代理大使	Chargé d'affaires ad interim	Heinrich Rohreke
April 5, 1971	特命全権大使	Ambassador	Wilhelm Grewe
October 9, 1976	臨時代理大使	Chargé d'affaires ad interim	Hartmut Schulze-Boysen
March 23, 1977	特命全権大使	Ambassador	Günter O. Diehl
April 20, 1981	特命全権大使	Ambassador	Klaus W. G. Blech
July 10, 1984	特命全権大使	Ambassador	Walter Boss
October 22, 1986	特命全権大使	Ambassador	Hans-Joachim Hallier
September 28, 1990	特命全権大使	Ambassador	Wilhelm Haas
July 11, 1994	特命全権大使	Ambassador	Heinrich-Dietrich Dieckmann
September 22, 1997	特命全権大使	Ambassador	Frank Elbe
September 22, 1999	特命全権大使	Ambassador	Uwe Kästner
December 22, 2001	特命全権大使	Ambassador	Henrik Schmiegelow
July 1, 2006	特命全権大使	Ambassador	Hans-Joachim Daerr
October 21, 2010	特命全権大使	Ambassador	Volker Stanzel
April 9, 2014	特命全権大使	Ambassador	Hans Carl von Werthern
September 1, 2019	特命全権大使	Ambassador	Ina Lepel
September 1, 2021	特命全権大使	Ambassador	Clemens von Goetze

== Sources ==
- Nihon Kingendaishi Jiten, "Dictionary of Modern and Present Japanese History" (Tôyô Keizai Shinpôsha, 1978)
- Nihon Gaikoshi Jiten, "Dictionary of Japanese Diplomatic History" (Tokyo: Yamakawa Shuppansha, 1992)
- Website of the German embassy in Japan
- Website of the Japanese embassy in Germany

== See also ==
- Japanese Ministers, Envoys and Ambassadors to Germany
- Germany–Japan relations
- Diplomatic rank
