= Patricia Flor =

German diplomat (born 1961)

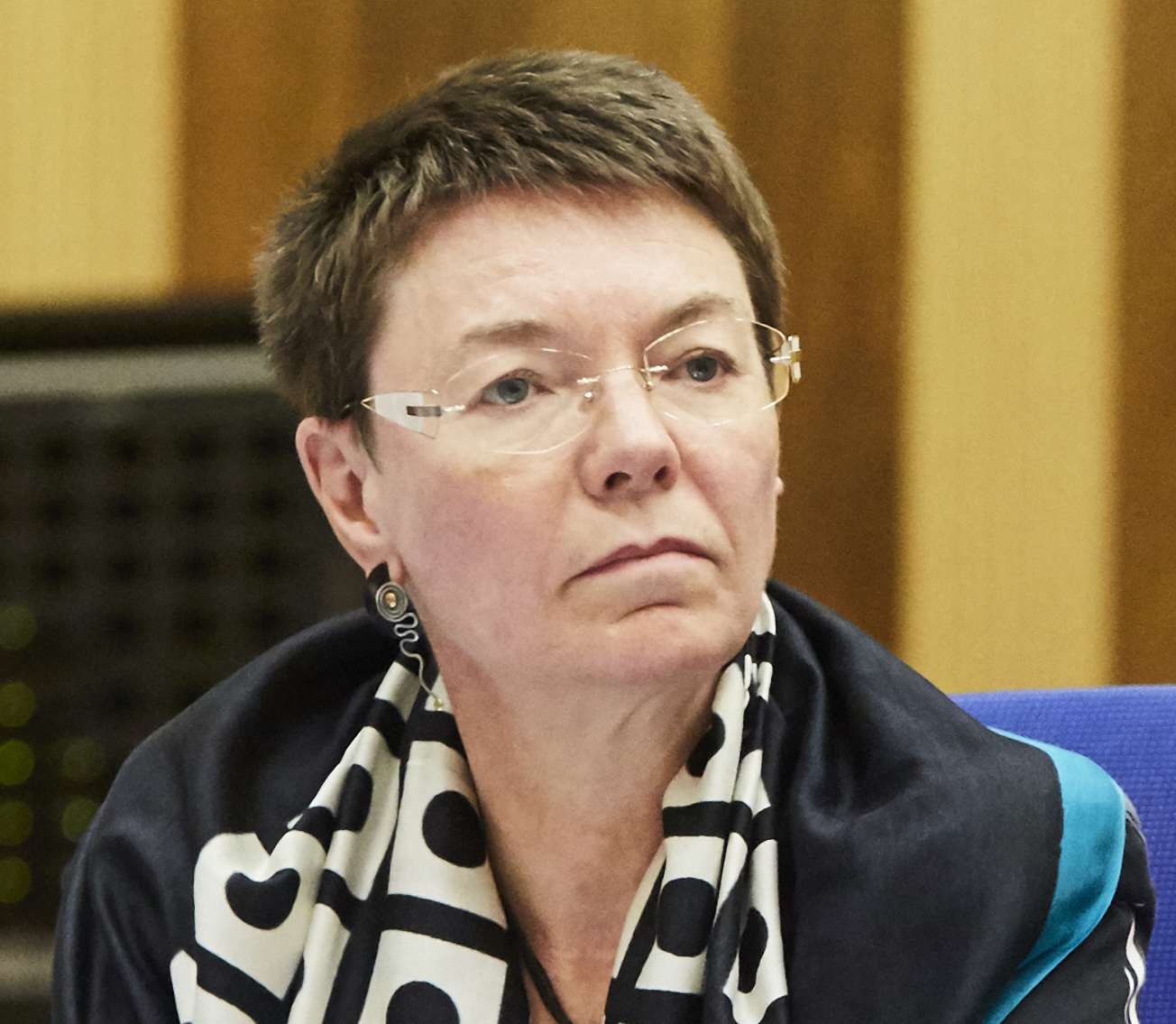
Patricia Flor (cropped)

Patricia Hildegard Flor (born 19 October 1961; Nuremberg, Germany) is a German diplomat who is Ambassador of Germany to Brazil since September 2026. Previously, she has been Ambassador of Germany to China since July 2022. She has also served as the European Union’s Special Representative (EUSR) for Central Asia and as German ambassador to Georgia. Furthermore she served in Kazakhstan and at the Permanent Mission to the United Nations in New York. She presented her diplomatic credentials to the Emperor of Japan on November 22, 2018 as Ambassador of the European Union (EU) to Japan. She came to that position after having been the German Federal Government Commissioner for Disarmament and Arms Control in Berlin from 2015 to 2018.

Besides her native German, Flor is fluent in English, Russian and French.

Before joining the foreign service in 1992, Flor worked as a journalist. Flor is married.

== Education ==
Flor has a Ph.D. from the University of Erlangen-Nuremberg, as well as a master’s in public administration from Harvard University John F. Kennedy School of Government. From 1985 to 1987, Flor was an undergraduate student at the University of Bamberg studying History, Philosophy and Slavonic Studies.
