= List of ambassadors of Germany to the Netherlands =

Ambassador of Germany to the Netherlands
- Deutscher Botschafter im Königreich der Niederlande
- Incumbent; Cyril Nunn since September 2021
- Residence: London
- Inaugural holder: Wilhelm von Perponcher-Sedlnitzky
- Formation: 1871

List of German ambassadors in the Kingdom of the Netherlands.

== Envoys of the German states ==
=== Envoys of Baden ===
==== Margraviate of Baden ====
- 1709–1713: Hermann von Petkum; Resident
- 1719–1723: Henry Charles des Bordes; Resident
- 1725–1725: Abel Rotholf de la Devèze; Resident
- 1747–1780: Gottlieb Heinrich von Treuer; Resident, from 1776 Resident Minister
- 1781–1795: George François de Bosset; chargé d'affaires

==== Grand Duchy of Baden ====
- 1806–1810: George François de Bosset; Resident Minister
- 1866–1871: Gustav von Bohlen Halbach

=== Envoys of Bavaria ===
- 1690–1692: Corbinian von Prielmayer; Minister Plenipotentiary
- 1692–1692: Don Balthazar de Fuenmayor y la Sazon; charge d'affaires
- 1695–1697: Corbinian von Prielmayer von Priel; Envoy Extraordinary, from 1697 Minister Plenipotentiary
- 1698–1702: Johann Baptist von Lancier; Resident
- 1714–1717: Baron von Heydenfeldt, Envoy
- 1721–1741: Jacob Anthon van Gansinot; Resident, from 1729 Envoy Extraordinary
- 1742–1755: Petrus van Elsacker; Resident, from 1751 Envoy Extraordinary
- 1755–1785: Jacob Olivier von Cornet (1710-1785); Resident, from 1769 Envoy Extraordinary
- 1786–1787: Arnold Joseph Polis; charge d'affaires
- 1787–1806: Franciscus Antonius van Willingen (b. 1738); charge d'affaires
- 1807–1810: Friedrich Wilhelm von Hertling; Envoy Extraordinary and Minister Plenipotentiary
- 1810–1814: Break in relations due to annexation by France
- 1815–1824: Friedrich August von Gise
- 1869–1870: Joseph von Sigmund

=== Envoys of Prussia ===
- 1648: establishment of diplomatic relations
- 1651–1661: Daniel Weimann
- 1672–1675: Gerhard Bernhard von Pölnitz
- 1746–1746: Christoph Heinrich von Ammon
- 1814–1816: Karl Christian von Brockhausen
- 1817–1823: Franz Ludwig von Hatzfeldt
- 1823–1824: Peter Heinrich August von Salviati
- 1825–1827: Friedrich Heinrich Leopold von Schladen
- 1827–1828: Ludwig of Waldburg-Truchsess
- 1829–1830: August Ludwig Schoultz von Ascheraden
- 1830–1834: Mortimer von Maltzan
- 1835–1842: Hermann Friedrich von Wylich und Lottum
- 1842–1861: Hans von Königsmarck
- 1862–1863: Alphonse von Oriola
- 1863–1874: Wilhelm von Perponcher-Sedlnitzky

=== Envoys of Saxony ===
- 1649: establishment of diplomatic relations

==== Electorate of Saxony ====
- 1649–1664: Martin Tancke
- 1668–1683: vacant
- 1683–1683: Albrecht Friedrich von Hünicke; Envoy Extraordinary
- 1683–1685: Emanuel Willius; chargé d'affaires
- 1685–1691: vacant
- 1691–1692: Wolf Abraham von Gersdorff; Envoy Extraordinary
- 1693–1694: Otto Heinrich von Friesen; Envoy Extraordinary
- 1697–1719: Wolf Abraham von Gersdorff; Envoy Extraordinary
- 1697–1698: Christoph Dietrich von Bose the Younger; Envoy Extraordinary
- 1707–1710: Peter Robert Taparelli von Lagnasco; Envoy Extraordinary
- 1710–1713: Georg Graf von Werthern; Minister Plenipotentiary
- 1719–1721: Philipp von Stosch
- 1721–1750: Claude de Brosse; Minister Plenipotentiary and Ambassador
- 1750–1750: Johann Arnold Ernst; chargé d'affaires
- 1750–1766: Johann Heinrich Kauderbach; Resident, from 1759 Minister
- 1766–1780: Jean Pierre Isaaq Dubois; chargé d'affaires
- 1779–1791: Karl Wilhelm von Martens; chargé d'affaires

==== Kingdom of Saxony ====
- 1830–1832: Karl von Einsiedel; Resident in Munich
- 1832–1862: vacant
- 1862–1874: Oswald von Fabrice; Resident in Brussels

=== Envoys of Württemberg ===
- 1787: Establishment of diplomatic relations

==== Duchy of Württemberg ====
- 1787–1798: Hauptmann von Penasse; chargé d'affaires
- 1798–1799: Contamine; chargé d'affaires
- 1799–1803: Johann Christian Friedrich von Hügel; Resident Minister

==== Electorate of Württemberg ====
- 1803–1805: Johann Christian Friedrich von Hügel; Resident Minister

==== Kingdom of Württemberg ====
- 1807–1807: Johann Chévalier von Harmensen; Envoy Extraordinary and Minister Plenipotentiary
- 1807–1808: Christoph Erdmann von Steube; Envoy Extraordinary and Minister Plenipotentiary
- 1808–1808: Friedrich Eckbrecht von Dürckheim-Montmartin, Envoy Extraordinary and Minister Plenipotentiary
- 1808–1810: Christoph Erdmann von Steube; Envoy Extraordinary and Minister Plenipotentiary
- 1810–1814: Break in relations
- 1814–1815: Friedrich August Gremp von Freudenstein; Envoy Extraordinary and Minister Plenipotentiary
- 1815–1839: August von Wächter; Consul-General, chargé d'affaires, Resident Minister
- 1843: Woellwarth von Reinhardt; Resident Minister
- 1844–1848: Baron von Pfeil; Resident Minister
- 1848: Dissolution of the legation

== Ambassadors of Germany ==
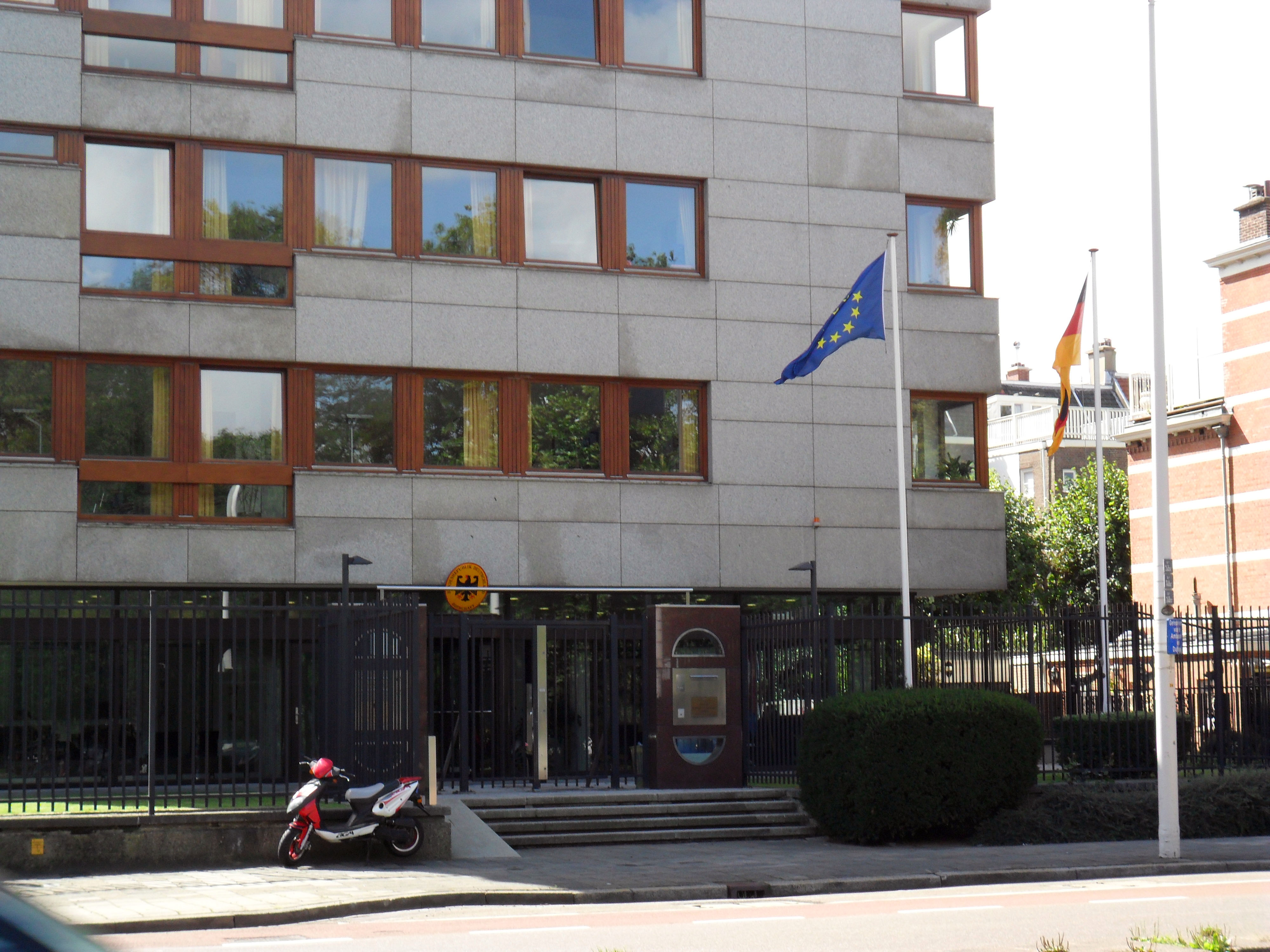
Embassy of Germany in The Hague

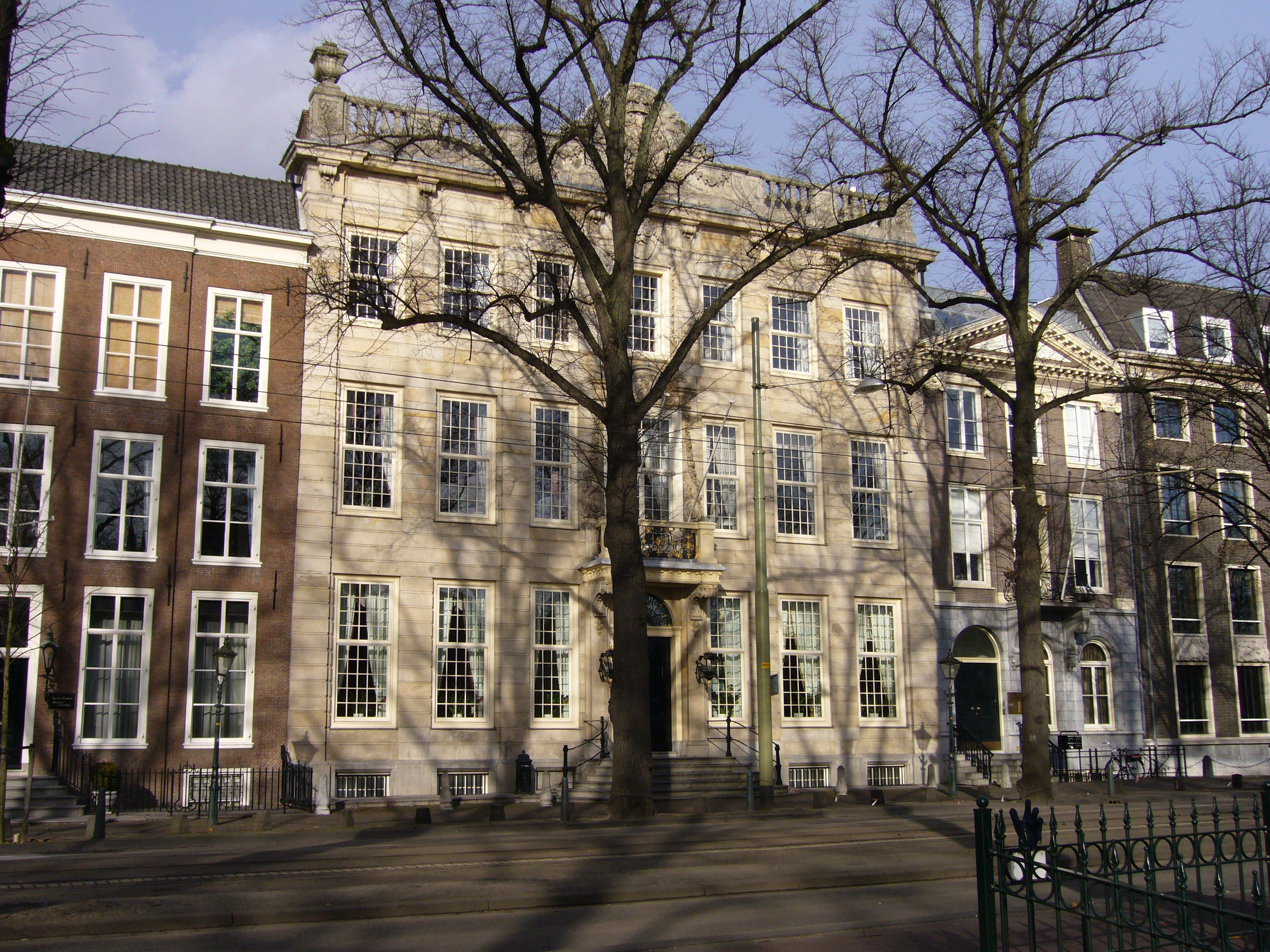
Huis Schuylenburch, residence of the German Ambassador in The Hague

=== North German Confederation (1867–1871) ===
- 1868–1871: Wilhelm von Perponcher-Sedlnitzky

=== German Reich (1871–1945) ===
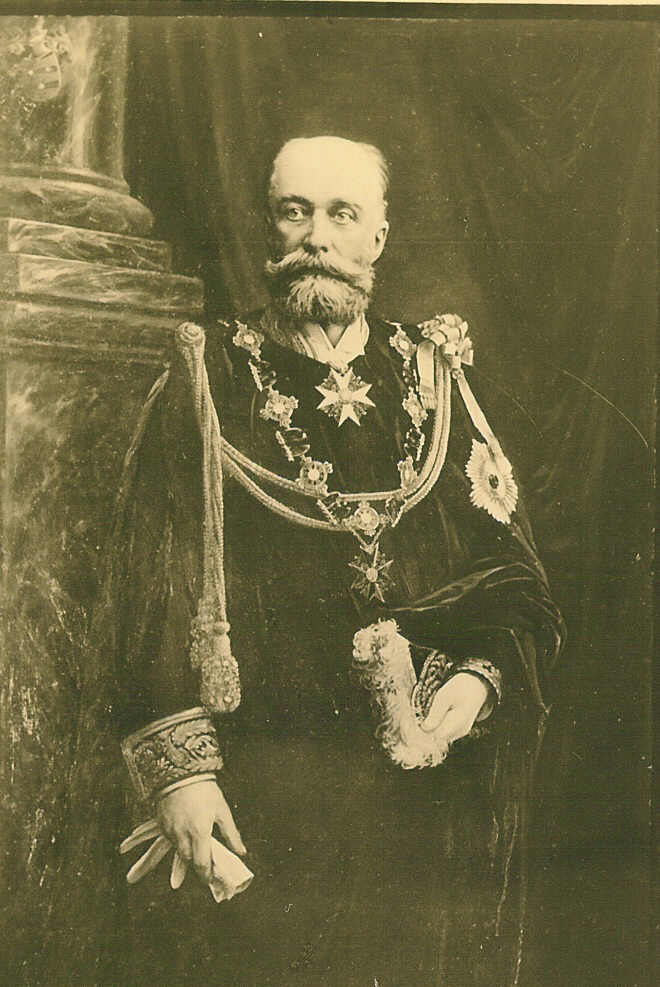
Count Friedrich Johann von Alvensleben

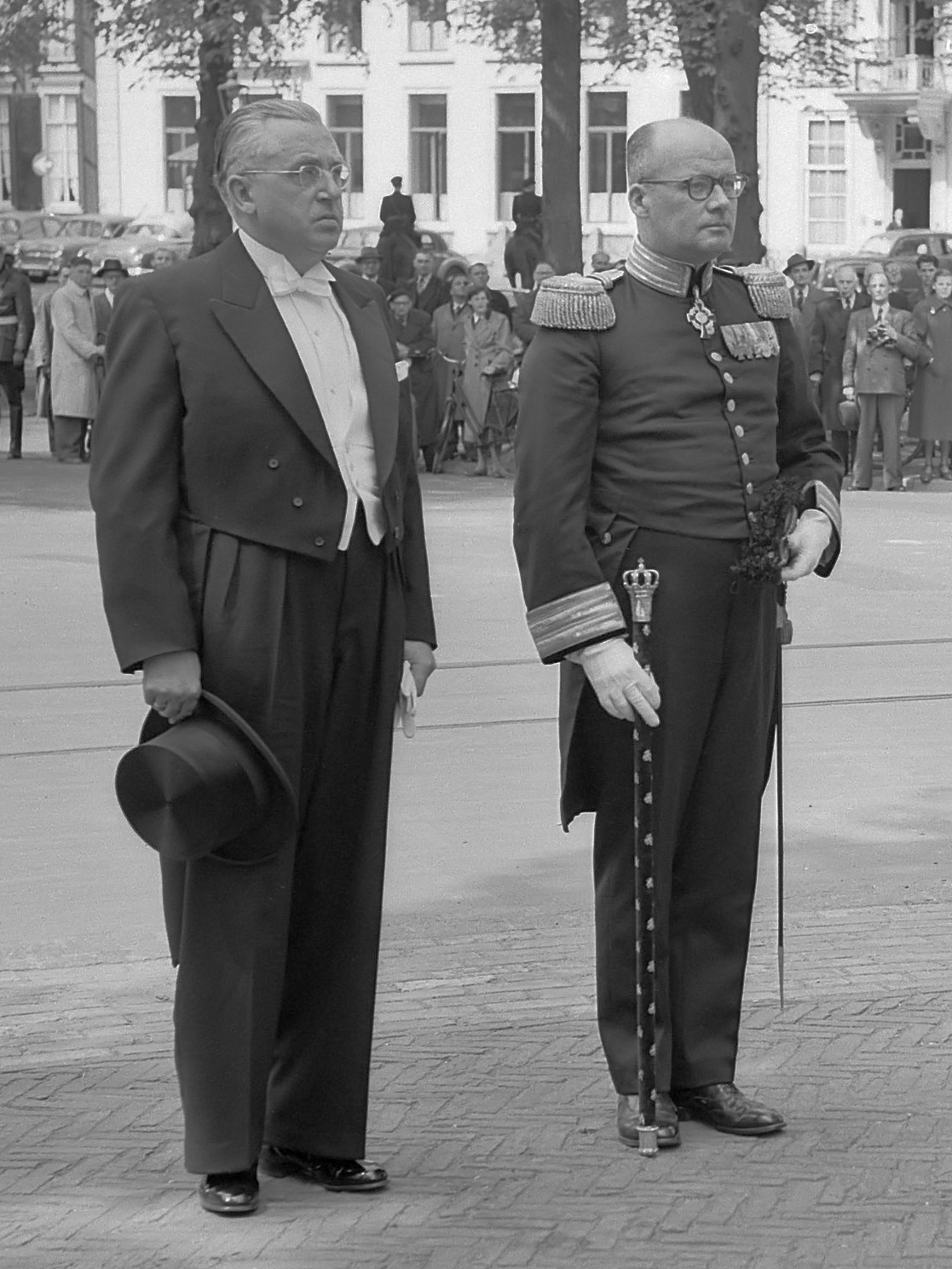
Ambassador Mühlenfeld (left) being received by Queen Juliana of the Netherlands, 12 May 1953.

==== German Empire (1871–1918) ====
- 1871–1874: Wilhelm von Perponcher-Sedlnitzky
- 1874–1882: Julius von Canitz und Dallwitz
- 1882–1884: Friedrich Johann von Alvensleben
- 1885–1891: Anton Saurma von der Jeltsch
- 1891–1895: Kuno zu Rantzau
- 1895–1899: Egon von den Brincken
- 1899–1902: Friedrich Pourtales
- 1902–1907: Karl von Schlözer
- 1908–1915: Felix von Müller
- 1915–1916: Richard von Kuhlmann
- 1916–1918: Frederick Rosen

==== Weimar Republic (1919–1933) ====
- 1918–1921: Frederick Rosen
- 1921–1927: Hellmuth Lucius von Stoedten
- 1928–1933: Julius von Zech Burkersroda

==== Nazi Germany (1933–1945) ====
- 1933–1940: Julius von Zech Burkersroda
- 1940–1945: Otto Bene

diplomatic relations disrupted due to World War II

=== Federal Republic of Germany ===
- 1950–1952: Karl du Mont
- 1952–1953: Werner von Holleben
- 1953–1958: Hans Mühlenfeld
- 1958–1963: Josef Löns
- 1963–1965: Hans Berger
- 1965–1968: Karl Hermann Knoke
- 1968–1972: Hans Arnold
- 1972–1976: Adolf Max Obermayer
- 1976–1979: Herbert Turner
- 1980–1983: Gerhard Fischer
- 1983–1990: Otto von der Gablentz
- 1990–1994: Klaus-Jürgen Citron
- 1994–1996: Wilhelm Haas
- 1996–2001: Eberhard von Puttkamer
- 2001–2006: Edmund Duckwitz
- 2006–2010: Thomas Runner
- 2010–2012: Heinz Peter Behr
- 2012–2016: Franz Joseph Kremp
- 2016–2021: Dirk Brengelmann
- 2021–: Cyril Nunn

== See also ==
- Germany–Netherlands relations
