= Friedrich von Pourtalès =

German aristocrat and diplomat

Count Friedrich von Pourtalès

German Ambassador to the Russian Empire
- In office December 1907 – 1 August 1914
- Preceded by: Wilhelm von Schoen
- Succeeded by: World War I

Personal details
- Born: Jakob Ludwig Friedrich Wilhelm Joachim de Pourtalès; 24 October 1853 Oberhofen am Thunersee, Switzerland
- Died: 3 May 1928 (aged 74) Bad Nauheim, Germany
- Spouse(s): Gisela, Countess von Kanitz
- Parent(s): Wilhelm von Pourtalès; Charlotte, Countess von Maltzan zu Wartenberg und Penzlin

Jakob Ludwig Friedrich Wilhelm Joachim de Pourtalès (24 October 1853 – 3 May 1928) was a German aristocrat and diplomat who served as the Ambassador to the Russian Empire in Saint Petersburg from 1907 to 1914.

== Early life ==
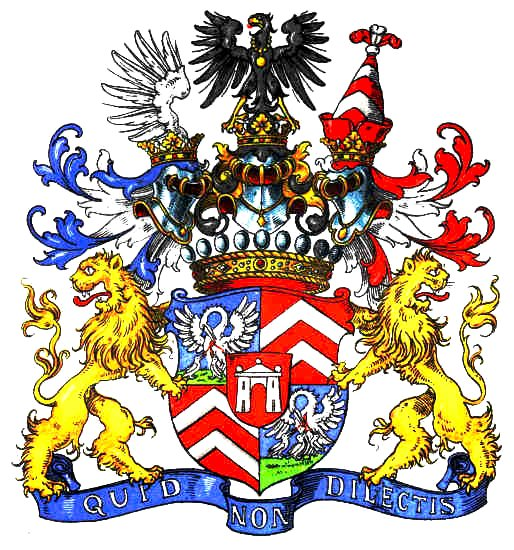
Pourtalès coat of arms

Graf de Pourtalès was born on 24 October 1853. He was a son of Wilhelm von Pourtalès (1815–1889) and Charlotte Luise Auguste Gräfin von Maltzan zu Wartenberg und Penzlin (1827–1861). His maternal grandfather, Count Mortimer von Maltzan, the Foreign Minister of Prussia from 1841 to 1842. His father spent a number of years in Venice creating a collection of Renaissance sculpture, which included works by Jacopo Sansovino and Andrea Riccio, and paintings by old Italian masters. His siblings included Louise de Pourtalès (who died aged 29 in 1879), Johanna Albertine Antoinette de Pourtalès (wife of Bernard von Jagow-Calberwisch) and Rosa Margarete Guillemette Mathilde Auguste von Pourtalès (wife of Moritz von Hohenthal).

Among his extended family were uncles Count Guillaume von Pourtalès and Count Albert von Pourtalès (a member of the Prussian House of Lords who was appointed the Prussian Minister to France by William I and was succeeded by future Chancellor Otto von Bismarck in 1861). His family, who were originally French, were Protestant bankers. The Pourtalès title was created in 1750 by the King of Prussia Frederick II. He was also a cousin of Theobald von Bethmann Hollweg, the Chancellor of the German Empire and Minister President of Prussia from 1907 to 1917. Another cousin was Count James Pourtalès, who previously owned the family estate and went bankrupt in the Panic of 1893.

== Career ==
Formal and informal military and diplomatic connections in 1914 Triple Entente Triple Alliance

Pourtalès was Prussian Minister to the Kingdom of Bavaria in Munich (under Luitpold, Prince Regent of Bavaria) until 1907, and conducted diplomacy in the style of the grand seigneur, holding posts in Austria-Hungary, the Netherlands and France. When Pourtalès arrived in St. Petersburg, he came with seventeen vanloads of furniture.

Pourtalès succeeded Count Monts (Note: Count Anton von Monts served as the German Ambassador to Italy from 1903 to 1908.) as the German Ambassador to the Russian Empire in Saint Petersburg from 1907 (when Russia went into a coalition with Britain and France, known as the Triple Entente, and formed as a counterweight to the Triple Alliance of Germany, Austria-Hungary, and Italy) until the outbreak of World War I in 1914. While Ambassador, Wilhelm von Mirbach served as the embassy clerk.

Pourtalès was deeply involved in the 1914 July Crisis, which was a series of interrelated diplomatic and military escalations among the major powers of Europe in the summer of 1914 that ultimately led to the Great War and started with the assassination of Archduke Franz Ferdinand, heir presumptive to the Austro-Hungarian throne. Pourtalès handed Russia's Foreign Minister Sergey Sazonov Germany's declaration of war. In his obituary, the New York Times wrote that Pourtalès "supported the official German explanation of the cause of the World War. He asserted the innocence of his country and expressed belief that the Czar had been forced into war against his will by the Russian war party. He believed that the surest guarantee of peace would have been an alliance of Germany, Russia and France, which he said the Kaiser and the Czar tried to accomplish. He was one of those who accepted the theory that England had been feverishly pushing a policy of encirclement of the Central Powers."

== Personal life ==
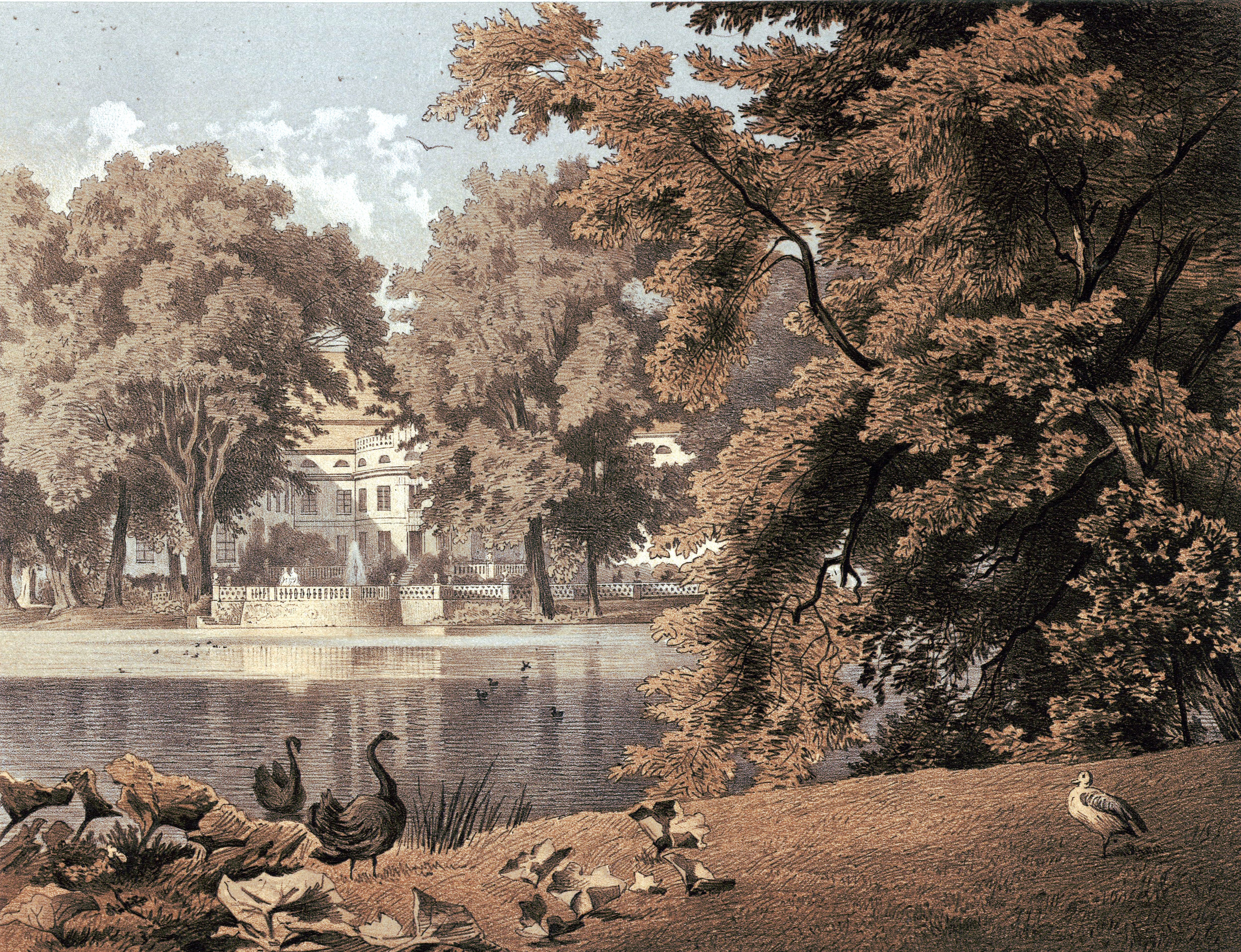
Schloss Glumbowitz

He was married to Gisela Elisabeth Kordelia Maria Charlotte Maximiliane Rahel Josepha Gräfin von Kanitz (1873–1957), the daughter of Georg von Kanitz and Hélène Boniface Pauline Luise Gräfin von Hatzfeldt zu Trachenberg. Her maternal grandparents were Pauline de Castellane and Count Maximilian von Hatzfeldt, who spent ten years from 1849 to 1859 as the German Minister to France and who signed the Treaty of Paris in 1856 which ended the Crimean War. After her grandfather's death, her grandmother remarried to Louis de Talleyrand-Périgord, duc de Valençay, 3rd duc de Talleyrand-Périgord. Her aunt Margarete was the wife of the Ambassador Anton Saurma von der Jeltsch.

Count von Pourtalès died on 3 May 1928 at Bad Nauheim, Germany.

=== Residences ===
In 1824, his grandfather Count Karl von Pourtalès (who married Marie Louise Elisabeth de Castellane), a Royal Counselor, purchased the estate of Schloss Glumbowitz which included a classicist palace. Friedrich later owned the palace which he filled with "numerous works of art" that were gifted to him by his father. (Note: After his death in 1928, the art collection was sold. When Glumbowitz fell to Poland with most of Silesia in 1945, Glumbowitz Palace was appropriated as the headquarters of a farming cooperative. Since then, the castle has fallen into ruin.) Pourtalès also owned a country estate, Villa Mettlen, in the municipality of Muri bei Bern in Bern, Switzerland.
