= Chandi Prasad Bhatt =

Indian environmentalist

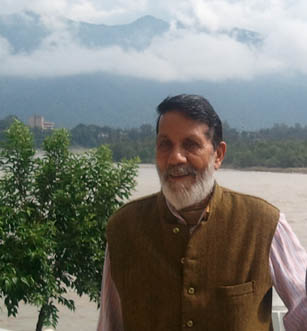
- Born: 23 June 1934 (age 92); Gopeshwar, Chamoli, Uttarakhand, India
- Occupations: Environmentalist and social activist
- Years active: 1960–present
- Movement: Chipko Movement
- Parent(s): Ganga Ram Bhatt (father); Maheshi Devi Thapliyal (mother)
- Awards: Ramon Magsaysay Award (1982); Padma Bhushan (2005); Gandhi Peace Prize (2013)

Chandi Prasad Bhatt (born 23 June 1934) is an Indian environmentalist and social activist, who founded Dasholi Gram Swarajya Sangh (DGSS) in Gopeshwar in 1964, which later became a mother-organization to the Chipko Movement, in which he was one of the pioneers. For his work Bhatt was awarded the Ramon Magsaysay Award in 1982, followed by the Padma Bhushan in 2005.

Today he is known for his work on subaltern social ecology, and considered one of India's first modern environmentalists.

In 2013, he was the recipient of the Gandhi Peace Prize.

== Early life ==
Chandi Prasad Bhatt was born on 23 June 1934, as the second child of Ganga Ram Bhatt and Maheshi Devi Thapliyal, in a family of priests to the Rudranath Temple in Gopeshwar, one of the Panch Kedar, the five Himalayan temples dedicated to Shiva, the most venerated amongst them being the Kedarnath Temple. His father, who was a farmer as well as a priest at the famous Shiva temple at Gopeshwar and the Rudranath temple, died when Chandi Prasad was still an infant and he was raised thereafter by his mother, in Gopeshwar, Chamoli District of Uttarakhand in India, which was then still a very small village. He did his schooling in Rudraprayag and Pauri, but stopped before he could receive a degree.

== Career ==
Farmland was scarce in the overpopulated mountains, and so were jobs. Like most men of the mountain villages, Chandi Prasad taught art to children for a year to support his mother, before eventually forced to work in the plains. He joined the Garhwal Motor Owners Union (GMOU) as a booking clerk, posted at various places including, Rishikesh, Pipalkoti and Karnaprayag.

In 1956, Bhatt found hope when he heard a speech by the Gandhian leader Jayaprakash Narayan, who was on a tour of the area. Bhatt and other young people launched themselves into the Sarvodaya movement and Gandhian campaigns, of Bhoodan and Gramdan and organising villages for economic development and fighting liquor abuse throughout the Uttarakhand.

In 1960, he left his job at GMOU, to commit full-time to his Sarvodaya activities, and by 1964, Bhatt had instituted the Dasholi Gram Swarajya Mandal (Society for Village Self-Rule) to organise fellow villagers in Gopeshwar for employment near their homes in forest-based industries, making wooden implements from ash trees and gathering and marketing herbs for ayurvedic medicine-and to combat vice and exploitation.

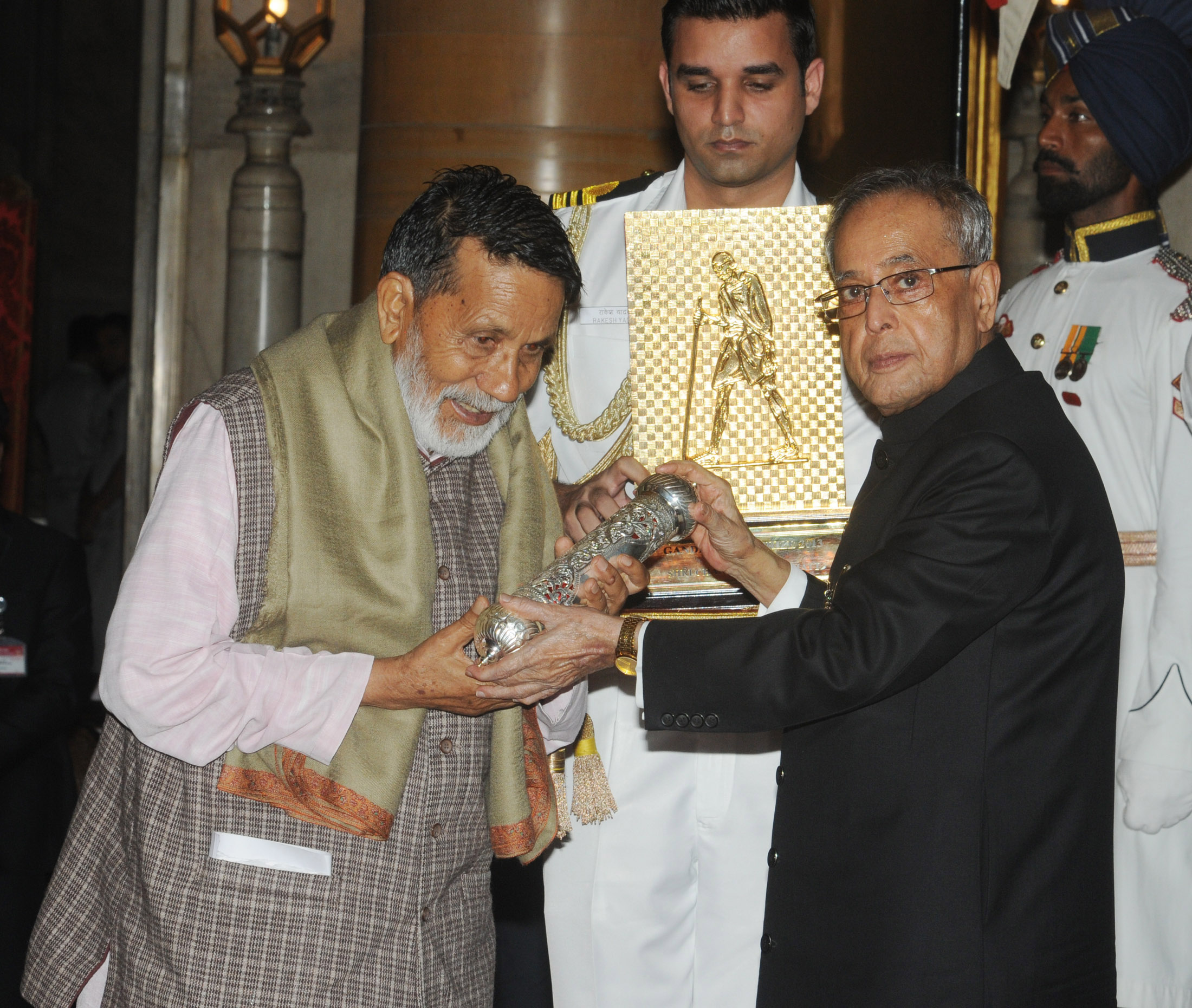
Chandi Prasad Bhatt receiving the Gandhi Peace Prize for the year 2013 from The President, Shri Pranab Mukherjee.

Curtailment of the villagers' legitimate rights to trees and forest products in favour of outside commercial interests enabled Bhatt, in 1973, to mobilise the forest-wise society members and villagers into the collective Chipko Andolan (Hug the Trees Movement) to force revision of forest policies dating from 1917. Women, who regularly walk three to five miles to the forest to gather and carry home fuel and fodder on their backs, took the lead. True to the movement's non-violent philosophy, these women embraced the trees to restrict their felling. Establishment of "eco-development camps" brought villagers together to discuss their needs within the context of the ecological balance of the forest. Stabilising slopes by building rock retaining walls, the campers planted trees, started in their own village nurseries. While less than one-third of the trees set out by government foresters survived, up to 88 percent of the villager-planted trees grew.

In 1974 he and his colleagues led a movement to save the cultural and archaeological heritage of the Badrinath shrine.

As an indigenous movement of mountain villagers, Bhatt and his society colleagues have been helped by scientists, officials and college students. Chipko Andolan has become an instrument of action and education for members, officials and outsiders, in the realities of effective resource conservation.

Although Bhatt has attended meetings in lowland India and abroad as a spokesman for Chipko, he has remained a man of his community. He and his wife continue to live the simple life of their Himalayan neighbours. In the process, he has become knowledgeable and productive in helping ensure his people's hard-won living. In 2003, he was appointed a member of the National Forest Commission, which reviewed all existing policies and legal frameworks relating to forest management, and submitted its report to the Government in 2005. His active participation at BIPARD Gaya for 2nd CFC's on 15 th of March 2024.

=== Protection of Badrinath Temple ===
In 1974, Bhatt led a campaign opposing a renovation project at the Badrinath Temple that involved the construction of reinforced concrete structures around the historic shrine. After inspecting the site and raising concerns about the impact on the temple's traditional Himalayan architecture and surrounding environment, he mobilized public opinion through local organizations and media outreach. The campaign prompted the Uttar Pradesh government to review the project and halt construction pending an inquiry. The subsequent review contributed to preserving the temple's traditional architectural character.

== Joshimath crisis ==
In January 2023, during the land subsidence crisis in Joshimath, Uttarakhand, Bhatt stated that the disaster was linked not only to geological factors but also to the failure of successive governments to act on expert warnings issued over several decades. He highlighted a landslide hazard zonation study conducted by a consortium of scientific institutions, including the National Remote Sensing Agency (NRSA), which had been submitted to the Uttarakhand government in 2001 and had identified large parts of the Joshimath region as vulnerable to landslides.

Bhatt said that the findings of the 2001 zonation study, along with recommendations made earlier by the Mishra Committee in 1976, had not been adequately implemented. He argued that repeated scientific studies would have limited value unless their recommendations were acted upon and called for greater attention to environmental safeguards in the Himalayan region.

== Publications ==
(Selected Books)

- Gentle Resistance: The Autobiography of Chandi Prasad Bhatt
- Gudgudi ek samajik karyakarta ki jeewangatha :
- Parvat Parvat, Basti Basti — Publisher NBT India
- Pratikar Ke Ankur (Hindi)
- Adhure Gyan Aur Kalpanik Vishwas Par Himalaya Se Chherkhani Ghatak (Hindi)
- Future of Large Projects in the Himalaya
- Eco-system of Central Himalaya
- Chipko Experience

== Awards and honours ==
Year	Award/Honours
1982	Ramon Magsaysay Award for Community Leadership
1986	Padma Shri
2005	Padma Bhushan
2013	Awarded Gandhi Peace Prize for the year 2013 on 15 July 2014 by The President of India
2016	Sri Sathya Sai Award for Human Excellence in the Environment category by Sri Sathya Sai Lok Seva Trust
2017/2018	Indira Gandhi Award for National Integration
