= Georg von Kanitz =

Georg Karl Elias Graf von Kanitz (6 September 1842 – 3 January 1922) was a member of the German Reichstag and military attaché to the Embassy of the German Empire in Tehran during World War I.

== Early life ==
Georg was born 6 September 1842. He was a son of Emil Carl Ferdinand Graf von Kanitz (1807–1877) and Charlotte von Sydow (1820–1868). His older brother, Hans Graf von Kanitz, a member of the Prussian House of Representatives, and his younger brother, Alexander Carl Richard Graf von Kanitz, who was a member of the Prussian House of Lords from 1911 to 1918.

He studied law at the University of Berlin and the University of Heidelberg where he was a member of the Corps Saxo-Borussia.

== Career ==
He was a Lieutenant in the 1st Guard Dragoons Regiment and then in the Zieten Hussars, taking part in the wars in 1866 and 1870 to 1871 before retiring from military service as a Major. He served as aide de camp to Gen. Prince Friedrich Karl of Prussia since 27 December 1866. From 22 April 1870 until Prince Friedrich Karl's death in 1885, von Kanitz was his court marshal. He then served as court marshal to his son, Prince Friedrich Leopold of Prussia.

On 19 March 1886, he was appointed master of ceremonies, serving until 12 June 1889 when he was discharged. Count von Kanitz belonged to the royal court of German Emperor and King of Prussia Wilhelm II. He held the offices of Chamberlain and Vice-Chief of Ceremonies. From 1893 until his resignation on 14 March 1894, he was a German Conservative Party member of the German Reichstag for the Schlochau, Flatow, and Marienwerder districts.

While serving as military attaché to the Embassy of the German Empire in Tehran during World War I, Count von Kanitz's duties included rallying pro-German units for the war in the Middle East.

He was supposedly heading a force at the town of Kangavar in 1916, against Russian troops under general Nikolai Baratov.

== Personal life ==
Anton was married to Hélène Boniface Pauline Luise Gräfin von Hatzfeldt zu Trachenberg (11 July 1847 – 12 February 1931), a daughter of Pauline de Castellane and Count Max von Hatzfeldt, who spent ten years from 1849 to 1859 as the German Minister to France and who signed the Treaty of Paris in 1856 which ended the Crimean War.

After her father's death, her mother remarried, to Louis de Talleyrand-Périgord, duc de Valençay, 3rd duc de Talleyrand-Périgord. Her younger sister, Margarete, was the wife of the German diplomat Anton Saurma von der Jeltsch. Together, they were the parents of one son and three daughters before their divorce on 28 August 1884, including:

- Friedrich Karl Maximilian Paul Emil Ludwig Georg Graf von Kanitz (1871–1945)
- Gisela Elisabeth Kordelia Maria Charlotte Maximiliane Rahel Josepha Gräfin von Kanitz (1873–1957); who married Friedrich Graf von Pourtalès (1853–1928), a German diplomat who was involved in the 1914 July Crisis. They lived at Villa Mettlen in the Bern, Switzerland.
- Vera Maria Elisabeth Marequita Maximiliane Charlotte Luise Gräfin von Kanitz (1875–1962); who married Lazarus Herbert Patrik Valentin Graf Henckel von Donnersmarck (1869–1940). She was also the mother of Bina Rothschild.
- Irma Elisabeth Agnes Margit Dolly Maximiliane Charlotte Gräfin von Kanitz (1877–1968); who married Friedrich Graf zu Pappenheim (1863–1926), the Court Marshal of Bavaria.

Count von Kanitz died on 3 January 1922, aged 79.
