= Prince Frederick of Orange-Nassau =

Dutch prince

Frederick
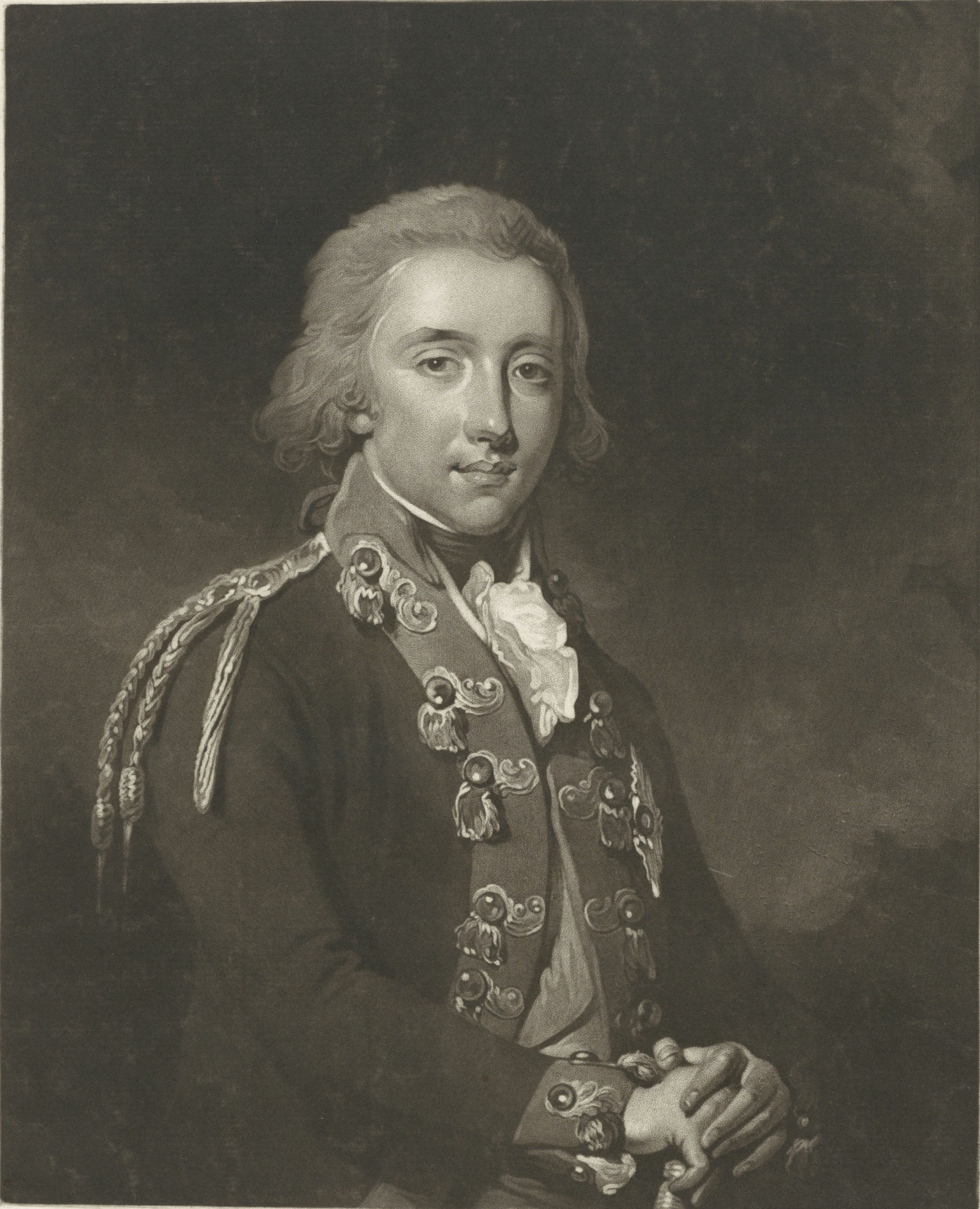
- Portrait of Prince Frederick, 1794
- Born: 15 February 1774; The Hague, Dutch Republic
- Died: 6 January 1799 (aged 24); Padua, Veneto, Italy
- Burial: Nieuwe Kerk, Delft (originally Padua, Italy)
Names
- Willem George Frederik van Oranje-Nassau
- House: Orange-Nassau
- Father: William V, Prince of Orange
- Mother: Princess Wilhelmina of Prussia
- Military career
- Allegiance: Dutch Republic; Habsburg monarchy
- Branch: Dutch States Army; Imperial Austrian Army
- Service years: 1792–1795; 1796–1799
- Rank: General of Cavalry; Feldzeugmeister
- Conflicts: French Revolutionary Wars; War of the First Coalition; War of the Second Coalition
- Awards: Military Order of Maria Theresa

Prince Frederik of Orange-Nassau (English: William George Frederick, Dutch: Willem George Frederik; 15 February 1774 – 6 January 1799) was a Dutch and Austrian general during the War of the First Coalition. He died in exile of a fever while serving in Padua, Italy.

== Early life ==
Prince Frederick (as he is usually referred to), the youngest son of William V, Prince of Orange and Stadtholder of the Dutch Republic and Princess Wilhelmina of Prussia, sister of King Frederick William II, chose a military career with the Holy Roman Empire.

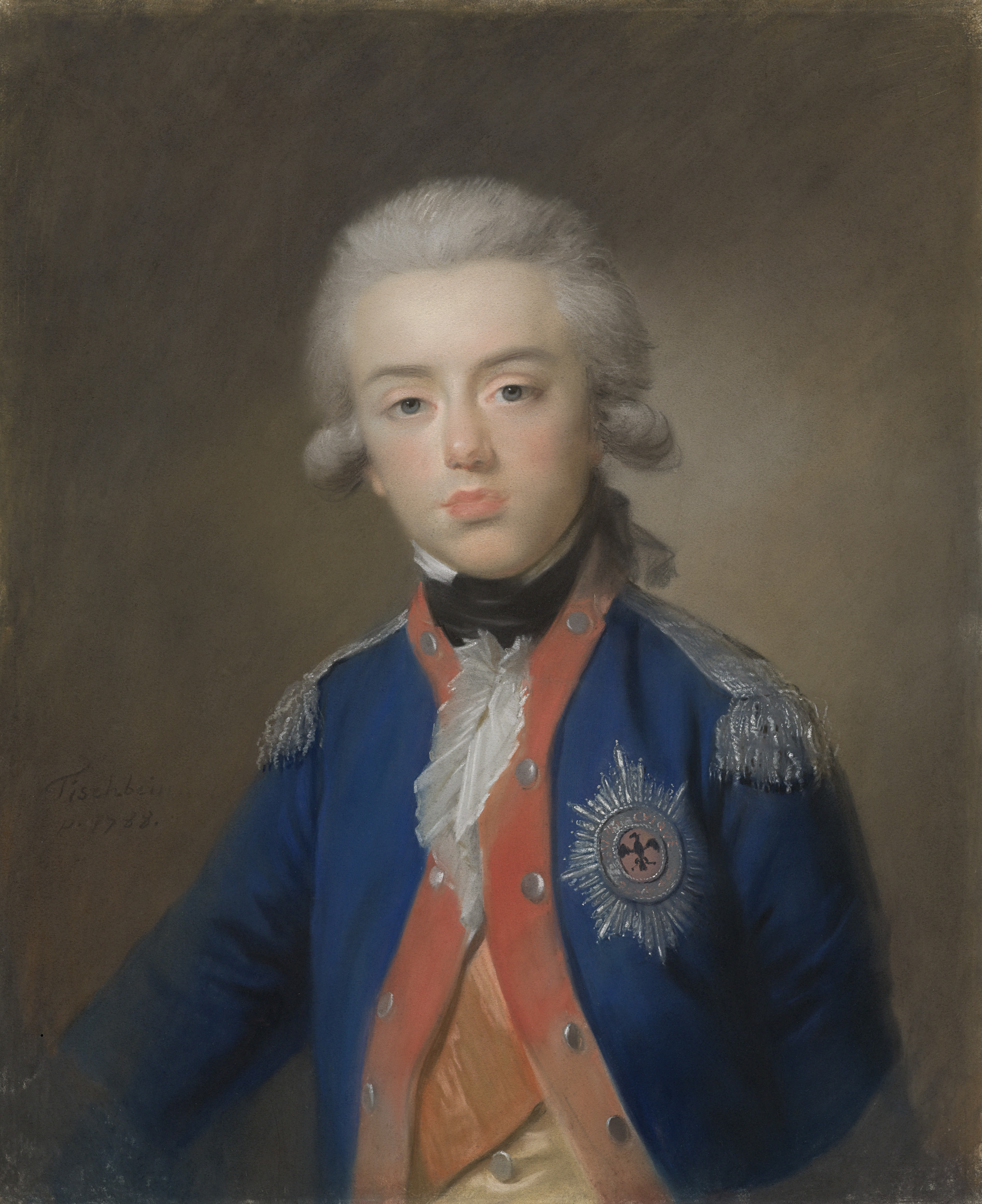
Portrait of William Frederick in 1788 by Johann Friedrich August Tischbein

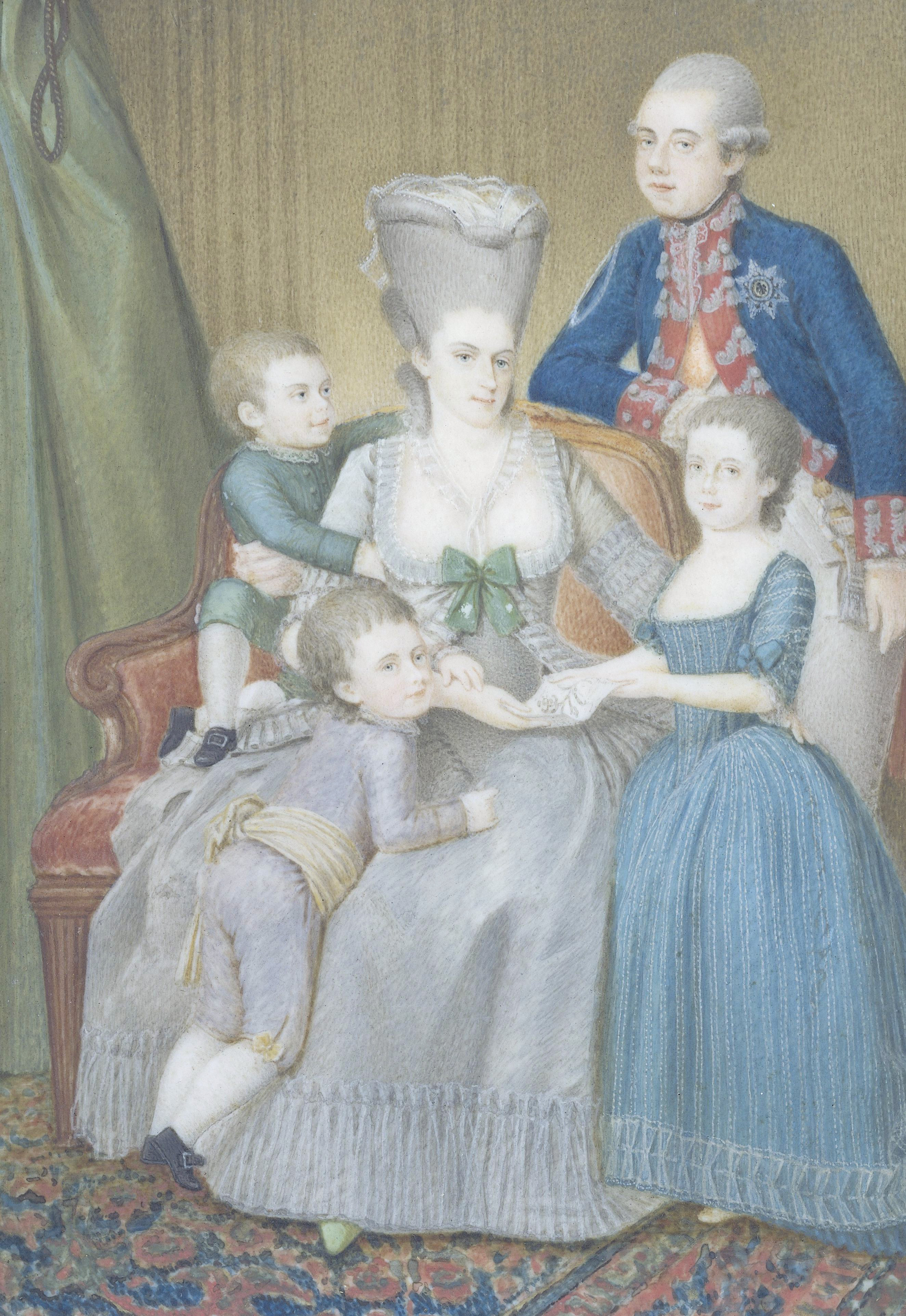
A portrait of Dutch princely family painted by Pieter le Sage in 1779. Frederick is on the left, embracing his mother.

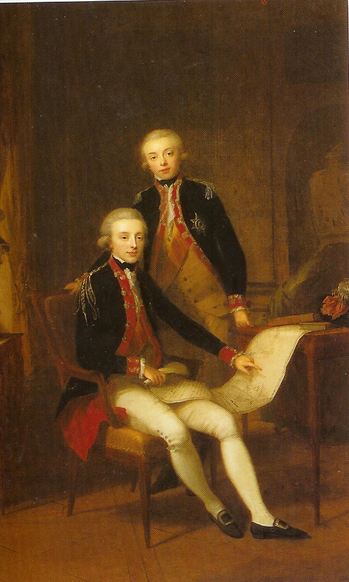
An anonymous portrait of Frederick (standing) and his elder brother Willem (sitting), painted about 1790.

=== Family ===
Prince Frederick, or "Fritz", as members of his family called him, was born in The Hague in the Dutch Republic. His parents, William V and Princess Wilhelmina, already had two children: Frederica Louise Wilhelmina (1770–1819) and Willem Frederik (1772–1843); Louise would later marry the Hereditary Prince of Brunswick-Wolfenbüttel and Willem would become the first Dutch King. Frederick was related to the British royal family through both his father, who was the grandson of George II of Great Britain, and through his mother, who was the grandniece of George II.

=== Education and military beginnings ===
Even as a young boy, he was bright and showed much promise in the military field; General Prince Frederick Stamford, mathematician Leonhard Euler and historian Herman Tollius were among his tutors. After military training in Brunswick, where his cousin once removed was reigning duke, Prince Frederick began active military service in 1792 when the States-General granted him the rank of lieutenant-general of the cavalry and grand master of artillery. In 1793, he was called to war when the Republic had to be defended against the French. He was an inspiring leader and was usually in the forefront. Prince Frederick took upon himself the defense of the northwestern part of Brabant. Later, he served under his older brother at Veurne (Furnes) and Menin. While fighting in the latter battle at Flemish Wervik, on 12/13 September 1793, Frederick suffered an injury when he was shot in the shoulder; this was an injury he never fully recovered from. In 1794, he was appointed general of the cavalry.

=== Life in exile ===
In 1795 the prince wanted to withdraw troops from Friesland, where they were fighting the French and Dutch patriots; his father did not give permission. In January 1795, the Batavian Republic, where the stadtholder and his family were no longer welcome, was established. Thus, William V took his entire family and fled to Great Britain, where George III, William's first cousin, was king. On 22 July 1795 Prince Frederik and his aide-de-camp, Perponcher, went to Osnabrück, where the so-called rassemblement (Note: see also King's Dutch Brigade) occurred. He gathered Dutch officers and troops for a raid in the Batavian Republic. Back in England, Frederick fell in love with Princess Mary (1776–1857), the fourth daughter of King George III, and she with him. George, however not opposing the marriage, felt that the marriages of his three elder daughters, Charlotte (1766–1828), Augusta Sophia (1768–1840), and Elizabeth (1770–1840), had to be tended to first. Eventually, after Frederick's death, Mary married her first cousin, the Duke of Gloucester and Edinburgh.

== Austrian military service ==
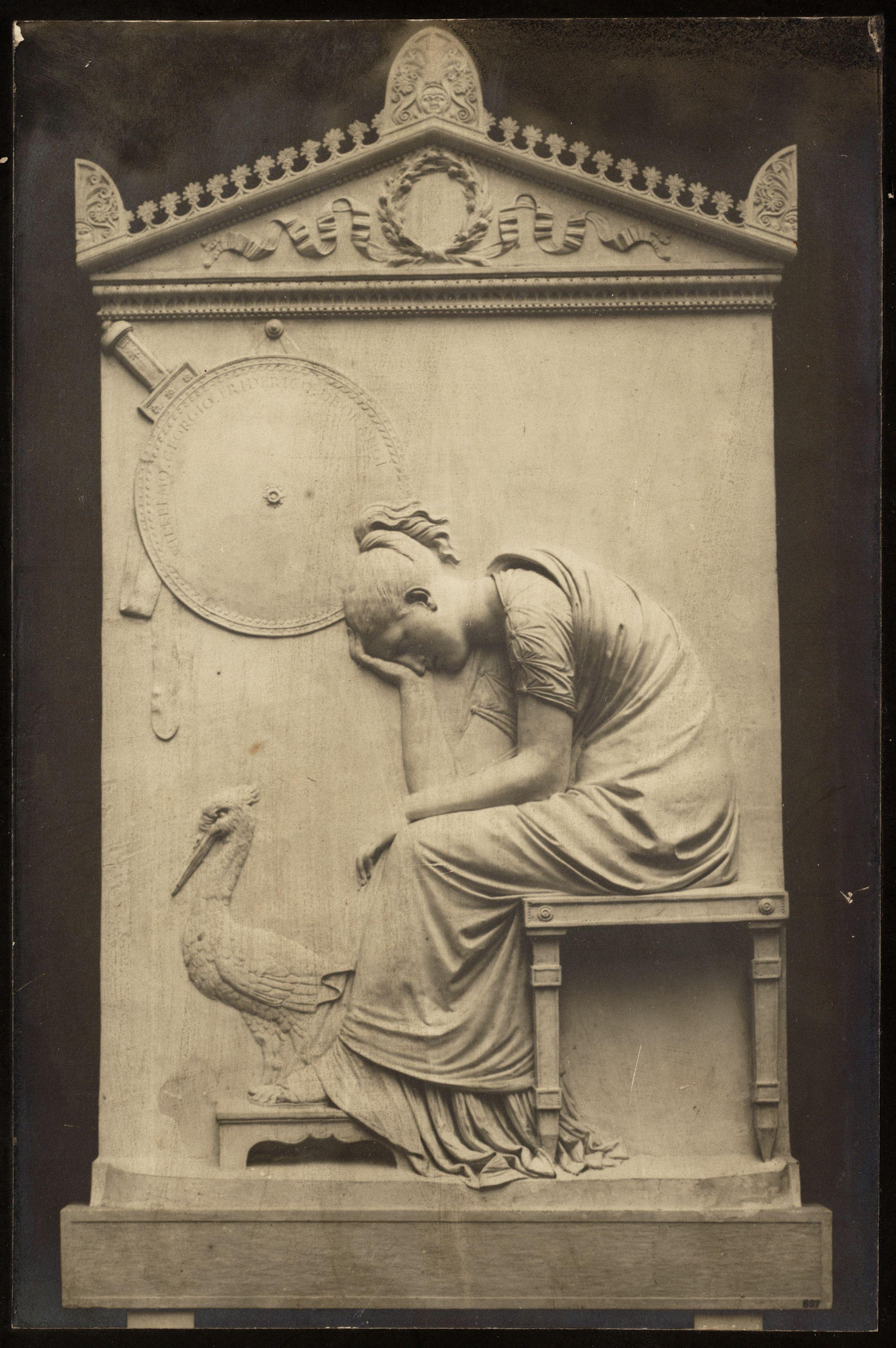
Frederick's tomb in Nieuwe Kerk

Prince Frederick went via England to Vienna, where he was given, in May 1796, the rank of Major General. He commanded a brigade in the corps of Wilhelm von Wartensleben, in the army of Archduke Charles. Later, commanded by Paul Kray, he defended southern Germany and Nassau. Prince Frederick participated in several battles in Germany and played a role in the conquest of Kehl in January 1797. As Archduke Charles was growing more and more pleased with Frederick, the latter was asked to go to Italy. There he became the commander of four German battalions. He managed on 2 April 1797 to stop the vanguard of Napoleon at Einöd, which resulted in the Treaty of Campo Formio. Due to his performance in Einöd he received the Military Order of Maria Theresa. Because he still suffered from his wounded shoulder, he underwent surgery at Görz in the summer of 1797 and recovered in Baden. On 29 October 1797, he was appointed lieutenant field marshal. After spending the winter of 1797–98 at Hampton Court, he returned to Vienna at the end of April 1798. Then followed a five-week tour of inspection along the Italian border. Prince Frederick was still not fully recovered and collapsed at Gorizia. On 14 November 1798 he was appointed commander of the Austrian army in Italy, with the rank of Feldzeugmeister, as he prepared the army for battle against the French army under Barthélemy Louis Joseph Schérer.

He visited many sick soldiers while in Padua, Italy. It is possible that, as a result of these visits, he contracted a malignant fever. On the night of 5–6 January 1799, Prince Frederick died in the arms of his aide, Hendrik George de Perponcher Sedlnitsky. Originally, he was buried in the cloister of the Hermits of Padua. In 1807, his family ordered a marble monument by Antonio Canova. In 1896, Queen Emma ordered Frederick to be moved to Nieuwe Kerk, the family burial site in Delft. She boarded a vessel to Padua, but was unable to find the prince's remains. The body was finally found on 3 July 1896 and was buried in Nieuwe Kerk on 7 August 1896. The monument was rebuilt in the church behind the tomb of Frederick's brother Willem. As both the church and the cloister of the Hermits of Padua were severely damaged in WW II, the Queen-Regent's action has proven to be a wise one.

== Ancestry ==
Ancestors of Prince Frederick of Orange-Nassau

16. Henry Casimir II, Prince of Nassau-Dietz
8. John William Friso, Prince of Orange
17. Princess Henriette Amalia of Anhalt-Dessau
4. William IV, Prince of Orange
18. Charles I, Landgrave of Hesse-Kassel
9. Princess Marie Louise of Hesse-Kassel
19. Princess Maria Amalia of Courland
2. William V, Prince of Orange
20. George I of Great Britain (= 26)
10. George II of Great Britain
21. Princess Sophia Dorothea of Celle (= 27)
5. Anne, Princess Royal
22. John Frederick, Margrave of Brandenburg-Ansbach
11. Princess Caroline of Brandenburg-Ansbach
23. Princess Eleonore Erdmuthe of Saxe-Eisenach
1. Prince Frederick of Orange-Nassau
24. Frederick I of Prussia
12. Frederick William I of Prussia
25. Princess Sophia Charlotte of Hanover
6. Prince Augustus William of Prussia
26. George I of Great Britain (= 20)
13. Princess Sophia Dorothea of Hanover
27. Princess Sophia Dorothea of Celle (= 21)
3. Princess Wilhelmina of Prussia
28. Ferdinand Albert I, Duke of Brunswick-Wolfenbüttel-Bevern
14. Ferdinand Albert II, Duke of Brunswick-Wolfenbüttel
29. Princess Christine of Hesse-Eschwege
7. Duchess Luise of Brunswick-Wolfenbüttel
30. Louis Rudolph, Duke of Brunswick-Wolfenbüttel
15. Duchess Antoinette of Brunswick-Wolfenbüttel
31. Princess Christine Louise of Oettingen-Oettingen

== Sources ==
- Aa, A. J. van der, ed. (1877). "Willem George Frederik". Biografisch Woordenboek der Nederlanden. Deel 20 (DBNL) (in Dutch). pp. 264–267.
- Blok, P.J.; Molhuysen, P.C., eds. (1911). "Frederik, Willem George Frederik". Nieuw Nederlandsch biografisch woordenboek (DNBL) (in Dutch). Sijthoff. pp. 894–896.
