= Gandhi Peace Prize =

Annual award by the Indian government

- Awarded for: Contributions towards social, economic and political transformation through non-violence and other Gandhian methods
- Sponsored by: Government of India
- Presented by: Government of India
- Reward: ₹ 1 Crore
- First award: 1995
- Final award: 2021

Highlights
- Total awarded: 20
- Latest winner: Gita Press

The Gandhi Peace Prize, named after Mahatma Gandhi, is awarded annually by the Government of India.

As a tribute to the ideals espoused by Gandhi, the Government of India launched the International Gandhi Peace Prize in 1995 on the occasion of the 125th birth anniversary of Mohandas Gandhi. This is an annual award given to individuals and institutions for their contributions towards social, economic and political transformation through non-violence and other Gandhian methods. The award carries ₹1 crore (equivalent to ₹1.3 crore or US$140,000 in 2026) in cash, convertible in any currency in the world, a plaque and a citation. It is open to all persons regardless of nationality, race, creed or gender.

A jury consisting of the Prime Minister of India, the Leader of the Opposition in the Lok Sabha, the Chief Justice of India, Speaker of the Lok Sabha and two other eminent person appointed every three years eligible for reappointment decides the awardee each year.

Ordinarily, only proposals coming from competent persons invited to nominate are considered. However, a proposal is not taken as invalid for consideration by the jury merely on the ground of not having emanated from competent persons. If it is considered that none of the proposals merit recognition, the jury is free to withhold the award for that year; the award was withheld in the years from 2006 to 2012 inclusive. Only achievements within 10 years immediately preceding the nomination are considered for the award; an older work may, however, be considered if its significance has not become apparent until recently. A written work, to be eligible for consideration, should have been published.

== Recipients ==
Indicates a joint award for that year

Sl no	Year	Recipient	Image	Birth / death	Country	Description
1	1995	Julius Nyerere		1922–1999	Tanzania	Julius Kambarage Nyerere was a Tanzanian politician who served as the leader of Tanzania, and previously Tanganyika, from 1960 until his retirement in 1985.
2	1996	A. T. Ariyaratne		1931–2024	Sri Lanka	Founder of Sarvodaya Shramadana Movement
3	1997	Gerhard Fischer		1921–2006	Germany	German diplomat, recognised for his work against leprosy and polio
4	1998	Ramakrishna Mission		(founded 1897)	India	Founded by Swami Vivekananda for promoting social welfare, tolerance, and non-violence among disadvantaged groups
5	1999	Baba Amte		1914–2008	India	Social worker, known particularly for his work for the rehabilitation and empowerment of poor people suffering from leprosy
6	2000	Nelson Mandela		1918–2013	South Africa	Former President of South Africa
6	2000	Grameen Bank		(founded 1983)	Bangladesh	Founded by Muhammad Yunus
7	2001	John Hume		1937–2020	Ireland	Northern Irish Politician and major figure in the Northern Ireland peace process
8	2002	Bharatiya Vidya Bhavan		(founded 1938)	India	Educational trust that emphasises Indian culture
9	2003	Václav Havel		1936–2011	Czech Republic	Last President of Czechoslovakia and first President of the Czech Republic
10	2004	Coretta Scott King		1927–2006	United States	Activist and civil rights leader.
11	2005	Desmond Tutu		1931–2021	South Africa	South African cleric and activist.He was South African social rights activist and retired Anglican bishop who rose to worldwide fame during the 1980s as an opponent of apartheid.
12	2013	Chandi Prasad Bhatt		(born 1934)	India	Environmentalist, social activist and pioneer of the Chipko movement. Founded Dasholi Gram Swarajya Sangh (DGSS)
13	2014	ISRO		(founded 1969)	India	Space agency of the Indian Govt. Objective is to advance space technology and deliver the applications of it
14	2015	Vivekananda Kendra		(founded 1972)	India	A Hindu spiritual organisation based on the principles preached by Swami Vivekananda
15	2016	Akshaya Patra Foundation		(founded 2000)	India	A non-profit organisation in India that runs school lunch programme across India
15	2016	Sulabh International		(founded 1970)	India	A social service organization that works to promote human rights, environmental sanitation, non-conventional sources of energy, waste management and social reforms through education.
16	2017	Ekal Vidyalaya		(founded 1986)	India	Contribution in providing Education for Rural and Tribal Children in remote areas pan India, Rural Empowerment, Gender and Social Equality.
17	2018	Yōhei Sasakawa		(born 1939)	Japan	For his contribution in Leprosy Eradication in India and across the world.
18	2019	Qaboos bin Said		1940–2020	Oman	For contributions for social, economic and political transformation through non-violent and other Gandhian methods.
19	2020	Sheikh Mujibur Rahman		1920–1975	Bangladesh	For his contributions towards social, economic and political transformation through non-violent and other Gandhian methods.
20	2021	Gita Press		(founded 1923)	India	For outstanding contributions towards social, economic and political transformation through non-violent and other Gandhian methods.

== See also ==
- Gandhi Memorial International Foundation
- Gandhi Peace Award
- Indira Gandhi Peace Prize
- List of peace activists
- Nobel Peace Prize
- Sakharov Prize
