= Gerhard Fischer (diplomat) =

German diplomat (1921–2006)

West Germany Ambassador to Malaysia
- In office 1970 – March 1974
- President: Gustav Heinemann

West Germany Ambassador to Ireland
- In office July 1977 – 1980
- President: Walter Scheel; Karl Carstens

West Germany Ambassador to the Netherlands
- In office 1980 – mid-1983
- President: Karl Carstens

West Germany Ambassador to Switzerland
- In office mid-1983 – December 1985
- President: Karl Carstens; Richard von Weizsäcker

Personal details
- Born: 20 September 1921 Oslo, Norway
- Died: 3 July 2006 (aged 84) Copenhagen, Denmark
- Spouse: Ann Lohmann Fischer
- Relations: Per Fischer (brother) (Note: Fischer's brother, Per, was also an ambassador, and became German Ambassador to China)
- Children: Karen Fischer Koch; Martin John Fischer
- Education: Beijing Medical University; Ludwig-Maximilians-Universität München

Gerhard Fischer (20 September 1921 – 3 July 2006) was a German diplomat, ambassador and humanitarian who received the 1997 Gandhi Peace Prize in recognition of his work for leprosy and polio-affected patients in India.

Born in Oslo, Fischer grew up in China and studied medicine at Beijing Medical University, where he gained experience as a volunteer with leprosy patients. When he was forced to abandon the course by the Japanese occupation, he travelled to Germany intending to study medicine there, but instead was obliged to fight in World War II, then was held as a POW in France. After the war, he obtained a law degree and entered the German diplomatic service.

While at the German consulate in Madras, he helped a German doctor to establish a leprosy treatment and rehabilitation centre at Chettipatty. He was also instrumental in setting up the Indian Institute of Technology in Madras, which was founded with financial and technical support from the West German government. He later became ambassador to Malaysia, Ireland, Netherlands, and finally Switzerland.

He resigned from the diplomatic service in order to devote himself full-time to the support of leprosy and polio patients in India. Fischer regarded rehabilitation as the most important aspect of his work, and emphasised the need for attitudes to leprosy to change. His work was recognised by the Indian government with the award of the Gandhi Peace Prize. Fischer used the money from the prize to set up a foundation for his humanitarian work.

== Early life and education ==
Fischer was born in Oslo, Norway, the elder son of a Norwegian mother and a German father, Martin Fischer. When he was about 3 years old, his family moved to China, where his father was a sinologist. As a boy, Fischer had always wanted to be a doctor. He started to study medicine at Beijing Medical University, but was forced to abandon the course when the university was closed by the Japanese occupation. So he decided to travel—via Siberia—to Germany, intending to study medicine there, but was instead compelled to fight in "another huge war", a situation he regarded as a "trap". He spent five years fighting in the war, mainly on the Eastern Front, followed by two years nine months as a prisoner of war. Destitute after the war, studying medicine was out of the question. He worked as a truck driver and various other jobs, and after three years had saved enough money to study again. He entered a legal crammer, and in one year obtained a law degree, a course that normally requires four years' study.

While studying medicine in Beijing, he volunteered to look after leprosy patients (an opportunity offered to all medical students there, in the days before Fleming and modern antibiotics). From then on, he wanted to care for leprosy patients.

== Diplomatic career ==
With a law degree in hand, he decided to join the German foreign service, as that would take him overseas. In 1952–1953 he completed his training for the higher diplomatic and consular service in Speyer, Rhineland-Palatinate, passing the final exam in 1953. He began his career at the German legation in Addis Ababa, Ethiopia, followed by a posting to the consulate in Hong Kong from 1957 to 1960, when he took over the consulate in Madras. In 1963 he was promoted to Consul, and in 1964 returned to the Bonn headquarters of the Foreign Office (Auswärtiges Amt). He was appointed to the rank of Councillor (Vortragender Legationsrat) in 1966 and from 1968 headed a political department there, becoming a First Councillor (Vortragender Legationsrat Erster Klasse) shortly afterwards.

His first appointment as Ambassador came in 1970, when he represented West Germany in Kuala Lumpur, Malaysia. In March 1974 he was promoted to lead a large department in the Foreign Office dealing with Asia and Latin America. His second ambassadorial appointment came in July 1977, when he was sent to Dublin, followed by further appointments to The Hague, Netherlands (early 1980) and Bern, Switzerland (mid-1983). In December 1985, only six months before reaching his normal retirement age, he resigned from the diplomatic service in order to devote more time to leprosy patients in India.

Fischer later said that taking a European posting, after his service in Vietnam, Malaysia and India was a "mistake".

== Work with leprosy and polio patients ==
As well as volunteering with leprosy patients during his medical training in Beijing, Fischer had also looked after leprosy patients in his free time at Addis Ababa and Hong Kong.

Fischer's work with leprosy patients in India began in 1960, when he was German Consul-General in Madras (now Chennai), in Tamil Nadu. A German doctor, Elizabeth Vomstein, had asked for his help in obtaining a work permit so that she could work with a French nun she had heard of who was helping leprosy patients in Chettipatty, near Salem. Fischer successfully helped her get the work permit, then drove with her to Chettipatty. Fischer remained in post in Tamil Nadu for four years, during which time he regularly visited Vomstein's station in Chettipatty, which she slowly built up to what he regarded as a "model station".

After resigning from the diplomatic service in 1985, Fischer regularly spent six months each year in India, and six months in the summer with his wife at their small farm near Chiemsee, a lake in Bavaria. His wife, Ann, ran the administration, fund-raising and publicity for Fischer's work. They had decided not to have "an administration", so Fischer and his wife did everything on their own. Fischer said that his wife "deserves half this prize" (the Gandhi Peace Prize).

Until 1991 he worked with Elizabeth Vomstein at her station in Chettipatty. He found her "very, very difficult", but said, "If she wasn't that type, she wouldn't have lasted 38 years." By 1991, he had had enough, and started out on his own. He had already built his own leprosy station in the foothills of the Himalayas, and in the following years he established health centres, workshops and schools throughout India, building wells and latrines, and obtaining Jeeps, minibuses and other supplies. He was also involved with projects in Nepal and Vietnam.

Fischer regarded curing leprosy as the easy part, with modern medicines, good treatment and good food. Much more important to Fischer was rehabilitation, which he regarded as his primary aim. He recognised that patients with missing legs or fingers would have no chance of surviving outside his stations. So he trained them in skills to earn a living, such as making chappals, table cloths, mats, bed covers, beautiful carpets, and so on. He hoped to reach a position where his stations would no longer need donations, but could survive on their production.

=== Polio ===
Fischer's leprosy treatment, rehabilitation and vocational training centres also cared for polio victims. By 2005, new polio cases had been greatly reduced, thanks to vaccination and joint efforts between the Indian government and NGOs. As a result, Fischer's centres were able to take on additional responsibilities in other areas. But Fischer stressed the need for medical practitioners in the primary health centres to maintain a watch over polio and leprosy, and to be trained in recognising the symptoms.

=== Attitudes to leprosy ===
Fischer insisted that his patients should never be called "lepers", but rather "leprosy patients". Although he stated that he believed in karma, he condemned the consequent fatalism of, and inaction towards, leprosy patients in India, saying "It is not their fault. It is the bloody bug that caught them." He felt that they were outcasts who needed attention. In his Gandhi peace prize acceptance speech at the Rashtrapati Bhavan, he said, "Don't treat us like outcasts. Don't treat us like the forgotten. We are also here in this country although you don't care about us." Many visitors to his stations couldn't face the physically horrible nature of the disease, but Fischer said that it was far worse mentally to be an outcast from one's family and community. He said, "If you work in a leprosy community, the mental anguish is supreme and it is no different for me."

Fischer would touch all his patients, saying Nalla thane irukku ("You are all right"). He never wore a mask or gloves, as he thought the "human side" of his work was very important, that there should be no barriers, and that there was "no difference between us, two human beings".

=== "Leprosy is curable" ===
Fischer said, "I need publicity. I want to beat the drum, Leprosy is curable. Come and watch. Forget about the stigma. Forget about treating them as outcasts. Here I am constantly shouting to make the community aware and this Prize gives me a chance to focus the attention on 'us' who are forgotten."

=== Importance of early treatment ===
Fischer always emphasised the importance of early treatment. Patients were reluctant to admit that they might have leprosy, because of the fear of being thrown out of their family and community. Fischer said, "If you get early treatment, nobody can see that you ever had leprosy. This message is very important."

== Gandhi peace prize ==
Fischer received the Indian government's Gandhi Peace Prize for 1997 in New Delhi on 5 January 1998 from the President of India, K. R. Narayanan. The selection committee was unanimous in its decision to award the prize to Fischer. The prize carried an award of 10 million rupees, which Fischer used to set up a foundation for his humanitarian work. In his acceptance speech at the Rashtrapati Bhavan, the official residence of the President of India, Fischer said, "It is not enough to have compassion, daya, karuṇā, and pity for the leprosy patients. We lepers, we don't care about compassion. We want action." Referring to the government slogan of "eradicating leprosy by 2000", he said that his speech made people such as Sonia Gandhi, who were sitting in the front of the audience, very uncomfortable.

== Death ==
Fischer died in Copenhagen on 3 July 2006, aged 84 years. On 8 July 2006, a silent procession was organised at Ayikudi as a mark of respect. N.S. Rao, a former colleague of Fischer at the German consulate in Madras, said that Fischer "applied a missionary zeal to anything he put his mind to. He and his wife were a perfect two-people team and worked all over the country with tremendous energy and indefatigable enthusiasm. After his wife's death, he had been carrying on his social work relentlessly." Rao added that Fischer's daughter, Karen Fischer Koch, carried on her father's work after his death.
