= Mortimer von Maltzan =

Prussian diplomat and Foreign Minister

Mortimer von Maltzan Count von Maltzan

Foreign Minister of Prussia
- In office 30 August 1841 – 21 March 1842
- Monarch: Frederick William IV
- Preceded by: Heinrich Wilhelm von Werther
- Succeeded by: Heinrich von Bülow

Personal details
- Born: 15 April 1793 Lissa Castle in Leśnica, Breslau, Kingdom of Prussia
- Died: 8 August 1843 (aged 50) Berlin, Kingdom of Prussia
- Spouse: Countess Auguste von der Goltz
- Children: 7

Graf Joachim Karl Ludwig Mortimer von Maltzan (or Maltzahn), Freiherr von Wartenberg und Penzlin (15 April 1793 – 9 August 1843) was a Prussian diplomat and Foreign Minister from 1841 to 1842.

== Early life ==
Graf von Maltzan was born on 15 April 1793 at Lissa Castle in Leśnica, Breslau, Poland. He was the son of the Count Joachim Alexander Kasimir Maltzahn (1764–1850) and his wife Antoinie von Maltzahn (née Countess von Hoym) (1768–1799). After his mother's death in 1799, his father married Countess Ernestine Friederike von der Groeben (a daughter of Karl Ernst August von der Gröben).

His paternal grandparents were Joachim Karl von Maltzahn, Baron of Wartenburg and Penzlin and Christine Charlotte Maximiliane Ernestine von Mudrach. His maternal grandparents were Count Karl George von Hoym and Antonie Louise Amalie von Dyhrn und Schönau.

== Career ==
Maltzan participated in the War of the Sixth Coalition as an officer in the Prussian Garde du Corps. Then he joined the diplomatic service. At first, he was a legation secretary in various embassies. Later he was the chargé d'affaires in Darmstadt and envoy to The Hague, Hannover and Vienna. Lastly, he had the rank of minister plenipotentiary.

In 1841 Maltzan was made Prussian Foreign Minister. Karl August Varnhagen von Ense reproduced a report by Wilhelm von Humboldt, according to which King Frederick William IV was more satisfied with Maltzan than with any other ministers, and had complete trust and confidence in him. Due to a severe mental illness, however, he was dismissed in 1842, not long before his death in Berlin in 1843.

== Personal life ==
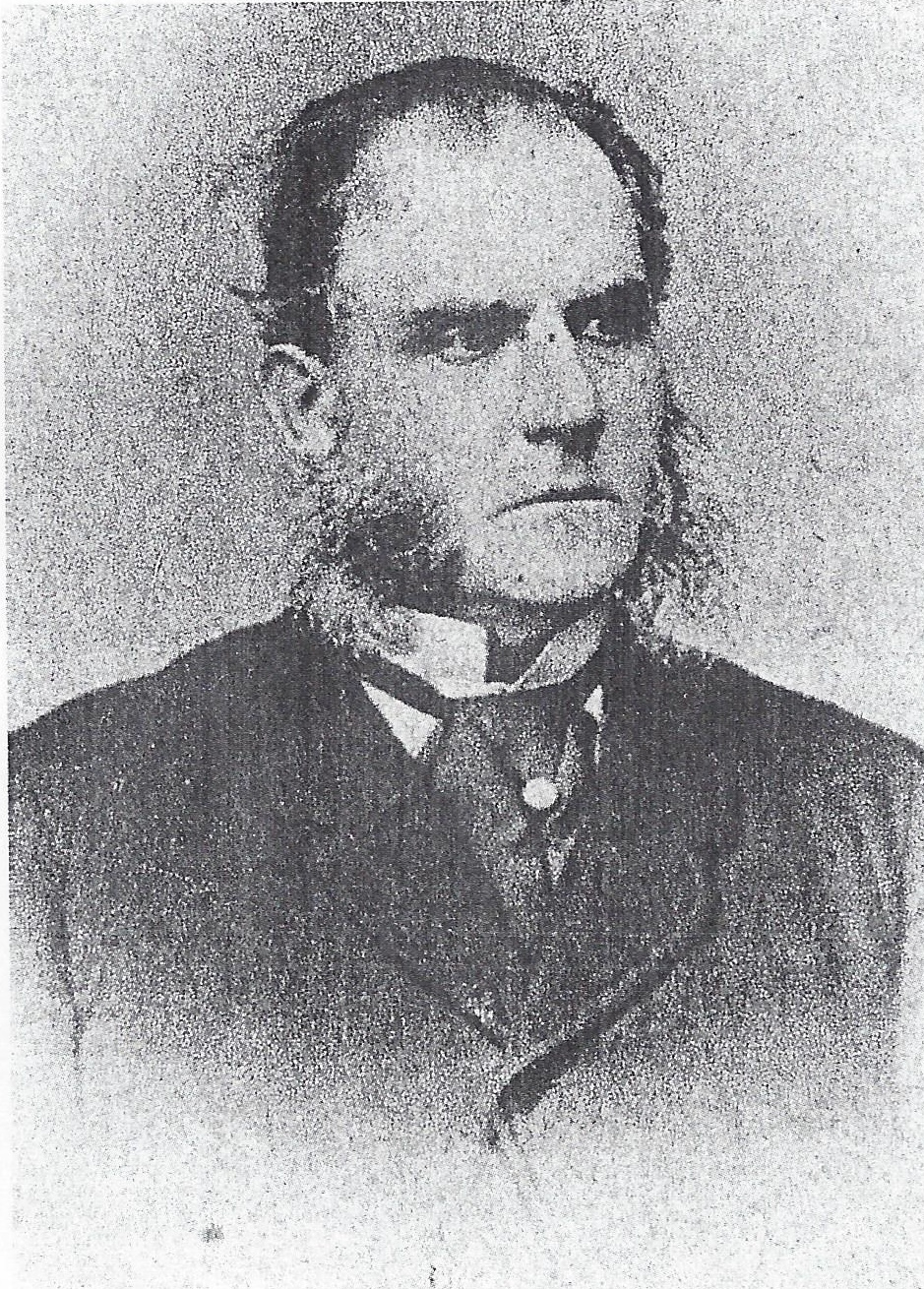
Photograph of his son, Count August Mortimer Joachim von Maltzan, c. 1876.

Maltzan married the Countess Auguste Marie Amalie Luise von der Goltz (1798–1837), a daughter of Count August Friedrich Ferdinand von der Goltz, the first Prussian Minister for Foreign Affairs, and the former Luise Juliane von Schack. Together, they were the parents of:

- Count Edwin von Maltzan (1817–1818), who died young.
- Countess Alexandrina Julia Theresa Wilhelmina Sophia von Matlzan (1818–1874), who married Frederick Lamb, 3rd Viscount Melbourne in 1841. After his death in 1853, she married John Weld-Forester, 2nd Baron Forester in 1856.
- Count Alexander Joachim Mortimer von Maltzan (1820–1840), who died unmarried.
- Count August Mortimer Joachim von Maltzan (1823–1878), who married Baroness Alma Bertha von Veltheim, a daughter of Baron Georg Albert Carl von Veltheim.
- Countess Antoinette Louise Emilie Julie von Maltzan (1825–1899), who served as Chief Court Mistress of Empress Augusta; she married Count Wilhelm von Perponcher-Sedlnitzky, eldest son of Dutch general and diplomat, Count Hendrik George de Perponcher Sedlnitsky.
- Countess Charlotte Luise Auguste von Maltzan (1827–1861), who married Count Wilhelm von Pourtalès, brother of Count Albert von Pourtalès, in 1848.
- Count Mortimer Ferdinand Ludwig Joachim von Maltzan (1832–1904), who died in a car accident near Bordeaux.

Countess von Maltzan died in 1837. He died on 9 August 1843 in Berlin.

=== Descendants ===
Through his daughter Charlotte, he was a grandfather of Friedrich von Pourtalès (1853–1928), who was the German ambassador to Russia when World War I broke out.
