= Hendrik George de Perponcher Sedlnitsky =

Dutch general and diplomat

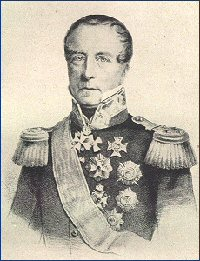
- Hendrik George de Perponcher Sedlnitsky
- Born: 19 May 1771; The Hague
- Died: 29 November 1856 (aged 85); Dresden
- Military career
- Allegiance: United Kingdom of the Netherlands
- Branch: Infantry
- Service years: 1788–1842
- Rank: general
- Unit: 2nd Netherlands Division
- Conflicts: French Invasion of Egypt (1798); Napoleonic Wars; Walcheren Campaign; Battle of Quatre Bras; Battle of Waterloo
- Awards: Knight Commander Military William Order

Hendrik George, Count de Perponcher Sedlnitsky (also Sedlnitzky; 19 May 1771 – 29 November 1856) was a Dutch general and diplomat. He commanded the 2nd Netherlands Division at the Battle of Quatre Bras and the Battle of Waterloo.

== Biography ==
=== Family life ===
Perponcher was the son of Cornelis, baron de Perponcher Sedlnitsky, (scion of an old Huguenot Dutch family and of old Bohemian noble family that had fled Bohemia after the 1621 Battle of White Mountain), a justice in the Hof van Holland (the high court of the province of Holland), and Jonkvrouwe Johanna Maria van Tuyll van Serooskerke. Though the family was not part of the Dutch nobility under the Dutch Republic it had acquired a number of Heerlijkheden, like many Regents, which gave it a de facto aristocratic status. When King William I of the Netherlands reorganized, and greatly extended, the Dutch nobility in 1815, the family De Perponcher Sedlnitsky was inducted into the Dutch nobility with the title of baron. Perponcher was himself elevated to the rank of hereditary count by the King in 1825.

Perponcher married Adelaide, countess Van Reede on 2 October 1816. They had three sons, including Wilhelm von Perponcher-Sedlnitzky, and a daughter. The three sons all went into Prussian government service and achieved high rank.

=== Early career ===
Perponcher entered the service of the Dutch Republic as a cadet in a regiment of dragoons in 1788. He was promoted to captain in 1792, and appointed aide-de-camp to Prince Willem George Frederik of Orange-Nassau, a younger son of stadtholder William V, Prince of Orange. With him he took part in the campaigns of the War of the First Coalition (he saved the Prince's life at the battle of Werwick of 13 September 1793) until the Republic was overrun by the revolutionary French armies and the Batavian Republic was proclaimed in 1795. Perponcher then followed his master into Austrian service, where Prince Frederik became a general. He was wounded at the siege of Kehl.

When Prince Frederik died on 6 January 1799 in Padua during an Austrian campaign in Italy, Perponcher transferred his allegiance to the British. He obtained a commission in a regiment of Jäger in British pay as a major. This regiment was sent to Egypt to fight the French in the Egypt and Syria Campaign of 1800-1801. He was wounded at the Battle of Alexandria. In 1804 he transferred as a major to Dillon's Regiment, which he soon thereafter commanded as a lieutenant-colonel in the Malta garrison.

In 1808 he was put in charge of the Loyal Lusitanian Legion as a colonel in the Peninsular War. He did not see action there, however, because he was recalled to England to become chief-of-staff of the Earl of Rosslyn's's light division in the Walcheren Campaign of 1809, where he saw action against his Dutch compatriots (now part of the Kingdom of Holland). After that campaign ended he resigned his British commission under threat of forfeiture of his Dutch possessions by Napoleon I of France, who annexed the Netherlands in 1810 and frowned on his new subjects serving in hostile armies.

Though without official duties, he was very active in Orangist circles during the next few years, which explains why he was selected as one of the emissaries of the Van Hogendorp triumvirate (that seized power in October 1813, in the Netherlands) to Prince William to invite him to become Sovereign Prince of the Netherlands. The Prince soon afterwards promoted him to major-general and put him in charge of the nascent new Dutch army. He led the campaign against the retreating French, and besieged the fortresses of Gorinchem, Bergen op Zoom, and Antwerp in late 1813 and early 1814. After the First Peace of Paris in 1814 he was for the first time appointed Dutch minister plenipotentiary at the Prussian court in Berlin.

=== Hundred Days Campaign ===
Perponcher was recalled from Berlin when Napoleon escaped from Elba in March 1815. He was put in charge of the new 2nd Netherlands Division with the rank of lieutenant-general. This division was partially (second brigade under major-general Saxe-Weimar) bivouacked at Quatre Bras, partially (first brigade under major-general Van Bylandt) at Nivelles on the fateful night of 15 June 1815. When Saxe-Weimar received orders from the Duke of Wellington to evacuate the strategic crossroads at Quatre Bras, he alerted Perponcher, because he thought that could not be right, and Perponcher took the matter up with major-general Jean Victor de Constant Rebecque, the chief-of-staff of the Netherlands Mobile Army. Together they decided to countermand Wellington's order, and Perponcher also sent his other brigade to take up positions at Quatre Bras. The two brigades together (though far outnumbered) managed to hold off the onslaught of the French left wing under Marshal Michel Ney long enough the next day to allow Wellington to bring up British reinforcements. The allies defeated the French at the Battle of Quatre Bras on June 16. The next day the Anglo-Dutch army performed a strategic retreat to the environs of Waterloo.

Here Wellington decided to split up Perponcher's division (though leaving him in charge). The Saxe-Weimar brigade was put on the extreme left wing of the Allied army; the Bylandt brigade was eventually placed between the British brigades of Pack and Kempt. The placement of the Bylandt brigade at the beginning of the battle of Waterloo is the subject of some controversy, as many historians erroneously place the brigade in an exposed position, due to faulty staff work. Others credit Perponcher with giving the order to move the brigade to a safer position before the initial French bombardment started around noon on 18 June. However, apparently Perponcher only executed an order from Wellington through the intermediary of the prince of Orange.

Both brigades performed well (despite what some British historians have written about the conduct of the Bylandt brigade, which ought to be contradicted by the appallingly high casualty figures of this brigade). Perponcher was in the thick of it, steadying the militia battalions of the Bylandt brigade after Bylandt had been forced to relinquish command, and leading them in a counterattack. He was made a Knight Commander of the Military William Order on 18 July 1815 in recognition.

=== Diplomatic career ===
After the Battle of Waterloo Perponcher was right away returned to his post as Dutch envoy to the Prussian Court in Berlin. He remained in this post until 1842. At his retirement he was promoted to full general. Apparently these many years in Berlin completely assimilated his three sons (born in 1819, 1821 and 1827) to their new environment. They all entered Prussian diplomatic or military service, where they achieved high rank. (One was chamberlain of Emperor Wilhelm I).

Perponcher died in Dresden in 1856.

== Sources ==
- (in Dutch)"Perponcher (Hendrik Georg Graaf de)", in: Aa, A.J. van der, Harderwijk, K.J.R. van, Schotel, G.D.R. (1872) Biographisch woordenboek der Nederlanden: bevattende levensbeschrijvingen van zoodanige personen, die zich op eenigerlei wijze in ons vanderland hebben vermaard gemaakt. Deel 15, pp. 189–191
- (in Dutch) "Perponcher-Sedlnitzky (Hendrik George, graaf de)', in Winkler Prins, A. (1886) Geïllustreerde encyclopaedie: woordenboek voor wetenschap en kunst, beschaving en nijverheid. Deel 12, p. 187

Dutch nobility
New creation	Count de Perponcher Sedlnitzky; 1825–1856	Succeeded by Wilhelm de Perponcher Sedlnitzky
