= Chamoli Gopeshwar =

- Town
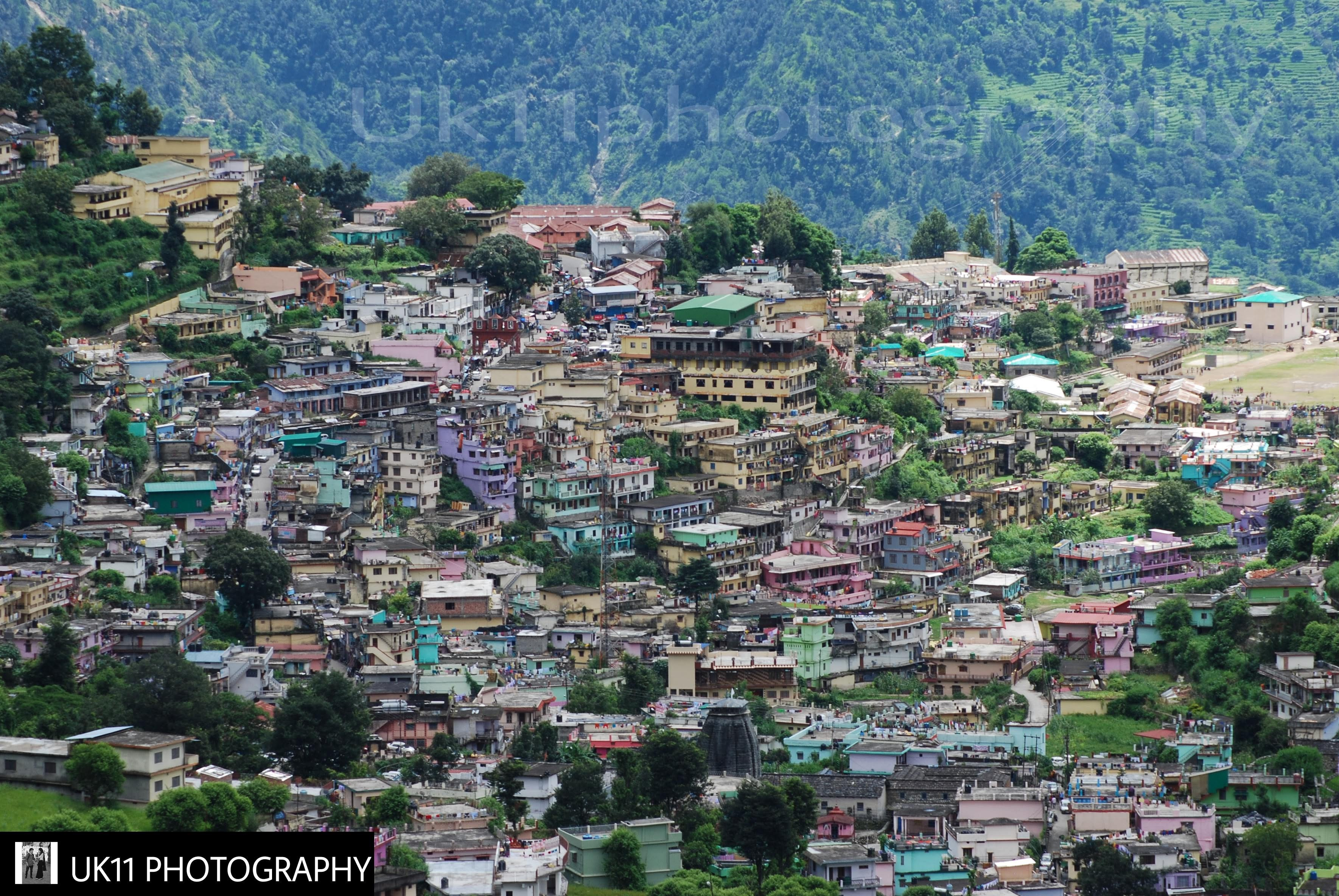

- Location in Uttarakhand, India
- Coordinates: 30.42°N 79.33°E
- Country: India
- State: Uttarakhand
- District: Chamoli

Government
  - Type: Nagar palika

Area
  - Total: 30 km^{2} (12 sq mi)
- Elevation: 1,550 m (5,090 ft)

Population (2011)
  - Total: 21,447

Languages
  - Official: Hindi
- Time zone: UTC+5:30 (IST)
- PIN: 246401
- Vehicle registration: UK-11
- Website: uk.gov.in

Chamoli Gopeshwar is a township in the Garhwal hills and a municipal board within Chamoli district. It is the administrative headquarters of the Chamoli District of Uttarakhand in India and is 1,450 m (4,760 ft) above sea level.

== Geography ==
Gopeshwar is located at 30.42°N 79.33°E. It has an average elevation of 1,450 m (4,760 ft). Gopeshwar is 8.4 km (5.2 mi) away from Chamoli which is located on the banks of Alaknanda river and along NH 58. Gopeswer Uttarakhand

=== Climate ===
Classified by Köppen-Geiger system as humid subtropical climate (Cwa).

Climate data for Chamoli Gopeshwar
Month	Jan	Feb	Mar	Apr	May	Jun	Jul	Aug	Sep	Oct	Nov	Dec	Year
Mean daily maximum °C (°F)	13.4 (56.1)	15.9 (60.6)	20.5 (68.9)	26 (79)	29.3 (84.7)	28.3 (82.9)	25 (77)	24.4 (75.9)	24.2 (75.6)	22.4 (72.3)	18.3 (64.9)	14.8 (58.6)	21.9 (71.4)
Daily mean °C (°F)	8.6 (47.5)	10.4 (50.7)	14.7 (58.5)	19.1 (66.4)	22.5 (72.5)	22.8 (73.0)	21.3 (70.3)	20.9 (69.6)	20.1 (68.2)	17.1 (62.8)	13 (55)	9.8 (49.6)	16.7 (62.0)
Mean daily minimum °C (°F)	3.8 (38.8)	4.9 (40.8)	9 (48)	12.3 (54.1)	15.7 (60.3)	17.4 (63.3)	17.6 (63.7)	17.4 (63.3)	16 (61)	11.8 (53.2)	7.8 (46.0)	4.9 (40.8)	11.5 (52.8)
Average precipitation mm (inches)	74 (2.9)	76 (3.0)	77 (3.0)	36 (1.4)	48 (1.9)	140 (5.5)	322 (12.7)	271 (10.7)	150 (5.9)	66 (2.6)	12 (0.5)	33 (1.3)	1,305 (51.4)
Source: Climate-Data.org

== Places to visit ==
Gopeshwar is a central point for exploring several popular tourist and religious destinations in the surrounding region. Many scenic and spiritual places can be easily accessed from here. Some of the major destinations include:

- Chopta - 39 Km

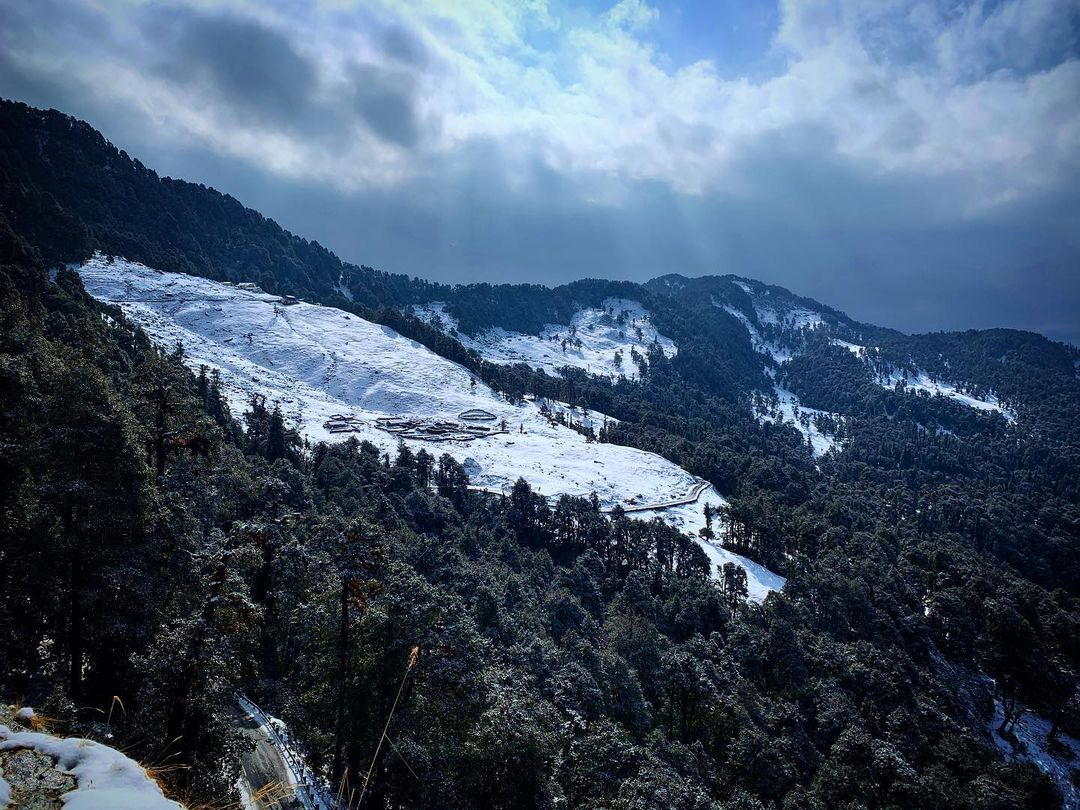
Chopta Bugyal

- Tungnath - 39 Km

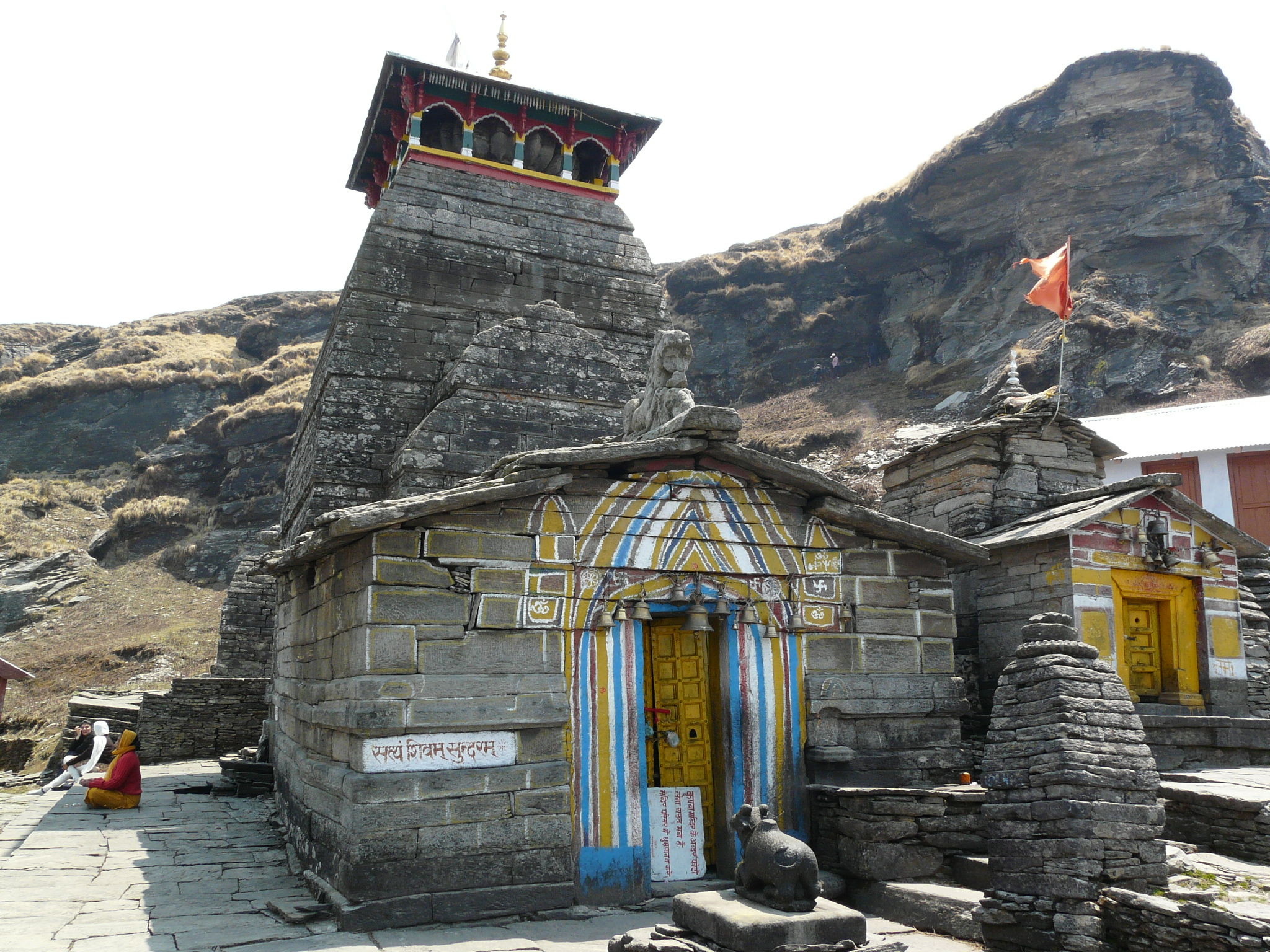
Tungnath Temple

- Mandal Valley - 16 Km

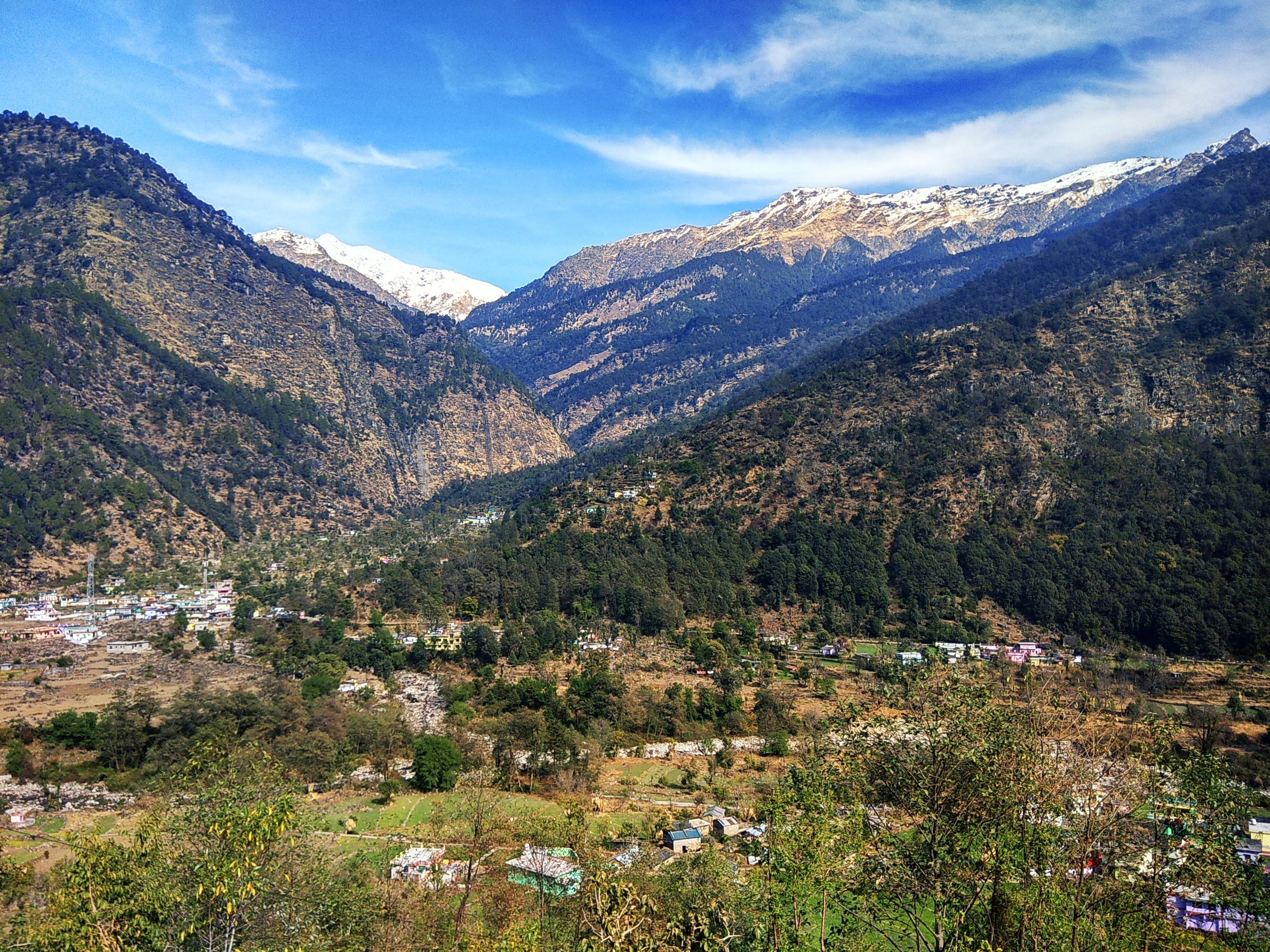
Mandal Valley

- Shri Rudranath, the Fourth Kedar - 4.5 Km

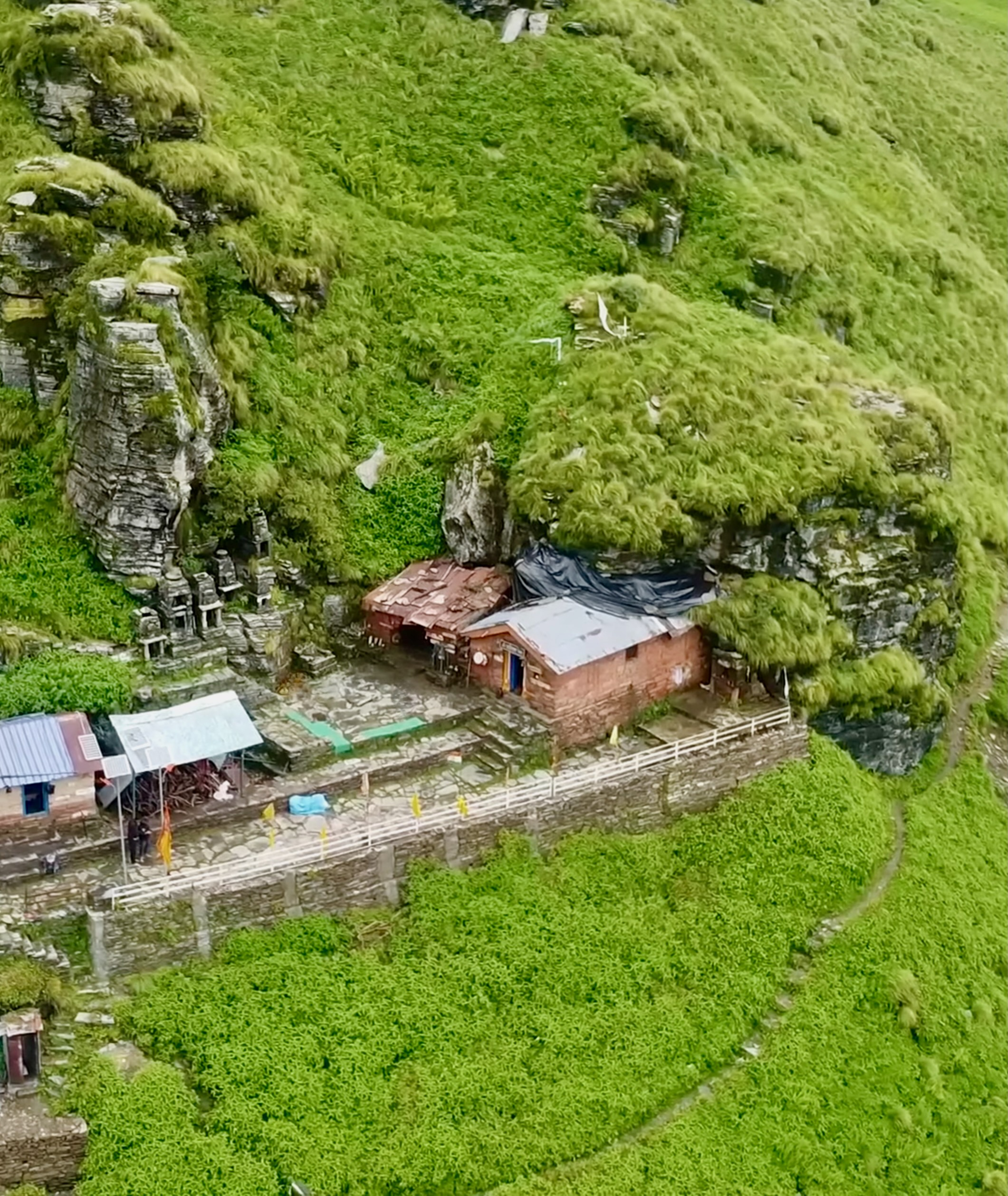
Rudranath Temple

- Gopinath Mahadev Temple - 0 Km

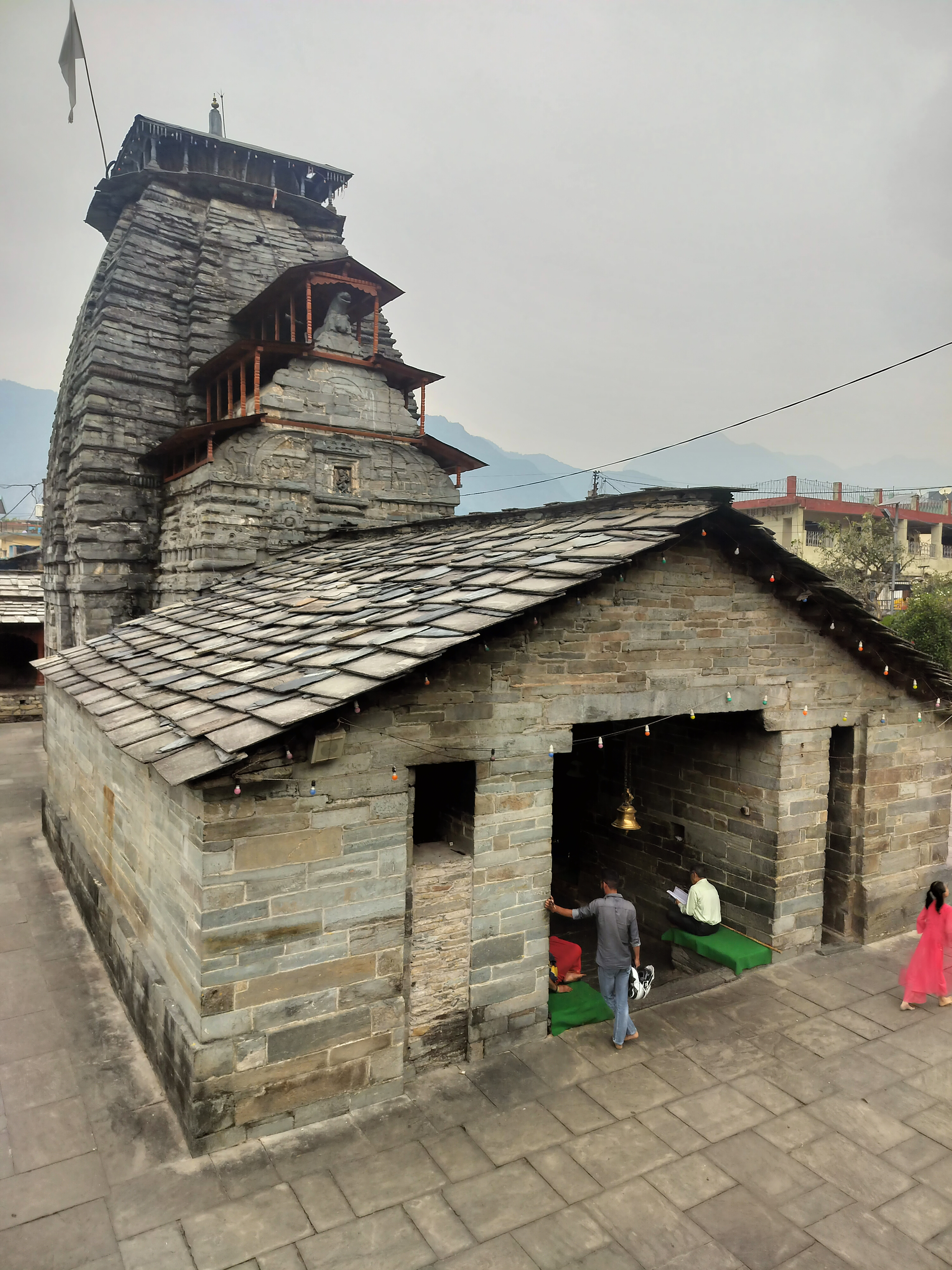

- Kalpeshwar Temple, Fifth Kedar, Urgam - 60 Km

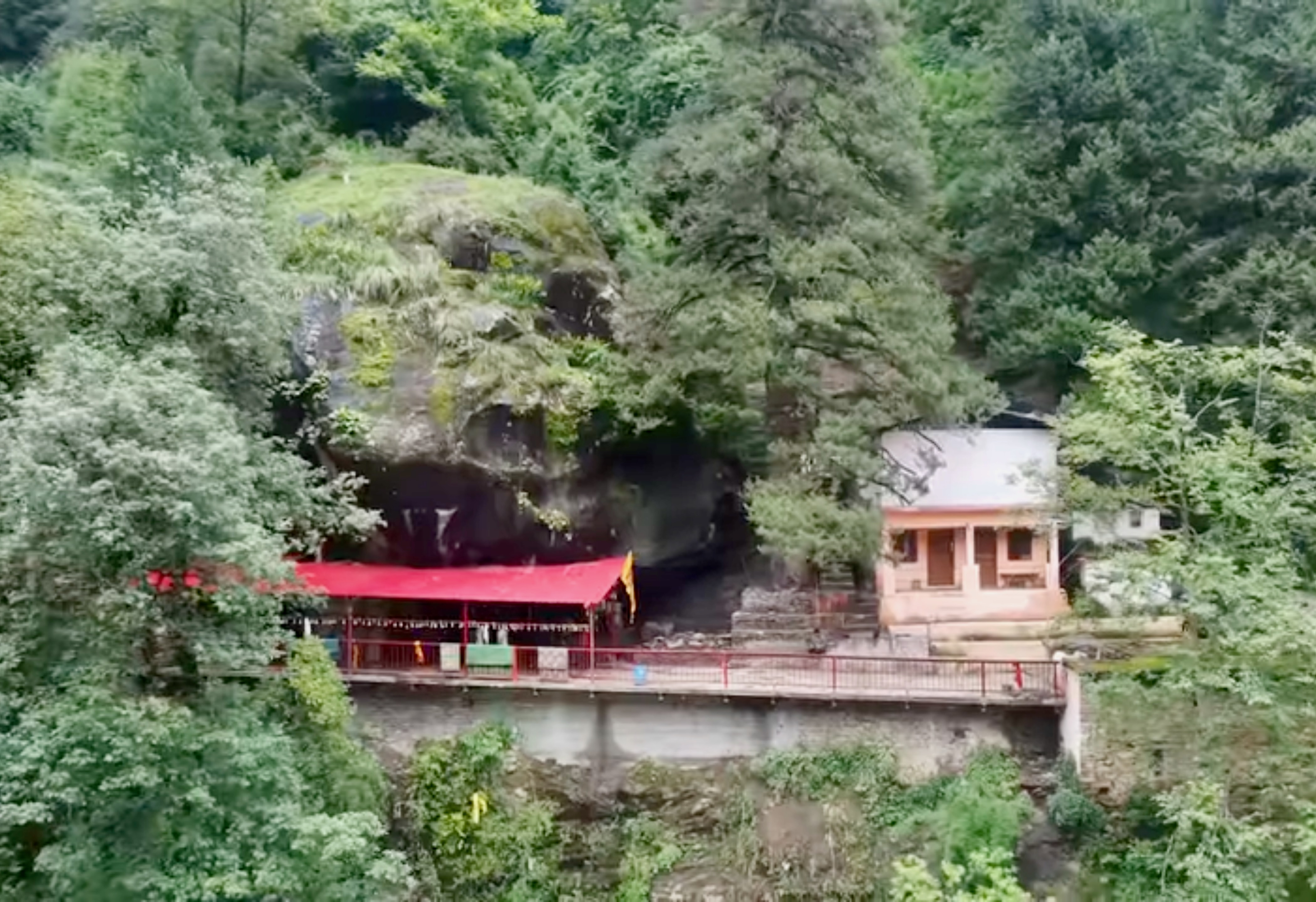
Fifth Kedar Kalpeshwar Mahadev

- Shri Ansuhuya Temple - 16 Km

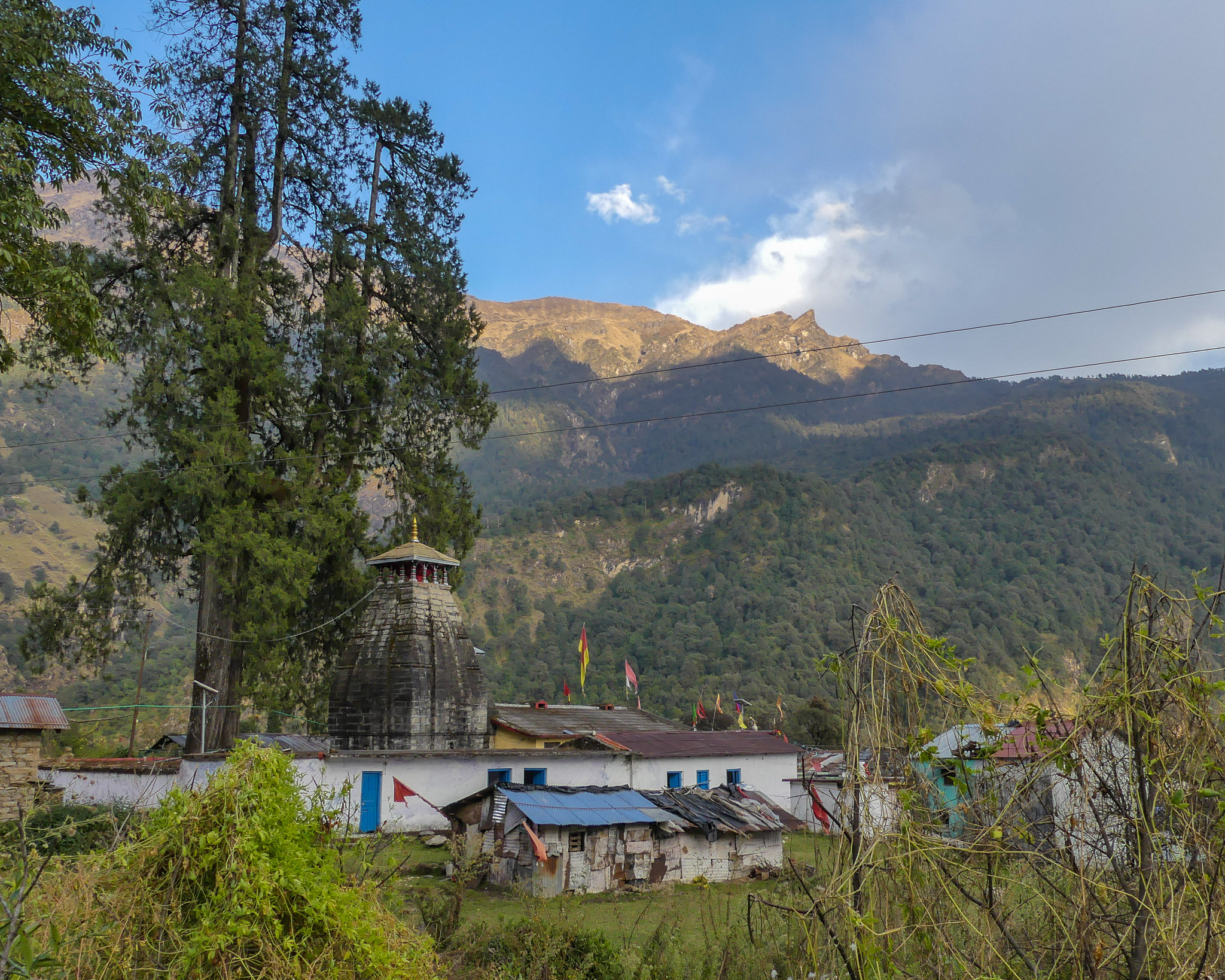
Maa Ansuya Devi Temple

== Demographics ==
According to the 2021 India census, Chamoli Gopeshwar has a population of 41,447. The total number of households are 10513. Males constitute 56% of the population and females 44%. Chamoli Gopeshwar has an average literacy rate of 81%, higher than the national average of 59.5%; with male literacy at 85% and female literacy at 75%. 10% of the population is under 6 years of age.

== Herbal Research and Development Institute ==
Herbal Research and Development Institute (also HRDI) in Gopeshwar Mandal is a government-run research institute founded in 1989 that conserves and studies medicinal herbs found in abundance in the upper regions of Uttarakhand. 18,000 plant species have been identified in the state, and about 1,800 of those are considered to be of medicinal value. Herbs, which are mentioned in Ayurvedic classical texts, continue to play a vital role in the region and are used by traditional local healers for ailments that can usually be cured with modern medicine.
