= Heydenfeldt =

Heydenfeldt is a surname. Notable people with the surname include:

- Bob Heydenfeldt (born 1933), American player of American and Canadian football
- Solomon Heydenfeldt (1816–1890), American lawyer and judge
