= Anton Saurma von der Jeltsch =

German aristocrat and diplomat

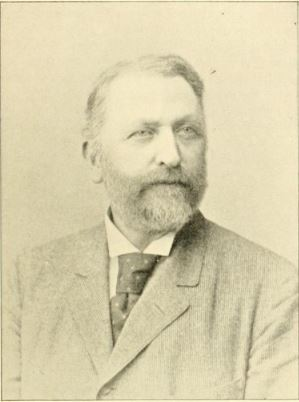

German Ambassador to Italy
- In office 24 November 1897 – 6 July 1899
- Monarch: Wilhelm II
- Preceded by: Bernhard von Bülow
- Succeeded by: Karl von Wedel

German Ambassador to the United States
- In office 1893–1895
- Monarch: Wilhelm II
- Preceded by: Theodor von Holleben (as Minister Plenipotentiary)
- Succeeded by: Max von Thielmann

Personal details
- Born: 27 March 1836 Adelsdorf, Kingdom of Prussia
- Died: 28 April 1900 (aged 64) Brauchitschdorf, Kingdom of Prussia, German Empire
- Parent: Margarete von Hatzfeld zu Wildenburg
- Education: University of Bonn

Johann Anton Freiherr Saurma von der Jeltsch (27 March 1836 – 28 April 1900) was a German aristocrat and diplomat.

== Early life ==
Anton was born on 27 March 1836 in Adelsdorf, Lower Silesia (today part of south-western Poland). He was a son of Freiherr Johann Alexander Saurma von der Jeltsch-Lorzendorf (1804–1841) and the former Freifrau Marie Luise Antonie Anna Franziska von Frankenberg und Ludwigsdorf (1807–1876). His older brother was Johann Josef Arthur Saurma von der Jeltsch-Lorzendorf, who married Laura "Lory" Henckel von Donnersmarck (a daughter of Hugo Henckel von Donnersmarck). His younger brother was the prominent numismatist Hugo von Saurma von der Jeltsch.

His paternal grandparents were Freiherr Johann Anton Saurma von der Jeltsch and Aloysia Gräfin von Hoverden-Plencken. His maternal grandparents were Count Joseph von Frankenberg, Baron von Schellendorf, heir to Warthau and Countess Maria Theresia von Frankenberg (a supporter of Wolfgang Amadeus Mozart).

He studied law at the University of Bonn.

== Career ==
He entered the diplomatic service in 1850, eventually becoming attaché in Paris. In 1866, he took part in the Austro-Prussian War as a Prussian army officer. After the war, he managed the business of various legations and in 1872 he became a legation councilor. In 1873, he was appointed embassy councilor in Constantinople and in 1875, he became German Consul-General in Belgrade, followed by Consul-General and diplomatic agent to Egypt and based in Alexandria in 1879.

In 1882, he became German Ambassador to the Kingdom of Romania in Bucharest and, in 1885, to the Kingdom of the Netherlands in The Hague. In 1891, he became a Prussian envoy to the Kingdom of Württemberg in Stuttgart. In 1893, he became the first German Ambassador to the United States, replacing Minister Baron von Holleben, who took his old post in Stuttgart. (Note: In August 1897, Baron Theodor von Holleben returned to Washington as the German Ambassador to the United States, replacing Max von Thielmann, Baron Saurma's successor.) Before taking his post in Washington, D.C., he traveled to New York City with Baron Clemens von Ketteler, the Counselor and First Secretary to the German Embassy, where they toured the city, visiting the New York Stock Exchange and the obelisk known as Cleopatra's Needle in Central Park, which he had seen while stationed in Egypt. In Washington, the Ambassador resided at 1435 Massachusetts Avenue which was bought by the German government a few months before his arrival. In November 1894, he was among the guests who dined with President Cleveland's Solicitor General Lawrence Maxwell Jr., including Secretary of State Walter Q. Gresham and Justice Stephen Johnson Field. In 1895, he was replaced by Max von Thielmann.

In 1895, he returned to Constantinople to serve as German Ambassador to the Ottoman Empire. In his report about the treatment of the Armenians, Anton:

"stressed how nonsensical he found both the demonstration and the demands of the Armenians, drew particular attention to the role of the police force. He wrote that the police did not only tolerate 'that the population was massacring the Armenians, but was cheering them on and took part itself in the slaughtering of already heavily wounded and tied-up Armenians.' He also described how "Armenians were then even 'raided and slaughtered' in their own homes."

He was replaced in Constantinople by Baron Adolf Marschall von Bieberstein, the former German Minister for Foreign Affairs, in 1897. From 1897 to 1899, he was the German Ambassador to Italy in Rome, where he replaced Bernhard von Bülow who succeeded von Bieberstein as the Emperor's Minister for Foreign Affairs. Saurma von der Jeltsch retired in 1899, shortly before his death in April 1900.

== Personal life ==
Anton was married to Margarete von Hatzfeldt zu Trachenberg (1850–1923), a daughter of Pauline de Castellane and Count Max von Hatzfeldt, who spent ten years from 1849 to 1859 as the German Minister to France and who signed the Treaty of Paris in 1856 which ended the Crimean War. After her father's death, her mother remarried to Louis de Talleyrand-Périgord, duc de Valençay, 3rd duc de Talleyrand-Périgord. Her elder sister, Hélène, was the wife of Georg von Kanitz (aide de camp to Prince Friedrich Karl of Prussia). Together, they were the parents of two children:

- Freiherr Maximilian Saurma von der Jeltsch (1873–1949), who married Anne Marie Strachwitz von Groß-Zauche und Camminetz.
- Freifrau Carmen Saurma von der Jeltsch (1875–1952), who was given a ball in Washington for her debut while her father was Ambassador. (Note: Among the guests at Baroness Carmen's debut at the German Embassy in Washington, D.C. on 8 January 1895 were the English Ambassador Lord Pauncefort and Lady Pauncefote and the Misses Pauncefote, Hugh Gough and Lady Georgiana Gough (a daughter of the 4th Earl of Longford), Bax Ironsides, Cecil Spring Rice, Count Sierstorpff, Baron Uechtritz, Prince Iturbide, the Brazilian Minister and Mme. Mendonça, the Turkish Minister, the Spanish Minister Railie de Muruaga, and the Danish Minister Constantin Brun, the Italian Ambassador Saverio Fava and Baroness Fava, the Nicaraguan Minister and Mme. Guzman, the Netherlands Minister William Ferdinand Henry von Weckherlin, Belgian Minister Count G. de Lichtervelde, and Swedish Minister Johan Anton Wolff Grip, the Mexican Minister Matías Romero and Mme. Romero, Mr. and Mrs. S. S. Howland, Secretary Hilary A. Herbert and Miss Herbert, Mrs. Don Cameron and Miss Rachel Cameron, the Misses Patten, Dr. Tavel and Mr. Vogel of the Swiss legation, Count de Chambrun and M. Le Favre of the French Embassy, the Austrian Minister Ladislaus Hengelmüller von Hengervár and Baroness von Hengelmüller, Hobart and Rose Farwell Chatfield-Taylor, Senator Edward O. Wolcott and Mrs. Wolcott, Marquis Imperiali, Miss Biddle, Senator James McMillan and Mrs. and Miss McMillan, Mr. Waterbury, the Misses Boardman, Assistant Secretary of State Rockhill and Mrs. Rockhill, and Count Széchenyi.) She later married Stanislaus Graf Hoyos, Freiherr zu Stichsenstein.

Baron Von der Jeltsch died on 28 April 1900 in Brauchitschdorf.

== Orders and decorations ==
- Kingdom of Prussia:
  - Knight of the Order of the Red Eagle, 2nd Class with Oak Leaves and Star
  - Knight of the Royal Order of the Crown, 1st Class
  - Landeswehr Service Medal, 1st Class
- Austrian Empire: Grand Cross of the Imperial Austrian Order of Franz Joseph
- Luxembourg:
  - Grand Cross of the Order of the Oak Crown
  - Grand Cross of the Order of Civil and Military Merit of Adolph of Nassau
- Ottoman Empire:
  - Order of Osmanieh, 1st Class in Diamonds
  - Order of the Medjidie, 1st Class in Diamonds
- Kingdom of Romania: Grand Cross of the Order of the Star of Romania
- Sweden: Commander Grand Cross of the Royal Order of the Polar Star
