= Wilhelm von Perponcher-Sedlnitzky =

Dutch-German diplomat

Count Wilhelm Heinrich Ludwig Arend von Perponcher-Sedlnitzky (17 July 1819 – 24 June 1893) was a Dutch-German diplomat.

== Early life ==
Coat of arms of the de Perponcher Sedlnitsky family

Perponcher was born in Berlin on 17 July 1819. He was the eldest son of Count Hendrik George de Perponcher Sedlnitsky (1771–1856), a Dutch general and diplomat, and Countess Wilhelmina Frederika Adelaide van Reede Ginkel. Among his siblings were Friedrich von Perponcher-Sedlnitzky (Oberhofmarschall of Kaiser Wilhelm I), who married Countess Wanda Friederike Ottilie Hedwig von Moltke, and Ludwig von Perponcher-Sedlnitzky, who married Countess Adelheid von Bülow.

His paternal grandparents were Baron Cornelis de Perponcher Sedlnitsky, (scion of an old Huguenot Dutch family and of old Czech noble family that had fled Bohemia after the 1621 Battle of White Mountain), a justice in the Hof van Holland (the high court of the province of Holland), and Jonkvrouwe Johanna Maria van Tuyll van Serooskerke. His maternal grandparents were Arend Willem van Reede van Amerongen and Wilhelmina Carolina Elisabeth Albertina Charlotte von Krusemarck. In 1853, he was recognized as belonging to the Prussian nobility with the title of Count.

== Career ==
Perponcher was a Royal Prussian chamberlain and, in 1853, became a Prussian diplomatic representative with the rank of Minister Resident in the Duchy of Nassau and the Free City of Frankfurt. In 1860, he became Envoy to the Kingdom of the Two Sicilies at Naples, followed by Envoy to Munich in 1862, Envoy to The Hague in 1863 and then to Brussels. On 5 June 1869, King William III of the Netherlands appointed him Grand Cross of the Order of the Oak Crown. In 1875, Perponcher retired from public life.

== Personal life ==
In 1853, Perponcher was married to Countess Antoinette Louise Emilie Julie von Maltzan, Baroness of Wartenburg and Penzlin (1825–1899), a daughter of Count Mortimer von Maltzan and Countess Augusta von der Goltz. Antoinette served as Chief Court Mistress of Empress Augusta. Together, they were the parents of:

- Alexander Heinrich Georg Wilhelm von Perponcher-Sedlnitzky (1854–1937), who married Róża Zofia Maria Żeleńska.
- Georg Wilhelm Louis von Perponcher-Sedlnitzky (1856–1863), who died young.
- Elisabeth Victoria Adelaide Charlotte von Perponcher-Sedlnitzky (1858–1894), who married Prince Gebhard Lebrecht Blücher von Wahlstatt, son of Prince Gebhard Bernhard von Blücher von Wahlstatt (a grandson of Gebhard Leberecht von Blücher).
- August Victor Friedrich Wilhelm von Perponcher-Sedlnitzky (1861–1900)
- Wilhelm Ernst Robert Heinrich von Perponcher-Sedlnitzky (b. 1862)

Perponcher died on 24 June 1893 in Neudorf, Saxony-Anhalt.

=== Descendants ===
Through his daughter Elisabeth, he was a grandfather of Prince Gebhard Blücher von Wahlstatt (1865–1931), who married diarist Evelyn Stapleton-Bretherton in 1907.
