= Villa Mettlen =

Country estate in Muri bei Bern, Switzerland

Coordinates: 46°55′43″N 7°28′56″E

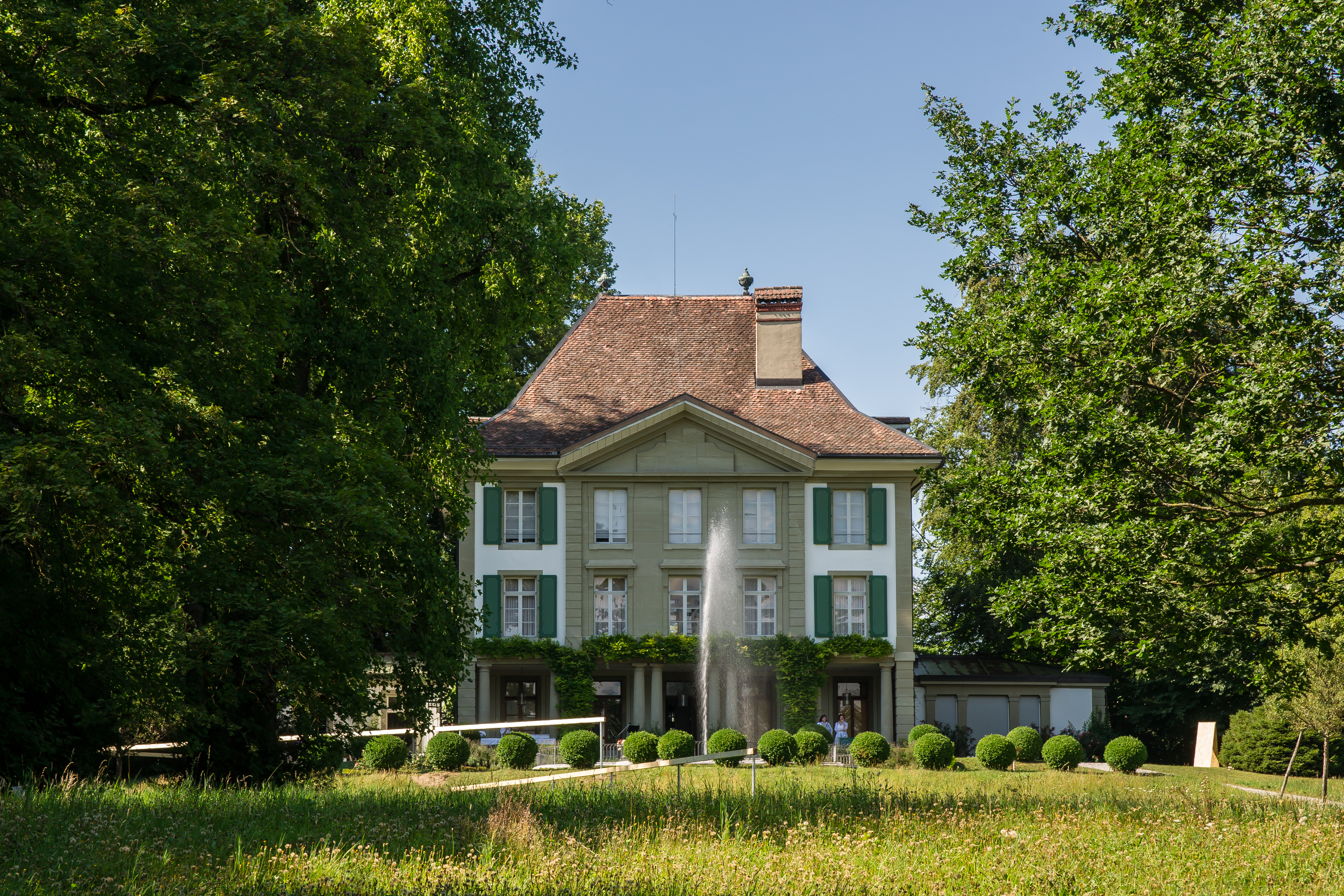
Villa Mettlen (2015).

The Villa Mettlen is a country estate in the municipality of Muri bei Bern in the Canton of Bern in Switzerland. The grounds comprise 15,466 m^{2}, of which the building footprint is 499 m^{2}.

== History ==
The first documented evidence of Mettlengut is in 1650. The first Lord was Samuel Ougspurger, who was married to Jacqueline de Graffenried. Around 1750, Johann Albrecht von Steiger improved the estate with money and artistic flair, as have other owners who have left their mark, most notably Count Friedrich von Pourtalès in the 19th century (who also owned Schloss Glumbowitz).

In the 1960s, then current owner César Gustav Tauber sold the estate to the municipality of Muri, on condition that it be remodeled into a cultural center.

Since 1970, the villa has been the headquarters of the Muri-Gümligen music school. The ground floor and vaulted cellars can be rented for private events such as birthday parties, corporate conferences or weddings.
