= Minutoli =

Minutoli is a surname. Notable people with the surname include:

- The von Minutoli family of Switzerland, which includes
  - Heinrich Menu von Minutoli (1772–1846), Prussian Generalmajor, explorer and archaeologist
  - Julius Rudolph Ottomar Freiherr von Minutoli (1804–1860), Prussian chief of police, diplomat, scientist, and author, and draughtsman
- Enrico Minutoli (died 1412), Italian Cardinal
- Michael Minutoli, inventor of the Minutoli instrument, a modified phonograph turntable used by noise performer Emil Beaulieau
