= Rudolf Friedrich Le Maistre =

Saxon and Imperial German diplomat

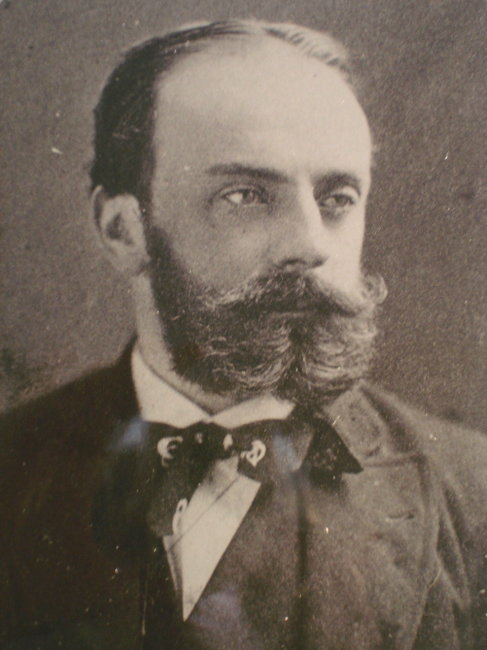
- Photograph of Le Maistre, between 1868 and 1875

Ambassador of the German Empire in Athens
- In office 1887–1890
- Preceded by: Egon von den Brincken
- Succeeded by: Ludwig von Wesdehlen

Ambassador of the German Empire in Rio de Janeiro
- In office 1879–1886
- Preceded by: Heinrich von Beust
- Succeeded by: Otto Magnus von Dönhoff

Ambassador of the German Empire in Buenos Aires and Montevideo
- In office 1869–1875
- Preceded by: Friedrich von Gülich
- Succeeded by: Theodor von Holleben

Ambassador of the Kingdom of Saxony in Vienna
- In office 1866–1869
- Preceded by: Rudolf von Könneritz
- Succeeded by: Carl Gustav Adolf von Bose

Personal details
- Born: 10 February 1835; Dresden, Kingdom of Saxony
- Died: 1 April 1903 (aged 68); Dresden, German Empire
- Relations: Wilhelm Christian Benecke von Gröditzberg (grandfather)
- Parent(s): Johann Friedrich Le Maistre; Elisabeth Helene Benecke von Gröditzberg

Rudolf Friedrich Le Maistre (10 February 1835 - 1 April 1903) was a Saxon and Imperial German diplomat.

== Early life ==
Le Maistre was born in Dresden in the Kingdom of Saxony on 10 February 1835. He was a son of diplomat Johann Friedrich Le Maistre (1790–1874) and Elisabeth Helene Benecke von Gröditzberg (b. 1810), who married in 1833.

His maternal grandfather was Wilhelm Christian Benecke von Gröditzberg, the German banker, merchant, estate owner and art collector (who had been ennobled in 1829 as Benecke von Gröditzberg, after he had bought the fief Gröditzberg).

== Career ==
Le Maistre was a Privy Legation Councilor. On 5 March 1869, King Frederick William IV appointed the Royal Saxon legation councilor Le Maistre as Minister-Resident of the North German Confederation to the governments of the Argentine Confederation and the Republic of Uruguay. Le Maistre presented his letter of accreditation to the government of Domingo Faustino Sarmiento in Argentina on 5 March 1869 and to the government of Lorenzo Batlle y Grau in Uruguay on 22 March 1869.

In 1882, Le Maistre was Emperor William I's Envoy Extraordinary and Minister Plenipotentiary to Empero Pedro II and negotiated a consular treaty with Brazil. From 1887 to 1890, he was the Envoy of the German Empire in Athens.

== Personal life ==
Le Maistre died in Dresden on 1 April 1903 and was buried at Trinity Cemetery there.

Diplomatic posts
Preceded by Rudolf von Könneritz	Ambassador of the Kingdom of Saxony in Vienna; 1866–1869	Succeeded by Carl Gustav Adolf von Bose
Preceded by Friedrich von Gülich	Ambassador of the German Empire in Buenos Aires and Montevideo; 1869–1875	Succeeded by Theodor von Holleben
Preceded by Heinrich von Beust	Ambassador of the German Empire in Rio de Janeiro; 1879–1886	Succeeded by Otto Magnus von Dönhoff
Preceded by Egon von den Brincken	Ambassador of the German Empire in Athens; 1887–1890	Succeeded by Ludwig von Wesdehlen
