= List of ambassadors of Germany to Greece =

List of German ambassadors in Greece contains the highest-ranking representatives of the North German Confederation, the German Empire, the Federal Republic of Germany and other German states (until 1871) in Greece. The embassy is based in Athens.

== Envoys from the German States (before 1871) ==
=== Bavarian envoys ===
Relations between Bavaria and Greece were established in 1835.

Name	Image	Term Start	Term End	Notes
Egid von Kobell		1835		
Klemens von Waldkirch		1837	1841	
Otto von Bray-Steinburg		1841	1843	Also served as Minister-President of Bavaria
Carl von Grasser		1843	1847	
Maximilian Joseph Pergler von Perglas		1847	1853	Also served as Envoy to France
Wolfgang von Thüngen		1853	1854	
Maximilian von Feder		1855	1859	
Ferdinand von Hompesch-Bollheim		1859	1863	

=== Prussian envoys ===
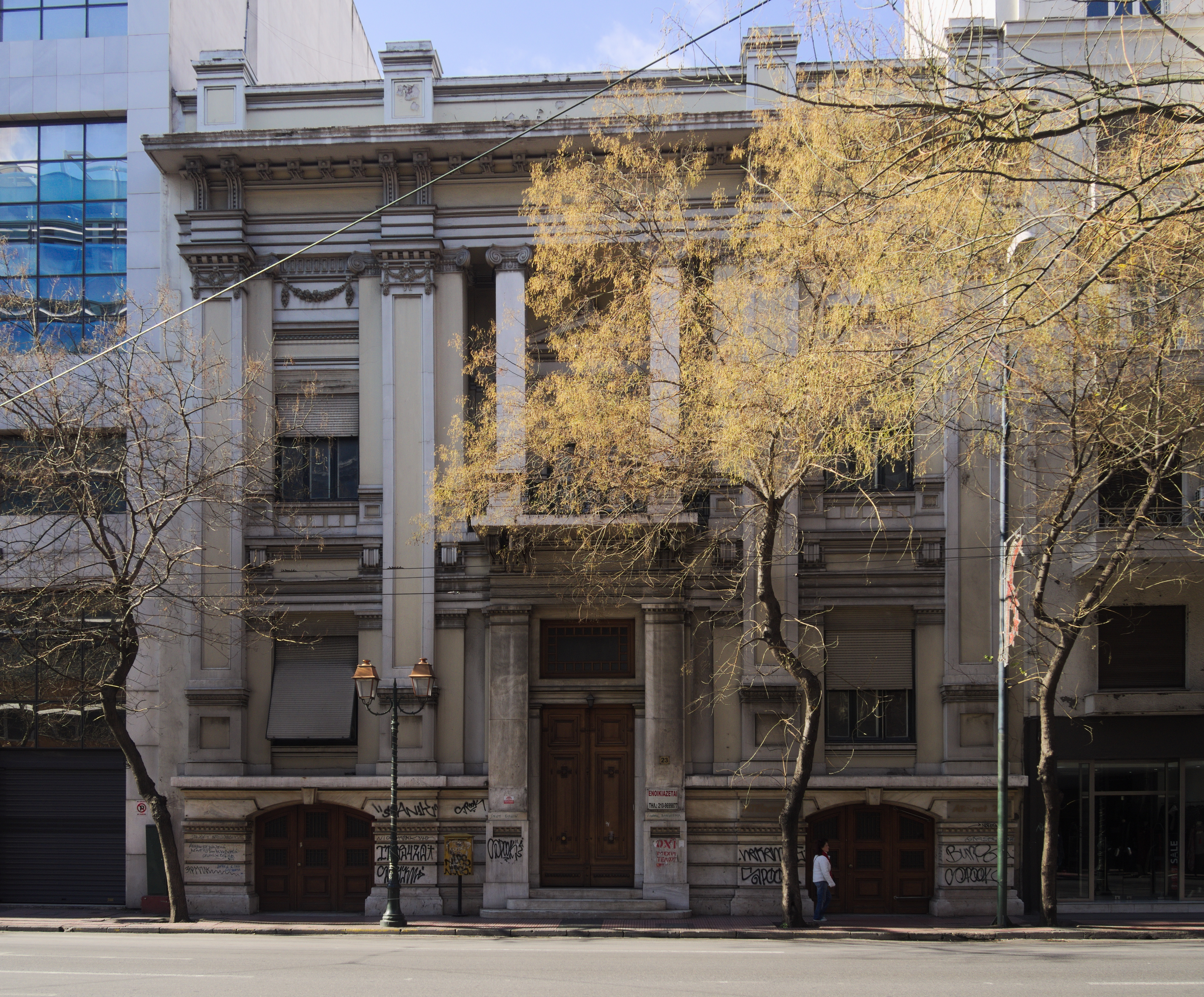
The building of the Prussian legation at Akadimias 23

Relations between Prussia and Greece were established in 1834.

Name	Image	Term Start	Term End	Notes
Friedrich Wilhelm Ludwig August von Lusi		1834	1838	
Joseph Maria Anton Brassier de Saint-Simon-Vallade		1838	1844	
Karl von Werther		1844	1850	
Louis von Wildenbruch		1850	1852	
Hermann von Thile		1852	1854	
Robert von der Goltz		1855	1859	
Georg von Werthern		1860	1862	
Heinrich von Keyserlingk-Rautenburg		1862	1865	
Johann Emil von Wagner		1865	1868	

== Ambassadors of the North German Confederation ==
Name	Image	Term Start	Term End	Notes
Chlodwig zu Hohenlohe-Schillingsfürst		1848	1849	

== Ambassadors of the German Empire ==
Name	Image	Term Start	Term End	Notes
Johann Emil von Wagner		1868	1874	
Joseph Maria von Radowitz Jr.		1874	1882	
Egon von den Brincken		1882	1887	
Rudolf Friedrich Le Maistre		1887	1890	
Ludwig von Wesdehlen		1890	1894	
Ludwig von Plessen-Cronstern		1894	1902	
Max von Ratibor und Corvey		1902	1906	
Emmerich von Arco-Valley		1906	1908	
Hans von Wangenheim		1909	1912	
Albert von Quadt-Wykradt-Isny		1912	1915	
Wilhelm von Mirbach-Harff		1915	1916	Envoy
Ludwig von Spee		1921	1922	Envoy Extraordinary and Minister Plenipotentiary
Hans von Schoen		1922	1926	
Martin Renner		1926	1929	Envoy
Radolf von Kardorff		1929	1931	
Ernst Eisenlohr		1931	1936	Envoy
Viktor zu Erbach-Schönberg		1936	1941	Ambassador

== Ambassadors of the Federal Republic of Germany ==
Name	Image	Term Start	Term End	Notes
Werner von Grundherr zu Altenthann und Weiherhaus		1951	1954	
Theodor Kordt		1953	1958	
Gebhard Seelos		1958	1961	
Wilhelm Melchers		1961	1964	
Oskar Hermann Artur Schlitter		1964	1969	
Peter Limbourg		1969	1972	
Dirk Oncken		1972	1977	Father of diplomat Emily Haber
Gisbert Poensgen		1977	1979	
Helmut Sigrist		1979	1984	
Rüdiger von Pachelbel		1984	1988	
Werner Ludwig Botho Hubertus von der Schulenburg		1988	1991	
Leopold Bill von Bredow		1991	1996	
Friedrich Reiche		1996	1999	
Karl Heinz Kuhna		1999	2002	
Albert Spiegel		2002	2005	
Wolfgang Schultheiss		2005	2010	
Roland Michael Wegener		2010	2012	
Wolfgang Dold		2012	2013	
Peter Schoof		2014	2017	
Jens Plötner		2017	2019	
Ernst Reichel		2019	2023	
Andreas Kindl		2023	Present	

== See also ==
- Greek-German relations
- Embassy of Germany, Athens
