= List of ambassadors of Germany to Argentina =

The following is a list of German ambassadors in Argentina. The seat of the embassy is the German Embassy in Buenos Aires.

== History ==
The Embassy of the Federal Republic of Germany is led by Ambassador Dieter Lamlé and is located at Villanueva 1055, C1426BMC Buenos Aires. There are Honorary Consuls in Córdoba, El Calafate, Eldorado, Mendoza, Posadas, Salta, San Carlos de Bariloche, San Miguel de Tucumán, and Ushuaia.

== Heads of missions ==
Name	Image	Term Start	Term End	Notes
Kingdom of Prussia
Friedrich von Gülich (1820–1903)		1857	1868	
North German Confederation
Rudolf Friedrich Le Maistre (1835–1903)		1868	1871	Also Minister-Resident for the Republic of Uruguay
/ / / German Empire
Rudolf Friedrich Le Maistre (1835–1903)		1871	1875	
Theodor von Holleben (1838–1913)		1875	1885	
Wolfram von Rotenhan (1845–1912)		1885	1890	
Friedrich Richard Krauel (1848–1918)		1890	1894	
Karl August von der Goltz		1894	1896	
Friedrich von Mentzingen (1858–1922)		1896	1899	
Ernst von Treskow (1844–1915)		1899	1901	Envoy
Hans von Wangenheim (1859–1915)		1901	1904	
Julius von Waldthausen (1858–1935)		1904	1910	
Hilmar Freiherr von dem Bussche-Haddenhausen (* 1867; † 1939)		1910	1914	
Karl von Luxburg (1872–1956)		1914	1917	
Franz Olshausen (1872–1962)		1920	1920	Husband of Käthe Olshausen-Schönberger
Adolf Pauli (1860–1947)		1920	1924	
Carl Richard Gneist (1868–1939)		1924	1928	Envoy Extraordinary
Friedrich von Keller (1873–1960)		1928	1933	Chargé d'Affaires
Heinrich von Kaufmann-Asser (1882–1954)		1933		
Edmund Freiherr von Thermann (1884–1951)		1933	1942	
Erich Otto Meynen (1890–1954)		1942	1944	
/ Federal Republic of Germany
Hermann Terdenge (1882–1959)		1951	1955	
Werner Junker (1902–1990)		1955	1963	
Ernst-Günther Mohr (1904–1991)		1963	1969	
Luitpold Werz (1907–1973)		1969	1972	
Horst-Krafft Robert (1920–2009)		1972	1975	
Jörg Kastl (1922–2014)		1975	1977	
Joachim Jaenicke (1915–2007)		1977	1980	
Paul Verbeek (1925–2019)		1980	1984	
Hans-Werner Graf Finck von Finckenstein (1926–2012)		1984	1987	
Herbert Limmer (1930–2023)		1987	1993	
Wiegand Pabsch (1932–2023)		1993	1997	
Adolf von Wagner (1935–2023)		1997	2000	
Hans-Ulrich Spohn (b. 1938)		2000	2003	
Rolf Schumacher (b. 1943)		2003	2008	
Günter Rudolf Knieß (b. 1951)		2008	2012	
Bernhard Graf von Waldersee (b. 1952)		2012	2017	
Jürgen Christian Mertens (b. 1953)		2017	2020	
Ulrich A. Sante (b. 1957)		2020	2023	
Dieter Lamlé (b. 1960)		2023	Present	

== See also ==
- Argentina–Germany relations
