= List of ambassadors of Germany to Chile =

The list of German ambassadors in Chile contains the highest-ranking representatives of the German Empire and the Federal Republic of Germany in Chile. The embassy is located in Santiago de Chile.

== German Empire ==
Name	Image	Term Start	Term End	Notes
Carl Ferdinand Levenhagen		1871	1877	Resident Minister
Friedrich von Gülich		1877	1881	Resident Minister
Gustav Adolf Schenck zu Schweinsberg		1881	1886	Resident Minister
Felix von Gutschmid		1886	1892	Resident Minister, from 1887 Envoy
Ernst von Treskow		1891	1899	Envoy
Oscar Stübel		1889	1900	Envoy
Albrecht von Voigts-Rhetz		1900	1901	Envoy
Siegfried Friedrich Kasimir zu Castell-Rüdenhausen		1901	1903	Envoy
Franz von Reichenau		1903	1907	Envoy
Hans Philipp Leopold von und zu Bodman		1907	1910	Envoy
Friedrich Karl von Erckert		1910	1919	Envoy
Otto Gumprecht		1919	1921	Acting
Friedrich Karl von Erckert		1921	1923	Envoy
Ludwig Graf von Spee		1923	1928	Envoy
Franz Olshausen		1928	1932	Envoy
Hans Kurd von Reiswitz und Kaderžin		1932	1934	Envoy
Wilhelm Albrecht von Schoen		1934	1943	Envoy, from 1936 Ambassador
Breaking off diplomatic relations on 20 January 1943

== Federal Republic of Germany ==
Name	Image	Term Start	Term End	Notes
Carl von Campe		1952	1959	
Hans Strack		1959	1964	
Gottfried von Nostitz-Drzewiecky		1964	1967	
Rudolf Salat		1967	1970	
Horst Osterheld		1970	1971	
Lothar Lahn		1971	1973	
Kurt Luedde-Neurath		1973	1976	
Erich Strätling		1976	1979	
Heinz Dittmann		1979	1983	
Hermann Holzheimer		1983	1986	
Horst Kullak-Ublick		1986	1988	
Günter Knackstedt		1988	1989	
Wiegand Pabsch		1990	1993	
Werner Reichenbaum		1993	1997	
Horst Palenberg		1997	2000	
Georg Clemens Dick		2000	2003	
Joachim Schmillen		2003	2006	
Peter Scholz		2006	2008	
Michael Glotzbach		2008	2012	
Hans Henning Blomeyer-Bartenstein		2012	2015	
Rolf Schulze		2015	2019	
Christian Hellbach		2019	2022	
Irmgard Maria Fellner		2022	2024	
Susanne Fries-Gaier		2024	Present	

== See also ==
- Chile-Germany relations
