= Franz von Reichenau =

German diplomat and jurist

- Photograph of Franz von Reichenau

Ambassador of the German Empire to Sweden
- In office 1911–1914
- Preceded by: Carl Erdmann von Pückler-Burghauss
- Succeeded by: Hellmuth Lucius von Stoedten

Ambassador of the German Empire to Serbia
- In office 1909–1911
- Preceded by: Ludwig von Wäcker-Gotter
- Succeeded by: Friedrich von Keller

Ambassador of the German Empire to Brazil
- In office 1907–1908
- Preceded by: Karl Georg von Treutler
- Succeeded by: Emmerich von Arco-Valley

Ambassador of the German Empire to Chile
- In office 1903–1907
- Preceded by: Siegfried Friedrich Kasimir zu Castell-Rüdenhausen
- Succeeded by: Hans Philipp Leopold von und zu Bodman

Personal details
- Born: 6 October 1857 Wiesbaden, Grand Duchy of Hesse
- Died: 31 March 1940 (aged 82)
- Spouse: Käthe Peipers
- Occupation: Diplomat

Franz von Reichenau (6 October 1857 – 31 March 1940) was a German diplomat and jurist.

== Early life ==
Franz von Reichenau was born on 6 October 1857 in Wiesbaden. He was a son of the Prussian administrative director Fritz von Reichenau. From 1878 to 1880 he studied law in Strasbourg and Berlin.

== Diplomatic career ==
From 1903 to 1907 he was the German ambassador to the government of Germán Riesco Errázuriz in Santiago de Chile and at the same time accredited to the government of Manuel José Estrada Cabrera in Guatemala . From 1907 to 1908 he was ambassador in Rio de Janeiro where he played a leading role in negotiations related to the laying of sub-sea trans-Atlantic cables. During his time in Brazil von Reichenau criticised the lack of German investment in the country and warned that US investment in railways threatened Germany's pre-eminent position in Southern Brazil. From 1909 to 1911 ambassador in Belgrade and from 1911 to 1914 ambassador in Stockholm.

His time as ambassador to Sweden was particularly fraught, as he engaged in a number of attempts to persuade the Swedish government to side with Germany in the First World War. Eventually he was expelled by the Swedish government for this. He was a strong support of Wilhelmine governance and an opponent of parliamentarism, and even considered that Sweden might one day be part of the German Empire. His replacement in the role was Helmuth Lucius von Stoedten, an opponent of Swedish activism. During the First World War von Reichenau also advocated the bombing of the UK by airships and aircraft.

=== Later life ===
After his expulsion from Sweden, von Reichenau became head of the Verein für das Deutschtum im Ausland (Union for Germanness abroad), or VDA. He remained in this role for the remainder of the war, and was head of the VDA that was re-established in 1920. Von Reichenau believed that Germany was in a struggle against enemies who wished to destroy German culture, and as such promotion of a völkisch, or nationalistic mentality amongst Germans was important.

Von Reichenau was an early supporter of Adolf Hitler. Comments in support of Hitler appear in Nazi pamphlets distributed in 1932, including a description of Hitler by von Reichenau saying Hitler was "a political thinker of extraordinary stature".

== Personal life ==
In 1919 he and his wife Käthe (née Peipers) acquired Rotenberg Castle, which he finished rebuilding in 1922. He financed various infrastructure projects, such as the construction of Schlossstrasse and Oberer Schlossstraße 1921-1923. The gratitude of the people of Rotenberg is expressed to this day in the memorial stone for road construction (which was set up in the second turn opposite the castle): "This way was built 1921/22 under Mayor Menges of Rotenberg municipality and the lord of the castle Excellency von Reichenau, by the Water and Road Construction Office Sinsheim". The street between Hofacker and the Schloßstraße, which leads to the castle, bears the name "Von Reichenau Street", which is another sign of gratitude to von Reichenau visible to this day.
