= List of ambassadors of Germany to Serbia =

The list of German ambassadors in Serbia contains the highest-ranking representatives of the German Empire and the Federal Republic of Germany in Serbia.

The country was known as Serbia until 1918, then Yugoslavia from 1918 to 2003, as Serbia and Montenegro from 2003 to 2006, and today, is Serbia. The German embassy is at Kneza Miloša Street 74–76, 11000 Belgrade.

== List of representatives ==
Ambassador	Image	Diplomatic accreditation	Term End
/ German Empire
Anton Saurma von der Jeltsch		1875	1876
Hippolyt von Bray-Steinburg		1876	1891
Ludwig von Wäcker-Gotter		1891	1902
Franz von Reichenau		1909	1911
Friedrich von Keller		1918	1921
Adolf Köster		1928	1930
Federal Republic of Germany
Robert Ulrich		1951	1952
Heinrich von Hardenberg		1952	1953
Hans Kroll		1953	1954
Karl Georg Pfleiderer		1955	1957
Disruption of relationship (1957–1968)
Peter Blachstein		1968	1969
Joachim Jaenicke		1970	1974
Jesco von Puttkamer		1975	1979
Horst Grabert		1979	1984
Gisela Rheker		1984	1987
Hansjörg Eiff		1988	1992
Gerhard Enver Schrömbgens (chargé d'affaires)		1992	1996
Wilfried Gruber		1996	1999
Joachim Schmidt		2000	2002
Kurt Leonberger		2002	2004
Andreas Zobel		2005	2007
Wolfram Maas		2007	2012
Heinz Wilhelm		2012	2015
Axel Dittmann		2015	2018
Thomas Schieb		2018	2022
Anke Konrad		2022	

== See also ==
- Germany–Serbia relations
- Foreign relations of Germany
