= Friedrich Albrecht von der Schulenburg =

Electoral Saxon and later Royal Saxon diplomat and minister

Saxon Envoy to Austria
- In office 1814–1839
- Preceded by: Karl Friedrich Ludwig von Watzdorf
- Succeeded by: Carl Emil von Üchtritz

Saxon Envoy to Russia
- In office 1801–1804

Saxon Envoy to Denmark
- In office 1799–1801

Personal details
- Born: 18 June 1772 Dresden, Electorate of Saxony
- Died: 12 September 1853 (aged 81) Klosterrode, Kingdom of Prussia
- Spouse: Armgard von der Schulenburg (m. 1822; died 1853)

Count Friedrich Albrecht von der Schulenburg (18 June 18 1772 – 12 September 1853) was an Electoral Saxon, then Royal Saxon, diplomat and minister.

== Early life ==
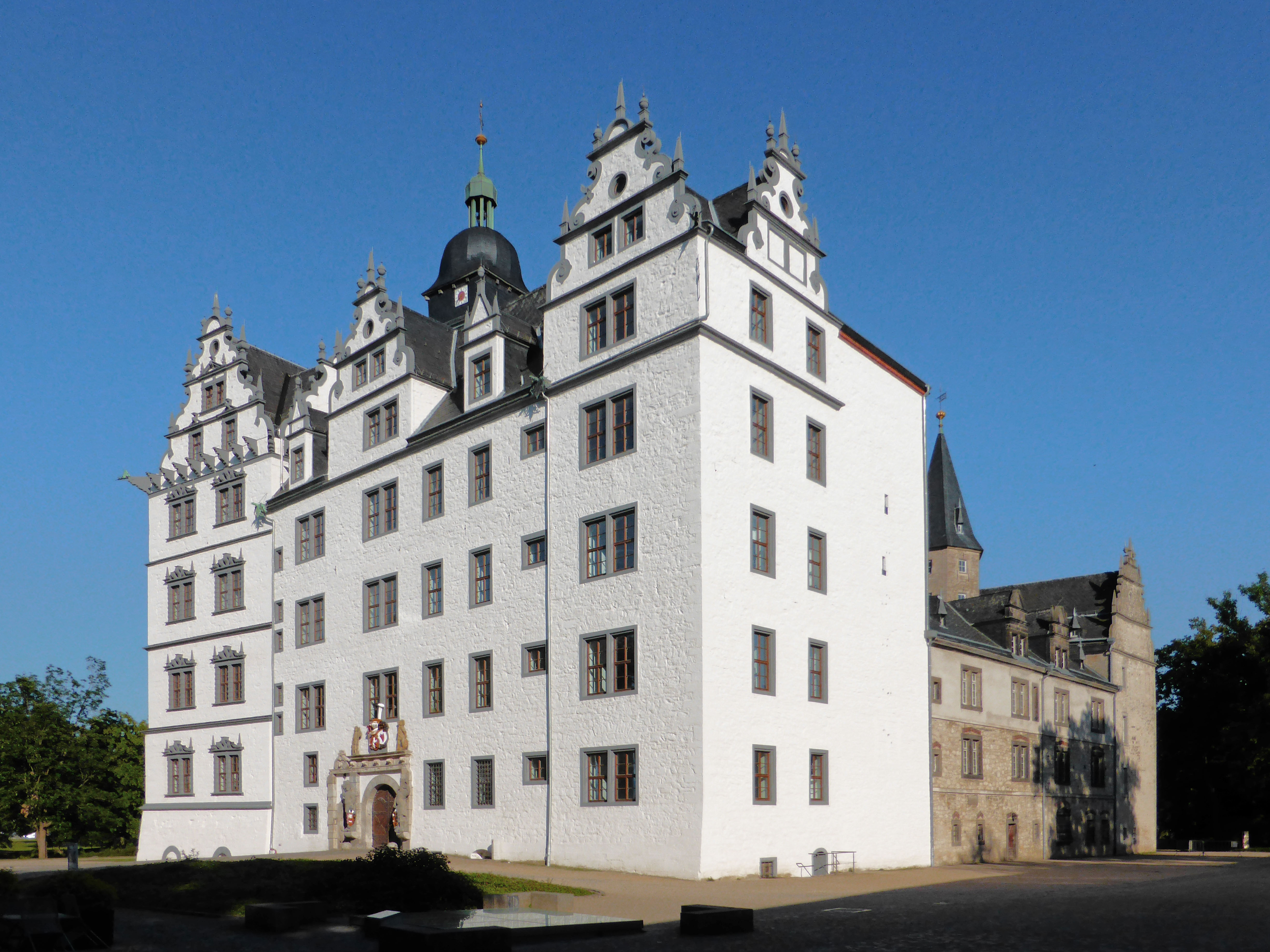
Wolfsburg Castle

Schulenburg was born on 18 June 18 1772 in Dresden in the Electorate of Saxony. He was the son of Albrecht Ludwig von der Schulenburg (1741–1784), Privy Chamber and Mountain Councilor, and Auguste Friederike von Stammer (1751–1809).

His father was the youngest son of Adolph Friedrich von der Schulenburg, a Prussian Lieutenant General and confidant of King Frederick William I who fell in the Battle of Mollwitz during the First Silesian War. His grandfather received the hereditary nobility title of Imperial Count in 1728 from Emperor Charles VI. His maternal grandmother, Anna Adelheit Catharina von Bartensleben, was the sole heir to the von Bartensleben estate and Wolfsburg Castle, upon the death of her father, Gebhard Werner von Bartensleben, in 1742. Among his large family were uncle Gebhard Werner von der Schulenburg (who married Sophie Charlotte von Veltheim) and aunts Christina Amalie (wife of Friedrich Wilhelm von Witzleben), Helena (wife of Emmerich Otto August von Estorff), and Johanna Adelheid (wife of Gotthelf Dietrich von Ende).

After his father's early death, he grew up in Klosterrode (today a part of Blankenheim), and was looked after by his mother and his guardian, Baron Heinrich Ulrich Erasmus von Hardenberg (the father of the poet Novalis). After studying in Leipzig and Wittenberg, he devoted himself to diplomacy and politics.

== Career ==
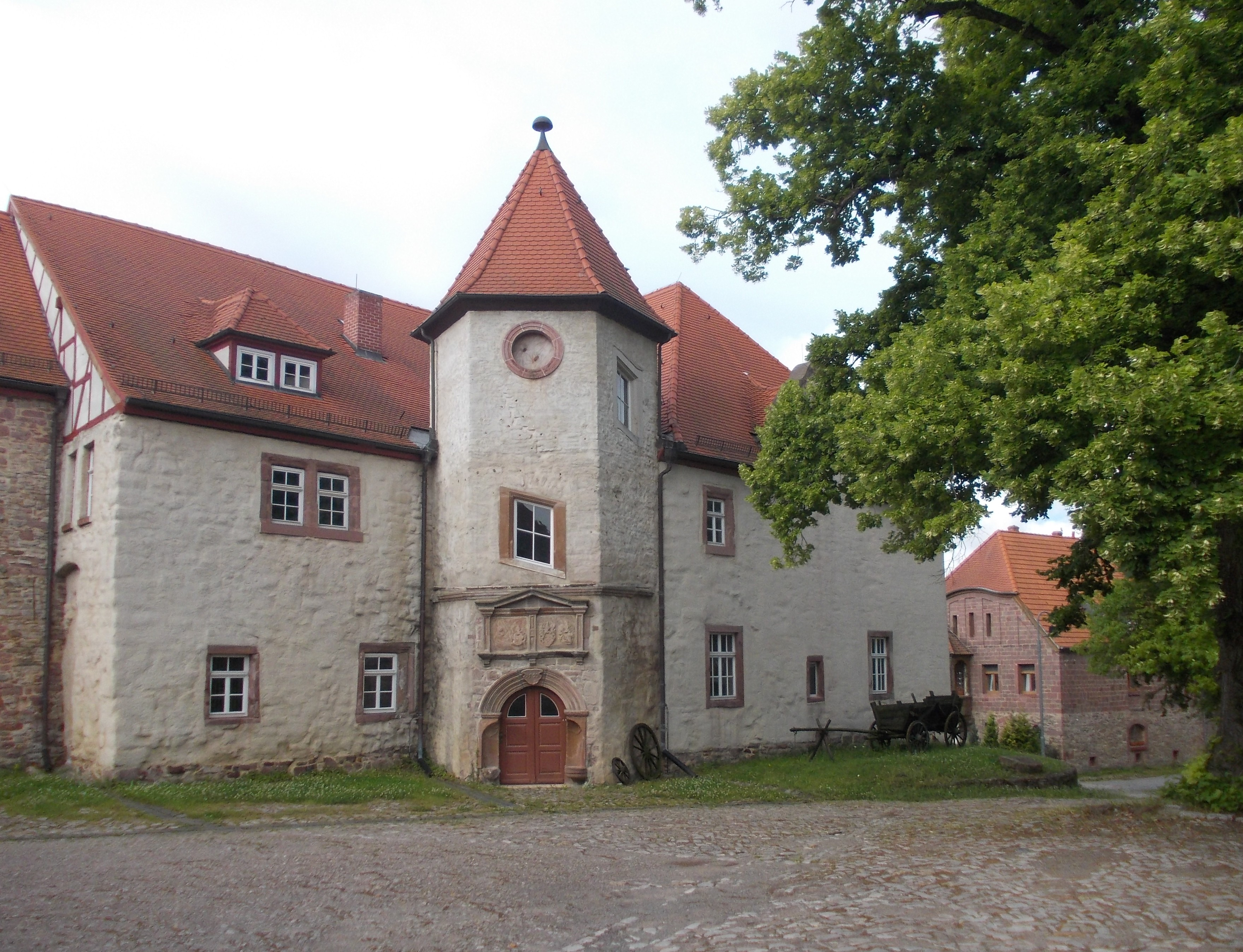
Old castle, Klosterrode

From 1794 to 1798, he was assigned as attaché to the embassies in Vienna, Regensburg and Rastatt. In 1799 he became Ambassador in Copenhagen, from 1801 to 1804 he held the same post in Saint Petersburg and from 1810 to 1830 at the court of Vienna.

At the Paris negotiations in 1815 he was accredited to the Emperors of Austria, Russia and the King of Prussia. His task as representative for Saxony at the Congress of Vienna, and its successor conferences, was made considerably more difficult because he was not accredited in an official capacity in the negotiations about the fate of Saxony after the Battle of Leipzig until the agreements at the Congress of Vienna were reached, but only participated as a private citizen could. On 18 May 1815, he signed the treaty concluded with the great powers, which was ratified by the King on 21 May. This sealed the division of Saxony and ceded the former Saxon Courlands to Prussia. Schulenburg's property, the Klosterrode estate (which his grandfather Adolf Friedrich had acquired in 1739), also came to Prussia.

In 1819, he took part in the Carlsbad Conferences as his King's plenipotentiary. In the same year, he was entrusted with courting the hand of Archduchess Marie Caroline of Austria for the then prince, later King Frederick Augustus II. In 1828 he was appointed Conference Minister and, in October 1830, after the small-state revolution in Saxony, he left the civil service, following his brother-in-law, Count Einsiedel, who had headed Saxony's foreign policy since May 1813 and on whose administration Schulenburg was said to have exerted considerable influence.

After his retirement, lived mainly in Vienna, where he had considerable influence in the local salons. However, he spent his summers on his estate in Klosterrode, where he died of a heart attack in 1853.

== Personal life ==
On 4 June 1822 he was married to Armgard von der Schulenburg (1799–1883), daughter of Philipp Ernst Alexander von der Schulenburg-Emden and Caroline von Alvensleben. There were no children of the marriage.

Count von der Schulenburg-Klosterroda died on 12 September 1853 in Klosterrode, the last descendant of the family from the Klosterrode line, and was buried in the family crypt at St. Lamberti in Blankenheim.
