= List of ambassadors of Germany to Brazil =

The list of German ambassadors in Brazil contains the highest-ranking representatives of the North German Confederation, the German Empire and the Federal Republic of Germany in Brazil.

== History ==
As early as 1867, the North German Confederation had sent a representative for diplomatic affairs to Brazil. This post was then taken over by accredited diplomats from the German Empire, the Weimar Republic and the Third Reich until the representation in Rio de Janeiro was converted into a full-fledged embassy in 1937. With the establishment of Brasília as the new capital, the German embassy also moved there in 1970.

== North German Confederation/German Empire ==
Name	Image	Term Start	Term End	Notes
Julius de Saint-Pierre		1867	1871	Minister-resident of the North German Confederation
Eberhard zu Solms-Sonnenwalde		1872	1873	Minister-resident of the German Empire
Xaver Uebel		1874	1877	Chargé d'affaires
Heinrich von Beust		1877	1879	
Rudolf Friedrich Le Maistre		1879	1886	
Otto Magnus von Dönhoff		1886	1892	
Heinrich Graf von Luxburg		1892	1894	Chargé d'affaires
Friedrich Richard Krauel		1894	1898	
Emmerich von Arco-Valley		1898	1900	
Karl Georg von Treutler		1901	1907	
Franz von Reichenau		1907	1908	
Emmerich von Arco-Valley		1909	1909	
Christian Gustav Michahelles		1910	1913	
Adolf Pauli		1913	1917	
Georg Alfred Plehn		1920	1925	
Hubert Knipping		1925	1932	
Arthur Schmidt-Elskop		1933	1937	Envoy
Karl Ritter		1937	1938	
Curt Max Prüfer		1939	1942	

== Federal Republic of Germany ==
Name	Image	Term Start	Term End	Notes
Fritz Oellers		1951	1956	
Carl Werner Dankwort		1956	1958	
Gebhardt von Walther		1958	1959	
Herbert Dittmann		1959	1962	
Gebhard Seelos		1962	1966	
Ehrenfried von Holleben		1966	1971	Last German ambassador in Rio
Karl Hermann Knoke		1971	1974	First ambassador in the new capital Brasília
Horst Röding		1974	1977	
Hansjörg Kastl		1977	1980	
Franz Jochen Schoeller		1980	1983	
Walter Gorenflos		1984	1987	
Heinz Dittmann		1987	1990	
Theodor Wallau		1991	1993	
Herbert Limmer		1993	1995	
Claus-Jürgen Duisberg		1995	1999	
Hans-Bodo Bertram		1999	2001	
Uwe Kaestner		2001	2004	
Friedrich Prot von Kunow		2004	2009	
Wilfried Grolig		2010	2014	
Dirk Brengelmann		2014	2016	
Georg Witschel		2016	2020	
Heiko Thoms		2020	2023	
Bettina Cadenbach		2023	Present	

== See also ==
- Brazil-Germany relations
