= List of ambassadors of Saxony to Austria =

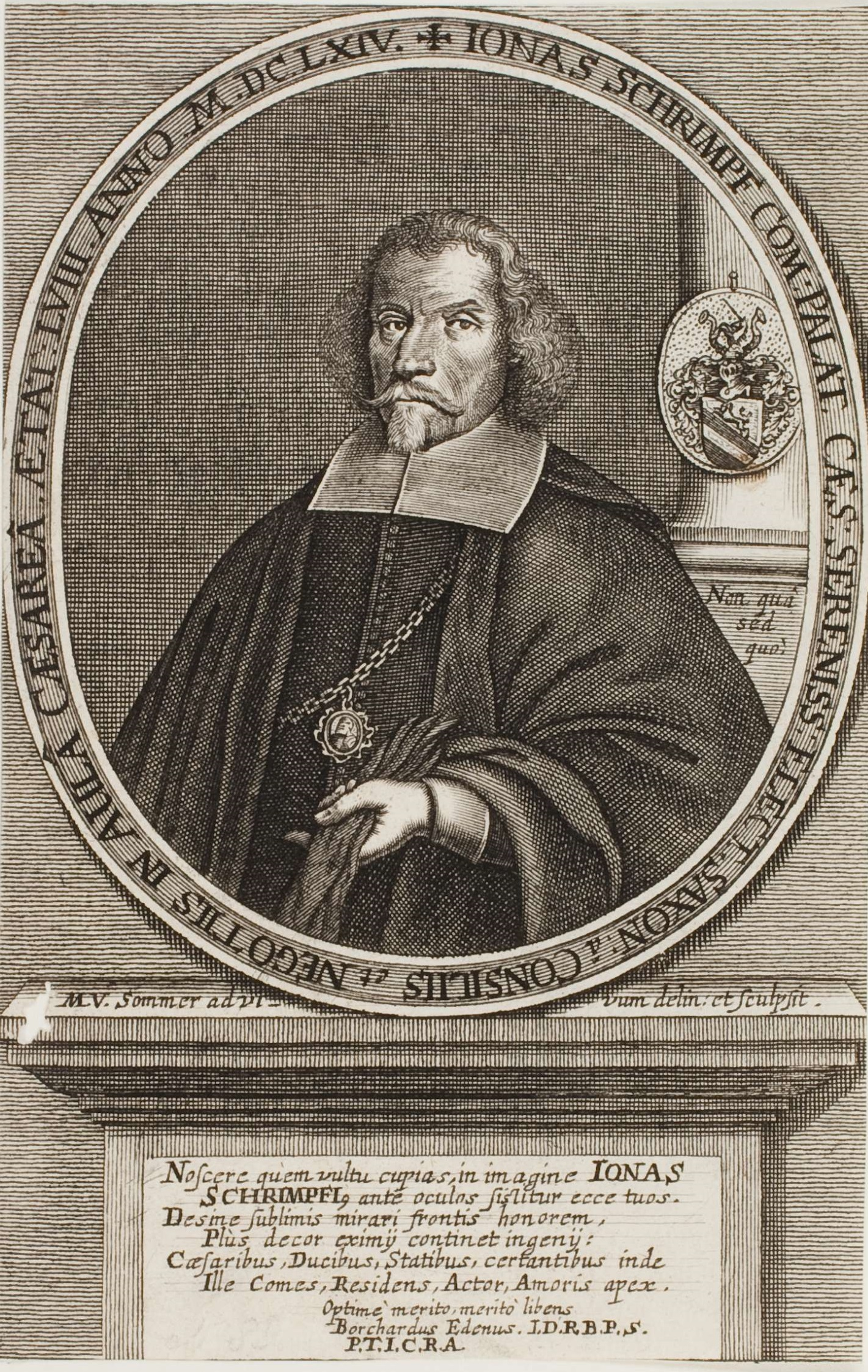
Jonas Schrimpf

The following is a partial list of envoys of Saxony to the Habsburg monarchy in Austria.

== Envoys of the Electorate of Saxony ==
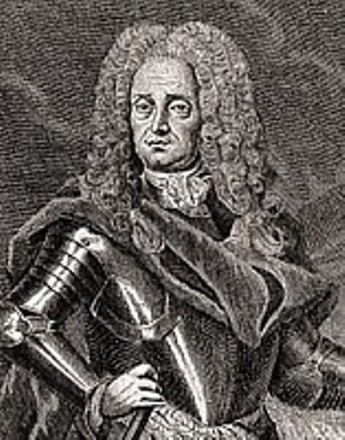
August Christoph von Wackerbarth

1649: Establishment of diplomatic relations.

- 1649–1696: Jonas Schrimpf (–1696)
- 1700–1706: August Christoph von Wackerbarth (1662–1734)
- 1706–1708: Wolff Heinrich Vesnich
- 1708–1718: August Christoph von Wackerbarth (1662–1734)

...

- 1722–1725: Johann Justus Terras (–1727)
- 1725–1727: François Joseph Wicardel de Fleury (–1735)
- 1728–1730: Joseph Anton Gabaleon von Wackerbarth-Salmour (1685–1761)

...

- 1733–1740: Ludwig Adolph von Zech (1683–1760)

...

- 1745–1749: Christian von Loß (1697–1770)
- 1750–1752: Johann Sigismund von Pezold (1704–1783)
- 1752–1763: Karl Georg Friedrich von Flemming (1705–1767)
- 1763–1783: Johann Sigismund von Pezold (1704–1783)

...

== Envoys of the Kingdom of Saxony ==
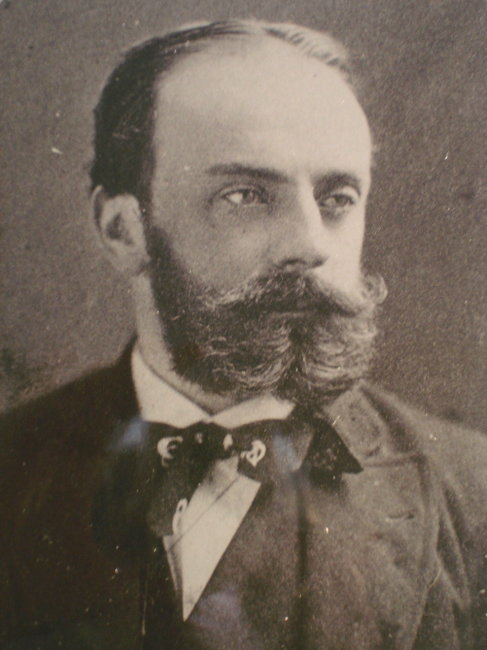
Rudolf Friedrich Le Maistre

...

- 1812–1813: Karl von Watzdorf (1759–1840)
- 1814–1839: Friedrich Albrecht von der Schulenburg (1772–1853)
- 1839–1841: Carl Emil von Üchtritz (1783–1841)
- 1842–1866: Rudolf von Könneritz (1800–1870)
- 1866–1869: Rudolf Friedrich Le Maistre (1835–1903)
- 1870–1876: Carl Gustav Adolf von Bose (1817–1893)
- 1876–1897: Oskar von Helldorf (1829–1899)
- 1898–1916: Rudolf Karl Caspar von Rex (1858–1916)
- 1916–1918: Alfred von Nostitz-Wallwitz (1870–1953)

== Envoy of the Free State of Saxony ==
- 1918–1920: Dr. Benndorf

1920: Dissolution of the embassy

== See also ==
- Kingdom of Saxony
- Unification of Germany
