= Schulenburg (surname) =

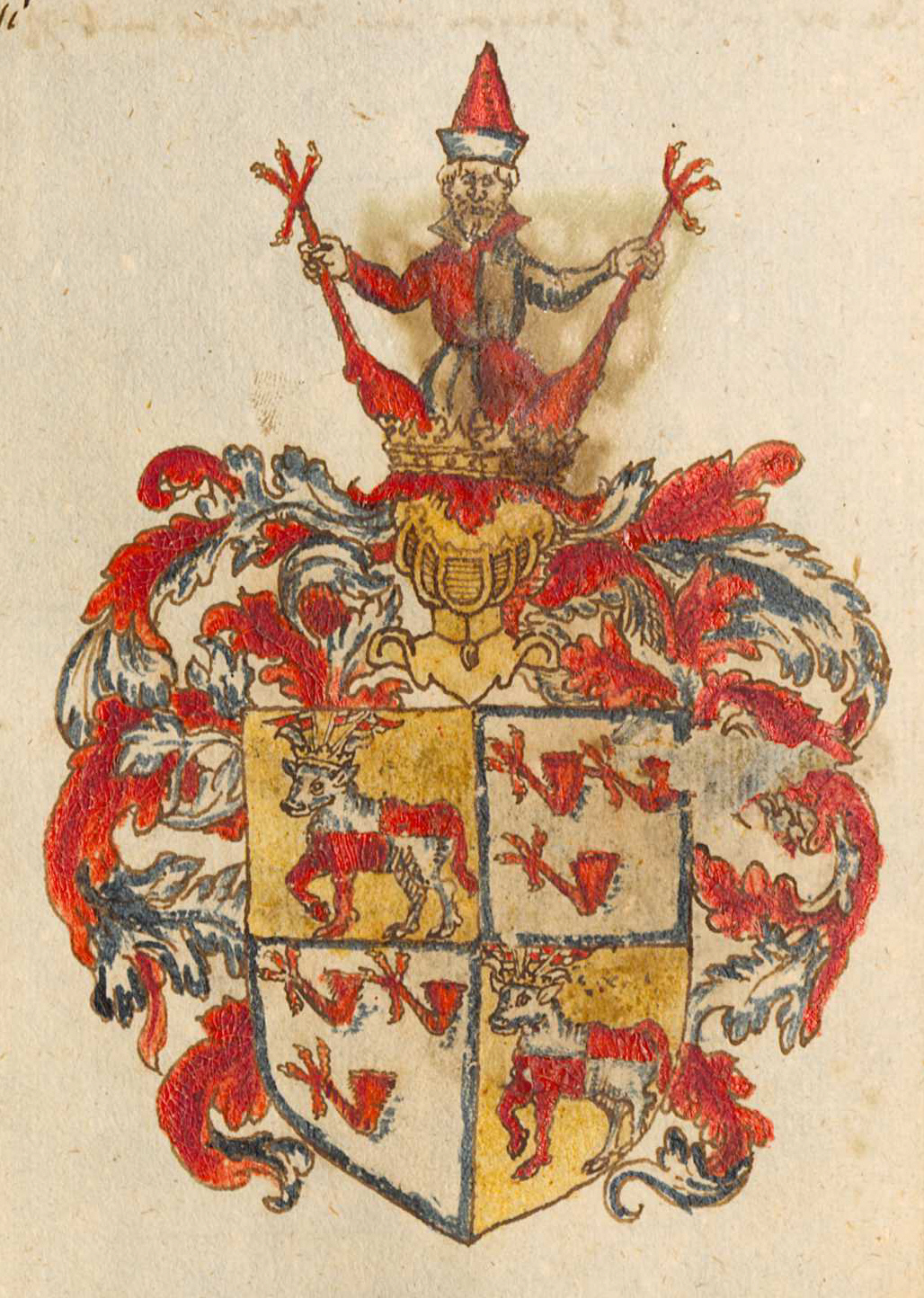
Arms of von der Schulenburg family

The House of Schulenburg is an ancient German noble family that can trance its noble lineage back to 1237, with the knight (ritter) Wernerus de Sculenburch, and originates from Saxony-Anhalt. Members of the family held the title of Imperial Count. They had multiple political and military roles in the history of Germany and Great Britain.

== Notable members ==
- Adolph Friedrich von der Schulenburg (1685–1741), Prussian lieutenant general during the First Silesian War
- Chris Schulenburg (born 1980), German politician
- Friedrich Graf von der Schulenburg (1865–1939), German generalmajor during World War I and SS-Obergruppenführer
- Fritz-Dietlof von der Schulenburg (1902–1944), German government official and anti-Hitler conspirator
- Friedrich Albrecht von der Schulenburg (1772–1853), Saxon diplomat
- Friedrich-Werner Graf von der Schulenburg (1875–1944), German diplomat and anti-Hitler conspirator
- Karl Werner de:Günther von der Schulenburg (1865–1939), German aristocrat, soldier and LGBT-activist
- Johann Matthias von der Schulenburg (1661–1747), German mercenary, aristocrat, and Rococo art collector
- Ludwig von Schulenburg-Oeynhausen (1699-1754), Imperial general and diplomat during the War of Austrian Succession
- Melusine von der Schulenburg, Duchess of Kendal (1667–1743), mistress of King George I of Great Britain
- Melusina von der Schulenburg, Countess of Walsingham (1693–1778), natural daughter of Melusine von der Schulenburg and George I of Great Britain
- Michael von der Schulenburg (born 1948), German diplomat and politician, Member of the European Parliament (since 2024)
- Wilibald von Schulenburg (1847–1934), German landscape artist
- Wolfardine von Minutoli (born Wolfardine von der Schulenburg) (1794–1864), German Egyptologist and writer

== See also ==
- Schulenburg, Texas
