= Rupprecht von Keller =

German lawyer and diplomat

- Born: 19 March 1910; Schöneberg, German Empire
- Died: 19 July 2003 (aged 93); Tutzing, Germany
- Occupations: Lawyer; Diplomat
- Organization: Foreign Office
- Parent: Friedrich von Keller

Rupprecht von Keller (19 March 1910 – 19 July 2003) was a German lawyer and diplomat.

== Life ==
Von Keller was born in Schöneberg. His parents were Friedrich von Keller and Irene von Landmann, a daughter of Robert von Landmann. He graduated from the gymnasium at Ettal Abbey. He studied law in Lausanne and Munich, passing his first Staatsexamen. He wrote his dissertation Der Geisel im modernen Völkerrecht (The hostage in modern international law) in 1932 at the University of Erlangen. In 1933, in order to secure a position as a referendary, he joined the "Marine SA" in Bavaria, but left in 1935.

Beginning in 1936, he worked for the Foreign Office (Auswärtiges Amt) in Berlin. From 1937 to 1938, he was an attaché representing Germany in Helsingfors. He became a member of the Nazi Party in 1940 and volunteered for the Kriegsmarine to avoid being questioned about his Jewish ancestors. He served from 1940 to 1944, ending as adjutant of the Oberbefehlshaber of the "Marine Nord" (Navy North) in Norway. In 1944, he became liaison officer to the Oberkommando der Wehrmacht in Berlin and Garmisch-Partenkirchen.

In 1947, he practiced law in the Nürnberg High Command Trial, defending General Rudolf Lehmann. He was associate defense counsel to Georg von Schnitzler in the IG Farben Trial. In 1949, he was married to Christa von Behr. The couple had two children, Eugen (born 1951) and Cordula (born 1958).

In 1950, he was called by Wilhelm Haas (ambassador) to organise a new Auswärtiges Amt. In 1952, he was sent to Ankara as Diplomatic (Counsellor) and to Spain, from 1954 to 1956. In 1957, he began working in Bonn on trade agreements with Malaysia, Iran, Pakistan and several African countries.

From 1964 to 1969, he was an observer with the rank of ambassador at the United Nations office in Geneva; from 1966, he was also consul for Geneva, Valais and Vaud. In 1969, he became deputy director of the legal division of the Foreign Office. In August 1972, he was appointed ambassador to Canada. He retired in 1975. The family then lived in Tutzing, where he died.

== Awards ==
In 1965, von Keller was awarded the Großes Verdienstkreuz mit Stern (Knight Commander).

== Literature ==
- Maria Keipert (ed.): Biographisches Handbuch des deutschen Auswärtigen Dienstes 1871–1945. Auswärtiges Amt, Historischer Dienst. Vol. 2: Gerhard Keiper, Martin Kröger: G–K. Schöningh, Paderborn. 2005, ISBN 3-506-71841-X.
