= Karl Friedrich Ludwig von Watzdorf =

Saxon general and diplomat

Saxon Envoy to Austria
- In office 1812–1813
- Succeeded by: Friedrich Albrecht von der Schulenburg

Personal details
- Born: 1 September 1759 Plauen, Electorate of Saxony
- Died: 16 May 1840 (aged 80) Dresden, Kingdom of Saxony
- Spouse(s): Antonie Maria von Stöcken (died 1800) Charlotte Henriette von Hopfgarten-Mülverstedt (m. 1804; died 1840)
- Parent(s): Adam Friedrich von Watzdorf; Henriette Philippine Charlotte von Pöllnitz

Karl Friedrich Ludwig von Watzdorf (1 September 1759 – 16 May 1840) was a Saxon general and diplomat.

== Early life ==
He was born on 1 September 1759 in Plauen, Electorate of Saxony into a Thuringian noble family. Raised on his parents' property in Kauschwitz (near Plauen), he was a son of the senior court judge Adam Friedrich von Watzdorf (1718–1781) and Henriette Philippine Charlotte von Pöllnitz (1733–1784).

After the death of his parents, he was awarded the manors of Kauschwitz and Syrau (today part of Rosenbach) through an inheritance contract with his brothers.

== Career ==
Watzdorf fought in the French Revolutionary Wars from 1793 to 1796. When in 1806 Saxony supported Napoleon, he took part in battles on the French side.

Watzdorf was an envoy in 1812 and 1813 in Vienna, where he signed a treaty of alliance with Austria on behalf of Saxony, which no longer supported the French. He acted as an intermediary from 1813 to 1815 between Dresden and Berlin, where he was imprisoned by Saxon king Frederick Augustus I of Saxony. Unsuccessfully sought his release, then sent the same request to the rulers of Prussia, Russia, and Austria, also to no avail. He later toured London, Frankfurt, and Paris, arguing that Saxony was not an enemy of the victorious countries, and entered into an alliance with Napoleon of necessity. He gave a great contribution to restoring Saxon relations with coalition countries.

Later he was entrusted with the education of successors to the Saxon throne.

He served as envoy from 1827 to 1834 in Berlin, where in 1834 signed a customs contract with Prussia, upon which was built after the German Customs Union (Zollverein). In 1835, Watzdorf was appointed Minister of the Royal House. He died in Dresden.

== Personal life ==
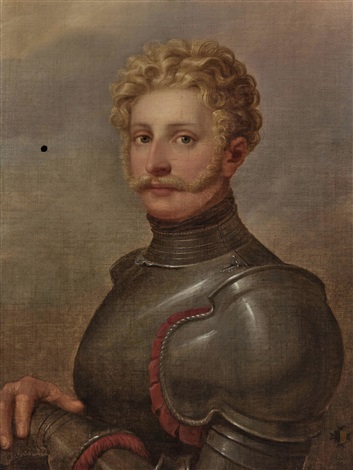
Portrait of his eldest son, Anton Jakob Carl, 1815

Watzdorf married Baroness Antonie Maria von Stöcken (1765–1800). Before her death in 1800, they were the parents of:

- Marie Frederike Auguste (1787–1842), who married Karl Borromäus von Miltitz, in 1810.
- Anton Jakob Carl (1788–1815), Prussian Lt.-Col. who fell at the Battle of Waterloo; he married Countess Wolfradine Auguste Luise von der Schulenburg.
- Max Gustav (1789–1814), a chamberlain; he married Sophie Auguste Mederacke.
- Josephine Margarethe (1790–1790), who died young.
- Luise Auguste Sophie (1792–1792), who died young.
- Marie Viktoria (1793–1794), who died young.

After the death of his first wife, he married Charlotte Henriette von Hopfgarten-Mülverstedt (1774–1864) on 7 May 1804. They were the parents of:

- Marie Klementine (1805–1826), who died unmarried.
- Karl Hermann (1807–1846), made baron in 1837; he married Wilhelmine (née von Reichenbach) Luckner, in 1840.
- Therese Adelaide (1808–1841), who married Karl Wolfgang von Heygendorff, the illegitimate son of Karl August, Grand Duke of Saxe-Weimar-Eisenach and the actor Karoline Jagemann, in 1836.

Watzdorf died in Dresden on 16 May 1840.
