= Franz Jochen Schoeller =

German diplomat (1926–2019)

Franz Jochen Philipp Schoeller (24 July 1926 – 13 May 2019) was a German diplomat and ambassador.

== Early life ==
Schoeller was born on 24 July 1926 in Düsseldorf into the prominent Schoeller family.

He studied law and economics at the University of Cologne and University of Paris.

== Career ==
After completing his exams, he was promoted to the Federal Foreign Office in 1955. Schoeller began his career with foreign assignments at the embassies in France, Italy, Tanzania, Spain and in Iran, where he served as permanent representative of the German ambassador in Tehran. In 1973, he was appointed to the protocol staff of the Foreign Office and, in 1975, was promoted to Head of Protocol at the German Foreign Office, which holds ambassadorial rank. In this capacity, he greeted U.S. President Gerald Ford, and his wife, First Lady Betty Ford, in July 1975 at the Cologne Bonn Airport.

Afterwards, he was appointed as Ambassador of the Federal Republic of Germany to the German embassies in Brasília, Paris and Warsaw. As Ambassador in Warsaw, Schoeller granted asylum to German citizens wishing to leave the country on the embassy grounds in the second half of 1989. In November 1989, Schoeller retired, at his own request, for health reasons.

Schoeller served as honorary president of the board of EuroDefense, an organization that strives for a common European security and defense policy. He also was a member of the German Society of Members of the French Legion of Honor and the French National Order of Merit.

== Personal life ==
Schoeller, who was married to Ingetraud Neul (1932–2021), died in Bad Godesberg on 13 May 2019.

=== Honors ===
- 1979: Cross of Merit 1st Class of the Federal Republic of Germany
- 1980: Grand Cross of Merit of the Federal Republic of Germany

Diplomatic posts
Preceded by Max von Podewils-Dürnitz	Head of Protocol at the German Foreign Office; 1975–1980	Succeeded by Hans-Werner Finck von Finckenstein
Preceded by Jörg Kastl	Ambassador of the Federal Republic of Germany to Brazil; 1980–1983	Succeeded by Walter Gorenflos
Preceded by Axel Herbst	Ambassador of the Federal Republic of Germany to France; 1983–1987	Succeeded by Franz Pfeffer
Preceded by Franz Pfeffer	Ambassador of the Federal Republic of Germany to Poland; 1987–1989	Succeeded by Günter Knackstedt
