= Hermann Speck von Sternburg =

German diplomat (1852–1908)

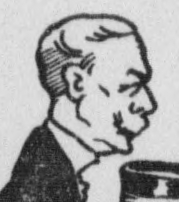
1904 Sketch of von Sternburg, by Bob Satterfield

Hermann Speck von Sternburg (21 August 1852 Leeds, England – 23 August 1908 Heidelberg, Germany) was a German diplomat.

== Education ==
Sternburg was educated in the Fürstenschule Saint Afra, Meissen, Saxony, and the military academy of Potsdam.

== Career ==
Sternburg was the grandson of the merchant and art collector Maximilian Speck von Sternburg who was knighted with a hereditary title. Sternburg served in the military and fought through the Franco-Prussian War in the Second Saxon dragoons, and he remained in the military until 1885.

In 1890, Sternburg began his diplomatic career and was secretary of legation at Beijing, chargé d'affaires at Belgrade, and first secretary of the embassy at Washington, DC. In 1898, he was high commissioner on the Samoan Commission. He became consul general for British India and Ceylon in 1900, minister plenipotentiary and envoy extraordinary to the United States in 1903, and ambassador in July 1903, succeeding Theodor von Holleben.

After the bombardment of San Carlos island, Venezuela, by the Kriegsmarine on January 31, 1903, US President Theodore Roosevelt castigated Sternburg for Germany's actions. Sternburg reported to Berlin that Germany had sacrificed the little sympathy that it had in the United States.

== Personal life ==
In December 1900, Sternburg married Lillian Langham, an American citizen.

Sternburg died of complications from lupus, Heidelberg, on August 23, 1908.

His connoisseurship as an art collector became evident upon an auction of his collection after his death. The illustrated catalogue of The Important Collection of Art Treasures, formed by his Excellency the late Baron Speck von Sternberg, German Ambassador to the United States demonstrates that as a cultured aristocrat and German ambassador in many countries, he collected works of art all from over the world. The list of buyers of his collection is most impressive, and some of his collections survive in museums.

== See also ==
- German Ambassador to the United States
