= Wolfardine von Minutoli =

German writer and Egyptologist (1794–1864)

Wolfradine von Minutoli
- Born: Wolfradine August Luise von der Schuldenburg; 1 February 1794; Dessau, Germany
- Died: 22 November 1867 (aged 73); Berlin, Germany
- Known for: Producing a travelogue of her Egyptian tour

Baroness Wolfradine Auguste Luise von Minutoli (1 February 1794 – 22 November 1864) was a German writer and Egyptologist.

== Early life ==
Countess Wolfradine August Luise von der Schulenburg was born in Dessau, as the youngest child and only daughter Count Adolph Friedrich Werner von der Schulenburg (1759–1825) and his wife, Wolfradine von Kampen (1773–1794).

== Biography ==
In September 1820 Wolfradine arrived, along with her husband Heinrich Menu von Minutoli, member of the Minutoli family, and other scholars, in Alexandria as part of a research expedition to Egypt. Wolfradine published an account of her travels, first in French in 1826 as Mes souvenirs d’Egypte and subsequently in English (1827) and German (1829).This is one of very few travel accounts written by German women at this time. In it she demonstrates her classical education by quoting Strabo, Pliny the Elder, and Pausanias throughout it.

Wolfradine and Heinrich had three sons, Julius, Adolph and Alexander.

== Select publications ==
- von Minutoli, W. 1827. Recollections of Egypt . Philadelphia.
