= Ernst von Treskow =

German diplomat

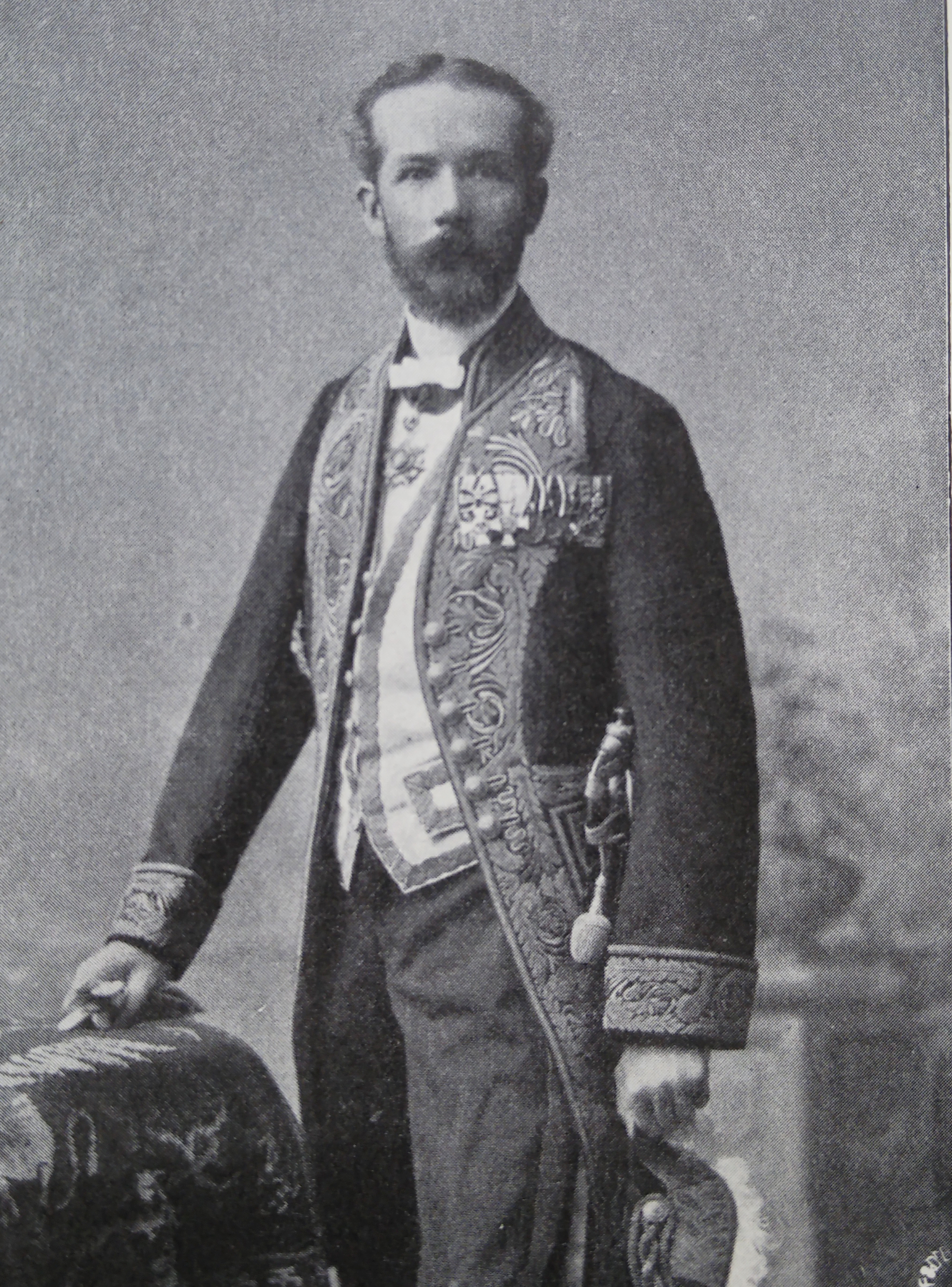

German Envoy to Argentina
- In office 1899–1901
- Preceded by: Friedrich von Mentzingen
- Succeeded by: Hans von Wangenheim

German Envoy to Chile
- In office 1891–1899
- Preceded by: Felix von Gutschmid
- Succeeded by: Oscar Stübel

Personal details
- Born: Ernst Heinrich von Treskow; 30 May 1844 Raden, Province of Posen, Prussia
- Died: 4 May 1915 (aged 70) Berlin-Wilmersdorf
- Relations: von Treskow family
- Parent(s): Heinrich von Treskow; Antonie von Bünting
- Education: Silesian Friedrich Wilhelm University; Ruprecht-Karls University

Ernst Heinrich von Treskow (30 May 1844 – 4 May 1915) was a German diplomat who served as envoy to Chile and Argentina.

== Early life ==
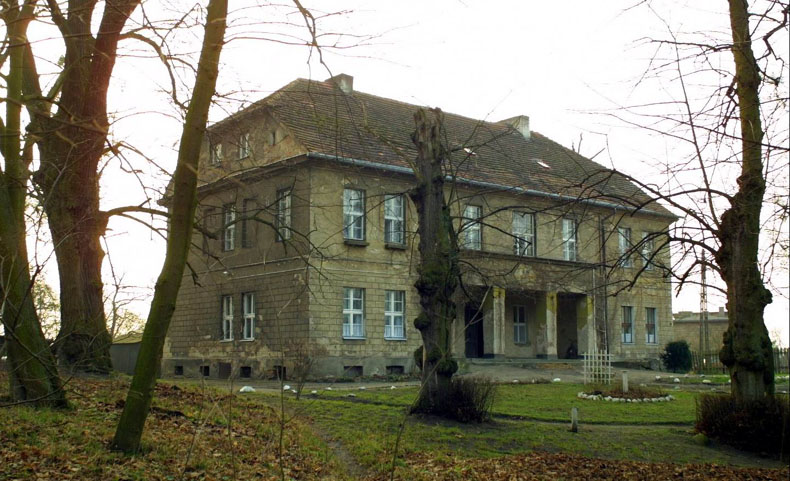
Radojewo Palace near Poznań

Ernst Von Treskow was born on 30 May 1844 at Raden Palace near Posen (today Radojewo, district of Poznań) into the noble von Treskow family. He was a son of Heinrich von Treskow (1795–1861) and Antonie von Bünting (1811–1860). Among his siblings were Maximilian von Treskow, Otto von Treskow, Richard von Treskow, Oskar, Prussian Generals Franz von Treskow, Eduard von Treskow and Heinrich von Treskow, among others. The palace he was born at was built for Sigmund Otto Joseph von Treskow.

Treskow studied law at the Silesian Friedrich Wilhelm University and at the Ruprecht-Karls University. In Breslau and Heidelberg he was a member of the Corps Borussia in 1862 and Corps Vandalia in 1863.

== Career ==
As a Second lieutenant in the 2nd Guards Foot Regiment of the Prussian Army, Treskow took part in the Austro-Prussian War of 1866 and the Franco-Prussian War of 1870 to 1871 before joined the Foreign Office in 1874. From 1876 he worked at the Consulate General in London. From 1879 he was Consul in Cairo. As such, he received Prince Friedrich Karl of Prussia on his trip to the Orient in 1883. During the Urabi revolt in 1882, he brought German and Austrian citizens to safety via Ismailia and Port Said. He then served as Consul General in Cape Town from 1888. Here he took over the official duties from the late Ernst Bieber (1845–1888) and then moved to Budapest and Istanbul in the same position until 1891.

=== Ambassador to Chile ===
Between 1891 and 1899 he served as German ambassador in Santiago de Chile. Even before he took office, his predecessor Felix von Gutschmid had expressly forbidden the German military advisors present in the country from intervening in the civil war between supporters of Parliament, the Congresistas, and supporters of President José Manuel Balmaceda. However, the leading military advisor Emil Körner did not adhere to this instruction. Rather, he defected to the insurgents under Jorge Montt Álvarez and coordinated the operations of the congressional troops as their chief of staff. Körner's intervention contributed significantly to the success of the Congresistas and helped them take power. In view of the new situation, Gutschmid advised his superiors in the Foreign Office and Emperor Wilhelm II not to prosecute Körner for his disloyalty to the legitimate Chilean government (Treskow even recommended that Körner be awarded the Order of the Red Eagle). He traveled to the German Empire in 1894 for decoration (but only received the Order of the Crown instead of the Order of the Eagle) and traveled back to Chile in October 1895 with 31 other military advisors from the Empire.

Later, the understanding between the ambassador and the military advisors was much more tense. In his reports to the Reich Chancellor Chlodwig zu Hohenlohe-Schillingsfürst in 1896 and 1897, von Treskow repeatedly complained about the high-handed behavior of the advisors. He described them as "modern soldiers of fortune" and accused them of taking part in internal Chilean conflicts and even selling weapons from Krupp and Mauser.

=== Ambassador to Argentina ===
From 1899 to 1900, Treskow was German ambassador to Buenos Aires. At this time, the Beagle conflict was brewing between the governments of Argentina and Chile due to aggressive Argentine propaganda. During Treskow's term of office, Argentine-German military cooperation reached a climax with the opening of the Escuela Superior de Guerra in Buenos Aires on March 7, 1900, by President Julio Argentino Roca.

== Personal life ==
Treskow died, unmarried, on 4 May 1915 in Berlin-Wilmersdorf.
