= Embassy of Germany, Athens =

German Embassy, Athens
- Location: Athens, Greece
- Address: Ypsilantou 10 & Karaoli Dimitriou,106 75 Kolonaki, Athens, Greece
- Coordinates: 37.9760859°N 23.7437823°E
- Ambassador: Ernst Reichel
- Website: German Embassy, Athens

The Embassy of Germany in Athens is the chief diplomatic mission of Germany in Greece. It is located in Kolonaki, one of the most prestigious neighbourhoods in central Athens. As of 2023 the German Ambassador to Greece was Dr. Ernst Reichel.

Germany maintains a Consulate-General in Thessaloniki and several honorary consuls across Greece.

== History ==
The Prussian legation was located at Akadimias Str. 23, today the headquarters of the Association of Foreign Press. After the establishment of the German Empire in 1871, it was converted into the German Embassy. After this building was sold, the embassy was located at Vasilissis Sofias Avenue 2 during the 1930s and the German occupation had lost the ability to act in foreign policy.

There was a new beginning in 1951, when post-war Germany initially resumed diplomatic relations with 12 countries, including Greece. Chancellor Konrad Adenauer first officially visited Greece in March 1954. After the new start, the embassy was initially temporarily housed in the Hotel Grande Bretagne, then moved to a building at Issiodou Street 22 in 1953.

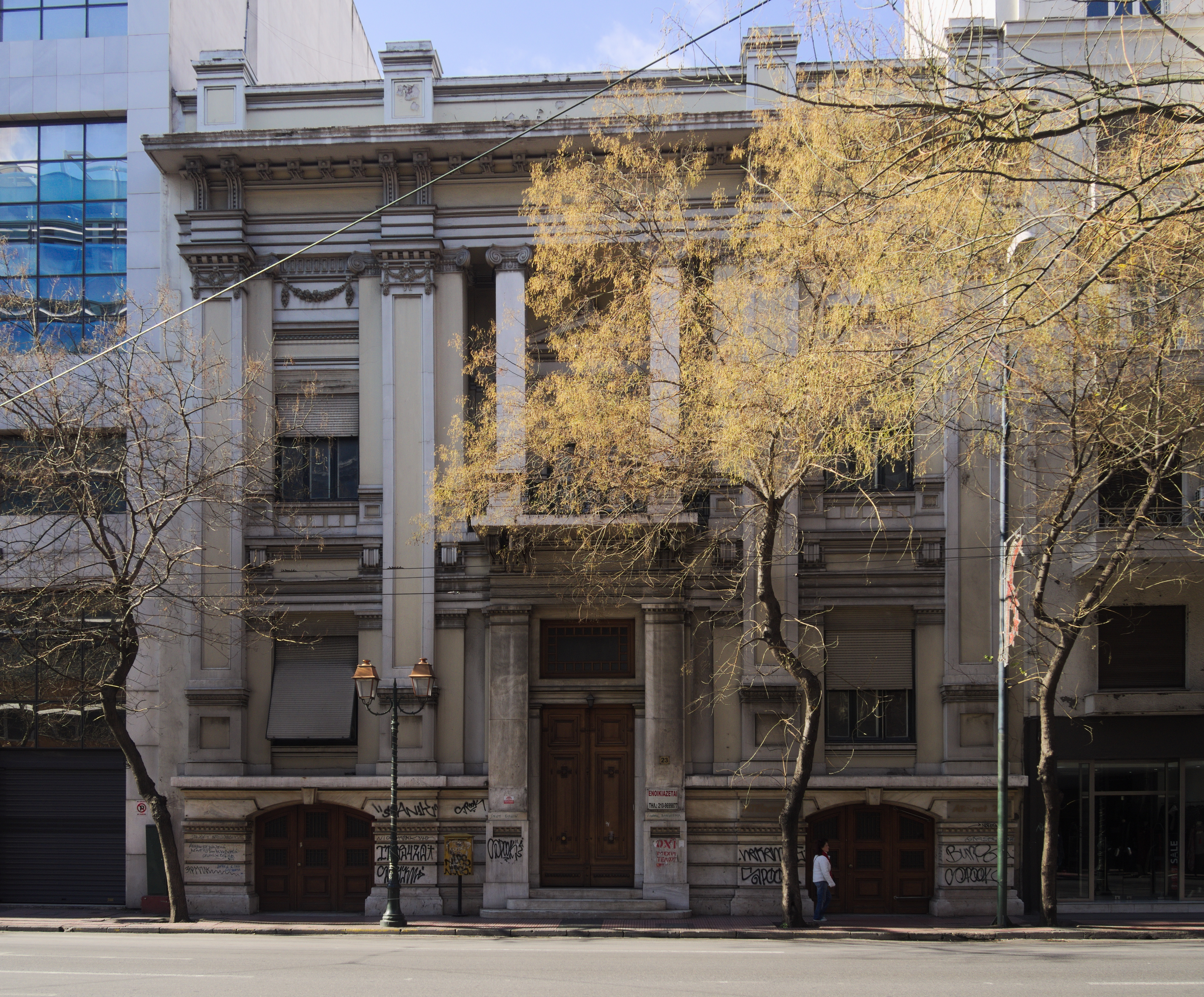
The building of the Prussian legation at Akadimias 23

In 1969, both the current building and the annex at 14 Ypsilantou Street were acquired as property. The increasing space requirement and the damage caused by the great earthquake of 1981 led to the decision to rebuild the building. The embassy office had to be relocated to Maroussi (Vasilissis Sofias Str. 10) during construction. The embassy moved into the rebuilt building in October 1993.

The current Embassy building is significant in its architecture for the incorporation of the Chronos Sculpture [German: Chronoskulptur], created by Karl Schlamminger, on its facade.

== Ambassador's residence ==
The official residence of the German Ambassador was formerly at Ethnikis Antistaseos Str. 52, in Chalandri. However, as it was occasionally targeted by protests, and following a terrorist attack in 2013, the residence was moved to a more secure location, in Filothei.

== See also ==
- Germany-Greece relations
- List of diplomatic missions in Greece
- List of diplomatic missions of Germany
