= Julius von Minutoli =

Prussian chief of police, diplomat, scientist, author and draughtsman

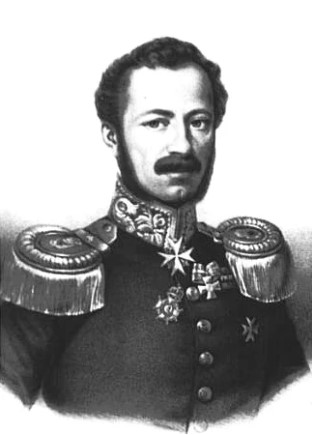
Julius Minutoli

Julius Rudolph Ottomar Freiherr von Minutoli (30 August 1804, in Berlin – 5 November 1860, in Khaneh Zanian Caravanserai, near Shiraz, Persia) was a Prussian chief of police, diplomat, scientist, and author, as well as a gifted draughtsman.

== Life ==
Born into the noble Minutoli family, he was the second son of the military officer and Egyptologist Heinrich Menu von Minutoli, then one of the teachers of the Berlin cadet corps. His father was in 1810 appointed the educator of the Prince Carl, and in 1820 was given the title of Baron von Minutoli. His mother, Wolfardine von Schulenburg was also an Egyptologist. Because the family has lived since 1810 in the royal palace of Unter den Linden, Julius von Minutoli had personal contact early in life with Carl and with the crown prince, later Friedrich Wilhelm IV.

Julius studied jurisprudence and cameralism in Berlin and Heidelberg and in 1828 or 1830 entered the Prussian civil service, first of all as a Kammergerichtsassessor in Koblenz, from where he produced his book "Über das römische Recht auf dem linken Rheinufer" (About Roman Law on the left bank of the Rhine; Berlin, 1831). He was transferred in 1832 to the post of government advisor (German: Regierungsrat) in Posen and was there appointed in 1839 to the chief of police and mayor. In these posts he became well-known at court for revealing several attempted Polish uprisings and among his Polish and German subjects for his tolerance and appreciation of social and cultural activities. He was promoted in 1842 to Junior Doctor of Law and was entrusted occasionally with tasks in the Prussian Ministry of the Interior, though he was soon sent back to Poznań. As a result of an official trip through Europe and North Africa, he published in 1843 a work called "Die neuen Straf- und Besserungssysteme" on the new punishment and rehabilitation systems that he had seen in Algeria, Spain, Portugal, England, France and Holland.

He was appointed chief of police of Berlin in 1847 by Friedrich Wilhelm IV, and in 1848 promoted to Regierungsrat, First class. During the events of March 1848, he was able at first to be a moderating influence on the rebels, but was ultimately unable to prevent the outbreak of the violence. Through his moderate stance, he displeased the reactionary powers then on the rise. On 27 June 1848, he resigned his post as a chief of police and was released from the civil service.

Minutoli had married Freiin Mathilde von Rotenhan (1812–1878) in 1834, and they had had four children. After his resignation, he and his family moved to Franken, probably living in his wife's house in Rentweinsdorf and perhaps occasionally also in Bamberg. During this time, he studied the history of Hohenzollern and Brandenburg, as well as producing his memoirs, that were forbidden in Prussia.

After being without a position ever since his resignation, in 1851 he entered the diplomatic service and became Prussian consul general for Spain and Portugal. Making several businesses trips to Barcelona, Spain, Portugal and the Canary Islands subsequently featured in his writings. He returned to Berlin in 1859 and was dispatched again the following year as a Prussian Minister-resident and consul general to Persia. He died on 5 November 1860 during a business trip to the Persian Gulf in a Caravanserei in Shiraz, probably of cholera, and was buried in the cemetery of the Armenian Christian community there.

== Cultural activities ==
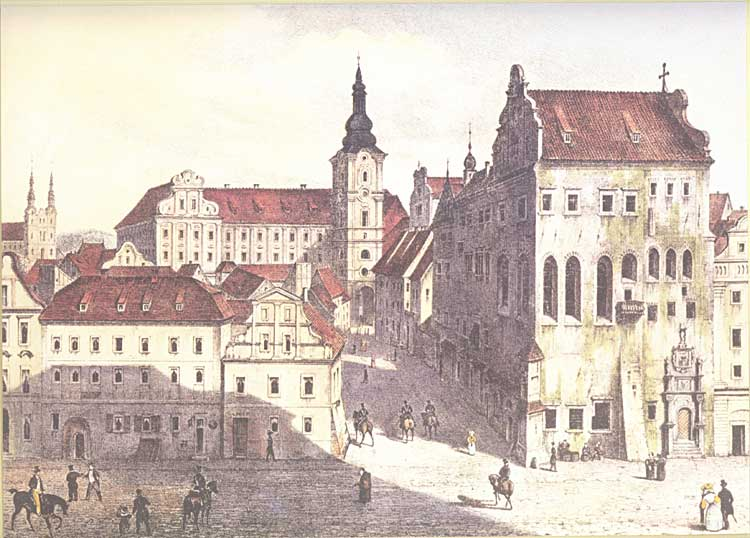
Coloured lithograph by Julius of the Poznań. On right large building - Palace of Górka family, in middle with tower, former Jesuit college (in this time Stadtschloss of Antoni Henryk Radziwiłł), on left in background, church of minorites

Already during his time at Posen, just as on his later trips, Julius made numerous sketches of persons, building and events, some of which he sold and some of which he gave to Friedrich Wilhelm IV gave, and with which he made his name even now until today a name as a draughtsman.

During his time in Franken he maintained close contacts with the leading Bamberg circles in science and culture, especially history and natural science, establishing its Naturalienkabinett (now the Naturkundemuseum) and contributing numerous exhibits to other museums. He maintained extensive correspondence, among others, with the "Prussian Court-Modeller" in Bamberg Carl Schropp, the collector Emil Freiherr Marschalk von Ostheim and the archivist Paul Oesterreicher.

A lavender-type growing on the Canary Islands was named "Lavandula minutolii" in May 1860 by the botanist Carl Bolle in Julius's honour.

== Works ==
- Über das römische Recht auf dem linken Rheinufer (Berlin 1831)
- Mitarbeit am "Berliner Kalender für das Gemein-Jahr 1839", mehrere Kupfer und Erläuterungen der Kupfer, Berlin 1839.
- "Statistik des Kreises Posen", 1840.
- Die neuen Straf- und Besserungssysteme. Erinnerungen von einer Reise durch bemerkenswerte Gefängnisse in Algier, Spanien, Portugal, England, Frankreich und Holland (Berlin 1843)
- Die Mark Brandenburg, Berlin und Köln im Jahr 1451 (Berlin 1850, 3. Aufl. 1853)
- Die weiße Frau (Berlin 1850)
- Friedrich I. Kurfürst von Brandenburg und Memorabilia aus den Quellen des Plassenburger Archivs (Berlin 1850)
- Das kaiserliche Buch des Markgrafen Achilles - Kurfürstliche Periode von 1470-1486 (Berlin 1850)
- "Erinnerungen aus meinem Leben, III. Teil, Vergebliche Versuche zur verheißenen Wiederanstellung", Bamberg 1850.
- Die Kanarischen Inseln, ihre Vergangenheit und Zukunft (Berlin 1854)
- Spanien und seine fortschreitende Entwickelung (Berlin 1852)
- Altes und Neues aus Spanien (Berlin 1854, 2 Bde.)
- Portugal und seine Kolonien 1854 (Stuttgart 1855)

== Bibliography ==
- Dorothea Minkels (2003-10-31). 1848 gezeichnet. BoD – Books on Demand. ISBN 978-3-8334-0096-4.
- Dorothea Minkels (2004-12-31). In der Keimzeit der Demokratie Berliner Polizeipräsident. DeMi Verlag. ISBN 978-3-8334-1568-5.

== Exhibitions ==
- "In der Keimzeit der Demokratie Berliner Polizeipräsident - Julius von Minutoli zum 200. Geburtstag." Zentrum für Berlin-Studien, Breite Straße 36 Berlin. (30. August 2004 bis 29. Januar 2005)
- "Julius von Minutoli (1804-1860) rysownik - policjant - dyplomata". Biblioteka Raczynskich - Muzeum Literackie H. Sienkiewicza, Poznan (Posen/Polen), Stary Rynek 84. (1. bis 31. März 2005)
- "Zwischenstation in Bamberg: Julius von Minutoli (1804-1860) zwischen Berlin und Persien". Ausstellung im Stadtarchiv Bamberg, 16. November 2005 - 27. Januar 2006;

"Julius von Minutoli - In der Keimzeit der Demokratie Berliner Polizeipräsident" Berliner Polizeipräsidium (20. Juli bis 10. August 2006)
