= Minutoli family =

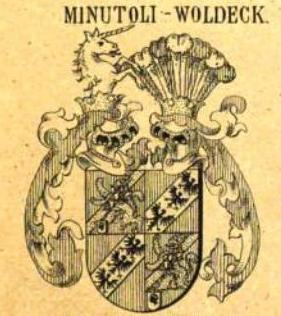
Coat of Arms of the Minutoli-Wolbeck family

The von Minutoli family is a German noble family, originally came from Lucca or Naples and spread over into Switzerland during the 17th century. Members of the family were awarded with the title of Freiherr and held significant military positions within the Kingdom of Prussia. Over the time, two branches of the family were formed, the Minutoli line and the line of Minutoli-Wolbeck, formed by legitimate male-line descendants of Alexander von Minutoli (1806-1887), son of Heinrich Menu von Minutoli and his uncle, Julius Rudolph Ottomar Freiherr von Minutoli.

== Notable members ==
- Enrico Minutoli, Italian Cardinal
- Giacomo Minutoli
- Heinrich Menu von Minutoli (1772–1846), Prussian Generalmajor, explorer and archaeologist
- Julius Rudolph Ottomar Freiherr von Minutoli (1804–1860), Prussian chief of police, diplomat, scientist and author
- Wolfardine von Minutoli (1794–1864), German writer and Egyptologist
