= Heinrich Menu von Minutoli =

Prussian Generalmajor, explorer and archaeologist

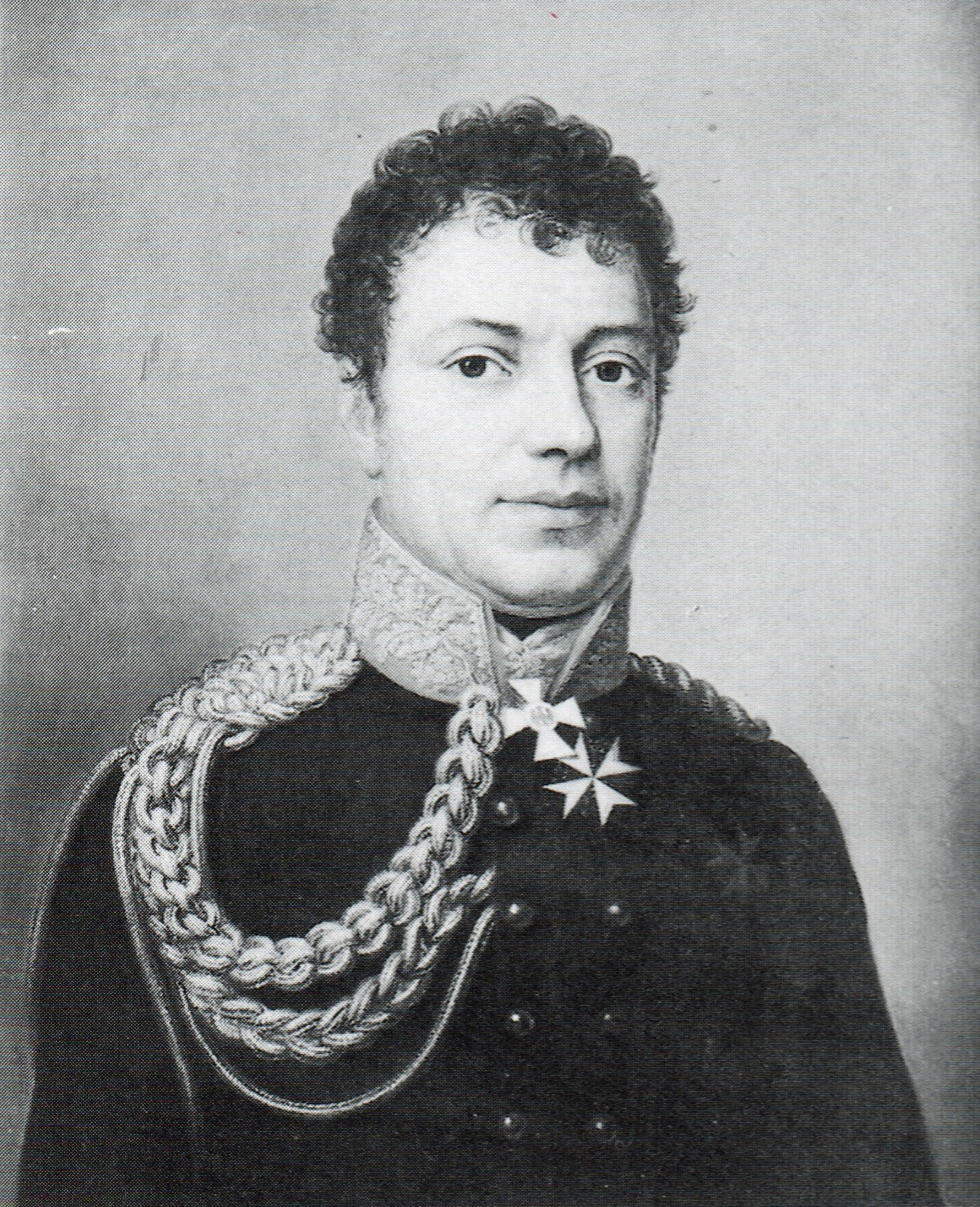
- Born: 12 May 1772; Geneva, Republic of Geneva
- Died: 16 September 1846 (aged 74); Berlin, Province of Brandenburg, Kingdom of Prussia, German Confederation
- Relatives: Julius, Adolph and Alexander
- Military career
- Allegiance: Prussia
- Branch: Army
- Service years: 1786–1793, 1794 to post-1820s
- Rank: Generalleutnant (at retirement)
- Units: field artillery, infantry
- Commands: Berlin officer cadet corps (1797–1820)
- Conflicts: Gustavsburg (War of the First Coalition)
- Other work: Archaeologist and expedition leader (during army service)

Johann Heinrich Karl Menu, as of 1820 Freiherr Menu von Minutoli (12 May 1772, Geneva – 16 September 1846, Berlin), was a Prussian Generalleutnant, explorer and archaeologist from the House of Minutoli.

== Life ==
Minutoli initially received a wholly private education, then attended secondary school in Karlsruhe (1782 to 1784), and was instructed in military matters by an Austrian captain in the engineers. In 1786, aged 14, he entered on his first years in Prussian military service, as a result of patronage from his uncle Moritz, a Prussian general. He served as a bombardier for two years in the field artillery corps, then received officer training in an infantry regiment stationed in Magdeburg from 1789. Also from this date, because the training did not intellectually satisfy him, he learned Greek, Latin, Italian and English. He was invalided out of the military at only 21, however, after suffering a serious arm injury in the defence of fort Gustavsburg in Mainz on 29 June 1793 during the Siege of Mainz.

He was called up again in 1794 as Stabskapitän, teacher and instructor at the officer cadet corps in Berlin for nobles, heading it from 1797. Friedrich Wilhelm III appointed him tutor to his son 9 year old Carl in 1810.

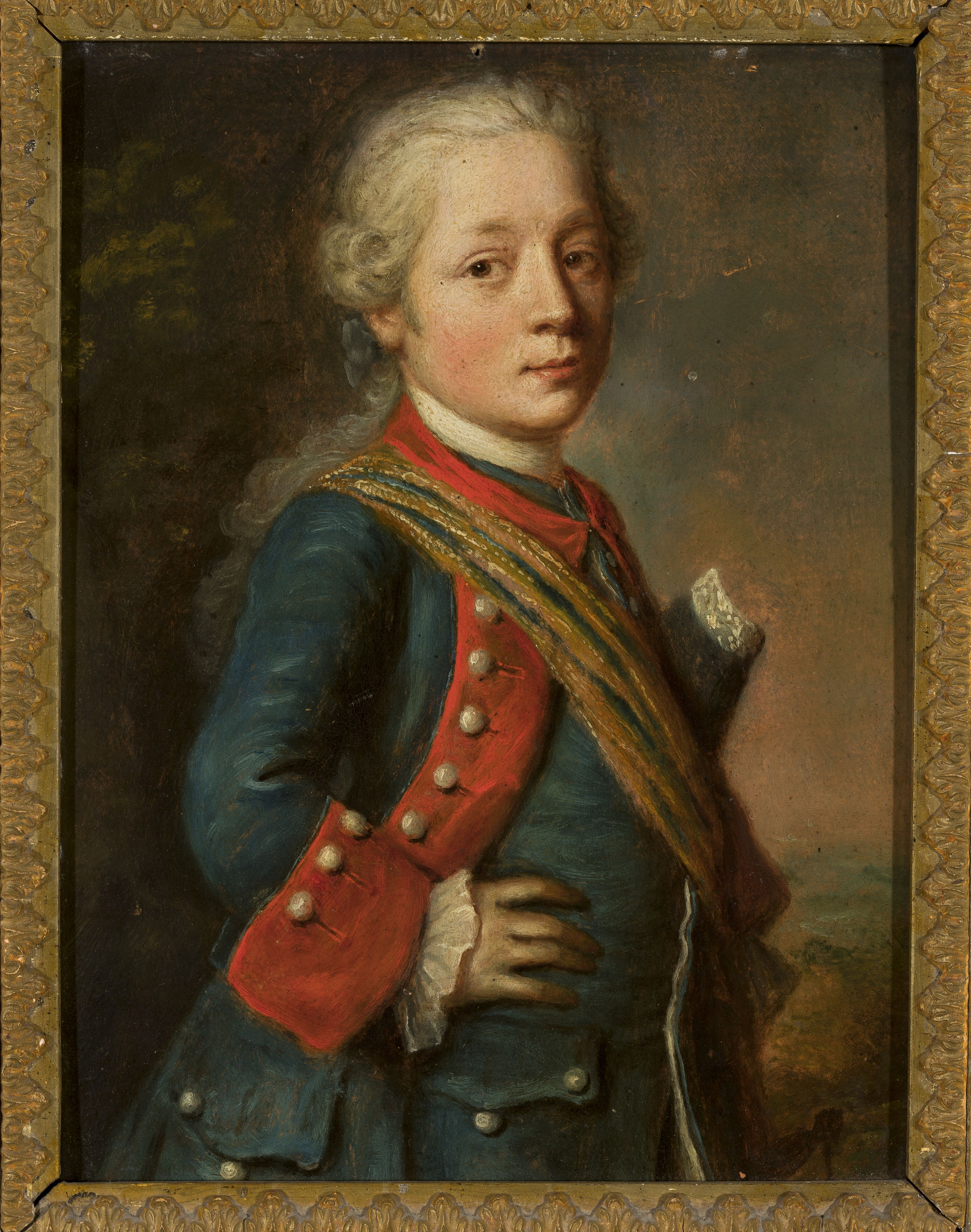
Portrait, c. 1786

Minutoli was highly interested in ancient art and, after prince Carl had reached adulthood, Minutoli undertook numerous foreign trips. He was entrusted in 1820 with the direction of an expedition that until August 1821 was paid for by the Egyptian government. The scientists Wilhelm Friedrich Hemprich and Christian Gottfried Ehrenberg, the architecture professor Liman and the Orientalist Scholz, among others, accompanied him. Minutoli's collections, of which a large part was lost in a shipwreck, were purchased by the king of Prussia for 22,000 talers and formed the foundation of the Egyptian Museum in Berlin. Minutoli was appointed a member of the academy of the sciences, and soon retired (with the rank of Generalleutnant) to his vast estate in Lausanne.

== Death ==
Generalleutnant Freiherr Menu von Minutoli died in 1846 during a visit to Berlin and was buried with honours at the Alter Garnisonfriedhof de.

== Works ==
- Militärische Erinnerungen a. d. Tagebuche, [no publication place] 1845
- Der Feldzug der Verbündeten in Frankreich im Jahre 1792. Striese, Berlin 1847
- Beiträge zu einer künftigen Biographie Friedrich Wilhelms III. so wie einiger Staatsdiener und Beamten seiner nächsten Umgebung. Aus eigener Erfahrung und mündlich verbürgten Mittheilungen zusammengetragen, Mittler, Berlin 1843-44
- Der Graf von Haugwitz und Job von Witzleben. Eine Zugabe zu meiner Schrift, betitelt: Beiträge zu einer künftigen Biographie Friedrich Wilhelms III. so wie einiger Staatsdiener und Beamten seiner nächsten Umgebung. Logier, Berlin 1844
- Über antike Glasmosaik (Berlin 1814)
- Reise zum Tempel des Jupiter Ammon und nach Oberägypten. Berlin (1824, mit Atlas)
- Über die Anfertigung und Nutzanwendung der farbigen Gläser bei den Alten (1837)
- Friedrich und Napoleon (Berlin 1840)

== Issue ==
Heinrich Menu von Minutoli married Wolfardine von Schulenburg (who also became known as an Egyptologist) and they had three sons: Julius (a Berlin chief of police and envoy to the Qajar court in Persia), Adolph and Alexander.
