= Theodor von Holleben =

German diplomat (1838–1913)

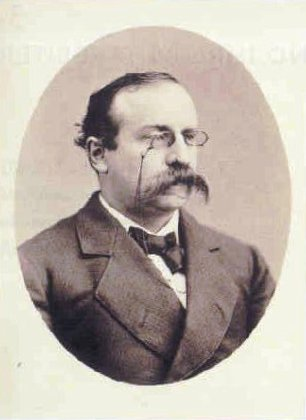
Theodor von Holleben

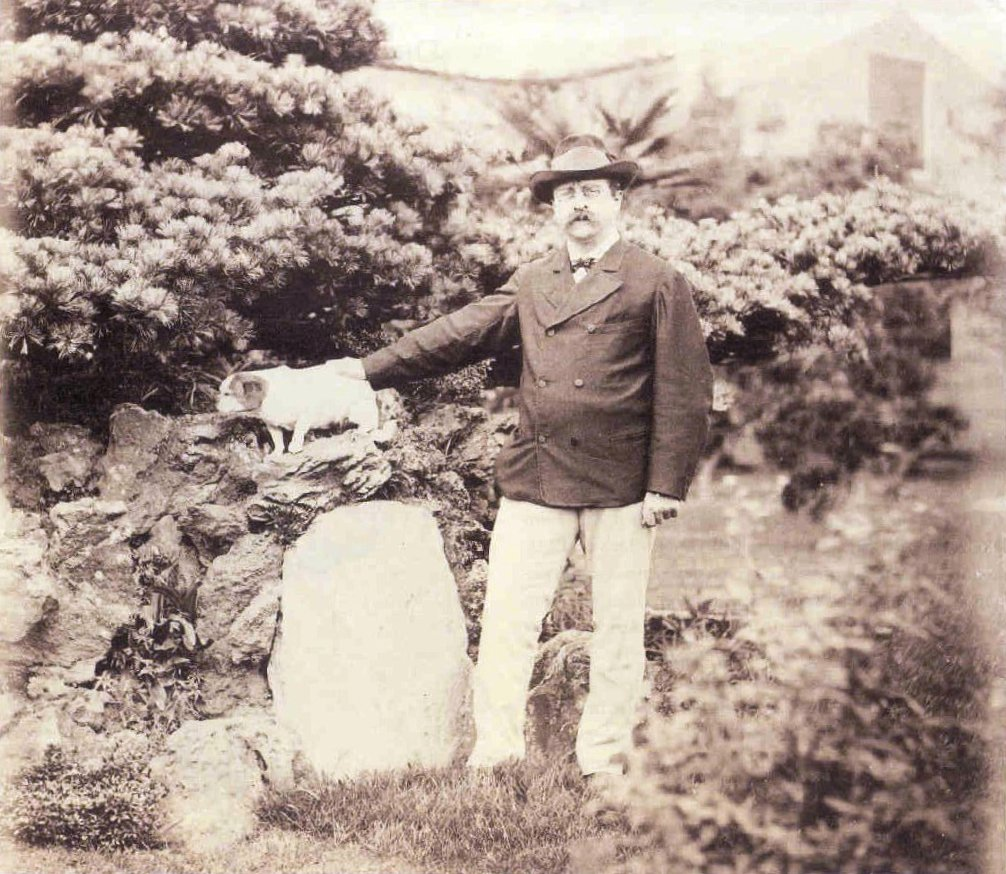
Holleben with dog

Theodor von Holleben (18 September 1838 Stettin, Pomerania – 31 January 1913 Berlin) was a German diplomat, during the German Empire.

== Biography ==
Holleben was educated at the universities of Heidelberg, Berlin and Göttingen; became an officer in the Bodyguard Hussar Regiment; and took part in the Franco-Prussian War. He entered the diplomatic service in 1872; was chargé d'affaires at Beijing, China, 1873–1874, and at Tokyo, Japan, in 1875.

He was accredited ambassador of Argentina, as minister at Buenos Aires 1876-1884. Then in Tokyo 1885-1889, and in the United States at Washington, D.C., 1892-93.

In 1893, he was ambassador in Stuttgart, to the Kingdom of Württemberg, which was one of the 25 countries of the German Empire.

In 1897 he became ambassador extraordinary and plenipotentiary to the United States. The German Emperor William wanted the two countries to be closer aligned. Together with Secretary John Hay, of the State Department, von Holleben had charge of the arrangements for the official visit of the emperor's brother, Admiral Prince Henry of Prussia, in February 1902. The visit was regarded favourably, but did not lead to any lasting change in relations between the two countries. There were reports that the emperor and establishment in Berlin were impatient with von Holleben, believing him to have misled them on the American attitudes to a closer relationship. Failing health together with his inability to have President Roosevelt arbitrate the German-Venezuelan dispute caused von Holleben′s resignation in January 1903, and he was succeeded by Baron Hermann Speck von Sternburg.

While serving in the US, von Holleben received an Honorary doctorate (LL.D.) from Harvard University in June 1901. After the visit to the United States of Prince Henry of Prussia in March 1902, the Emperor conferred upon von Holleben the Order of the Red Eagle, first class with Oak leaves.

== Orders and decorations ==
- Kingdom of Prussia:
  - Landeswehr Service Medal, 1st Class
  - Iron Cross (1870), 2nd Class
  - Knight of Justice of the Johanniter Order, 13 February 1874
  - Knight of the Order of the Red Eagle, 4th Class, 18 January 1879; 2nd Class with Oak Leaves, 18 January 1891; with Crown, 16 September 1893; 1st Class with Oak leaves, March 1902
  - Knight of the Royal Order of the Crown, 1st Class
- Saxe-Weimar-Eisenach: Grand Cross of the Order of the White Falcon
- Württemberg:
  - Grand Cross of the Friedrich Order, 1893
  - Grand Cross of the Order of the Württemberg Crown, 1897
- Austrian Empire: Commander of the Imperial Austrian Order of Franz Joseph
- Empire of Japan: Grand Cordon of the Order of the Rising Sun
- Spain: Commander of the Royal and Distinguished Order of Charles III, 2nd Class
