= Curt Prüfer =

German diplomat (1881–1959)

Curt Max Prüfer (July 26, 1881 in Berlin-Friedenau - January 30, 1959 in Baden-Baden) was a German diplomat.

== Life ==
Prüfer studied Semitic languages at the University of Erlangen-Nuremberg and graduated in 1906. He received his doctorate in the same year with his dissertation on the art of Egyptian shadow play. In 1907 he was hired as an interpreter for his exceptional Arabic language skills in the Foreign Service in Cairo. Early in his tenure in Cairo, Prüfer worked under the supervision and mentorship of eccentric statesman and archaeologist Max von Oppenheim, who instilled in Prüfer anti-British ideology, and a strategy of sabotage against British rule in Egypt. Until 1919 he was in Cairo and Constantinople. In 1928 he wrote an introductory level textbook on Egyptian Arabic.

During the first two years of First World War, he ran Germany's espionage, propaganda and sabotage operations in the Ottoman territories of Syria, Lebanon and Ottoman Palestine in preparation for the two Turco-German attacks on the Suez Canal in Sinai in 1915 and 1916. During the summer of 1916, he served as an aerial intelligence observer with the German air unit Fliegerabteilung (Flight Detachment) 300 in southern Palestine and Sinai. His two years of service left him in ill health, so he returned to Berlin in September 1916, after which he returned to Constantinople in April 1917 as head of Germany's propaganda operation in the Middle East. He finished out the war as the government minder for Abbas II of Egypt, that country's former khedive, or ruler, during the latter's visit to Germany and Belgium.

From 1926 to 1927 he was posted in Tbilisi.

From 1930 to 1936 Prüfer worked for the government administration in Berlin as Deputy Head of Anglo-America and the Orient. From 1936 to 1939, he was head of the Foreign Office on Wilhelmstrasse. In December 1937 he joined the Nazi Party, and was tasked with removing officials with Jewish ancestry and wives. Early in the Second World War, Prüfer was sent to Brazil to confer with President Getúlio Vargas. By mid-1943 he had returned to the Reich and was promoted to head of the Oriental Department of the Ministry of Foreign Affairs, and directly oversaw the Grand Mufti of Jerusalem Haj Amin al-Husseini. In September 1943 Prüfer moved with his family to Switzerland.

In October 1948, Prüfer became Chair of International Relations at Delhi University, the first such position in India.
