= List of ambassadors of Germany to Denmark =

The following is a partial list of German diplomatic representatives to Copenhagen in Denmark.

== History ==
Prussian envoys have been appointed to Copenhagen since 1656, and from the North German Confederation since 1868. The German Empire appointed envoys to Copenhagen since 1871. During the occupation by the German Reich from 1940 to 1945, these were replaced by Reich Plenipotentiaries. In January 1951, a Consulate General of the Federal Republic of Germany was set up in Copenhagen, which was converted into an embassy in June 1951.

The Embassy of the Federal Republic of Germany is currently headed by Prof. Dr. Pascal Hector, Ambassador and is located at Göteborg Plads 1, 2150 Nordhavn, Copenhagen. There are German consuls in Aarhus (the seat of Aarhus Municipality), Haderslev (the administrative seat of Haderslev Municipality), Nuuk (the capital of Greenland), Nørresundby (a city in Aalborg Municipality), Odense (the largest city on the island of Funen), Rønne (the largest town on the island of Bornholm in the Baltic Sea), and Tórshavn (capital of the Faroe Islands).

== Envoys from the German States (before 1871) ==
=== Hanseatic envoys ===
Name	Image	Term Start	Term End	Notes
Gerhard Ernst von Franckenau		1720	1720	Chargé d'affaires (Lübeck only)
Johann Gottfried Masius		1720	1723	Agent (Lübeck only)
Hieronymus Nicolaus Gercken		1723		Agent
Hermann Jacob Forck		1752	1759	Resident (for Bremen from 1757).
Heinrich Carl Meinig		1759	1810	Resident, agent until 1805 (for Hamburg from 1769)
Interruption of relationships as a result French annexation of the Hanseatic cities: 1810-1814
August Wilhelm Pauli		1814	1848	Resident minister, agent until 1829
Vacant: 1848-1855
Friedrich Krüger		1855	1864	Resident Minister
Vacant: 1865-1868

=== Saxon envoys ===
Diplomatic relations were established in 1743.

Name	Image	Term Start	Term End	Notes
Johann von Schade		1700	1703	
Ernst Christoph von Manteuffel		1705	1711	
Jost Friedrich von Arnstedt		1711	1711	
Heinrich Friedrich von Frisen		1714	1715	
Hieronymus von Leipziger		1717	1720	
Gustav Georg von Völkersahm		1757	1768	
Karl Heinrich von Schlitz		1778		
Hans Rudolph August von Gersdorf		1815	1808	
Benedict Christian von Merbitz		1815	1836	

=== Prussian envoys ===
Diplomatic relations were established in 1656.

Name	Image	Term Start	Term End	Notes
Friedrich Christian Hieronymus von Voss		1748	1752	
Wilhelm Heinrich Maximilian zu Dohna-Schlobitten		1814	1826	
Charles-Gustave de Meuron		1826	1830	
Atanazy Raczyński		1830	1842	
August Ludwig Schoultz von Ascheraden		1842	1847	
Vacant: 1847-1850
Karl von Werther		1850	1854	
Alphonse von Oriola		1854	1859	
Hermann Ludwig von Balan		1859	1864	
Tassilo von Heydebrand und der Lasa		1864	1867	Became Envoy of the North German Confederation in 1867.

== Envoy of the North German Confederation ==
Name	Image	Term Start	Term End	Notes
Tassilo von Heydebrand und der Lasa		1867	1871	Became Envoy of the German Empire in 1871.

== Envoy of the German Empire ==
Name	Image	Term Start	Term End	Notes
Tassilo von Heydebrand und der Lasa		1871	1878	
Anton von Magnus		1878	1881	
Maximilian von Philipsborn		1881	1885	
Ferdinand Eduard von Stumm		1885	1887	
Egon von den Brincken		1887	1895	
Alfred von Kiderlen-Waechter		1895	1899	
Wilhelm von Schoen		1900	1905	
Viktor Henckel von Donnersmarck		1906	1910	
Julius von Waldthausen		1910	1912	
Ulrich von Brockdorff-Rantzau		1912	1918	
Konstantin von Neurath		1919	1922	
Frédéric von Rosenberg		1922	1922	
Gerhard von Mutius		1923	1926	
Ulrich von Hassell		1926	1930	
Herbert von Richthofen		1930	1936	
Cécil von Renthe-Fink		1936	1942	
Werner Best		1942	1945	German occupation of Denmark during World War II

== Ambassador of the Federal Republic of Germany ==
Name	Image	Term Start	Term End	Notes
Wilhelm Nöldeke		1951	1954	Consul General from January 1951; Ambassador from June 1951
Georg Ferdinand Duckwitz		1954	1958	
Gerhart Feine		1958	1959	
Hans Berger		1959	1963	
Friedrich Buch		1963	1966	
Klaus Simon		1966	1970	
Günther Scholl		1970	1973	
Werner Ahrens		1973	1977	
Harald Hofmann		1977	1981	
Rudolf Jestaedt		1981	1986	
Helmut Redies		1986	1987	
Rüdiger von Pachelbel		1988	1991	
Hermann Gründel		1991	1996	
Johann Dreher		1997	2001	
Johannes Dohmes		2001	2005	
Gerhard Nourney		2005	2008	
Christoph Jessen		2008	2011	
Michael Zenner		2011	2014	
Claus Robert Krumrei		2014	2017	
Andreas Meitzner		2017	2019	
Detlev Rünger		2019	2021	
Pascal Hector		2021	Present	

== See also ==
- Denmark–Germany relations
