= Germany–Greece relations =

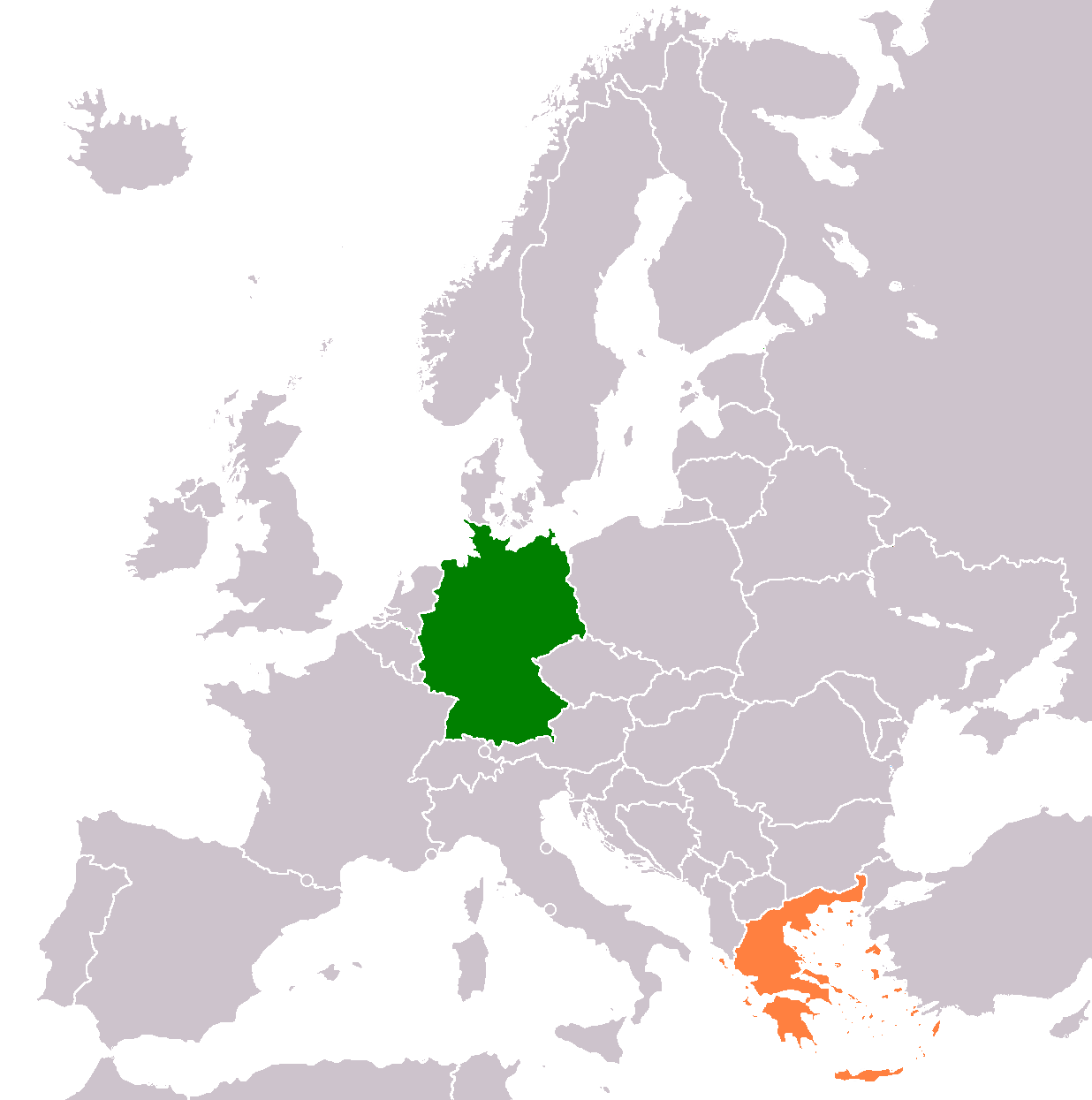

- Germany: Greece

Diplomatic mission
- Embassy of Germany, Athens: Embassy of Greece, Berlin

Germany–Greece relations in their current legal form have existed since 1951, when the Federal Republic of Germany resumed diplomatic relations with initially twelve countries. Greece has an embassy in Berlin and five General Consulates in Hamburg, Munich, Düsseldorf, Stuttgart and Frankfurt. Germany has an embassy in Athens and a General Consulate in Thessaloniki. Both countries are full members of the Organization for Security and Co-operation in Europe, Organisation for Economic Co-operation and Development, European Union, NATO, and the Eurozone.

Interaction between the regions of Germany and Greece has an extensive history prior to the establishment of the modern Greek and German nation-states. In antiquity, both areas came under the influence of the Roman Empire, and the subsequent Middle Ages saw a complex relationship emerge between the heavily German Holy Roman Empire and the heavily Greek Byzantine Empire. The Renaissance revival of broader European interest in ancient Greece was fueled by Greek émigrés from the rising Ottoman Empire, and 19th-century philhellenism in Germany played a significant part in the Greek War of Independence and the establishment of the Kingdom of Greece.

Despite close cultural and social ties, unresolved issues remain in German–Greek relations, particularly concerning reparations from World War II and economic exploitation during that period, especially the compulsory loan of Greece to Nazi Germany. The narrative that Germany considers these issues as settled, interpreting them as reparations that have been addressed, contrasts sharply with Greece's view, which still regards these claims as open and legitimate. German governments have repeatedly refused to engage in discussions on this matter, fostering a sense of injustice and unfulfilled grievances in Greece. As perceptions of historical responsibility have gained importance globally, ignoring or dismissing this chapter not only strains German–Greek relations but also burdens the collective European conscience. The only exception appears to be Greece’s acknowledgment of uncomfortable truths and the collective efforts to confront the Holocaust in Greece, which have led to joint solutions.

== History ==
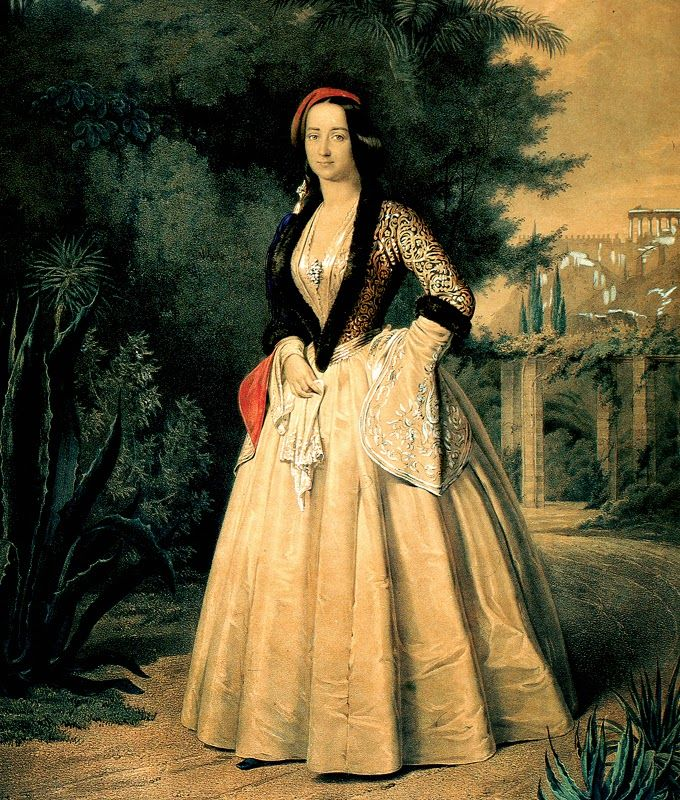
Amalia of Oldenburg wearing the Amalia dress

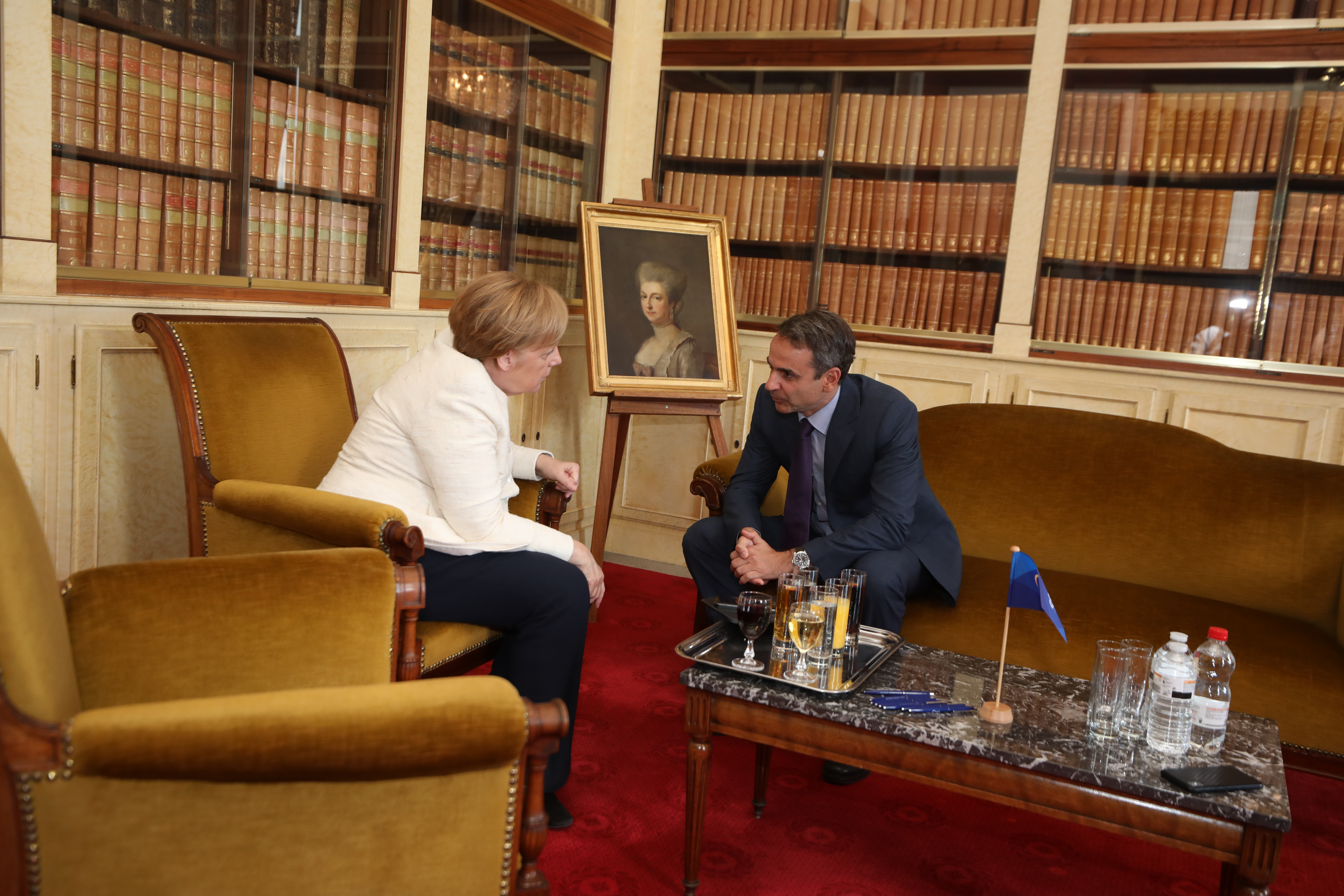
Angela Merkel and Kyriakos Mitsotakis during a meeting of the EPP, 2019

The first King of independent Greece, Otto I, was of German descent, and many Bavarians came and settled in the new state, while his father, Ludwig I of Bavaria, had aided financially and politically the Greeks during their War of Independence and after the enthronement of his son.

Greece and Prussia established diplomatic relations in 1834, the same year both countries exchanged embassies.

The two countries were enemies during both World Wars, with Germany taking part in the Axis Occupation of Greece during World War II. The issue of reparations for German war crimes and the forced loan during the occupation continues to be unsettled.

The two nations enjoyed excellent relations from 1950 to 2010, with Germany being the nation with the most tourists visiting Greece during the 1970s, 1980s, 1990s, and 2000s and the European country which received the most Greek immigrants, mainly in the 1950s and 1960s. Moreover, Greece supported German reunification during the 1980s and the two countries cooperated in many sectors (cultural, technological, military etc.) under the EU spectrum.

In 1999, the Greek foreign minister Theodoros Pangalos caused a diplomatic crisis when he stated that "Germany is politically a dwarf" and later apologized.

However, relations were severely strained during the European sovereign-debt crisis between the nations. Although many media outlets in both countries tried to damage relations through polemical reporting, there was an initiative to counteract this. The most known is the founding of the German-Greek Youth organisation (Deutsch-griechisches Jugendwerk).

In general, German-Greek relations are considered to be balanced, and at European level the countries work well together. Germany has supported Greece in their dispute with Turkey, but not as much as other countries like France. The German minister Heiko Maas has said : "[...]Germany and the whole European Union stand by Greece in firm solidarity". Germany limited the arm sales to Turkey, but they excluded maritime equipment. Germany was also hesitant when the EU wanted to impose sanctions on Turkey, but have said that sanctions are an option and that the provocation of Turkey is unacceptable. It should be mentioned that Germany has already provided Greece with 4 U-214 submarines that Greece desired not to be sold, also to Turkey.

== Diaspora ==
There is a 300,000 people Greek community living in Germany, most of them came during the 1960s and 1970s.

== German community of Greece ==
The German Archaeological Institute at Athens opened in 1874, the German School of Athens in 1896.

== Public opinion ==
Germany was quite popular in Greece before the Greek government-debt crisis; 78.5% of Greeks had a positive opinion of Germany in 2005. By 2010 this figure dropped to 29% .

Today, Germany’s image in Greece has rebounded and significantly improved. In 2012, 78% of Greeks had a negative opinion of Germany, but by 2024 this number decreased to 40%, negativity towards German people is also very low at just 22%.

German people view Greece overwhelmingly positively. A poll conducted in 2025 shows that 66% of Germans view Greece positively while only 8% view it negatively.

== List of bilateral agreements ==
- Bilateral cultural agreement, 17 May 1956
- Treaty of residence and shipping, 2 September 1961, which also addresses military conscription matters for persons with dual nationality
- Agreement for the avoidance of double taxation, 18 April 1966

After 1981, most agreements were made through the European Union.

== List of recent bilateral visits ==
- April 2000: visit by President of Germany Johannes Rau
- 22 January 2004: visit by Greek Foreign Minister George Papandreou
- 3 December 2004: visit by Greek Foreign Minister Petros Molyviatis
- 15–16 February 2006: visit by Greek Prime Minister Kostas Karamanlis and Greek Foreign Minister Dora Bakoyannis
- 23 June 2006: visit by Germany Foreign Minister Frank-Walter Steinmeier
- 18–22 September 2006: visit by President of Greece Karolos Papoulias
- 20 July 2007: visit by Chancellor of Germany Angela Merkel

== Diplomatic missions ==
=== Federal Republic of Germany ===
- Athens (Embassy)
- Thessaloniki (Consulate-General)

=== Hellenic Republic ===
- Berlin (Embassy)
- Düsseldorf (Consulate-General)
- Frankfurt (Consulate-General)
- Hamburg (Consulate-General)
- Munich (Consulate-General)
- Stuttgart (Consulate-General)

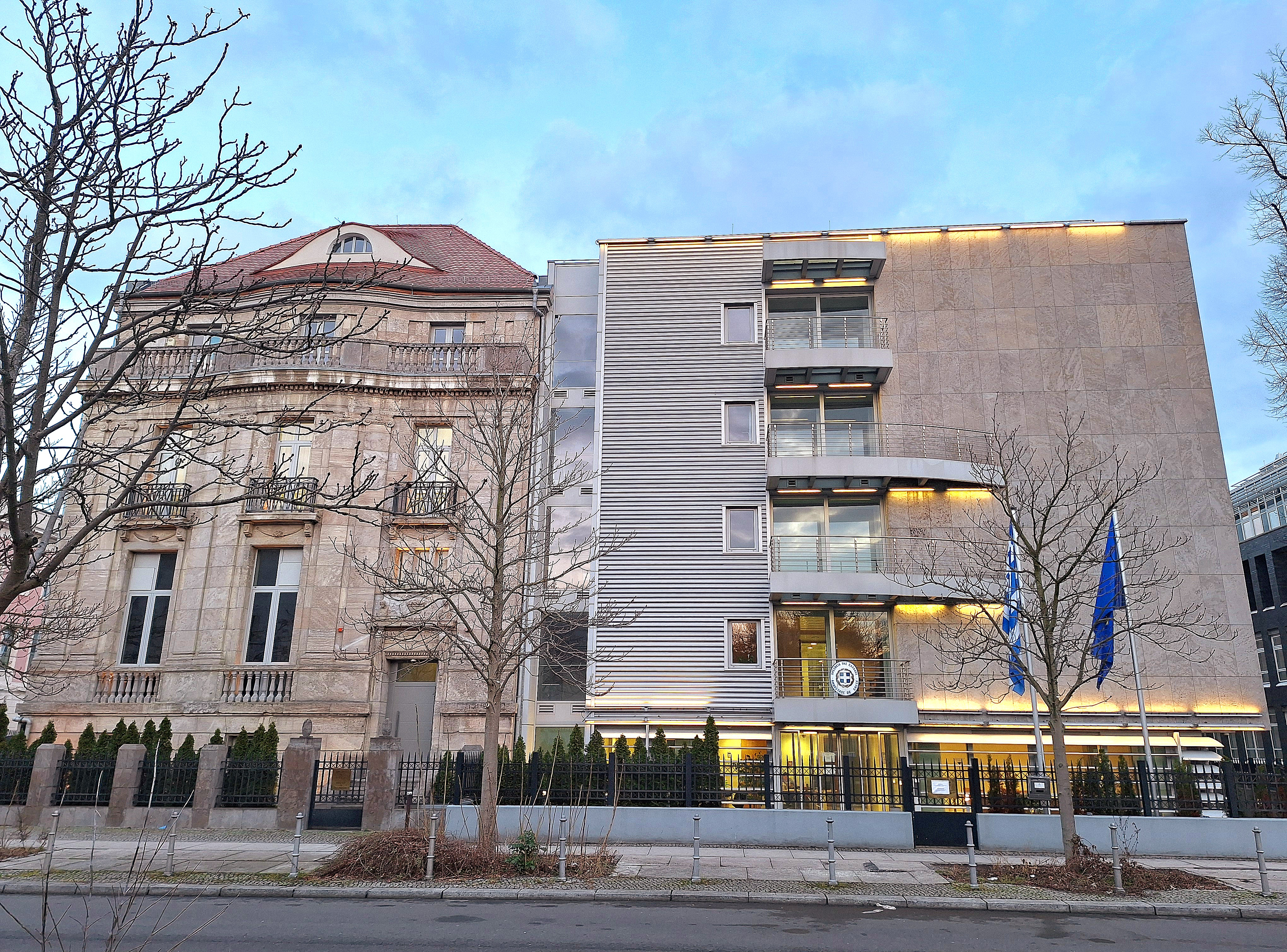
Embassy of Greece in Berlin

== See also ==
- Foreign relations of Germany
- Foreign relations of Greece
- Greeks in Germany
