= Friedrich von Gülich =

German diplomat (1820–1903)

Friedrich Hermann Herbert von Gülich (February 6, 1820 in Osnabrück – January 3, 1903 in Wiesbaden) was a Prussian diplomat.

== Life ==
His parents were Wilhelmine von Gülich, née Henrici, and Gustav von Gülich. After high school he studied engineering, languages, chemistry, economics, law, and political science at the Karlsruhe Institute of Technology, and the University of Berlin. He finished his studies in 1845.

In 1849 he joined the Prussian Foreign service and was posted to secretary at the Consulate general in Barcelona. In 1854 he was promoted to Chancellor.

In 1857, Gülich became Prussian Consul General and Chargé d'Affaires in the United Provinces of the Río de la Plata, with his office in Montevideo, and on September 19, 1857, on behalf of the German Customs Union (Zollverein), he signed a treaty of friendship, trade, and navigation with the Foreign Minister of the Argentine Confederation in Paraná, Entre Ríos. This position ended in 1868, and he returned to Germany. In 1870, he became Consul General of the North German Confederation in Caracas, in 1873 Consul General of the German Empire in Tangier, and in 1877, the first ambassador to Chile. Despite his sympathy for Chilean interests, he strove to maintain Germany's neutrality in the War of the Pacific.

He retired in 1881.

Gülich was married Auguste Schwabe since 1865. They. had three daughters and two sons. Their son Ferdinand also pursued a diplomatic career.
