= Friedrich von Keller (diplomat) =

German diplomat

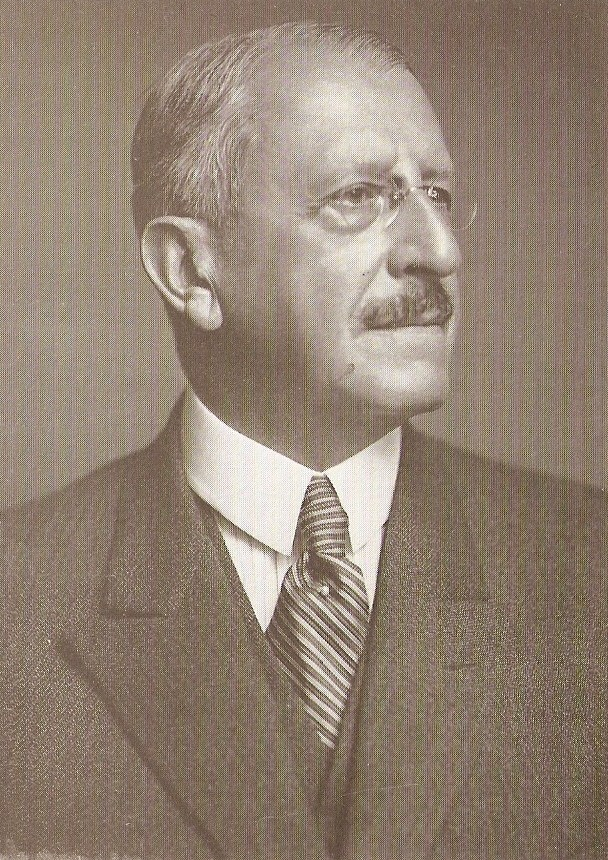
- The diplomat in 1935
- Born: August Friedrich Wilhelm Keller; 7 November 1873; Munich
- Died: 8 May 1960 (aged 86); Tutzing
- Education: Würzburg University
- Occupation: Ambassador

August Friedrich Wilhelm Keller, from 1906 Friedrich von Keller, (7 November 1873 in Munich – 8 May 1960 in Tutzing) was a German diplomat. He served as ambassador in Belgrade, Brussels, Buenos Aires and Ankara, and represented Germany at the Geneva Disarmament Conference in 1933.

== Career ==
Keller came from a family originally based in Swabia, first mentioned in documents in 1733. He was born in Munich, son of the later-ennobled Royal Bavarian Lieutenant General Eugen Keller (1843–1938) and Berta Hassold (1846-1929).

Keller studied law at the Würzburg University, worked for the Bavarian Ministry of Justice from 1895 in earned his doctorate in 1896. In 1899 he joined the Foreign Service and spent the first years in Berlin. In 1901 he was sent as deputy consul to Cairo, Egypt, in 1902 to Cape Town, South Africa, and in 1904 to Maputo, Mozambique. From 1905 to 1908 he was a vice consul in Calcutta, India. From 1908 he worked in the legal department of the Foreign Office in Berlin.

During World War I, he achieved the rank of major in the Royal Bavarian Landwehr, but was recalled to the Foreign Office in 1916. After the end of World War I, he was considering to continue scientific work at the University of Würzburg, but was sent by the Foreign Office to the peace negotiations at Versailles. In the summer of 1920 he was sent as a charge d'affaires in Belgrade, where he was promoted to ambassador 18 December 1921. From 1924 to 1928, he served as ambassador to Brussels, Belgium.

From 1928 to 1933 he was accredited as chargé d'affaires of the German Reich government in Buenos Aires. In 1933 he was sent to represent Germany at the Geneva Disarmament Conference. In October 1933, he experienced the withdrawal of Germany from the League of Nations under the newly elected National Socialist government and chose early retirement. In 1935, he was reactivated as ambassador to Ankara, Turkey. He retired in 1938.

Keller was married on 12 October 1905 in Munich to Irene (7 December 1880 in Munich – 7 March 1965 in Tutzing), the daughter of the Royal Bavarian State Minister of State Robert von Landmann (1845-1926) and Gabriele von Auer. The couple had three sons, Robert von Keller (1906-1940), Rupprecht von Keller and Theodor von Keller (born 1914), and a daughter, Gabrielle. She was married to Guido Dessauer, a notable physicist and specialist in paper engineering, who commissioned Horst Janssen to produce a portrait of Keller. The artist chose to portray him with the many orders he had earned during his career.

== Literature ==
- Genealogisches Handbuch des Adels. Adelige Häuser B. Band XVI. = Band 86 der Gesamtreihe. C. A. Starke Verlag, Limburg (Lahn) 1985, S. 281.
- Maria Keipert (Red.): Biographisches Handbuch des deutschen Auswärtigen Dienstes 1871–1945. Herausgegeben vom Auswärtigen Amt, Historischer Dienst. Band 2: Gerhard Keiper, Martin Kröger: G–K. Schöningh, Paderborn u. a. 2005, ISBN 3-506-71841-X.
