= Robert von der Goltz =

German diplomat (1817–1869)

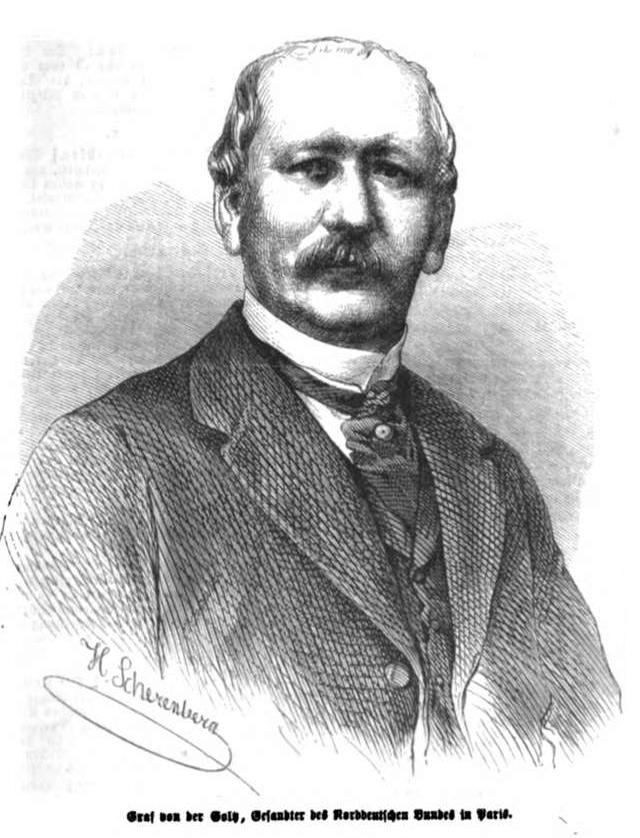

German Ambassador to the Kingdom of France
- In office 1863–1869
- Preceded by: Otto von Bismarck
- Succeeded by: Karl von Werther

Prussian Ambassador to Russia Empire
- In office 1862–1863
- Preceded by: Otto von Bismarck
- Succeeded by: Heinrich Alexander von Redern

Prussian Envoy to the Ottoman Empire
- In office 1859–1862
- Preceded by: Louis von Wildenbruch
- Succeeded by: Joseph Maria Anton Brassier de Saint-Simon-Vallade

Prussian Envoy to the Kingdom of Greece
- In office 1855–1859
- Preceded by: Hermann von Thile
- Succeeded by: George von Werther

Personal details
- Born: Robert Heinrich Ludwig von der Goltz; 6 June 1817 Paris, Kingdom of France
- Died: 24 June 1869 (aged 52) Charlottenburg, Berlin, Kingdom of Prussia
- Relations: Leopold Heinrich von der Goltz (grandfather)
- Parent(s): Karl Heinrich von der Goltz; Julie von Seckendorff

Robert Heinrich Ludwig, Graf von der Goltz (6 June 1817 – 24 June 1869) was a German diplomat and politician in Prussia.

== Early life ==
Goltz was born on 6 June 1817 in Paris into the prominent Prussian noble von der Goltz family. Robert was a son of Karl Heinrich von der Goltz, the Prussian Lt.-Gen. and Prussian Ambassador in Paris during the Bourbon Restoration in France and Baroness Julie von Seckendorff, a lady-in-waiting to Princess Maria Anna of Hesse-Homburg. His elder siblings were Leopoldine (the wife of Lt.-Gen. Ferdinand von Kleist) and Karl Friedrich von der Goltz, adjutant general of Kaiser Wilhelm I. After his father's death in 1822, he grew up under the guardianship of Chief Marshal von Maltzahn. His mother married Lt.-Gen. Karl Heinrich Stephan von Block in 1828.

His paternal grandparents were Eleonore Juliane von Maltzahn and Leopold Heinrich von der Goltz, the Prussian ambassador to Russia from 1789 to 1794.

After being taught by private teachers in Berlin, he attended the Friedrichs-Gymnasium in Breslau. He studied law at the Rheinische Friedrich-Wilhelms-Universität and the University of Breslau. He became a member of the Borussia Bonn Corps in 1835 and the Borussia Breslau Corps in 1839. After passing his first legal examination at the Berlin Court of Appeal in August 1837, he traveled extensively.

== Career ==
Goltz took an active Prussian role in the German revolutions of 1848–1849. He also joined the moderate-liberal party during the reaction period and was appointed as a secretary to the Federal Central Commission in Frankfurt am Main. In 1852 he was elected to the Prussian House of Representatives for the Düsseldorf's 3rd constituency while acting in the opposition. He resigned his mandate in 1854 in order to be able to go to Athens as Resident Minister, before becoming Envoy to the Kingdom of Greece in Athens in 1857, serving until 1859 when he was sent to the Court of the Ottoman Empire in Constantinople, serving until 1862 when he was succeeded by Joseph Maria Anton Brassier de Saint-Simon-Vallade.

=== Ambassador to Russia ===
In 1862 he became Otto von Bismarck's successor (and rival) in Saint Petersburg, staying for one year before again succeeding Bismarck in 1863 in Paris, While in Russia, he was said to have maintained good relations with the liberal Viceroy of the Kingdom of Poland, the Grand Duke Constantine (the second son of Nicholas I and his wife, Charlotte of Prussia).

=== Ambassador to France ===
Goltz served in Paris until his death, first as the Ambassador of Prussia and then, from January 1868, of the North German Confederation. While Ambassador, he had to deal with the consequences of the Alvensleben Convention (which obliged Prussia to assist in the suppression of the Polish uprising). Much to the chagrin of Bismarck, Goltz was said to have maintained a secret correspondence with the influential Foreign Minister Baron Alexander von Schleinitz. He was considered very popular at the court of Napoleon III, and Napoleon's Prussian-friendly attitude was said to be thanks to Goltz. After his death, he was succeeded by Karl von Werther.

He was a Knight of the Order of St. John.

== Personal life ==
Goltz, who never married, died on 24 June 1869 in Charlottenburg after undergoing tongue cancer surgery in Paris. He was buried in the family mausoleum at Luisenfriedhof II.

Diplomatic posts
Preceded by Hermann von Thile	Prussian Envoy to the Kingdom of Greece; 1855–1859	Succeeded by George von Werther
Preceded by Louis von Wildenbruch	Prussian Envoy to the Ottoman Empire; 1859–1862	Succeeded by Joseph Maria Anton Brassier de Saint-Simon-Vallade
Preceded by Otto von Bismarck	Prussian Ambassador to Russia Empire; 1862–1863	Succeeded by Heinrich Alexander von Redern
Preceded by Otto von Bismarck	German Ambassador to the Kingdom of France; 1863–1869	Succeeded by Karl von Werther
