= Karl Heinrich von der Goltz =

Prussian Generalleutnant (Lieutenant general) and diplomat

Generalleutnant Karl Heinrich von der Goltz Count von der Goltz

Prussian Envoy to the Kingdom of France
- In office 1815–1822
- Monarch: Frederick William III
- Preceded by: Break in relations due to French Revolutionary Wars
- Succeeded by: Heinrich Wilhelm von Werther

Prussian Envoy to the Kingdom of Bavaria
- In office 1809–1813
- Monarch: Frederick William III
- Succeeded by: Johann Emanuel von Sexton

Personal details
- Born: Karl Friedrich Heinrich von der Goltz; 8 June 1775 Berlin, Kingdom of Prussia
- Died: 13 October 1822 (aged 47) Paris, Kingdom of France
- Spouse: Julie von Seckendorff (m. 1807; died 1822)
- Children: Leopoldine von Kleist; Karl Friedrich von der Goltz; Robert von der Goltz
- Parent(s): Leopold von der Goltz; Eleonore von Maltzahn

Military service
- Allegiance: Kingdom of Prussia
- Rank: Generalleutnant
- Awards: Pour le Mérite; Iron Cross; Order of Military Merit; Order of the Red Eagle

Karl Friedrich Heinrich, Graf von der Goltz (8 June 1775 – 13 October 1822) was a Prussian Generalleutnant (Lieutenant general) and diplomat.

== Early life ==
Goltz was born on 8 June 1775 in Berlin into the Prussian noble von der Goltz family. He was a son of Eleonore Juliane von Maltzahn and Leopold Heinrich von der Goltz, the Prussian ambassador to Russia from 1789 to 1794 who had been raised to the rank of Prussian count on 19 September 1786.

== Career ==
Goltz was employed in April 1787 as a Cavalry Ensign (German: Estandartenjunker) in the Hussar regiment of his uncle Johann Wilhelm von der Goltz. During the Rhine campaign in the War of the First Coalition, he took part in the Battle of Kaiserslautern and the battles near Schwalm, Hasnon, Edesheim and Morsheim. Goltz became a Second lieutenant in September 1793 and was awarded the Pour le Mérite on 19 January 1794 for his efforts. In May 1803 Goltz became Staff Captain and Adjutant to Lt.-Gen. Gebhard Leberecht von Blücher. As such, he fought in the Battle of Jena–Auerstedt in the War of the Fourth Coalition and was taken prisoner by the French near Lübeck. At the end of the year, Goltz was released. After the Peace of Tilsit, he served briefly as adjutant to Field Marshal Kalckreuth before Goltz returned to Blücher in August 1807. The following year, Goltz became adjutant to Prince Wilhelm, whom he accompanied to Paris to try to reduce the war burdens imposed on Prussia by Napoléon. In November 1809, Goltz went into the diplomatic service and was appointed Prussian envoy to Bavaria in Munich while remaining an active officer.

At the beginning of the German campaign of 1813, Goltz returned to the field at Blücher's request as his Adjutant, taking over management of his headquarters office. During the 1813/14 campaign, Goltz took an active part in the Battles of Lützen, the Katzbach, Leipzig, La Rothière and Laon. He was promoted to Major general and received the Pour le Mérite with Oak Leaves, one of the highest orders of merit in the Kingdom of Prussia, for his efforts in addition to both classes of the Iron Cross in April 1814. After the Fall of Paris, Goltz was appointed commander of the city, remaining there after the Prussian troops withdrew and, after the Treaty of Paris, he was appointed Envoy Extraordinary and Minister Plenipotentiary at the French court of King Louis XVIII. As Envoy, he was given the task of looking after the sick members of the Prussian army who remained behind and ensuring the repatriation of prisoners of war. King Louis XVIII recognized his achievements in July 1817 by awarding him the Order of Military Merit. On the occasion of his visit to Paris, King Frederick William III presented him the Order of the Red Eagle, 1st Class on 19 August 1817. He also promoted Goltz to Lieutenant general on 30 March 1818.

== Personal life ==
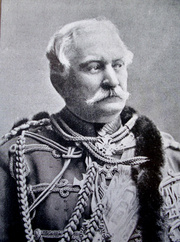
Photograph of his eldest son, Karl

In 1807, Goltz married Baroness Julie von Seckendorff, a daughter of Baron Friedrich Carl von Seckendorff-Aberdar, and Countess Eleonore Elisabeth von Brockdorff-Schney. Julie had been a lady-in-waiting to Princess Maria Anna of Hesse-Homburg. Before his death, they were the parents of:

- Leopoldine von der Goltz (1810–1845), who married Prussian Lt.-Gen. Ferdinand von Kleist, in 1831.
- Karl Friedrich von der Goltz (1815–1901), adjutant general to Kaiser Wilhelm I who married Countess Mathilde von Lynar in 1860.
- Robert Heinrich Ludwig von der Goltz (1817–1869), a diplomat and member of the Prussian House of Representatives.

Goltz died on 13 October 1822 in Paris and was buried at the Père-Lachaise Cemetery. After his death in 1822, his widow married Generalleutnant Karl Heinrich Stephan von Block, the interim Commanding General of the II Army Corps, in 1828.

Diplomatic posts
Preceded by Break in relations due to French Revolutionary Wars	Prussian Envoy to the Kingdom of France; 1815–1822	Succeeded by Heinrich Wilhelm von Werther
