= Von der Goltz =

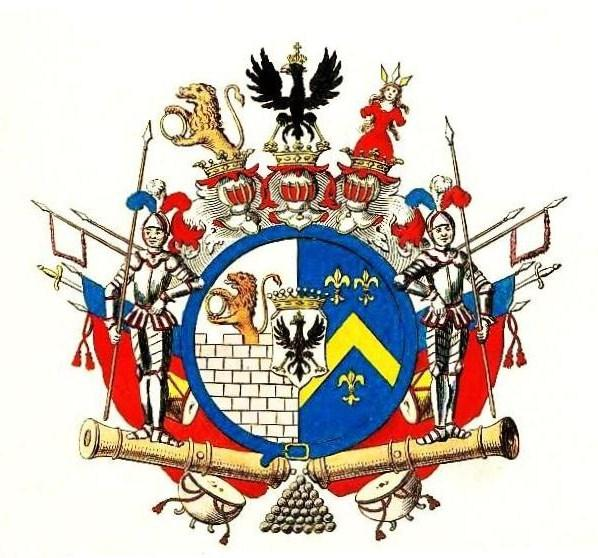
Coat of arms of Counts von der Goltz

The House von der Goltz is an old and influential German noble family whose members occupied many important political and military positions in the Kingdom of Prussia and later in the German Empire.

== History ==
The family can trace their lineage from East Brandenburg back to 12th century. On 19 September 1786 the family was raised to the title of Count in Prussia by King Frederick William II.

== Notable members ==
- Albert Graf von der Goltz (1893–1944), German Oberst (colonel) killed in action during World War II
- Alexander Ferdinand von der Goltz (1819–1858), German chess master
- August Friedrich Ferdinand von der Goltz (1765–1818), first Prussian minister for foreign affairs
- Colmar Freiherr von der Goltz (1843–1916), Prussian field marshal and military writer
- Gottfried von der Goltz (born 1964), German-Norwegian violinist and conductor
- Gustav von Golz (1833–1908), Prussian general of the infantry
- Horst von der Goltz (1884–?), German spy and actor
- Leopold Heinrich von der Goltz (1745–1816), Prussian diplomat
- Karl Friedrich von der Goltz (1815–1901), adjutant general to Kaiser Wilhelm I
- Karl Heinrich von der Goltz (1775–1822), Prussian lieutenant general and diplomat
- Kuno von der Goltz (1817–1897), Prussian general of the infantry and politician
- Max von der Goltz (1838–1906), German admiral
- Robert von der Goltz (1817–1869), German diplomat and politician
- Rüdiger von der Goltz (1865–1946), German major general during World War I, Finnish Civil War, Estonian War of Independence, and Latvian War of Independence
- Rüdiger Graf von der Goltz (1894–1976), German lawyer and politician
- Wilhelm Bernhard von der Goltz (1736–1795), Prussian officer and diplomat

== See also ==
- Goltz
