= Karl von Werther =

German diplomat

His Excellency Karl von Werther

Ambassador of the German Empire in Constantinople
- In office 1874–1877
- Preceded by: Robert von Keudell
- Succeeded by: Prince Heinrich VII Reuss

Ambassador of the North German Confederation to Austria
- In office 1867–1869
- Preceded by: Inaugural holder
- Succeeded by: Hans Lothar von Schweinitz

Prussian Ambassador to Austria
- In office 1859–1867
- Preceded by: Heinrich Friedrich von Arnim-Heinrichsdorff-Werbelow
- Succeeded by: Himself as Ambassador of the North German Confederation

Personal details
- Born: 31 January 1809 Königsberg, Kingdom of Prussia
- Died: 8 February 1894 (aged 85) Munich, Kingdom of Bavaria
- Spouse: Mathilde Lobo da Silveira von Oriola
- Children: 2
- Parents: Heinrich Wilhelm von Werther (father); Josephine von Sandizell (mother)
- Awards: Order of the Black Eagle; Order of Saint John

Baron Karl Anton Philipp von Werther (31 January 1809 – 8 February 1894) was a German diplomat. A royal Prussian Privy Councilor and Envoy, later to the North German Confederation and the German Empire, serving in Switzerland, Greece, Denmark, Russia, Austria, France and the Ottoman Empire.

== Early life ==
Baron von Werther was born on 31 January 1809 at Königsberg in what was then the Kingdom of Prussia (today it is known as Kaliningrad, the largest city and administrative centre of Kaliningrad Oblast, a Russian exclave between Lithuania and Poland). He was the son of Josephine von Sandizell and Heinrich Wilhelm von Werther, a diplomat who served as Prussian Foreign Minister between 1837 and 1841 (after having been chamberlain to King Friedrich Wilhelm III).

His grandfather, Philipp August Wilhelm von Werther, was a Prussian lieutenant general and regimental commander.

== Career ==
Werther studied law and passed his first legal examination in June 1830, however, in 1832 he decided on a diplomatic career and, after passing the diplomatic examination, was transferred to Munich as legation secretary in 1834. He transferred to The Hague in 1835 and, in 1836, was appointed legation councilor in London to Heinrich von Bülow, the son-in-law of Wilhelm von Humboldt. In the same year, King Friedrich Wilhelm III appointed him chamberlain. During the lengthy negotiations during the conference in London on the Eastern Question, he often had to represent Bülow, who was often ill, especially in 1839.

In 1840 Werther was transferred to Paris where he followed the events of the Oriental Crisis (an episode in the Egyptian–Ottoman War) closely. At the end of 1841 he was sent to Bern in Switzerland as Envoy. His appointed was criticized, including by Karl August Varnhagen von Ense, who considered Werther to be incompetent. Nevertheless, he served there until 1844 when he was appointed the Prussian Ambassador in Athens during the reign of King Otto, shortly after Otto was forced to adopt a constitution in the fall of 1843. While serving in Greece until 1849, Werther experienced the beginnings of the German revolution of 1848.

=== Copenhagen ===
In 1849 Werther was transferred to Copenhagen, where King Frederick VII had succeeded his father in January 1848. At the Danish court, he represented Prussia during the complications during the Schleswig–Holstein question and the order of succession. He persuaded Duke Christian August II of Schleswig-Holstein to renounce his claims to the duchies of Schleswig and Holstein and transfer them to the Danish crown. Werned served as Ambassador until 1854 when he was appointed envoy to the Russian Empire.

=== Saint Petersburg ===
In the spring of 1854 he was appointed envoy in Saint Petersburg to lead the negotiations regarding the compromise between Austria and Russia as a result of the Crimean War. A few weeks earlier, King Friedrich Wilhelm IV of Prussia temporarily entrusted him with the duties of Undersecretary of State in the Foreign Ministry. Before his departure to Saint Petersburg in June 1854, Werther had in depth discussions with the King, Leopold von Gerlach, Hermann Ludwig von Balan and other Prussian diplomats. Austria, in consultation with France and Great Britain (the Ottoman allies in the Crimean War), presented Russia with a four-point note as the basis for ultimate peace negotiations. Prussia supported the mediation and tried to convince the Russian Chancellor Karl Nesselrode to support the proposal by sending Werther. After the Treaty of Paris ended the War on 30 March 1856 at the Congress of Paris, Werther received the title of Excellency on 5 June 1856 for his services. He served in Saint Petersburg until 1859.

=== Vienna ===
After the beginning of the Second Italian War of Independence in 1859, Werther was sent to Vienna as the Prussian Ambassador to the Habsburg monarchy in Austria. Werther became a close partner to Austrian Prime Minister Bernhard von Rechberg. Following the establishment of the German military alliance in August 1866 under the leadership of the Kingdom of Prussia, which became the North German Confederation (a de facto federal state) the subsequent year, Werther was again authenticated as Prussian envoy in Vienna. Like with Rechberg, Werther got along exceedingly well with the newly appointed Austrian Prime Minister Friedrich Ferdinand von Beust. He continued as envoy until 1869 when he was succeeded by Hans Lothar von Schweinitz and became Ambassador in Paris.

=== Paris ===
In 1869, Werther replaced Robert Heinrich Ludwig von der Goltz as the Ambassador of the German Confederation in Paris during the Second French Empire under Napoleon III. He served in this role until 1870 when the dissolution of the North German Confederation when he was succeeded in 1871 by Harry von Arnim as Ambassador of the German Empire to France during the French Third Republic.

After the end of the Franco-Prussian War, Werther retired from the diplomatic service in July 1871 and moved to Munich.

=== Constantinople ===
In 1874, three years after his retirement, Bismarck briefly reactivated him by appointing him Ambassador of the German Empire in Constantinople to succeed Robert von Keudell because of Werther's experience with the Crimean War. While Ambassador, Werther was a participant in Constantinople Conference from 1876 to 1877 along with Count François de Bourgoing, Baron Heinrich von Calice, Count Jean-Baptiste de Chaudordy, Count Luigi Corti, Sir Henry George Elliot, Count Nikolay Pavlovich Ignatyev, Robert Gascoyne-Cecil, 3rd Marquess of Salisbury, Eugene Schuyler, and Count Ferenc Zichy. Following the beginning of the Herzegovinian Uprising in 1875 and the April Uprising in April 1876, the Great Powers (Austria-Hungary, Britain, France, Germany, Italy and Russia) agreed on a project for political reforms in Bosnia and in the Ottoman territories with a majority-Bulgarian population. The Ottoman Empire refused the proposed reforms, leading to the Russo-Turkish War a few months later, at which point he retired again.

=== Later life ===
On 3 May 1879, the German Emperor William I awarded him the Order of the Black Eagle, the highest order of chivalry in the Kingdom of Prussia. His investiture took place a year later on January 24, 1878. Like his father before him, he became an honorary knight of the Order of Saint John His written legacy, which dates from 1859 to 1870, is in the Prussian Privy State Archives in Berlin.

== Personal life ==
Baron von Werther was married to Countess Mathilde Sophie Adelheid Lobo da Silveira von Oriola (1827–1889), a daughter of Joaquim Lobo da Silveira, 7th Count of Oriola (of the Portuguese nobility) and the former Sofia Murray (daughter of Dr. Johan Andreas Murray). Together, they were the parents of:

- Baron Maximilian Wilhelm Friedrich von Werther (1847–1920), Royal Prussian chamberlain and Captain in the Landwehr Regiment; he married Isabella von Ciechowski. After her death, he married Aloisia Schmid.
- Countess Olga Auguste Julie Josephine von Werther (1853–1937), who married Count Maximilian Konstantin Friedrich Alfons von Arco-Zinneberg a great-grandson of Empress Maria Theresa.

Baron von Werther died on 8 February 1894 in Munich.

Diplomatic posts
Preceded by Christian Karl Josias von Bunsen	Prussian Ambassador in Bern; 1841–1844	Succeeded by Friedrich von Wylich und Lottum
Preceded by Joseph Maria Anton Brassier de Saint-Simon-Vallade	Prussian Ambassador in Athens; 1844–1849	Succeeded by Louis von Wildenbruch
Preceded by Vacant	Prussian Ambassador in Copenhagen; 1849–1854	Succeeded by Alphonse von Oriola
Preceded by Theodor von Rochow	Prussian Ambassador in Saint Petersburg; 1854–1859	Succeeded by Otto von Bismarck
Preceded by Heinrich Friedrich von Arnim-Heinrichsdorff-Werbelow	Prussian Ambassador in Vienna; 1859–1866	Succeeded by Himself (as Ambassador of the German Confederation)
Preceded by Himself (as Prussian Ambassador)	Ambassador of the German Confederation in Vienna; 1866–1869	Succeeded by Hans Lothar von Schweinitz
Preceded by Robert Heinrich Ludwig von der Goltz	Ambassador of the German Confederation in Paris; 1869–1870	Succeeded by Harry von Arnim (as Ambassador of the German Empire)
Preceded by Robert von Keudell	Ambassador of the German Empire in Constantinople; 1874–1877	Succeeded by Prince Heinrich VII Reuss
