= Goltz =

Goltz is a surname. Notable people with the surname include:

- Bogumil Goltz (1801–1870), German humorist and satirist
- Boris Goltz (1913–1942), Soviet composer
- Christel Goltz (1912–2008), German operatic soprano
- Dave Goltz (born 1949), American baseball player
- Franziska Goltz (born 1985), German sports sailor
- Friedrich Goltz (1834–1902), German physiologist
- Gene Goltz (1930–2001), American journalist
- Hans Goltz (1873–1927), German art dealer
- Hendrick Goltz (1558–1617), German-born Dutch printmaker and artist
- Hubert Goltz (1526–1583), Dutch printmaker and artist
- Justin Goltz (born 1987), American football player
- Paolo Goltz (born 1985), Argentine football player
- Rick Goltz (born 1955), Canadian football player
- Thomas Goltz (1954–2023), American author and journalist
- Ursula Goltz, German computer scientist

== See also ==
- von der Goltz, surname of several noble Germans
