= George von Werther =

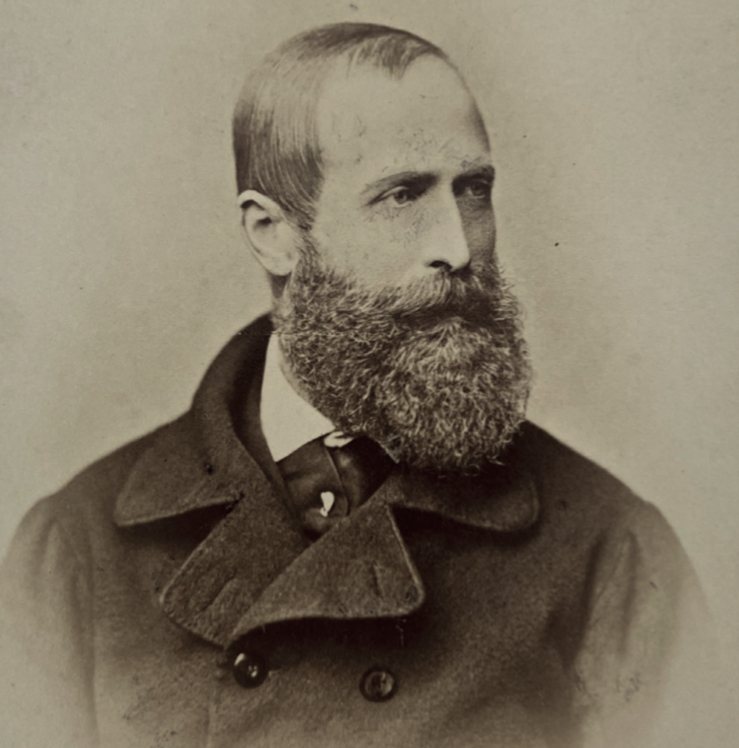
Image of George

George, Graf von Werthern-Beichlingen (20 November 1816 – 2 February 1895) was a German diplomat in the Prussian service.

== Early life ==
Werthern was born on 20 November 1816 at Beichlingen Castle (German: Schloss Beichlingen) in the Prussian province of Saxony and grew up there and in his family's home in Weimar. He was the son of the Grand Ducal Saxon Chamberlain Ottobald von Werthern-Beichlingen (1794–1878) and his wife Luise Amalie von Rotberg (1794–1857).

After attending the Donndorf School and the Pforta State School, he began preparing for the diplomatic service in 1836.

== Career ==
In 1848, he became the Prussian Envoy in Turin and went to Madrid the following year. In 1852, he was appointed Envoy to Vienna. The following year he moved to Saint Petersburg as Legation councilor, later as Envoy to Athens in 1859 and to Constantinople and Lisbon in 1862.

=== Envoy to Spain ===
In 1864 Werthern returned as Envoy to Madrid, under the instructions of Otto von Bismarck, and proceeded to play an important role in encouraging the candidacy of Prince Leopold of Hohenzollern-Sigmaringen for the Spanish throne before the outbreak of the Spanish Revolution of 1868, which overthrew Queen Isabella II. Bismarck supported Leopold's claim, but it was opposed by French Emperor Napoleon III on the grounds that the installation of a relative of the Prussian king would result in the expansion of Prussian influence and the encirclement of France.

=== Envoy to Bavaria ===
In 1867 he went to Munich as the Prussian Envoy, where he stayed for many years at the court of King Ludwig II, playing an important role in the negotiations for Bavaria's accession to the North German Confederation and the founding of the German Empire in 1870. Werthern wrote to Count Holnstein, without consulting Bismarck, mentioning the possibility of a financial contribution to the Bavarian King if he supported the founding of the empire. From mid-November 1870, Werthern and Holnstein played a key role in pushing forward the idea of Ludwig II proclaiming himself emperor, bypassing the Bavarian Foreign Minister von Bray. Their driving motive was to avert financial hardship through Prussian donations to the King's building projects.

Werthern retired in 1888. At his ceremonial farewell in Munich in 1888, Luitpold, Prince Regent of Bavaria awarded him the Grand Cross with Diamonds of the Order of Merit of the Bavarian Crown.

=== Later life ===
Following his retirement, he took over the management of the family estate from his deceased brother. He had a close relationship of trust with Bismarck and created an extensive collection of manuscripts. It was only with the death of his father in 1878, who had been elevated to the rank of Count in 1840, that the title of Count passed to him, as it was tied to the ownership of the Beichlingen estate, which only the respective head of the family held. Shortly before his death, he wrote his extensive memoirs, the so-called house books.

== Personal life ==
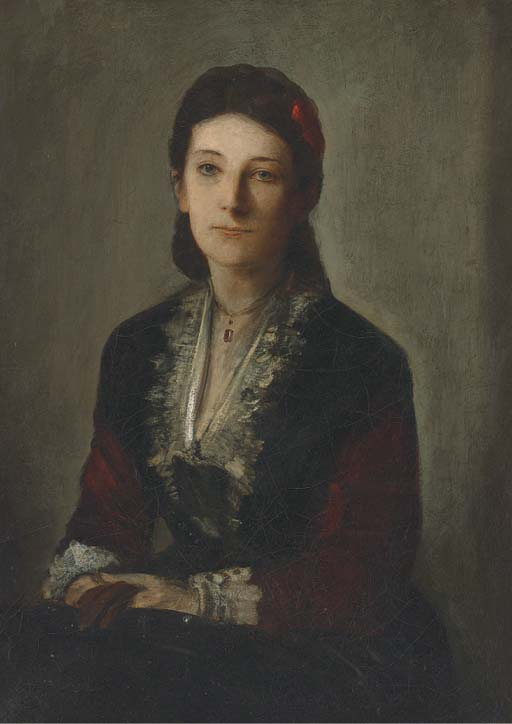
Portrait of his wife, Countess Werthern-Beichlingen (née von Bülow), by Franz von Lenbach, 1870

On 1 October 1863, Count Werthern was married to Gertrud Sophie Auguste Adolphine von Bülow (1841–1919) at Beichlingen Castle. Together, they had five children:

- Hans Thilo von Werthern-Beichlingen (1864–1918), who married Countess Melanie Hue de Grais.
- Elisabeth von Werthern-Beichlingen (1866–1941), who married Aimé von Palézieux-Falconnet, in 1896.
- Ottobald Friedrich von Werthern-Beichlingen (1868–1907).
- Thilo Friedemann von Werthern-Beichlingen (1870–1918).
- Georg Heinrich von Werthern-Beichlingen (1874–1947), who married Countess Anna Elisabeth zu Stolberg-Wernigerode.

Werthern died on 2 February 1895 at Beichlingen. He was buried on the mountain near Beichlingen Castle.

=== Descendants ===
Through his youngest son Georg Heinrich, he was a grandfather of Baron Ottobald Christian-Ernst von Werthern-Beichlingen and Baroness Gertrude von Werthern-Beichlingen (1913–1987), who married Prince Hermann Otto of Solms-Hohensolms-Lich (parents of Hermann Otto Solms) and, after his death in 1940, Hans Joachim Sell of Neustettin in 1950.

Diplomatic posts
Preceded by Heinrich Alexander von Redern	Prussian charge d'affaires in Turin; 1848–1850	Succeeded by Heinrich Alexander von Redern
Preceded by Robert von der Goltz	Prussian Envoy in Athens; 1860–1862	Succeeded by Heinrich von Keyserlingk-Rautenburg
Preceded by Robert von der Goltz	Prussian Envoy in Constantinople; 1862–1862	Succeeded by Joseph Maria Anton Brassier de Saint-Simon-Vallade
Preceded by	Prussian Envoy in Lisbon; 1862–1864	Succeeded by
Preceded by Ferdinand von Galen	Prussian Envoy in Madrid; 1864–1867	Succeeded by Julius von Canitz und Dallwitz
Preceded by Heinrich VII, Prince Reuss	Prussian Envoy in Munich; 1867–1888	Succeeded by Kuno zu Rantzau
