= Albert von Pourtalès =

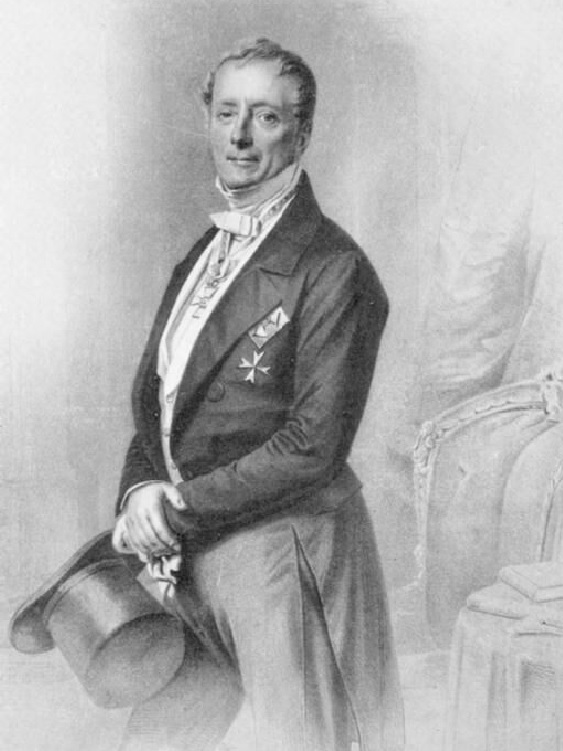

Prussian Envoy to the Second French Empire
- In office 1859–1861
- Preceded by: Maximilian von Hatzfeldt-Trachenberg
- Succeeded by: Otto von Bismarck

Prussian Envoy to the Ottoman Empire
- In office 1850–1851
- Preceded by: Vacant
- Succeeded by: Louis von Wildenbruch

Personal details
- Born: 10 September 1812 Paris, French Empire
- Died: 18 December 1861 (aged 49) Paris, Second French Empire
- Spouse: Anna von Bethmann-Hollweg (m. 1847; died 1861)
- Relations: Friedrich von Pourtalès (nephew)
- Children: Elizabeth von Pourtalès; Helene von Harrach
- Parent(s): Friedrich von Pourtalès; Louise de Castellane-Norante

Albert Alexander, Graf von Pourtalès (10 September 1812 – 18 December 1861), was a Prussian diplomat and leading representative of the Wochenblatt Party.

== Early life ==
Pourtalès was born on 10 September 1812 in Paris into a family descended from French Huguenots that had first been ennobled under King Frederick II in 1750. He was a son of Count Friedrich von Pourtalès (1779–1861), Privy Councilor and Prussian Master of Ceremonies, and Louise de Castellane-Norante (1793–1881), the daughter of the French Lt.-Col. Michel Ange Boniface, Marquis de Castellane-Norante. His brother, Wilhelm von Pourtalès, was the father of Friedrich von Pourtalès.

The family was based in Neuchâtel, which belonged to the Kingdom of Prussia. His grandfather Jacob Ludwig Pourtalès (1722–1811) built up a considerable fortune there as a merchant and landowner. His father, and his father's two brothers, were made Prussian Counts by King Friedrich Wilhelm III in 1814.

From April 1832 to 1836, Pourtalès travelled around the United States. He was chaperoned by British traveler Charles La Trobe and treated to a Grand Tour meant to foster his maturation. On the boat ride to the U.S. they became friends with writer Washington Irving, with whom they would travel for the next six months. The three then visited New England, the White Mountains, and Niagara Falls. Soon after, they met Henry Leavitt Ellsworth, who brought them to Missouri, Arkansas Territory, and what is now Oklahoma to see lands claimed by the U.S. to be set aside for displaced Native nations after the Indian Removal Act.

Using the La Trobe house in Baltimore as a base, Charles and Pourtalès visited every U.S. state except Alabama. The two visited effigy mounds, the imprisoned Sauk leader Black Hawk twice, and attended the powwows and treaty negotiations of the Powatomi in Chicago. During their travels, Pourtalès wore moccasins, smoked kinnikinnick, and delighted in witnessing indigenous activities including lacrosse games. He also engaged in sex tourism with Native women, in order to "sow his wild oats in a foreign country", often indulging in indigenous customs to win sexual favors. In 1833, they visited Fort Snelling and Minnehaha Falls in Dakota territory, some of the first white tourists to do so. Pourtalès and La Trobe also visited Mexico before returning to Europe.

== Career ==
After receiving training, Pourtalès entered the diplomatic service, working in the Ministry of Foreign Affairs and at foreign missions. He was a diplomat in London, Naples and Constantinople until 1844. He then worked as a Legation councilor in the ministry in Berlin until 1844. At the beginning of the German revolutions of 1848, he was involved in drawing up escape plans for King Friedrich Wilhelm IV, which were never used, and was involved in the negotiations for the Armistice of Malmö in 1848.

From 1850 to 1851, Pourtalès was Envoy to Constantinople. During this time he was in close contact with Christian Charles Josias von Bunsen who, like Pourtalès and his father-in-law Moritz August von Bethmann-Hollweg, was one of the leading figures in the liberal-conservative party.

During the Crimean War, Pourtalès advocated that Prussia should bind itself to Great Britain and France in an attempt to achieve a stronger position for Prussia vis-à-vis Russia in foreign policy and to strengthen liberal currents in domestic policy. During the war he was sent on a diplomatic mission to London in 1853. There he tried to represent the Prussian policy of "active neutrality". Since the approach was clearly directed against Austria-Hungary, it ultimately failed.

In Germany, Pourtalès took the position in 1853 that military unity would be necessary through the supreme command of the German Confederation's troops to Prussia. He proposed a permanent ministerial congress of the German states.

Although there was considerable similarity with Prussia in terms of the Crimean War and strategy, Pourtalès was one of Otto von Bismarck's harshest critics during this time and clearly recognized his increasingly functional relationship with the conservatives.

After the failure of the London mission, Pourtalès had to withdraw from the diplomatic service, in part due to the conflict between the King and his successor (later Wilhelm I). Pourtalès then traveled to Switzerland and Venice. With the beginning of the New Era, he became Envoy to Paris in 1859 and, in that capacity, organized Wilhelm I's visit to Napoleon III. His successor was Otto von Bismarck in 1862.

Pourtalès belonged to the Prussian House of Lords.

== Personal life ==
In 1847, Pourtalès married Anna von Bethmann-Hollweg (1827–1892) in Bonn, a daughter of the lawyer and Minister Moritz August von Bethmann-Hollweg. The couple had two daughters:

- Elizabeth von Pourtalès (1847–1866), who died unmarried.
- Konstanze Josephine Mathilde Wilhelmine Helene von Pourtalès (1849–1940), who married the painter Count Ferdinand von Harrach in 1868.

Pourtalès died in Paris on 18 December 1861.
