= List of ambassadors of Germany to Turkey =

List of German ambassadors in Turkey contains the envoys and ambassadors of the German Empire and the Federal Republic of Germany in the Ottoman Empire (until 1918) and in Turkey (from 1924). The seat of the legation or embassy was originally Istanbul, but since 1928 it has been in Ankara.

== History ==
The following lists diplomats from the founding of the German Empire (1871), although individual German countries had been sending diplomatic representatives to the Bosporus or Asia Minor for significantly longer. Since the early 16th century, the Roman-German emperors maintained a permanent imperial embassy at the Sublime Porte; other German states mostly maintained agencies or consulates that were gradually declared to be accredited legations, such as: Saxony (from 1712), Prussia (from 1756) or the Free Hanseatic Cities (from 1841).

Due to World War I and World War II, there were no diplomatic relations between 1918 and 1924 and between 1944 and 1952. The official rank and title of Germany's highest-ranking representative was from 1871 to 1895 and from 1924 to 1933: "Envoy Extraordinary and Minister Plenipotentiary."

== Ambassadors of the German Empire to the Ottoman Empire ==
Name	Image	Term Start	Term End	Notes
Heinrich von Keyserlingk-Rautenburg		1869	1872	
Robert von Keudell		1872	1873	
Karl von Werther		1874	1877	
Heinrich VII, Prince Reuss		1877	1878	
Paul von Hatzfeldt-Wildenburg		1878	1882	
Joseph Maria von Radowitz		1882	1892	
Prince Hugo von Radolin		1892	1894	
Anton Saurma von der Jeltsch		1895	1897	
Adolf Marschall von Bieberstein		1897	1912	
Hans von Wangenheim		1912	1915	
Paul Wolff Metternich		1915	1916	
Richard von Kühlmann		1916	1917	
Johann Heinrich von Bernstorff		1917	1918	
No diplomatic relations until 1924, protecting power representation: Sweden

== Ambassadors of the German Empire to Turkey ==
Name	Image	Term Start	Term End	Notes
Rudolf Nadolny		1924	1933	In Istanbul until 1928
Frederic von Rosenberg		1933	1935	
Friedrich von Keller		1935	1938	
Franz von Papen		1939	1944	

== Ambassadors of the Federal Republic of Germany to Turkey ==
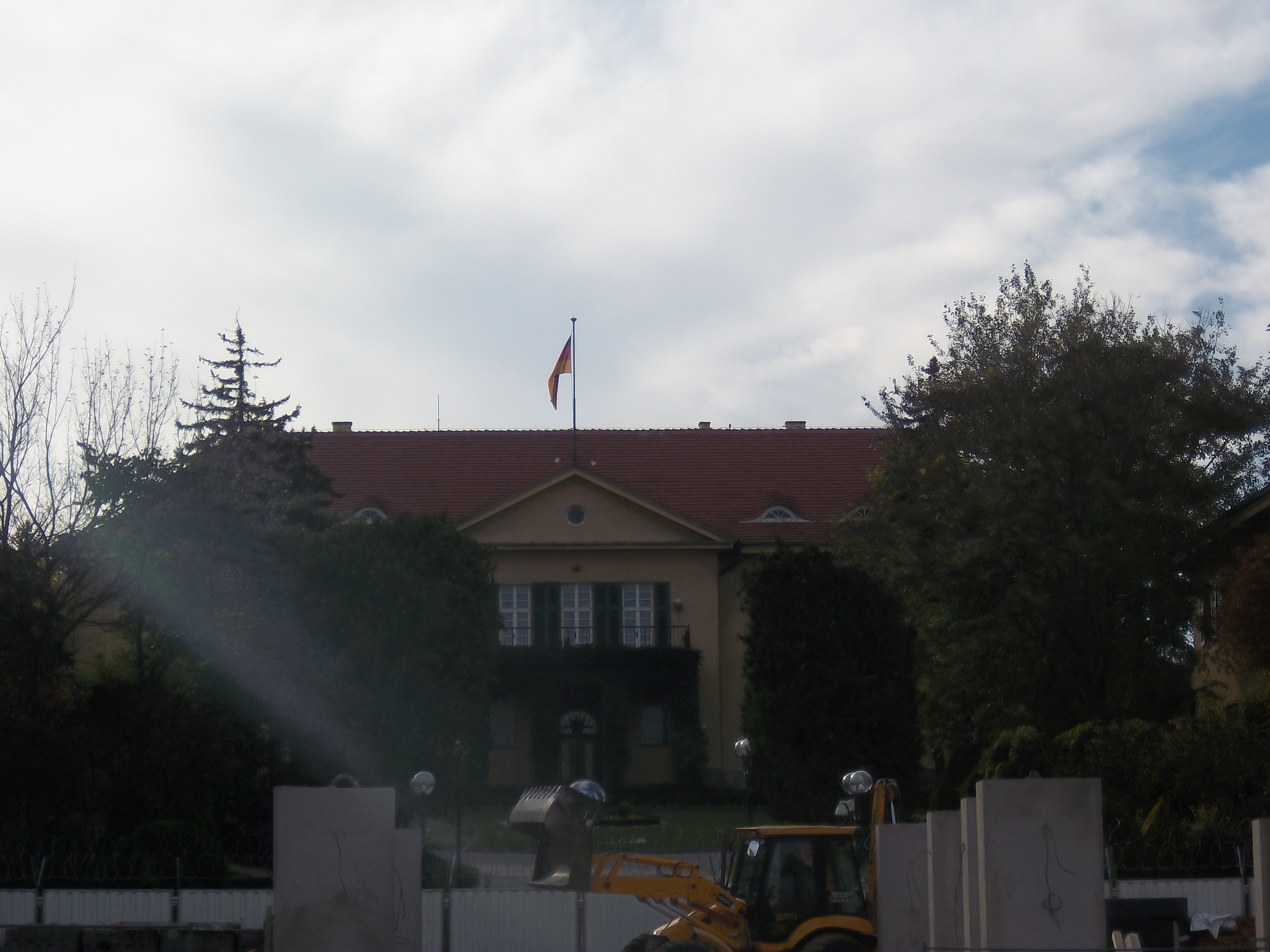
German Embassy in Ankara (2015)

Name	Image	Term Start	Term End	Notes
No diplomatic relations until 1952, protecting power representation: Switzerland
Wilhelm Haas		1952	1956	
Fritz Oellers		1956–1959		
Georg von Broich-Oppert		1959	1962	
Gebhardt von Walther		1962	1966	
Horst Groepper		1966	1968	
Rudolf Thierfelder		1968	1970	
Gustav Adolf Sonnenhol		1971	1977	
Ulrich Sahm		1977	1979	
Dirk Oncken		1979	1984	
Georg Negwer		1984	1988	
Ekkehard Eickhoff		1988	1992	
Jürgen Oesterhelt		1992	1995	
Hans-Joachim Vergau		1995	2000	
Rudolf Schmidt		2000	2003	
Wolf-Ruthart Born		2003	2006	
Eckart Cuntz		2006	2011	
Eberhard Pohl		2011	2015	
Martin Erdmann		2015	2020	
Jürgen Schulz		2020	Present	

== List of Prussian envoys to the Ottoman Empire ==
1756: Establishment of diplomatic relations

Name	Image	Term Start	Term End	Notes
Karl Adolf von Rexin		1756	1765	
Ludwig Senfft von Pilsach		1806	1807	Not accredited
Heinrich Wilhelm von Werther		1810	1812	
Michele Bosgiovich		1812	1815	
Adam Friedrich Senfft von Pilsach		1815	1817	
Friedrich Heinrich Leopold von Schladen		1817	1823	
Alexander von Miltitz		1823	1828	
Karl Wilhelm von Canitz und Dallwitz		1828	1829	
Camille von Royer-Lühnes		1828	1830	
Friedrich von Martens		1831	1835	
Hans Karl Albrecht von Königsmarck		1835	1842	
Emil Gustav von Le Coq		1842	1847	
Vacant		1847	1850	
Albert von Pourtalès		1850	1852	
Louis von Wildenbruch		1852	1857	
Robert Heinrich Ludwig von der Goltz		1859	1862	
Joseph Maria Anton Brassier de Saint-Simon-Vallade		1862	1869	

From 1867: Ambassador of the North German Confederation, from 1871: Ambassador of the German Empire

== See also ==
- List of ambassadors of Turkey to Germany
- German–Turkish Treaty of Friendship
- Germany–Turkey relations
