= Ernst von Wildenbruch =

German poet and dramatist (1845–1909)

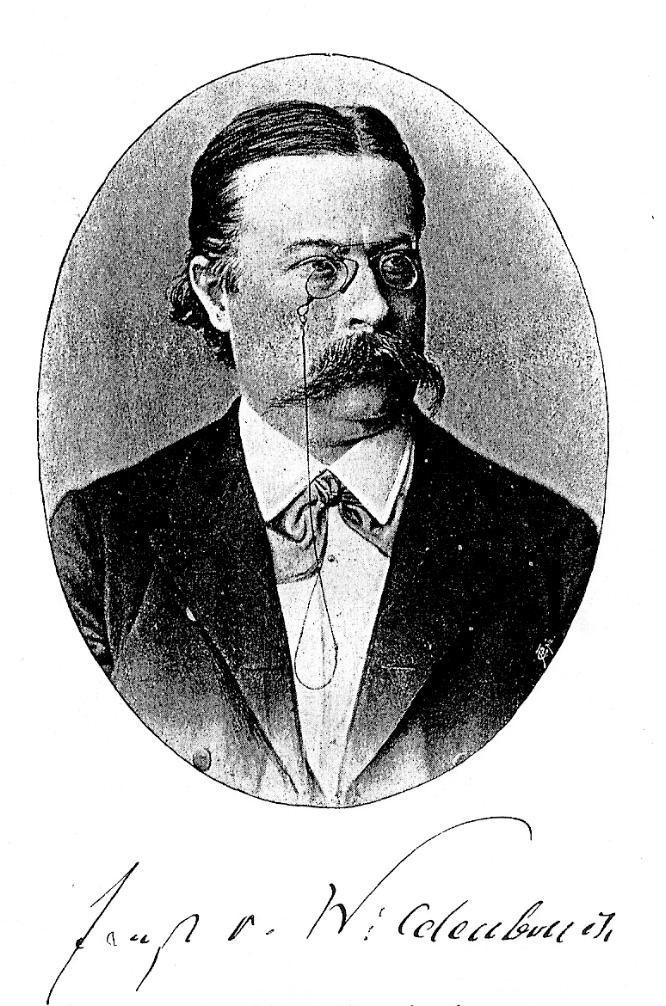
- Ernst von Wildenbruch
- Born: 3 February 1845; Beirut, Lebanon
- Died: 15 January 1909 (aged 63); Berlin, Germany
- Noble family: House of Hohenzollern
- Spouse: Maria Karoline von Weber
- Father: Ludwig von Wildenbruch

Ernst von Wildenbruch (3 February 1845 – 15 January 1909) was a German poet and dramatist.

== Biography ==
Wildenbruch was born at Beirut in Lebanon, the son of the Prussian consul-general, Ludwig von Wildenbruch, who was himself an illegitimate son of Prince Louis Ferdinand of Prussia. Having passed his early years at Athens and Constantinople, where his father was attached to the Prussian legation, he came in 1857 to the Kingdom of Prussia, received his early schooling at the Padagogium at Halle and the Französische Gymnasium in Berlin, and, after passing through the cadet school, became, in 1863, an officer in the Prussian Army. Two years later Wildenbruch abandoned his military career, but was recalled to the colors in 1866 for the Austro-Prussian War. He next studied law at the University of Berlin, and again served in the army during the Franco-Prussian War (1870–71).

In 1876 Wildenbruch was attached to the foreign office, which he finally quit in 1900 with the title of counsellor of legation. He achieved his first literary successes with the epics Vionville (1874) and Sedan (1875). After publishing a volume of poems, Lieder und Balladen (1877), he produced, in 1882, the tragedy Die Karolinger.

Wildenbruch married Maria Karoline von Weber, daughter of the engineer Max Maria von Weber and niece to Carl Maria von Weber, in 1885. The couple had no children.

Wildenbruch's dramas include the tragedy Harold (1882); Die Quitzows (1888); Der Generalfeldoberst (1889); Die Haubenlerche (1891); Heinrich und Heinrichs Geschlecht (1895); Die Tochter des Erasmus (1900); and König Laurin (1902). He also wrote several volumes of short stories (Novellen, 1883; Neue Novellen, 1885; Tiefe Wasser, 1897, and others). He was twice (in 1884 and 1896) awarded the Schiller-Preis (Preußen), and was, in 1892, made a doctor of philosophy honoris causa by the University of Jena.

He died in Berlin in 1909.
