= Miracle of the House of Brandenburg =

Event during the Seven Years' War

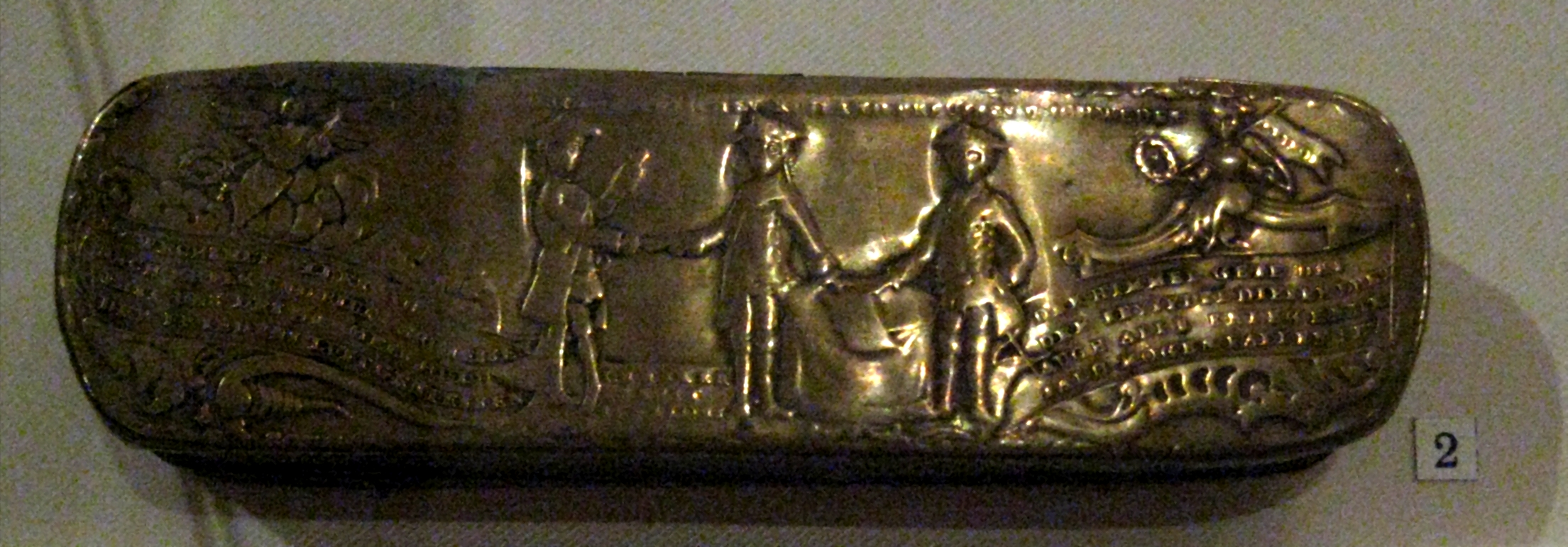
Prussian snuff-box made in 1762 to celebrate the Treaty of Saint Petersburg. Frederick II is shown shaking hands with Peter III of Russia and Adolf Frederick, King of Sweden

The Miracle of the House of Brandenburg is the name given by Frederick II of Prussia to the failure of Russia and Austria to follow up their victory over him at the Battle of Kunersdorf on 12 August 1759 during the Seven Years' War. The name is sometimes also applied to Russia's switching sides in the war in 1762, saving Prussia from likely defeat.

== First Miracle of the House of Brandenburg ==
After the Battle of Kunersdorf, Frederick thought Prussia faced certain defeat. He wrote that it was "a cruel reverse! I shall not survive it. I think everything is lost. Adieu pour jamais [Goodbye forever]". Prussia had lost 19,000 soldiers and was left with 18,000. On 16 August, he wrote that if the Russians had crossed the Oder and marched on the Prussian capital, Berlin, "We'll fight them – more in order to die beneath the walls of our own city than through any hope of beating them". Russian field marshal Saltykov and his army crossed the Oder that same day, with Austrian field marshal Laudon and his army having already crossed the Oder on the previous day. Field Marshal Daun was marching the rest of the Austrian army north from Saxony. All three forces aimed to march on Berlin.

Frederick massed 33,000 men to defend Berlin against enemy forces, which he estimated totalled 90,000. Frederick referred to the events that followed as "the Miracle of the House of Brandenburg". The Austrians and the Russians proved reluctant to follow through their victory by occupying Berlin, and in September, they began withdrawing their forces. The Austrians and Russians had lost 16,000 men at Kunersdorf, and both armies were concerned that their lines of communication were being stretched to the limit by marching so far. The army of Frederick's brother, Prince Henry, was not involved in Kunersdorf and so still posed a threat to the Austrian and Russian forces. Seeing the results of those events, Frederick regained confidence.

== Second Miracle of the House of Brandenburg ==
By December 1761, after five years of war, the strategic situation for Prussia turned bleak despite several tactical successes. As Frederick wrote on 10 December:

The Austrians are masters of Schweidnitz and the mountains, the Russians are behind the length of the Warthe from Kolberg to Posen ... my every bale of hay, sack of money or batch of recruits only arriving by courtesy of the enemy or from his negligence. Austrians controlling the hills in Saxony, the Imperials the same in Thuringia, all our fortresses vulnerable in Silesia, in Pomerania, Stettin, Küstrin, even Berlin, at the mercy of the Russians.

During the war the Prussians had lost 120 generals, 1,500 officers (out of 5,500) and over 100,000 men. Most Prussians now supported peace, and Frederick was trying unsuccessfully to bring the Ottoman Empire into the war. Then, in January 1762, Frederick received the news that the Empress Elizabeth of Russia had died on 5 January: "The Messalina of the North is dead. Morta la Bestia [The beast is dead]", wrote Frederick on 22 January. Elizabeth's nephew, Peter, a strong admirer of Frederick, succeeded her. He swiftly reversed Elizabeth's war policy and negotiated peace with Prussia, with an armistice in March and a treaty of peace and friendship signed on 15 May.

== Sources ==
- Fraser, David (2000). Frederick the Great: King of Prussia. London: Allen Lane. ISBN 0-7139-9377-4.
- Weigley, Russell F. (2004). "The Miracle of the House of Brandenburg". The Age of Battles: The Quest for Decisive Warfare from Breitenfeld to Waterloo. Indiana University Press. ISBN 0-253-21707-5.
