= Wilhelm Bernhard von der Goltz =

Wilhelm Bernhard, Count von der Goltz (6 October 1736 – 6 February 1795) was a German nobleman, Prussian officer and diplomat.

== Early life ==
Wilhelm Bernhard von der Goltz was born in 1736 in Heinrichsdorf, Neustettin district, into the German nobility, as a member of Heinrichsdorf branch of the von der Goltz family. He was the son of Georg Konrad von der Goltz (1704–1747) and his wife, Charlotte Wilhelmine von Grävenitz (1720–1771). Among his siblings were brothers Karl Franz von der Goltz (1740-1804), a Generalleutnant and Minister of War, and Leopold Heinrich von der Goltz, also a Prussian diplomat.

After attending school, von der Goltz joined the Prussian Army.

== Career ==
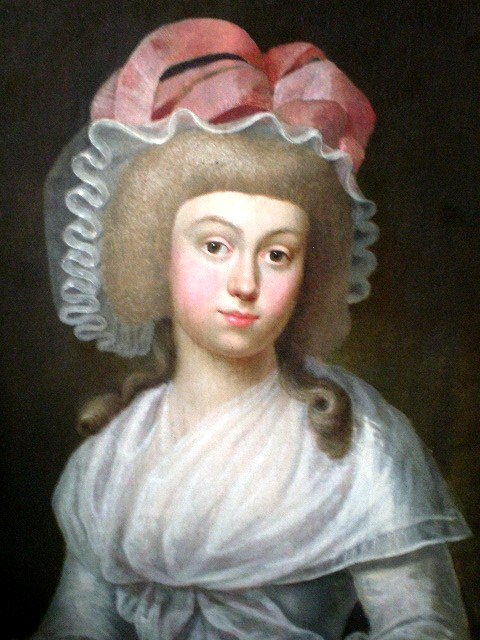
Portrait of Goltz's wife: Cornelia Jacobine von Steengracht, (1785)

In 1756 he became a Major and Wing Adjutant of the infantry. Between 1756 and 1762 he took part in the Seven Years' War and was promoted to Colonel in 1762. In 1762 he first became the Prussian ambassador in St. Petersburg and, as plenipotentiary of King Frederick II, negotiating the Treaty of Saint Petersburg on 5 May 1762. He returned to Prussia in December of that year. As a benefice, he received the position of vice-dominus at the Magdeburg Cathedral in 1763 . He was appointed Envoy Extraordinary and Minister Plenipotentiary to Paris and Versailles in November 1768. He was supposed to do so after the accession of Louis XVI ensure a weakening of Austrian influence at the French court.

After Frederick William II ascended to the throne, in 1786, he was raised to the hereditary title of Count in Prussia and promoted to Generalmajor in 1791.

After diplomatic relations with France were broken off during the French Revolution in 1792, von der Goltz returned to Prussia. In December 1794 he was commissioned to negotiate an end to the war with France in Basel. Despite various difficulties, he managed to end the military actions of the French units against Prussian troops. The order from Berlin of 28 January 1795 to cede the left bank of the Rhine if necessary never reached him. After his death, during the negotiations, Prince Karl August von Hardenberg concluded the Peace of Basel.

== Personal life ==
In 1768 he married Cornelia Jacobine von Steengracht (1752–1821), a daughter of Cornelis von Steengracht and Jacoba Petronella van Hoorn of the Netherlands.

- Wilhelmina Cornelia von der Goltz (b. 1769), who married Frederik Willem van de Schepper.
- Friedrich Adrian von der Goltz (1770-1849), who married Isabella Maria de Perponcher Sedlnitzky (1767-1837), a lady-in-waiting to the Princess of Orange who was a daughter of Baron Cornelis de Perponcher Sedlnitzky (1733-1776) and sister of Count Hendrik George de Perponcher Sedlnitzky.

He died of a bilious fever in Basel, Switzerland on 6 February 1795.
