= List of ambassadors of Germany to Morocco =

German diplomats to Morocco

The following is a partial list of German ambassadors to Morocco since 1957.

== List of envoys ==
=== Federal Republic of Germany (1949–present) ===
Name	Image	Term Start	Term End	Notes
Vacant		1956	1957	
Hansjoachim von der Esch		1957	1960	
Herbert Müller-Roschach		1960	1962	
Walther Hess	Walther Hess	1962	1965	
Heinz Voigt		1965	1970	
Heinrich Hendus	Heinrich Hendus	1970	1975	
Hans Schwarzmann		1975	1978	
Walter Jesser		1978	1984	
Norbert Montfort		1984	1990	
Murad Wilfred Hofmann	Murad Wilfred Hofmann	1990	1994	
Herwig Bartels		1994	1999	
Hans-Dieter Scheel		1999	2002	
Roland Mauch		2002	2005	
Gottfried Haas		2005	2008	
Ulf-Dieter Klemm		2008	2011	
Michael Witter		2011	2014	
Volkmar Wenzel		2014	2017	
Götz Schmidt-Bremme	Götz Schmidt-Bremme	2017	2021	
Vacant		2021	2022	
Robert Dölger		2022	Present	

=== German Empire (1877–1944) ===
Name	Image	Term Start	Term End	Notes
Friedrich von Gülich		1877		Ambassador in Tangier
Gustav Travers		1888		Minister Resident in Tangier
Christian von Tattenbach		1889	1898	Ambassador in Tangier
Gustav Adolf Schenck zu Schweinsberg	Gustav Adolf Schenck zu Schweinsberg	1898		Ambassador in Tangier
Friedrich von Mentzingen	Friedrich von Mentzingen	1899	1904	Ambassador in Tangier
Friedrich Rosen	Friedrich Rosen	1906	1910	Ambassador in Tangier
According to the Morocco-Congo Treaty, officially no relations between 1911 and 1919
Albert von Seckendorff	Albert von Seckendorff	1912	1912	Ambassador in Tangier
Otto Günther von Wesendonck		1913	1914	Ambassador in Tangier
Walter Zechlin	Walter Zechlin (left)	1914	1917	Ambassador in Tétouan
Wilhelm Brosch		1933	1939	Ambassador in Tétouan
Kurt Rieth		1941	1944	Consul in Tangier

== See also ==
- Germany-Morocco relations
