= Kurt Rieth =

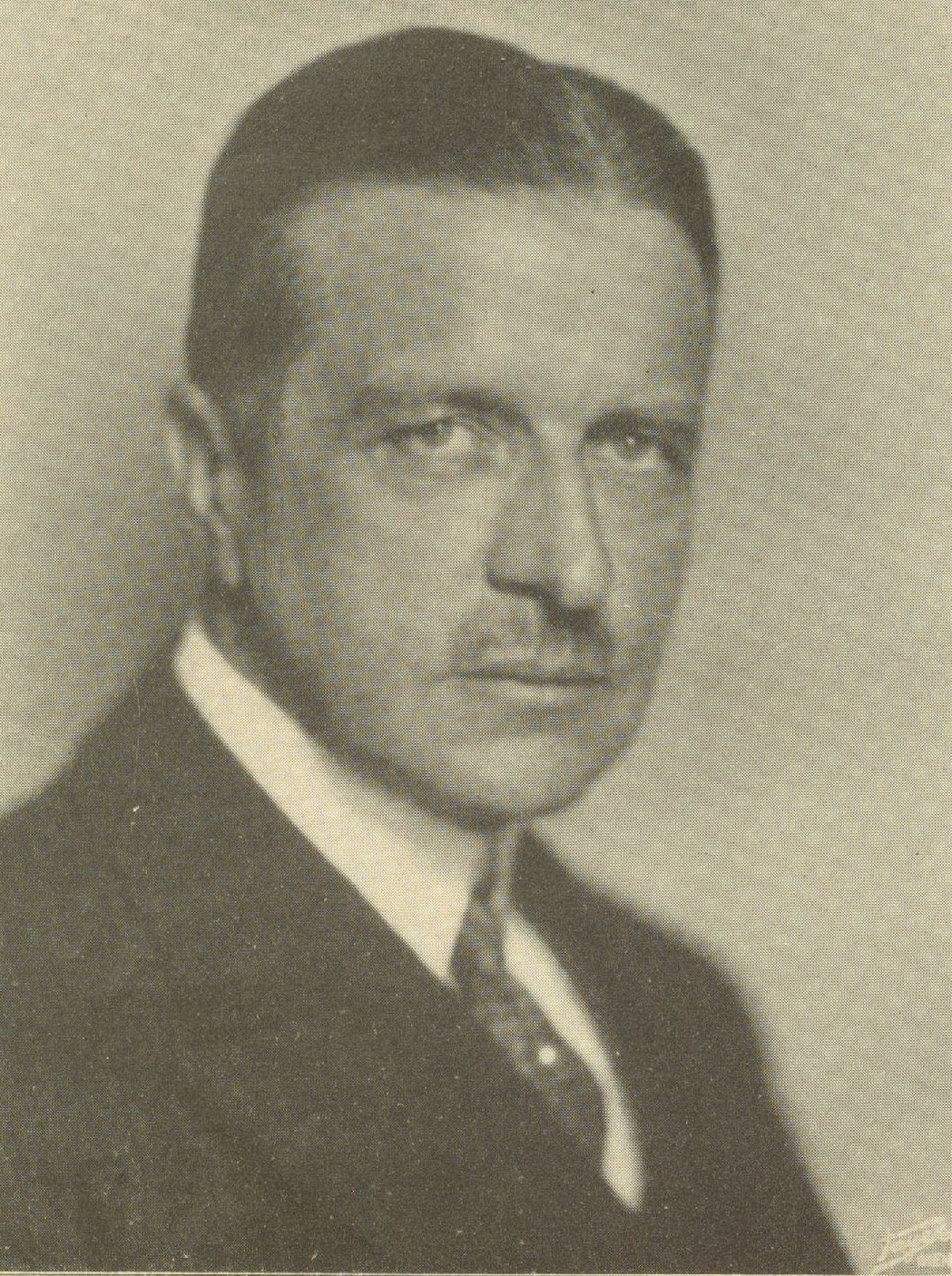
- Photo of Rieth, by Georg Fayer, 1931

German Envoy to Morocco
- In office 1941–1944
- Preceded by: Otto Günther von Wesendonck
- Succeeded by: Heinz Voigt

German Ambassador to Austria
- In office 1931–1934
- Preceded by: Hugo von Lerchenfeld-Köfering-Schönberg
- Succeeded by: Franz von Papen

Personal details
- Born: 28 February 1881 Antwerp, Belgium
- Died: 4 February 1969 (aged 87) Frankfurt am Main, Germany

Kurt Heinrich Rieth (28 February 1881 – 4 February 1969) was a German diplomat.

== Early life ==
Rieth was born on 28 February 1881 in Antwerp, where he lived until World War I. He was the son of Heinrich Rieth (1844–1918), an importer of Russian oil for Belgium, the Netherlands and southern Germany.

Rieth studied in Germany, England and Belgium, ultimately receiving his juris doctor.

== Career ==
When Belgium was occupied by the troops of the German Empire during World War I, Rieth worked in the occupation administration. Between 1915 and 1918, he was employed in the political department of the Imperial German General Government of Belgium.

From 1919 to 1921, he was chargé d'affaires in Darmstadt and, from 1920, authorized representative of the Weimar Republic. He then worked at the Embassy in Rome until 1924. In 1923, he was appointed counselor. Between 1924 and 1931, he was the counselor of the Embassy in Paris.

From April 1931 to August 1934, he was German Ambassador in Vienna (as successor to Hugo von Lerchenfeld and predecessor to Franz von Papen), taking part, among other things, in the consecration of the Kufstein Hero Organ on 3 May 1931. On 25 July 1934, during the July Putsch, Odo Neustädter-Stürmer, Emil Fey and Franz Holzweber negotiated with Rieth to withdraw from the Federal Chancellery in Vienna. In 1935, he was temporarily retired.

=== World War II ===
In March 1941, Rieth landed in Rio de Janeiro from Rome and flew to the southern United States in May 1941. In New York City, Rieth held negotiations with Walter C. Teagle, chairman of the board of the Standard Oil Company. Following a tip from William Samuel Clouston Stanger, Rieth was arrested in his quite at the Waldorf Astoria and interned at Ellis Island and deported by the U.S. Bureau of Immigration in early June 1941. In July 1941, Rieth and two others were exchanged for Americans held by the Nazis (Jay Allen of the North American Newspaper Alliance and Richard C. Hottelet of the United Press).

On 14 June 1940, Spanish troops occupied the Tangier International Zone. As a result, the Germans set up a consulate with around 50 diplomats, which Rieth served as acting director after his deportation from the United States. At the beginning of February 1944, the German consulate in Tangier was closed by Spanish occupation authorities under Luis Orgaz Yoldi. In c. 1953, he received a reparation notice in which he was officially titled as a retired Ambassador.

== Personal life ==
Rieth died on 4 February 1969 in Frankfurt am Main.
