= List of ambassadors of Prussia to Austria =

The following is a partial list of Prussian envoys to the Habsburg monarchy in Austria.

== History ==
Diplomatic relations have been maintained since 1646.

== Brandenburg residents ==
- 1647 Ewald von Kleist, envoy extraordinary
- 1655 Johann Friedrich von Löben, envoy extraordinary
- 1658 Frederick von Jena
- 1661 Johann Friedrich von Löben, envoy extraordinary
- 1672 Prince John George II
- 1673 Christoph von Brandt
- 1674 Lorenz Georg von Krockow
- 1678–16?? Andreas Neumann
- 1678 Lorenz Georg von Krockow
- ????–1687 Bernhard Ernst von Schmettau
- 1682 Lorenz Georg von Krockow
- 1683–1685 Otto von Schwerin (the younger)
- 1686 Friedrich Rudolf Ludwig von Canitz
- 1687 Christian Friedrich von Bartholdi (1668–1714)

== Envoys ==
- 1716–1723 Friedrich Wilhelm von Schwerin (1678–1727)
- 1724–1732: Christian von Brandt (1684–1749)

...

- 1738–1740: Kaspar Wilhelm von Borcke (1704–1747)

Break off of diplomatic relations during the Silesian Wars

- 1746–1750: Otto Christoph von Podewils (1719–1781)
- 1750–1757: Joachim Wilhelm von Klinggräff (1692–1757)
- 1756: Christoph Heinrich von Ammon (1713–1783)

...

- 1763–1772: Jakob Friedrich von Rohd (1703–1784)
- 1771–1773: Georg Ludwig von Edelsheim (1740–1814)
- 1773–1785: Johann Hermann Riedesel zu Eisenbach (1740–1785)

...

- 1790–1792: Constans Philipp Wilhelm von Jacobi-Klöst (1745–1817)
- 1793–1797: Girolamo Lucchesini (1751–1825)
- 1797–1805: Christoph von Keller (1757–1827)
- 1805–1807: Karl Christian von Brockhausen (1767–1829)
- 1807–1810: Karl Friedrich Albrecht Finck von Finckenstein (1772–1811)
- 1810–1815: Wilhelm von Humboldt (1767–1835)
- 1816–1822: Friedrich Wilhelm Ludwig von Krusemarck (1767–1822)
- 1822–1827: Franz Ludwig von Hatzfeldt (1756–1827)
- 1827–1833: Bogislaw von Maltzahn (1793–1833)
- 1833–1841: Mortimer von Maltzahn (1793–1843)
- 1841–1845: Karl von Canitz and Dallwitz (1787–1850)
- 1845–1848: Heinrich Friedrich von Arnim-Heinrichsdorff-Werbelow (1791–1859)
- 1848–1851: Albrecht von Bernstorff (1809–1873)
- 1851–1858: Heinrich Friedrich von Arnim-Heinrichsdorff-Werbelow (1791–1859)
- 1859–1869: Karl von Werther (1809–1894)

From 1867: Ambassador of the North German Confederation, from 1871 Ambassador of the German Empire.

== See also ==
- Austro-Prussian rivalry
