= Harry von Arnim =

German diplomat

Harry von Arnim Count von Arnim-Suckow
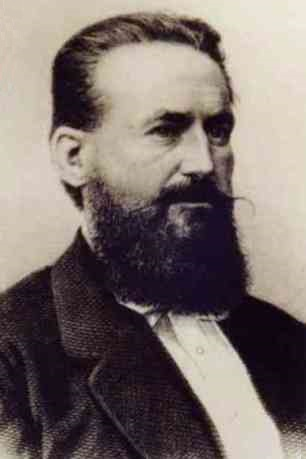

German Ambassador to France
- In office 1871–1873
- Preceded by: Karl von Werther (as Ambassador of the North German Confederation to France)
- Succeeded by: Chlodwig, Prince of Hohenlohe-Schillingsfürst

Personal details
- Born: Harry Karl Kurt Eduard von Arnim zu Suckow; 3 October 1824 Moitzelfitz estate, Pomerania, Prussia
- Died: 19 May 1881 (aged 56) Nice, France
- Relations: Heinrich von Arnim (uncle)
- Occupation: Diplomat

Harry Karl Kurt Eduard, Count von Arnim-Suckow (3 October 1824 – 19 May 1881) was a German diplomat.

== Early life ==
He was born at the Moitzelfitz estate in Pomerania, a son of Christian Ernst von Arnim zu Suckow and Friederike Auguste Elisabeth von Blankenburg. He was raised by his uncle Heinrich von Arnim, who was Prussian ambassador at Paris and foreign minister in March 1848, while Count Arnim-Boytzenburg, whose daughter Harry von Arnim afterwards married, was Minister President.

Harry von Arnim studied law and entered the diplomatic service.

== Career ==
After serving in some other posts, he was appointed ambassador to the Pope in 1864, and during the First Vatican Council (1869-1870), as ambassador of the North German Confederation, supported the German bishops who opposed the dogma of papal infallibility. He was made a count in 1870 and, during the next year, took a prominent part in the negotiations preceding the Treaty of Frankfort.

Due to his success in the treaty negotiations, he received an appointment as ambassador to France in 1872, a post of great difficulty and responsibility. Differences soon arose between him and Chancellor Otto von Bismarck: Arnim wished to support the monarchical party that was trying to overthrow Adolphe Thiers, but Bismarck ordered him to stand aloof from all French parties. Although Arnim did not give the implicit obedience to his instructions that Bismarck required, Bismarck found himself unable to recall him because of the great influence that Arnim enjoyed at court and the confidence that the Kaiser placed in him. He was looked upon by the Conservative Party, which were trying to overthrow Bismarck, as his successor, and it is said that he was closely connected with the court intrigues against the Chancellor.

In 1874, Bismarck secured Armin's transfer to Constantinople, but that appointment was immediately revoked. A Vienna newspaper published some correspondence on the Vatican Council, including confidential dispatches of Arnim, with the object of showing that he had demonstrated greater foresight than Bismarck. It was then found that a considerable number of papers were missing from the Paris embassy, and on 4 October, Arnim was arrested on the charge of embezzling state papers. That recourse to the criminal law against a man of his rank, who had held one of the most important diplomatic posts, caused great astonishment. His defense was that the papers were not official, and he was acquitted on the charge of embezzlement but convicted of undue delay in restoring official papers and condemned to three months' imprisonment. On appeal, the sentence was increased to nine months.

Arnim escaped punishment by remaining outside of the German Empire, chiefly in Austria. In 1875, he anonymously published in Zurich the pamphlet "Pro nihilo" (meaning 'for nothing' or 'without cause'), in which he attempted to show that the attack on him had been caused by Bismarck's personal jealousy. For that, he was accused of treason, insult to the emperor and libelling Bismarck and, in his absence, condemned to five years' penal servitude. From his exile in Austria, he published two more pamphlets on the ecclesiastical policy of Prussia, "Der Nunzius kommt!" (Vienna, 1878) and "Quid faciamus nos?" (Vienna, 1879). He made repeated attempts, which were supported by his family, to be allowed to return to Germany to take his trial afresh on the charge of treason. His request had just been granted when he died in Nice, France.

=== Legacy ===
In 1876, Bismarck carried an amendment to the criminal code to make it an offence punishable with imprisonment or a fine up to the equivalent of £250 for an official of the Foreign Office to communicate to others official documents or for an envoy to act contrary to his instructions. The clauses were commonly spoken of in Germany as the "Arnim paragraphs".

== Personal life ==
Arnim married Luise Elisabeth von Prillwitz (1827–1854), a daughter of Auguste von Prillwitz. They were the parents of:

- Henning August von Arnim-Schlagenthin (1851–1910), who married Princess Anna of Toerring-Jettenbach in 1888. After her death, he married Elizabeth Beauchamp in 1891. After his death, she married Frank Russell, 2nd Earl Russell.
- Johannes von Arnim (1854–1880), who died unmarried.

After Luise's death, he was married to Sophie von Arnim (1836–1918), a daughter of Adolf Heinrich von Arnim-Boitzenburg and Anna Caroline von der Schulenburg. They were the parents of:

- Margarete von Arnim (1859–1940), who married Johann Friedrich Bernd von Arnim.
- Caroline von Arnim (1865–1898), who married Clemens Adolf von Einsiedel.
- Elise "Elly" Adolfine von Arnim

Count von Arnim died in Nice, France on 19 May 1881.

== Honours ==
He received the following orders and decorations:

- Kingdom of Prussia:
  - Knight of the Red Eagle, 2nd Class with Star
  - Knight of Honour of the Johanniter Order
- Austrian Empire: Commander of the Imperial Order of Leopold
- Kingdom of Bavaria: Grand Cross of the Merit Order of St. Michael
- French Empire: Officer of the Legion of Honour
- Electorate of Hesse: Grand Cross of the Wilhelmsorden
- Mecklenburg: Grand Cross of the Wendish Crown, with Crown in Ore
- Kingdom of Portugal: Grand Cross of the Military Order of Christ
