= List of ambassadors of Germany to Austria =

Ambassadors of Germany to Austria

The following is a partial list of German ambassadors to Austria.

== History ==
Prior to the North German Confederation, there were Ambassadors to Austria from Prussia, Saxony, and Württemberg among others.

The Embassy of the Federal Republic of Germany is in Vienna at Gauermanngasse 2-4, 1030 Wien, and the current Ambassador is Vito Cecere. There are consuls located in Bregenz (the capital of Vorarlberg), Graz (the capital of Styria), Innsbruck (the capital of Tyrol), Linz (the capital of Upper Austria), and Salzburg (the capital of Salzburg).

== Ambassador ==
Name	Image	Term Start	Term End	Notes
North German Confederation
Karl von Werther		1867	1869	Previously the Prussian ambassador to Austria (from 1859)
Hans Lothar von Schweinitz		1869	1871	
/ / / German Empire
Hans Lothar von Schweinitz		1871	1876	
Graf Otto zu Stolberg-Wernigerode		1876	1878	
Heinrich VII, Prince Reuss		1878	1894	
Philipp zu Eulenburg-Hertefeld		1894	1902	
Karl von Wedel		1902	1907	
Heinrich Leonhard von Tschirschky und Bögendorff		1907	1916	
Botho von Wedel		1916	1919	
Prince Wilhelm zu Stolberg-Wernigerode		1919	1920	
Frederic von Rosenberg		1920	1922	
Maximilian Pfeiffer		1922	1926	
Hugo Graf von und zu Lerchenfeld auf Köfering und Schönberg		1926	1931	
Kurt Rieth		1931	1934	
Franz von Papen		1934	1938	
"Annexation" of Austria to the German Reich: 1938–1945
/ Federal Republic of Germany
Carl-Hermann Müller-Graaf		1953	1961	
Friedrich Janz		1961	1963	
Josef Löns		1963	1970	
Hans Schirmer		1970	1974	
Horst Grabert		1974	1979	
Maximilian von Podewils-Dürniz		1979	1982	
Hans Heinrich Noebel		1982	1986	
Dietrich Graf von Brühl		1986	1990	
Philipp Jenninger		1991	1995	
Ursula Seiler-Albring		1995	1999	
Wiltrud Holik		1999	2002	
Hans-Henning Horstmann		2002	2006	
Gerd Westdickenberg		2006	2009	
Hans Henning Blomeyer-Bartenstein		2009	2012	
Detlev Rünger		2012	2015	
Johannes Haindl		2015	2019	
Ralf Beste		2019	2022	
Michael Klor-Berchtold		2022	2023	
Vito Cecere		since 2023		

== See also ==
- Germany–Austria relations
- Permanent Representative of Germany to the United Nations
