= Treaty of Saint Petersburg (1762) =

Treaty ending the Seven Years' War between Prussia and Russia

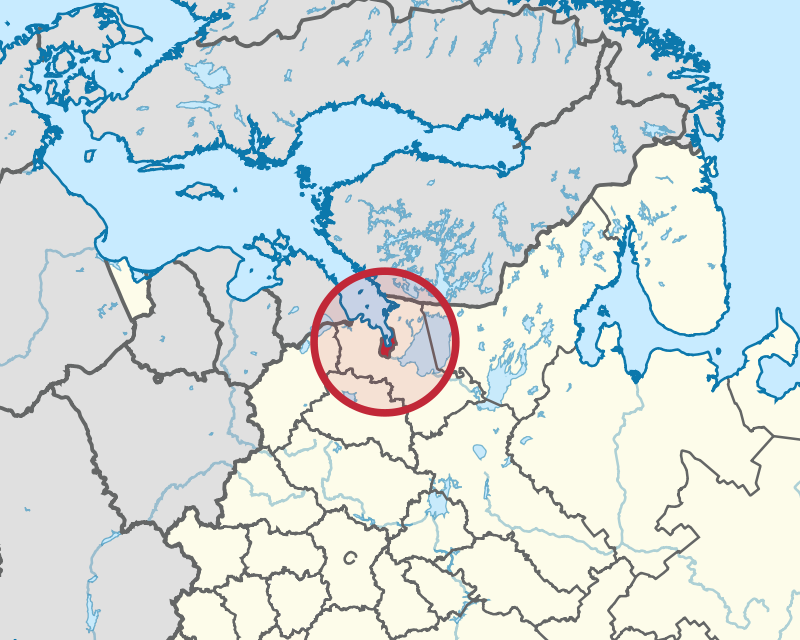
Location of Saint Petersburg in Russia.

The Treaty of Saint Petersburg was concluded on 5 May 1762, and ended the fighting in the Seven Years' War between Prussia and Russia. The treaty followed the accession of Emperor Peter III, who admired the Prussian king Frederick the Great. It allowed the latter to concentrate on his other enemies, Austria and Saxony, in what became known as the Second Miracle of the House of Brandenburg.

The treaty was signed on by Chancellor Vorontsov for Russia and for Prussia by its envoy, Baron Wilhelm Bernhard von der Goltz. Russia pledged to assist in concluding peace among the individual participants in the Seven Years' War and to return to Prussia all lands occupied by Russian troops during the war. The intent to return the land was made known before the signing of the treaty; on 23 February Russia declared "that there ought to be Peace with this King of Prussia; that Her Tsarish Majesty, for their own part, is resolved on the thing; gives up East Prussia and the so-called conquests made; Russian participation in such a War has ceased." Furthermore, it was agreed that Russia would help Prussia in negotiating a peace with Sweden.

Frederick II (1712–1786) was so overjoyed, that he "ordered Te Deum and fêtes (festivals)" after the signing of the Treaty on 5 May. His reason for rejoicing was well merited, "for the Tsar promised him the assistance of a token force of 18,000 men" to be used against the Austrian army. The subsequent Treaty of Hubertusburg made peace between Prussia, Austria and Saxony, but "though it restored the prewar status quo, marked the ascendancy of Prussia as a leading European power."

Two years after the treaty, Prussia and Russia would enter into a defensive alliance.

== See also ==
- List of treaties
