= Schwalm =

Schwalm may refer to

== Geography ==
- Schwalm (region), a natural region in the West Hesse Depression, Germany
- Schwalm (Eder), a tributary of the Eder in North Hesse, Germany
- Schwalm (Meuse), a tributary of the Maas between Rur, Nette and Niers in North Rhine-Westphalia, Germany; in the Netherlands known as the Swalm
- Schwalm-Eder-Kreis, a Kreis (district) in the north of Hesse, Germany

== People ==
- Béla Schwalm (born 1941), Hungarian former ice hockey player
- J. Peter Schwalm (born 1970), German composer and music producer
