= Ursula Goltz =

German computer scientist

- Died: 2024-10-30
- Education: RWTH Aachen University
- Known for: Introduction of action refinement in concurrent systems theory
- Scientific career
- Fields: Computer science
- Workplaces: Technical University of Braunschweig
- Thesis: Über die Darstellung von CCS-Programmen durch Petrinetze (1988)

Ursula Goltz was a German computer scientist, professor emerita at the Technical University of Braunschweig, formerly affiliated with the Institute for Programming and Reactive Systems there, and former coordinator of a German Research Foundation program on long-lasting software systems. Her research concerns the theory of concurrent computing, including the use of Petri nets to model concurrent systems. Goltz earned her Ph.D. at RWTH Aachen University in 1988, with the dissertation, Über die Darstellung von CCS-Programmen durch Petrinetze.

In the theory of concurrent systems, she is known for introducing the concept of action refinement, an analogue of Niklaus Wirth's concept of stepwise refinement in the development of software systems, together with Rob van Glabbeek. She is also one of the developers of Arden2ByteCode, a compiler for the Arden syntax for representing medical knowledge.

Ursula Goltz died on 30 October 2024.
