= Leopold Heinrich von der Goltz =

Prussian diplomat

Leopold Heinrich, Graf von der Goltz (19 March 1745 – 15 June 1816) was a Prussian Generalleutnant and diplomat who served as the Prussian ambassador to Russia from 1789 to 1794.

== Early life ==
Goltz was born on 19 March 1746 in Berlin. He was the son of the Prussian Generalmajor Georg Konrad von der Goltz (1704–1747) and Charlotte Wilhelmine von Grävenitz (1720–1771), niece of Wilhelmine von Grävenitz. Among his siblings were brothers Wilhelm Bernhard von der Goltz, also a Prussian diplomat, and Karl Franz von der Goltz, was a Generalleutnant and Minister of War.

== Career ==
In February 1758 Goltz was a Cavalry Ensign (German: Estandartenjunker) in the Gensdarmes Regiment. During the Seven Years' War, he was wounded in the Battle of Hochkirch. He was at the Siege of Olomouc and the Battles of Zorndorf in 1758, the Battle of Hoyerswerda in 1759, and the Battles of Liegnitz and Torgau in 1760. Goltz became a Lieutenant in June 1761 and a Staff Captain in October 1775. He fought in the War of the Bavarian Succession, became a Captain and Company Commander in January 1779, a Major in November 1786, and a Colonel and Officer of the Gensdarmes in April 1789.

Having already been sent on diplomatic missions under King Frederick II, in May 1789 he was appointed Envoy Extraordinary and Minister Plenipotentiary in St. Petersburg, where he presented his letter of credence on 22 June 1789. On 9 September 1789, he was also elevated to the Prussian nobility as a Count by King Frederick William II. On 7 February 1793 he also received the rank of Generalmajor. Much to his dismay, he was recalled from St. Petersburg by the King on 24 February 1794 and awarded the Order of the Red Eagle. He rejected the King's offer of a Dragoon Regiment, however, on 1 January 1795 he became Chief of the body Cuirassier Regiment and in May 1796 he and his regiment were assigned to the observation army in Westphalia. Goltz retired in February 1797 with a pension of 2,000 thalers annually. He received the rank of Generalleutnant on 10 January 1807.

== Personal life ==
Goltz was married to Eleonore Juliane von Maltzahn (d. 1798). Together, they were the parents of:

- Karl Friedrich Heinrich von der Goltz (1775–1822), Prussian diplomat who married Julie Wilhelmine von Seckendorff in 1807.
- Eleonore von der Goltz (1798–1861), who married Carl von Rantzau, Deputy Equerry and Court Marshal in Mecklenburg-Schwerin.

Count von der Goltz died on 15 June 1816 in Berlin. He was buried in Luisenfriedhof II in Berlin-Wilmersdorf.
