= Luisenfriedhof III =

Historic cemetery in Berlin, Germany

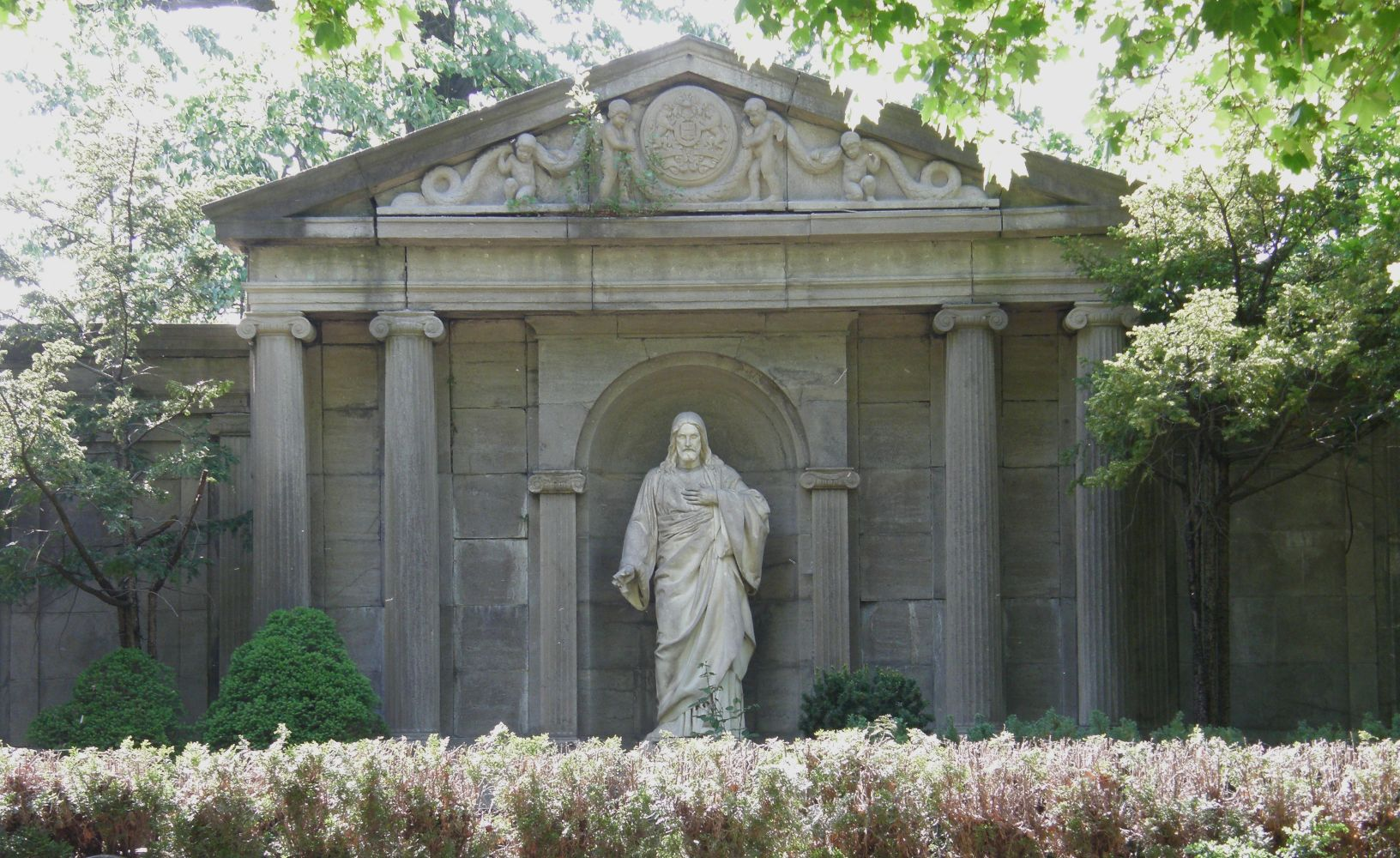
- Interactive map of Luisenfriedhof III

Details
- Established: 1891
- Location: Berlin
- Country: Germany
- Coordinates: 52°31′29″N 13°16′38″E
- Type: Protestant cemetery
- Size: 12 ha (30 acres)

The Protestant Luisenfriedhof III (German: Der evangelische Luisenfriedhof III) is a cemetery in the Westend district of Berlin. The cemetery is under monument protection.

== History ==
A church-owned and operated cemetery with a size of 12 hectares, Luisenfriedhof III was planned by Charlottenburg’s city planning officer Paul Bratring and master gardener and landscape architect Otto Vogeler beginning in 1884 and was consecrated June 19, 1891. The cemetery chapel was built 1892/93 and first used Oktober 30, 1892. The early Gothic red brick building was designed by Johannes Vollmer and Heinrich Jassoy. The steeple of the chapel was destroyed in World War II. In 1905, the cemetery expanded to its present size.

== Notable burials ==
Notables buried include:

- Georg Bleibtreu (1828–1892), painter
- Heinrich Karl Brugsch (1827–1894), Egyptologist
- Wilhelm Cauer (1900–1945), mathematician and scientist
- Heinrich Dernburg (1829–1907), jurist, professor, and politician
- Ernst Förstemann (1822–1906), historian, archivist and librarian
- Georg Heym (1887–1912), writer and poet
- Fritz Kolbe (1900–1971), diplomat and spy for the Allied forces
- Brigitte Mira (1910–2005), actress
- Karl August Möbius (1825–1908), zoologist
- John Rabe (1892-1950), merchant
- Eva Renzi (1944–2005), actress
- Rosel Zech (1942–2011), actress

== Gallery ==
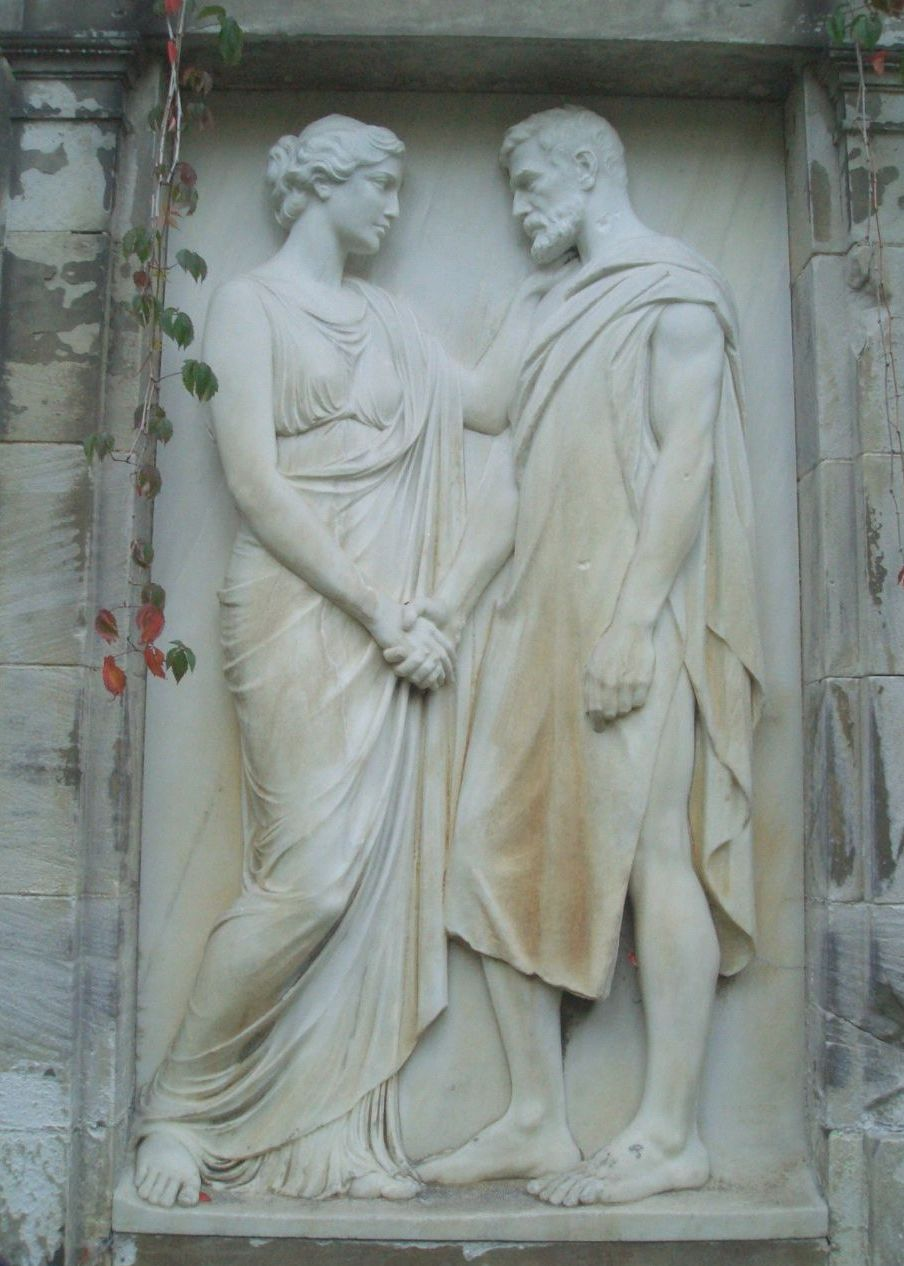

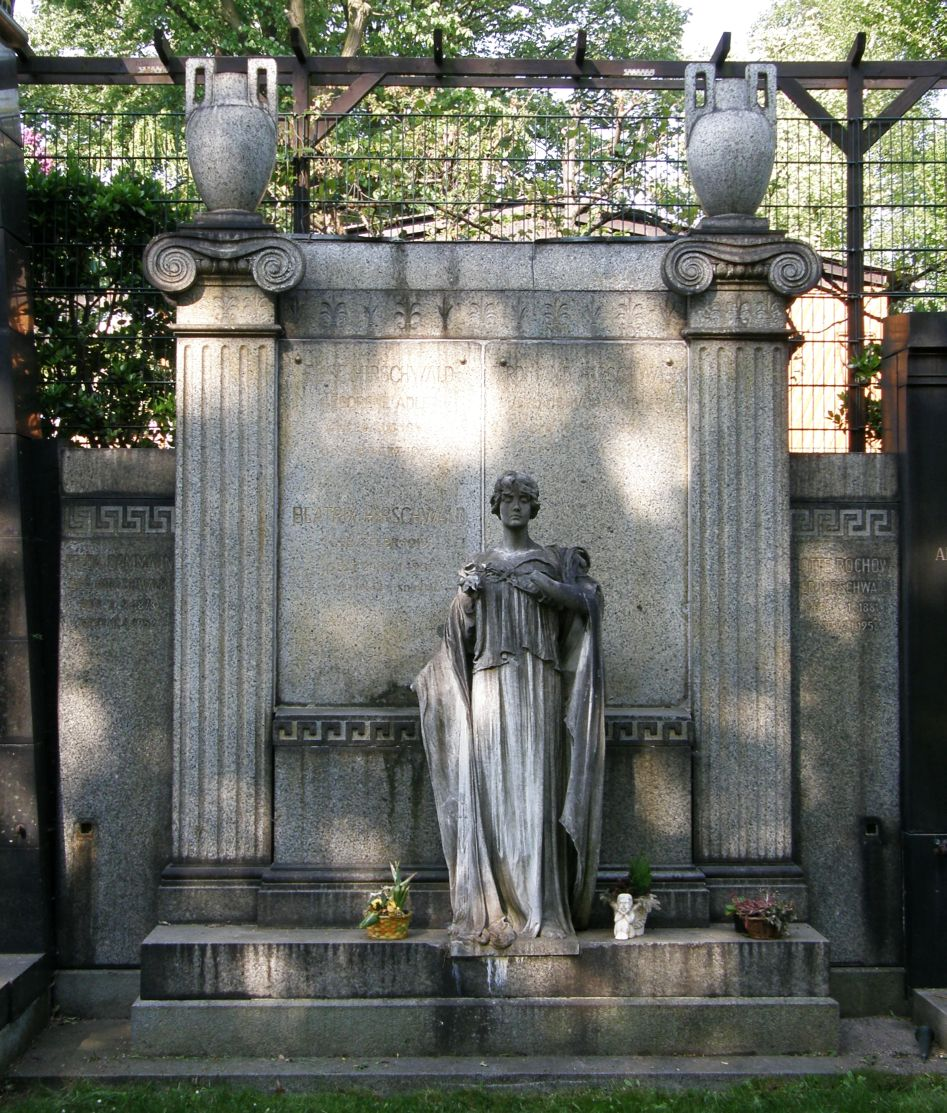

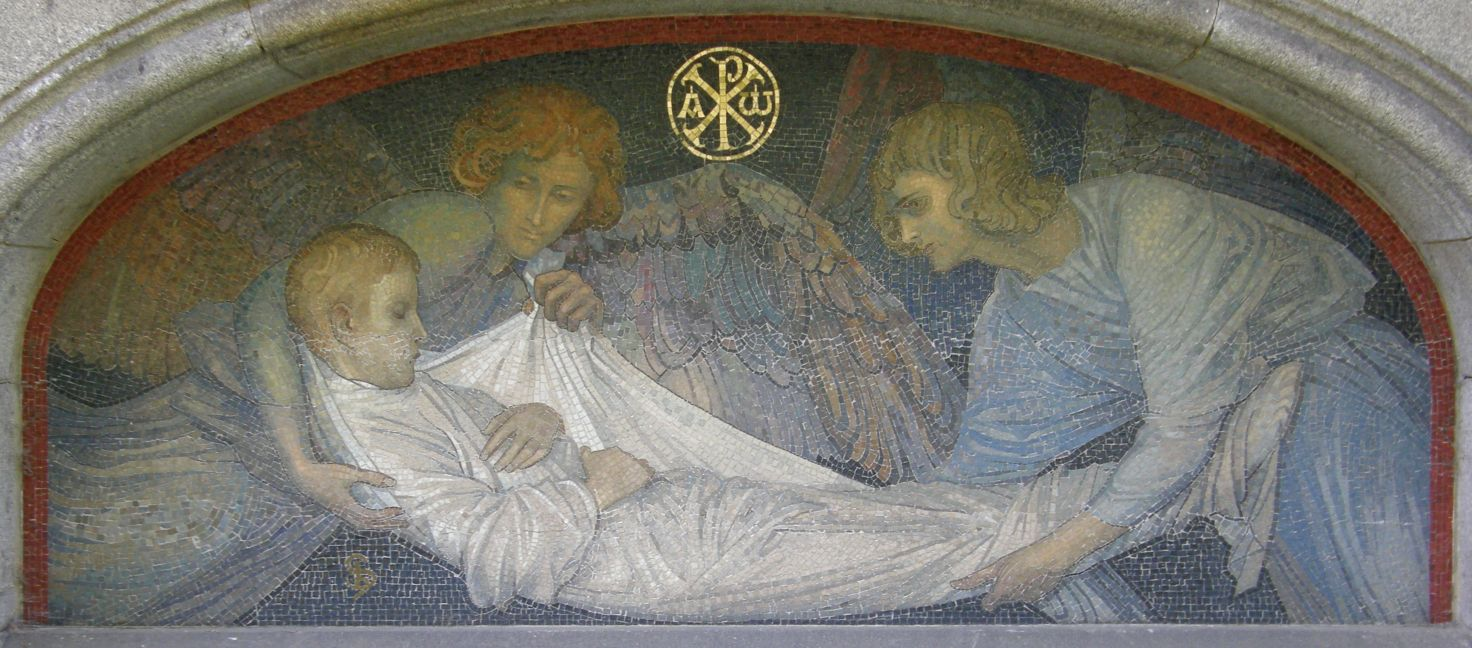

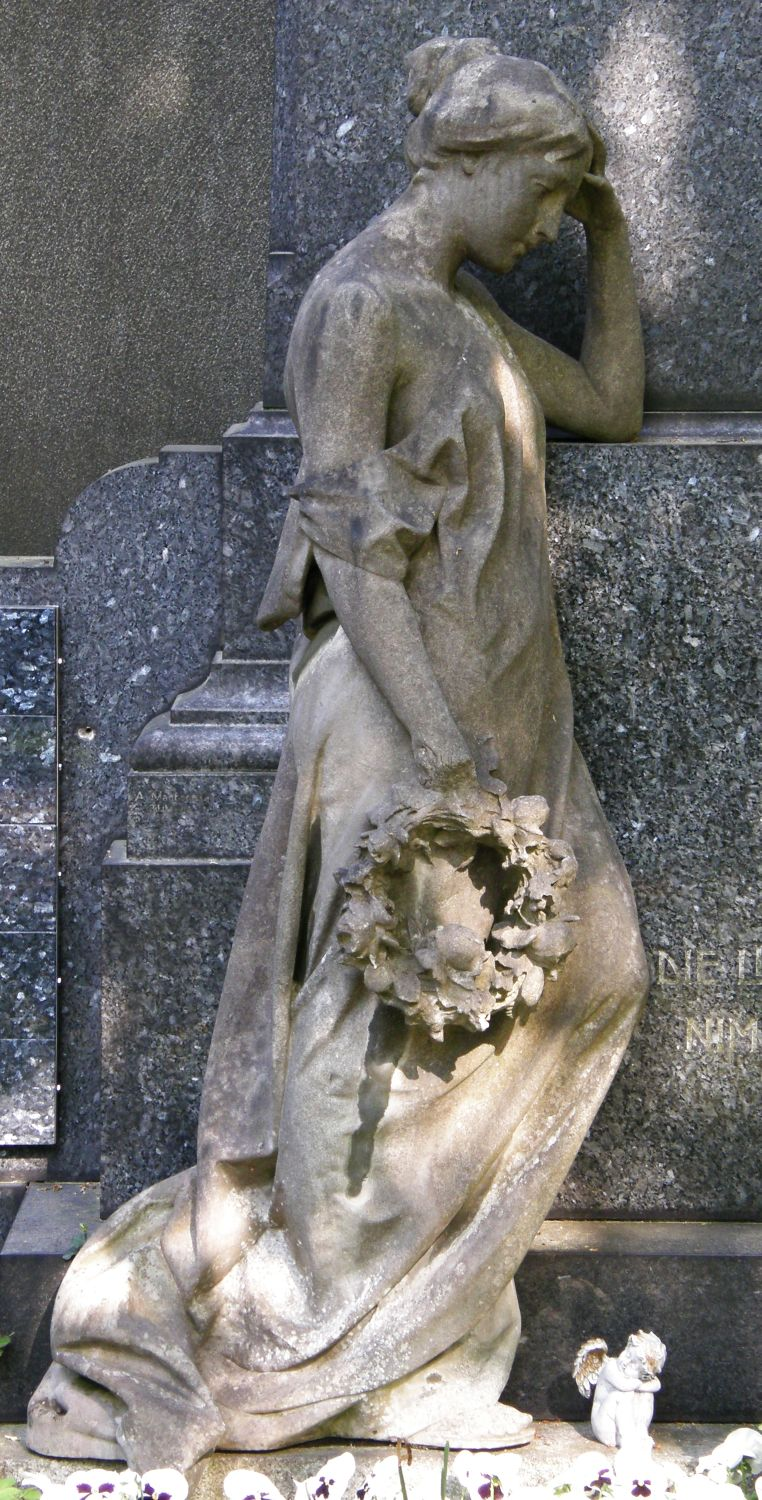

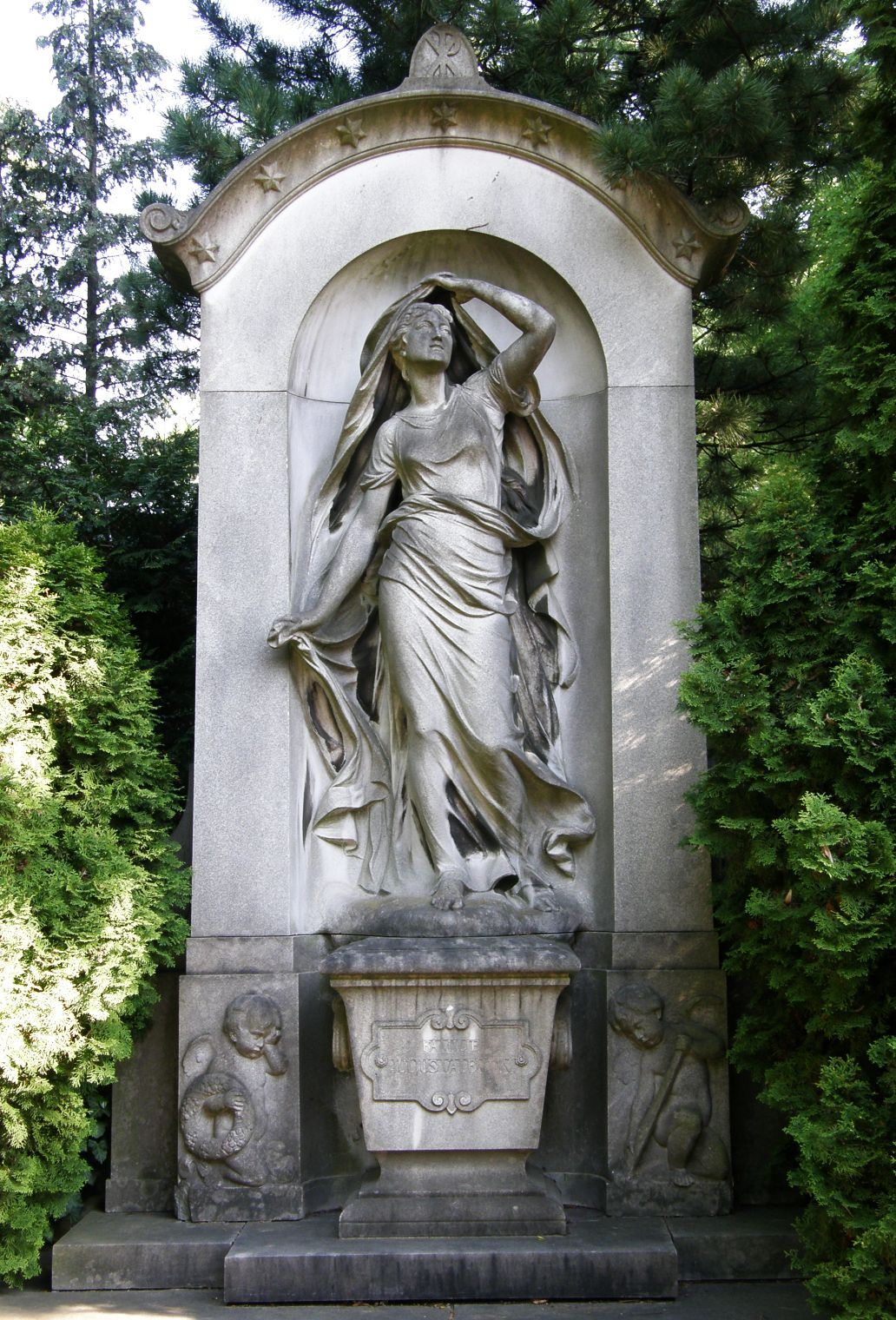

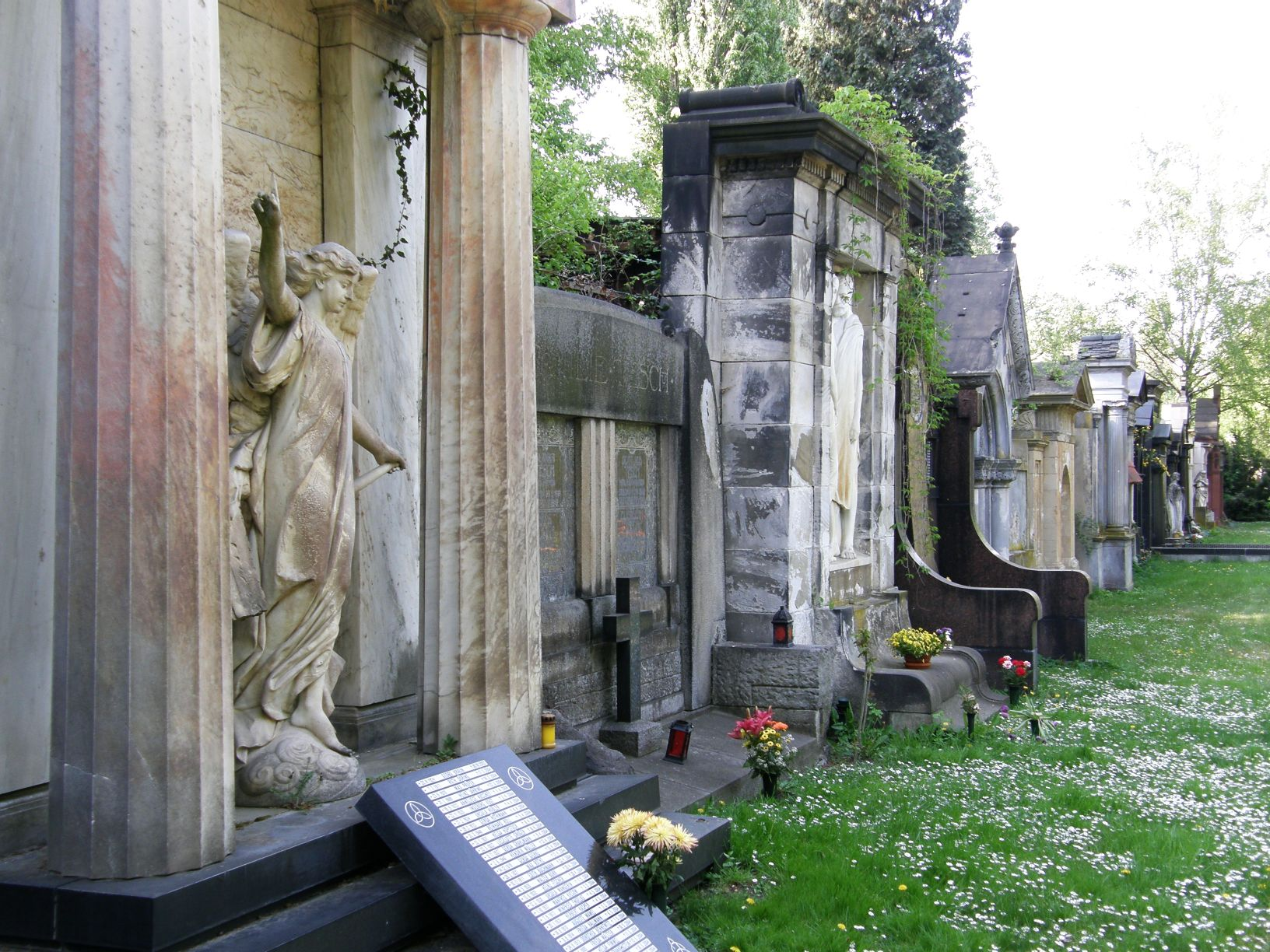

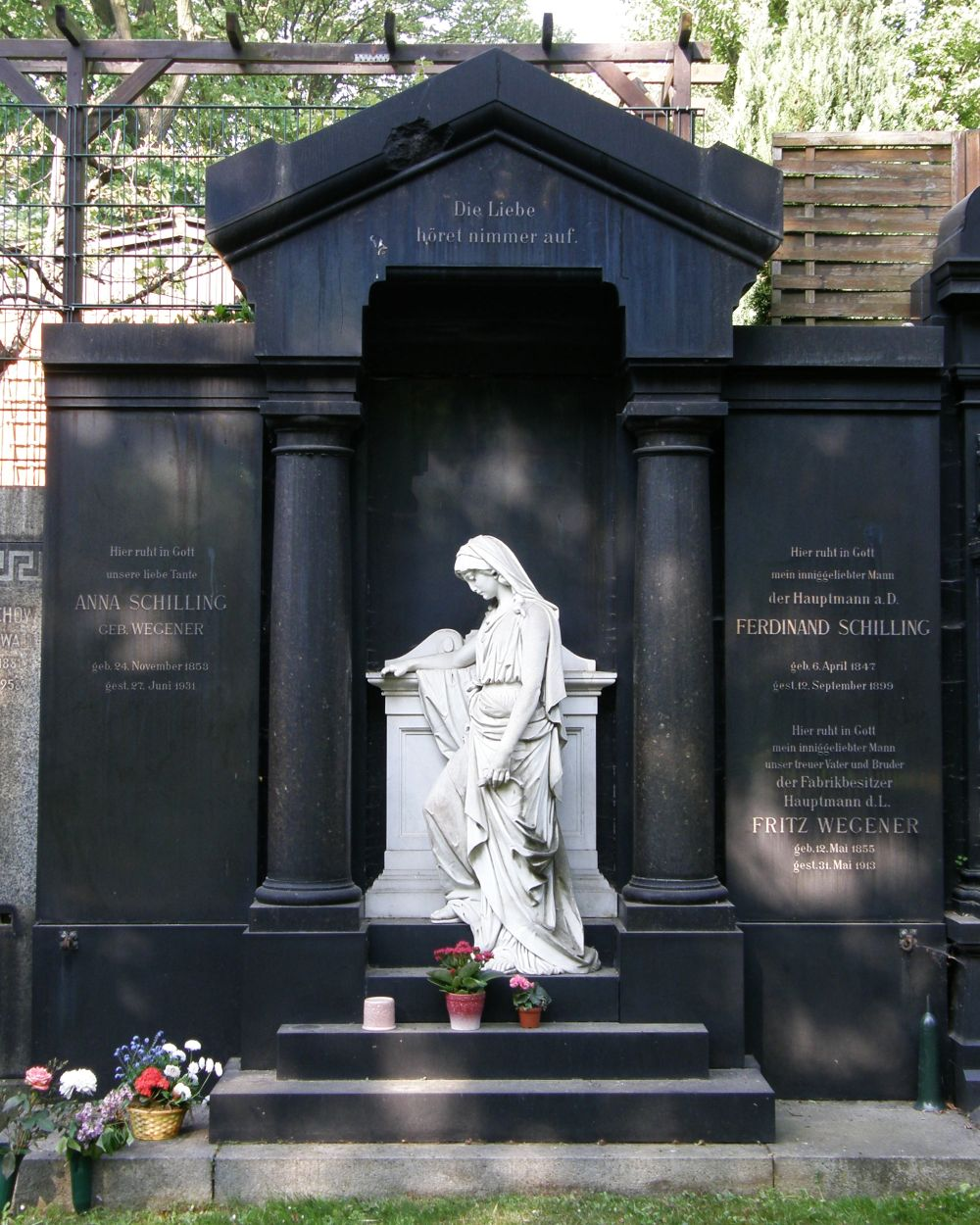

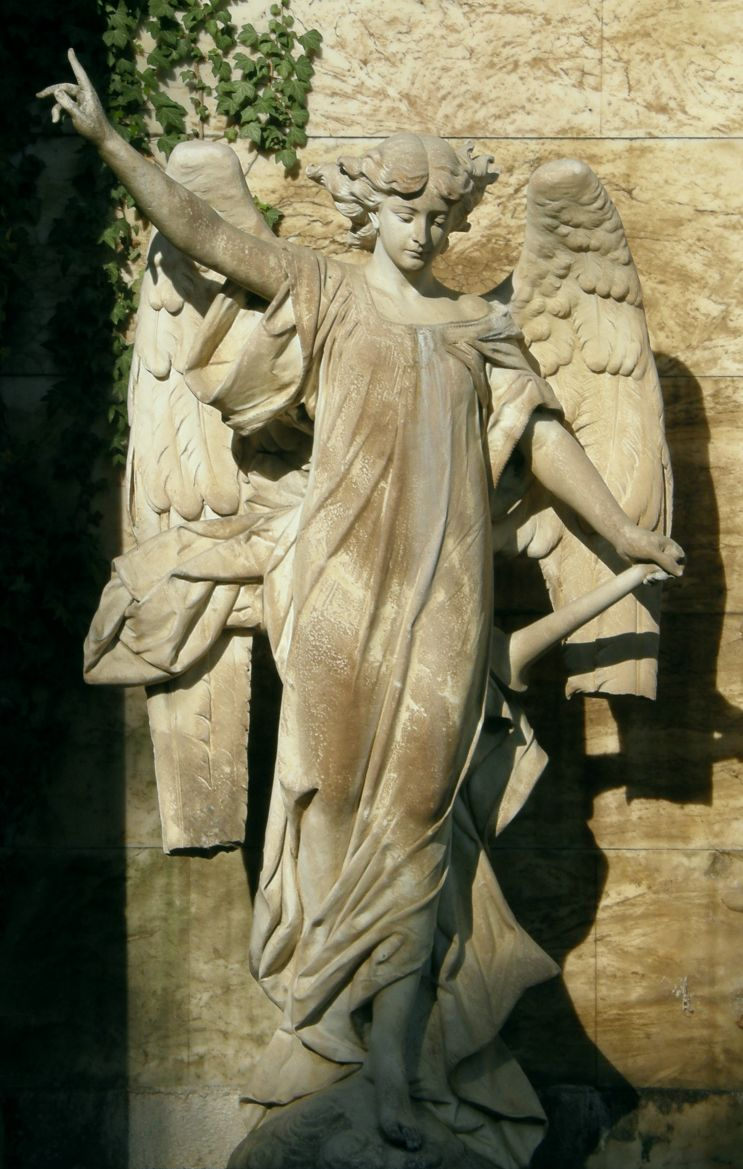

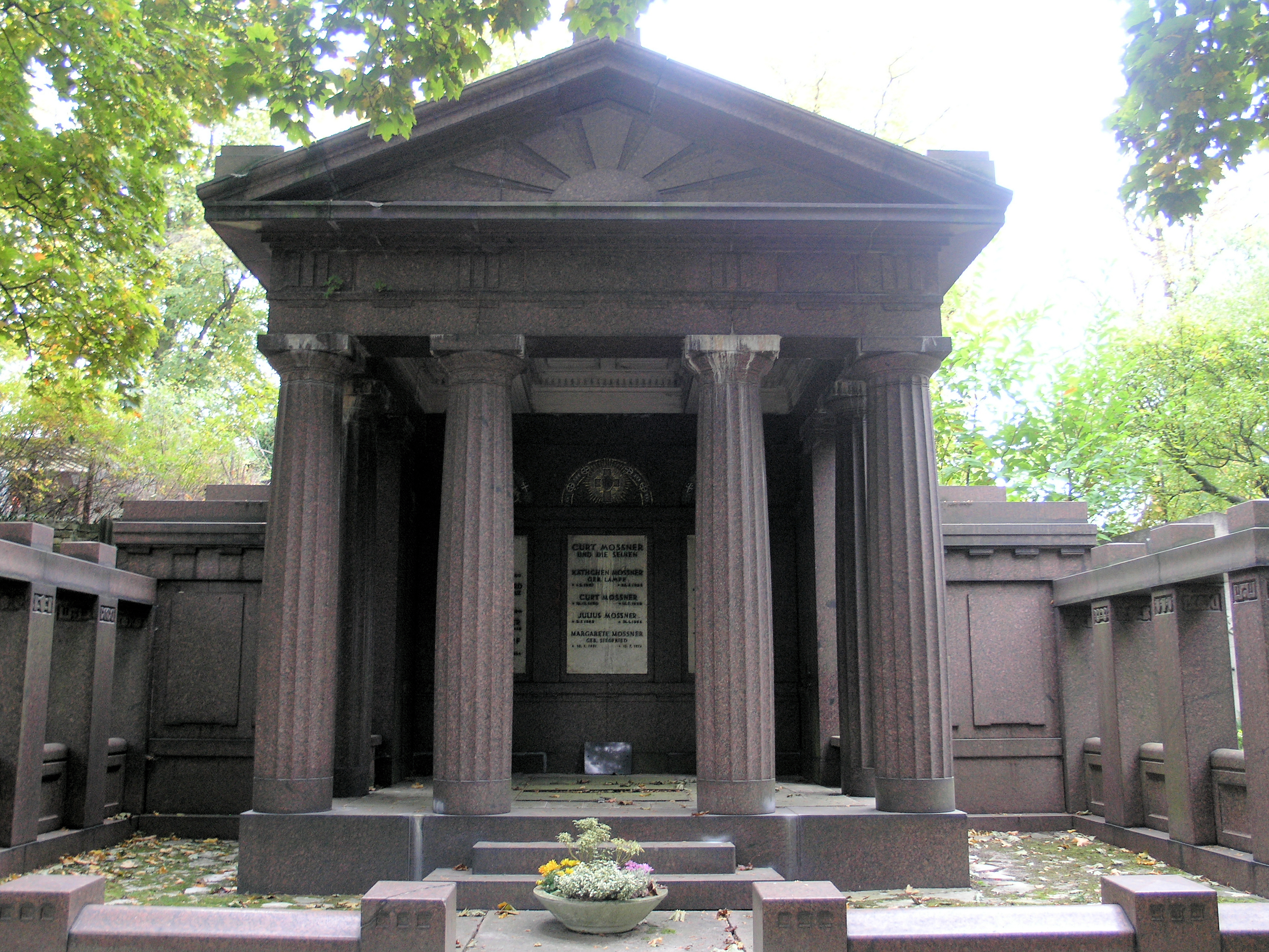

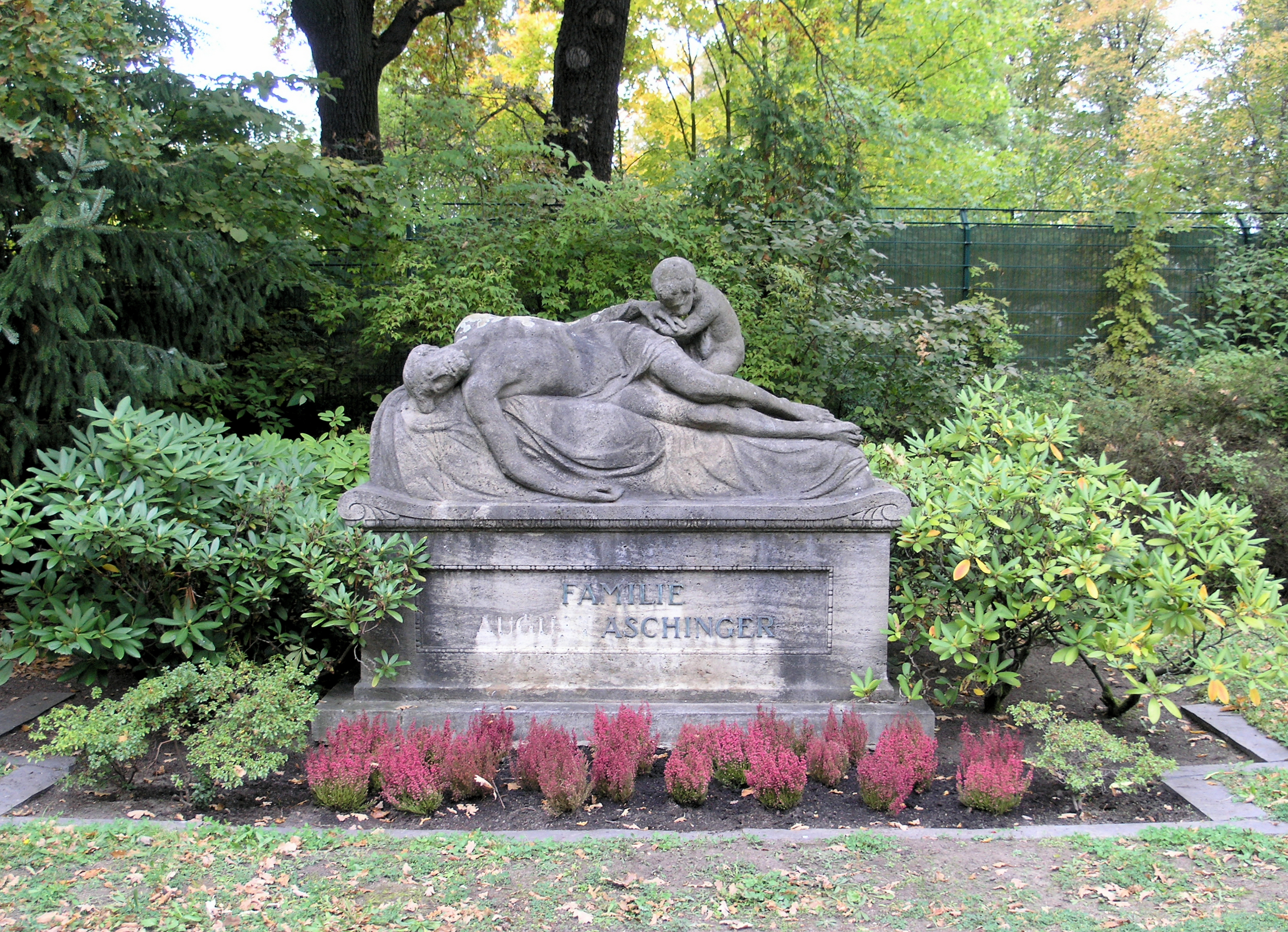
