= Heinrich Wilhelm von Werther =

Prussian diplomat and Foreign Minister

Foreign minister of Prussia
- In office 13 May 1837 – 30 August 1841
- Monarchs: Frederick William III; Frederick William IV
- Preceded by: Friedrich Ancillon
- Succeeded by: Mortimer von Maltzan

Personal details
- Born: 7 August 1772 Königsberg, Kingdom of Prussia
- Died: 7 December 1859 (aged 87) Berlin, Kingdom of Prussia
- Spouse: Josephine von Sandizell
- Children: 2, including Karl
- Parents: Philipp August Wilhelm von Werther (father); Sophie Albertine Elisabeth von Korff (mother)

Heinrich August Alexander Wilhelm von Werther (born 7 August 1772 in Königsberg; died 7 December 1859 in Berlin) was a Prussian diplomat and Foreign Minister from 1837 to 1841. His son, Karl von Werther, was also a prominent Prussian diplomat.

== Early military life ==
Werther was the son of Generalleutnant (Lieutenant General) Von Werther. He also joined the Prussian military in 1787 and participated in the War of the Fourth Coalition as a Rittmeister in the Dragoon regiment of his father, who had died in 1802. After the Treaties of Tilsit and resultant army downsizing, he left the force as a captain. For a while, he was a chamberlain to Friedrich Wilhelm III.

== Diplomatic career ==
In 1810 Werther joined the diplomatic service. Between 1809 and 1813 he was the Prussian Resident Minister in Constantinople. After that he was envoy to Spain in 1814 and in 1821 envoy and minister plenipotentiary in London. Here he was, amongst other things, significantly involved in the negotiations for the first Anglo-Prussian agreement on shipping in 1823. Then he was posted to Paris between 1824 and 1837. Particularly in the period of the July Revolution in 1830 he played an international balancing role.

Although he declined the office of Foreign Minister in 1831, he held this position from 1837 to 1841, including during the ascension of Frederick William IV. Although he had difficulties in holding his ground in domestic politics, he managed to maintain a good relationship with France, and the construction of the railway from Cologne to Antwerp was also something he promoted. In the Oriental Crisis of 1840 Werther opposed the Russian pressure for Prussia to engage herself militarily, as he was of the opinion that in a potential war, due to Austria's military weakness the main burden would fall on Prussia.

== Later life ==
After his retirement as Foreign Minister he was head of the department of Neuenburg (Neuchâtel). At the same time he belonged to the Prussian Council of State.
