= Ludwig von Wildenbruch =

- Full name: Anton Albert Heinrich Ludwig
- Born: 28 March 1803; Berlin, Kingdom of Prussia
- Died: 29 November 1874 (aged 71); Berlin, German Empire
- Noble family: House of Hohenzollern
- Spouses: Ernestine von Langen (m. 1837; died 1858) Flora Nicolovius (m. 1860; died 1874)
- Issue: Ernst von Wildenbruch
- Father: Prince Louis Ferdinand of Prussia

Anton Albert Heinrich Ludwig (or Louis) von Wildenbruch (28 March 1803 – 29 November 1874) was a Prussian general and diplomat.

== Early life ==
Wildenbruch was born in Berlin on 28 March 1803. He was an illegitimate son of Prince Louis Ferdinand of Prussia by Henriette Fromme.

== Career ==
He served as consul general in Beirut in the mid-19th century. He was also the Prussian ambassador to Constantinople from 1852 to 1859 at the time of the Crimean War. An amateur scientist, his reports were published in various learned journals of the time.

Between 1842 and 1846, Wildenbruch surveyed the mountainous Galilee region while he was posted to the country. He also measured the water levels of Red Sea along with Sea of Galilee.

== Personal life ==
In 1837 he married Ernestine von Langen (1805–1858), by whom he had four children who lived to adulthood. Two years after his first wife's death he wed Flora Nicolovius (1811–1879). A son of Wildenbruch's first marriage was the poet and dramatist Ernst von Wildenbruch.
