= List of ambassadors of Germany to France =

Ambassador of Germany to France
- Deutscher Botschafter in Frankreich

- Incumbent; Stephan Steinlein since August 7, 2023
- Style: Ambassador extraordinary and plenipotentiary
- Residence: Paris
- Inaugural holder: Harry von Arnim
- Formation: 1871

This is an incomplete list of ambassadors from Germany to France.

== Diplomatic missions ==
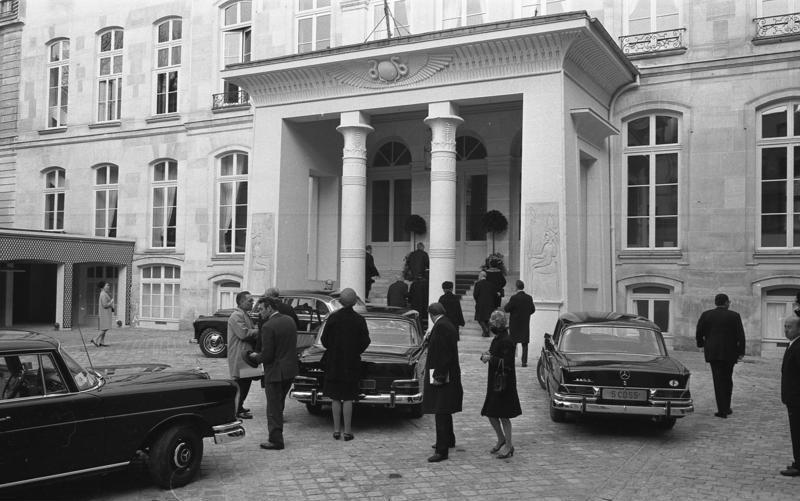
Initiation of the West German Embassy at the Hôtel Beauharnais in Paris, 1968

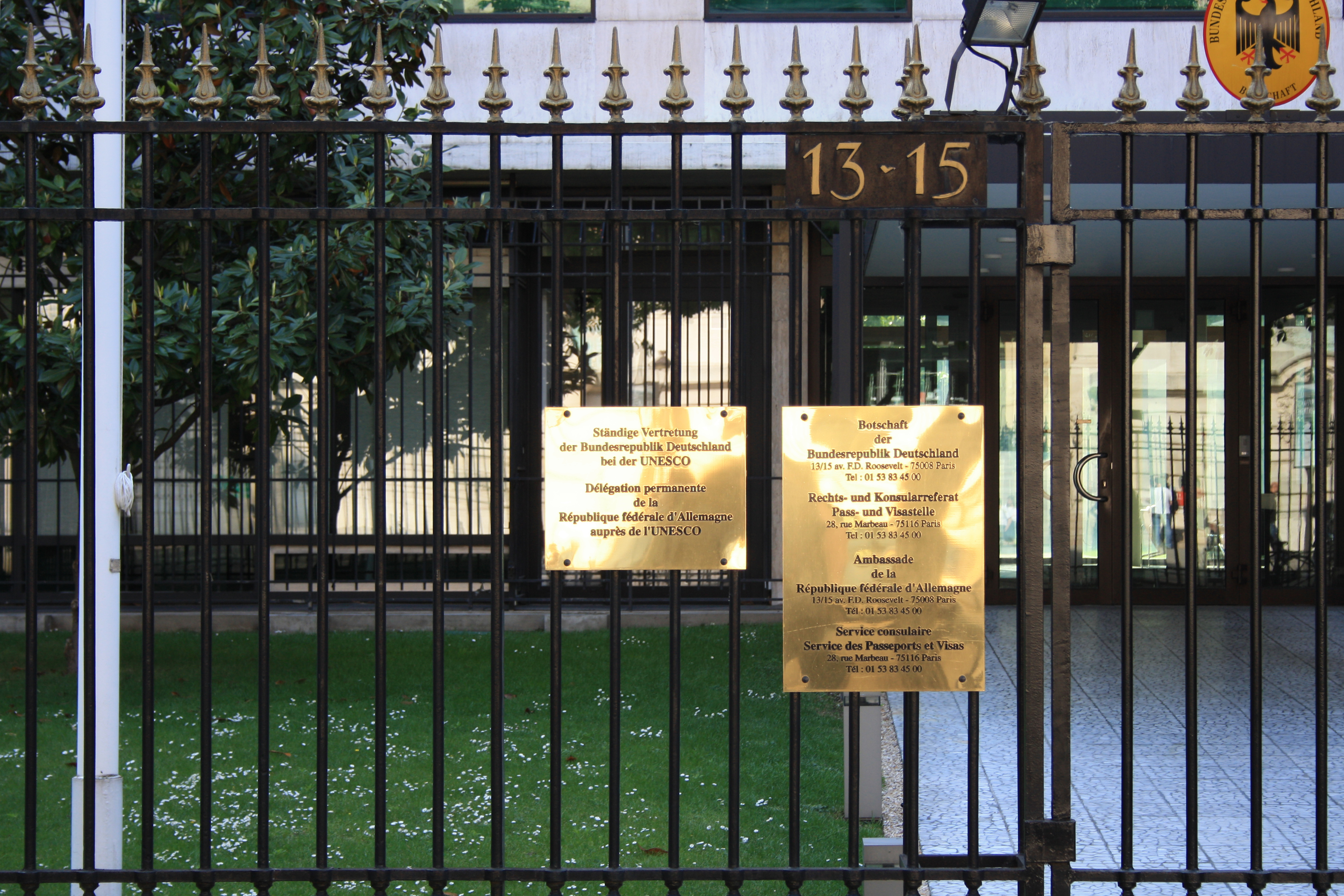
The German Embassy in Paris

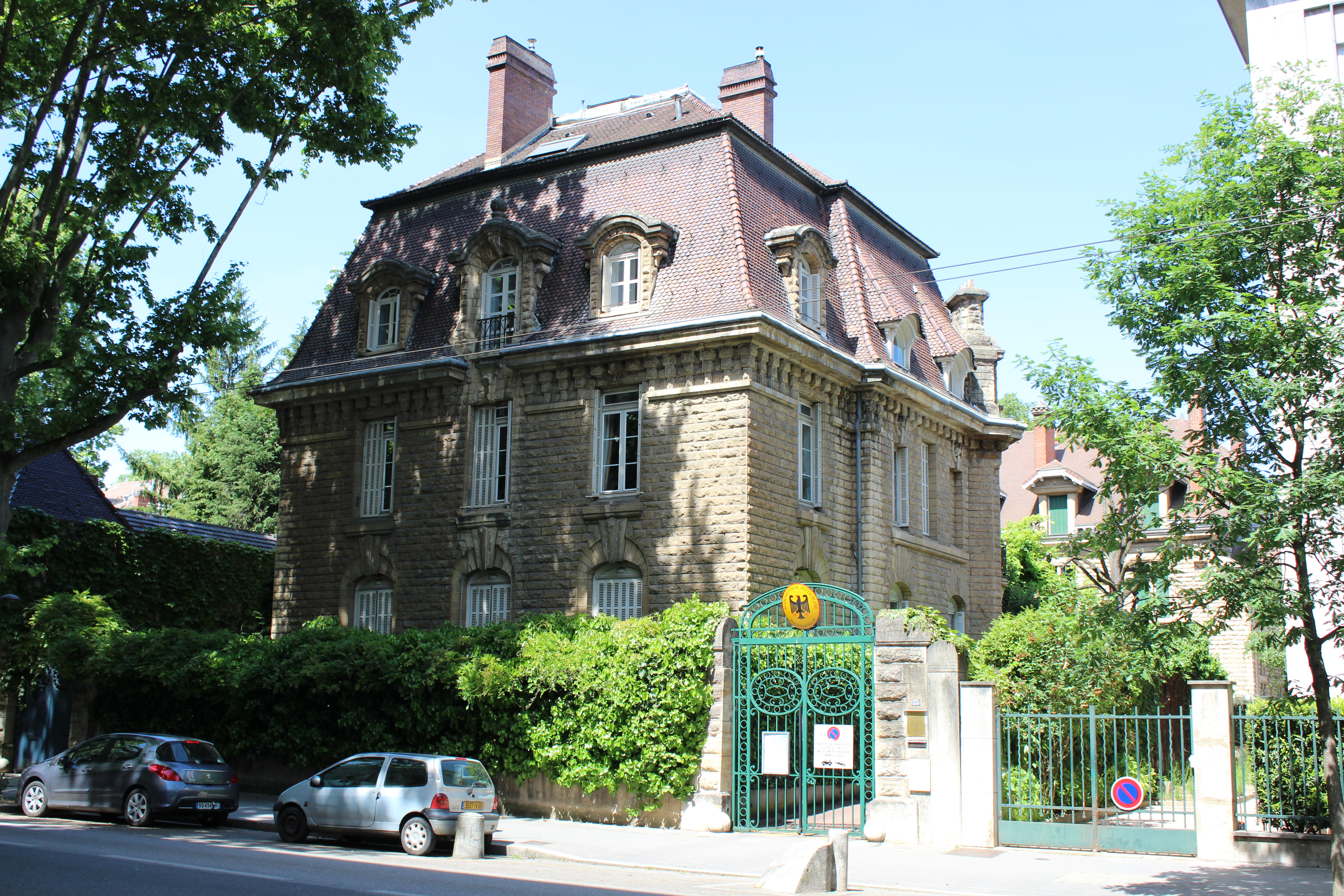
The German Consulate-General in Lyon

In 1874, the Embassy in Paris was one of only four Germany embassies alongside London, Saint Petersburg, and Vienna, Today, of 226 diplomatic missions abroad, Germany has five diplomatic and consular missions in France. The German Embassy is in Paris. In 1961, France returned the Hôtel de Beauharnais, the former German embassy in Paris which had been expropriated by France at the end of World War II, as a gesture of solidarity between the two nations. Additionally, there are four consulates-general in Bordeaux, Lyon, Marseille and Strasbourg.

The Hôtel de Beauharnais in the 7th arrondissement of Paris serves as the official residence of the German Ambassador to France.

== Ambassadors ==
=== Ambassadors of the German Empire ===
- 1871–1873: Harry von Arnim
- 1874–1885: Chlodwig, Prince of Hohenlohe-Schillingsfürst
- 1885–1900: Georg Herbert Münster
- 1900–1910: Hugo von Radolin
- 1910–1914: Wilhelm von Schoen

=== Ambassadors of the Weimar Republic ===
- 1920–1923: Wilhelm Mayer
- 1924–1932: Leopold von Hoesch

=== Ambassadors of Nazi Germany ===
- 1933–1935: Roland Köster
- 1936–1939: Johannes von Welczeck
- 1940–1944: Otto Abetz

=== Ambassadors of the German Democratic Republic ===
- 1956–1962: Herbert Merkel
- 1962–1962: Herbert Schulze
- 1963–1967: Willi Diebenkorn
- 1967–1973: Gerhard Schramm
- 1973–1974: Gerhard Schramm
- 1974–1976: Ernst Scholz
- 1976–1984: Werner Fleck
- 1984–1990: Alfred Marter
- 1990: Stephan Steinlein

=== Ambassadors of the Federal Republic of Germany ===
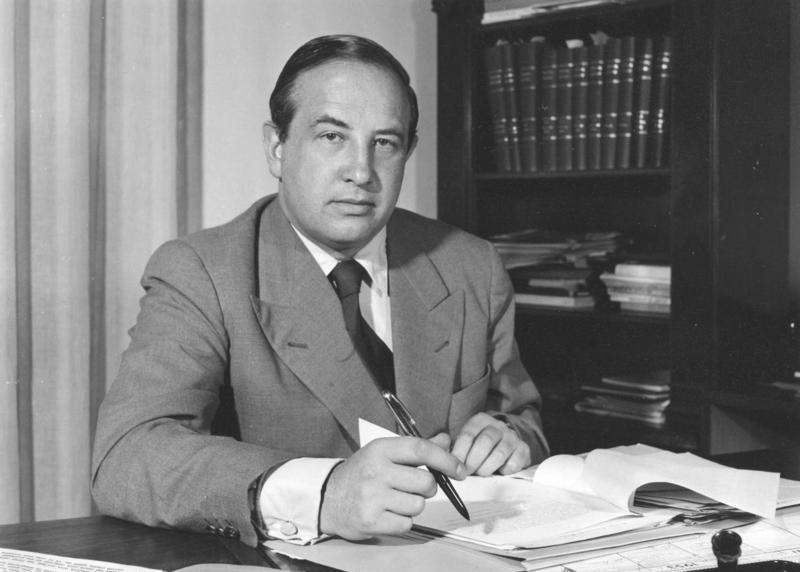
Herbert Blankenhorn

==== West Germany ====
- 1950–1955: Wilhelm Hausenstein
- 1955–1958: Vollrath von Maltzan
- 1963–1965: Herbert Blankenhorn
- 1965–1968: Manfred Klaiber
- 1968–1970: Sigismund von Braun
- 1970–1972: Hans Hellmuth Ruete
- 1972–1976: Sigismund von Braun
- 1976–1983: Axel Herbst
- 1983–1987: Franz Jochen Schoeller
- 1987–1991: Franz Pfeffer

==== Post-German reunification ====
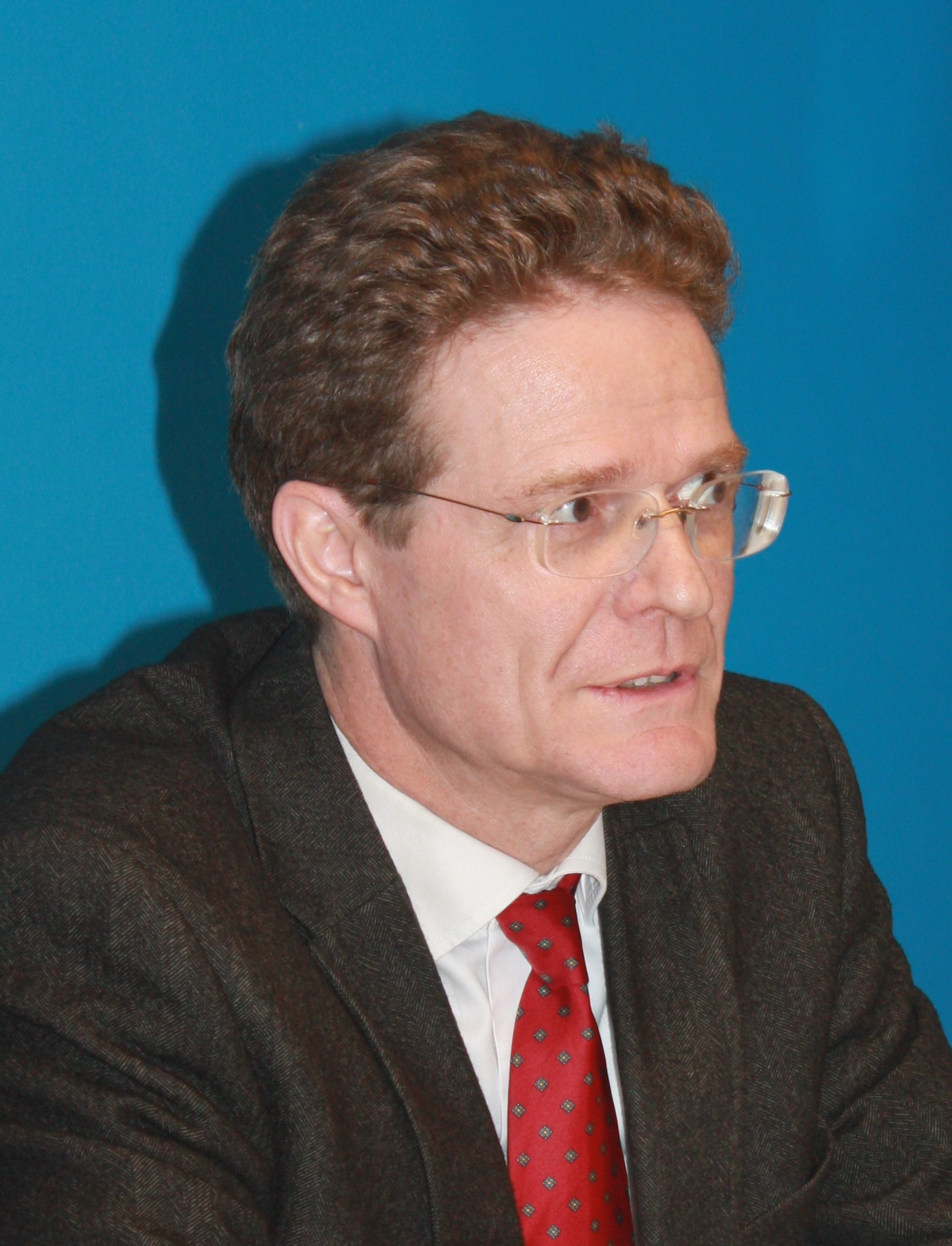
Nikolaus Meyer-Landrut, Ambassador from 2015 to 2020.

- 1991–1995: Jürgen Sudhoff
- 1995–1998: Immo Stabreit
- 1998–2000: Peter Hartmann
- 2000–2004: Fritjof von Nordenskjöld
- 2004–2007: Klaus Neubert
- 2007–2008: Peter Ammon
- 2008–2012: Reinhard Schäfers
- 2012–2015: Susanne Wasum-Rainer
- 2015–2020: Nikolaus Meyer-Landrut
- 2020–2023: Hans-Dieter Lucas
- 2023–now: Stephan Steinlein

== Envoys from the German States (before 1871) ==
=== Baden envoys ===
- 1791: Establishment of diplomatic relations
- 1713–1734: Johann Rudolf Fäsch
- 1761–1762: Ulrich von Thun
- 1772–1781: Pierre Samuel du Pont de Nemours
- 1781–1782: Giorgio di Santi
- 1783–1789: Pierre Samuel du Pont de Nemours
- 1789–1803:
- 1803–1809: Emmerich Joseph von Dalberg
- 1810–1831: Johann Baptist von Pfirdt
- 1831–1843: Christian Friedrich Gerstlacher
- 1843–1846: Franz Xaver von Andlaw-Birseck
- 1846–1871: Ferdinand Allesina von Schweitzer

=== Bavarian envoys ===
==== Envoys from the Electorate of Bavaria ====
- 1666: Establishment of diplomatic relations
- 1733–1736: Louis Joseph d’Albert de Luynes von Grimbergen
- 1737–1741: Ignaz von Törring
- 1741–1742: Louis Joseph d’Albert de Luynes von Grimbergen
- 1742–1743: von Spon
- 1743–1745: Joseph Piosasque de Non
- 1745–1747: Louis Joseph d’Albert de Luynes von Grimbergen
- 1747–1755:
- 1755–1777: Maximilian von Eyck
- 1778–1787: Karl Heinrich Joseph von Sickingen
- 1787–1799: Vacant
- 1799–1805: Anton von Cetto

==== Envoys of the Kingdom of Bavaria ====
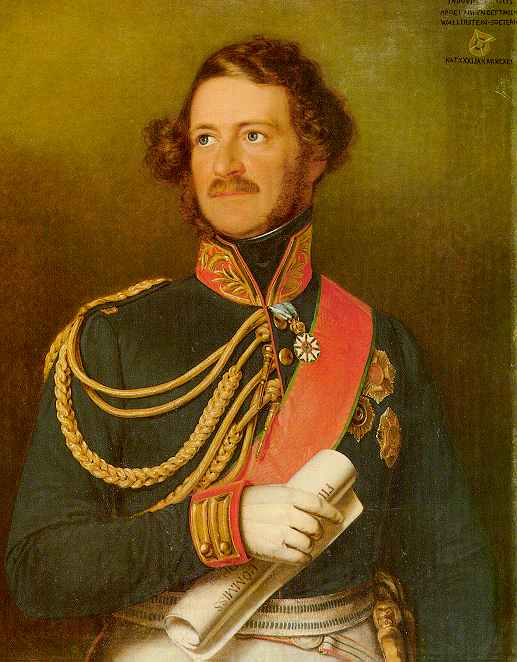
Ludwig, Prince of Oettingen-Wallerstein

- 1806–1813: Anton von Cetto
- 1813-1817: No relations
- 1817–1821: Wilibald von Rechberg and Rothenlöwen
- 1821-1823: Vacant
- 1823–1827: Franz Gabriel von Bray-Steinburg
- 1827–1834: Christian Hubert von Pfeffel
- 1835–1839: Franz Oliver von Jenison-Walworth
- 1840–1846: Friedrich von Luxburg
- 1846–1847: Ludwig von Oettingen-Wallerstein
- 1847-1850: Vacant
- 1850–1866: August von Wendland
- 1866–1868: Maximilian Joseph Pergler von Perglas
- 1868–1871: Friedrich von Quadt-Wykradt-Isny
- 1871–1877: Gideon von Rudhart
- 1877–1889: Johann von Reither
- 1889–1896: Heinrich Tucher von Simmelsdorf
- 1896–1903: Rudolph von und zu der Tann-Rathsamhausen
- 1903–1903: Georg von und zu Guttenberg
- 1903–1906: Karl Moy de Sons
- 1906–1909: Friedrich von Ortenburg
- 1909–1914: Lothar von Ritter zu Groenesteyn
- 1914: End of diplomatic relations

=== Hanseatic envoys ===
- 1689–1717: Christophle Brosseau
- 1717–1727: Jacques de Cagny
- 1727–1729: Antoine Poille
- 1730–1776: Luc Courchetet d’Esnans
- 1776–1785: Louis d’Hugie
- 1785–1786: Jean Diodati
- 1786–1793: Michel-Alexis Fauvet de La Flotte
- 1795–1803: Friedrich Joachim Schlüter
- 1803–1810: Konrad Christoph Abel
- 1810–1814: No relations while the Hanseatic cities belonged to the Holy Roman Empire.
- 1814–1823: Konrad Christoph Abel
- 1824–1864: Vincent Rumpff
- 1864–1870: Hermann von Heeren

=== Prussian envoys ===
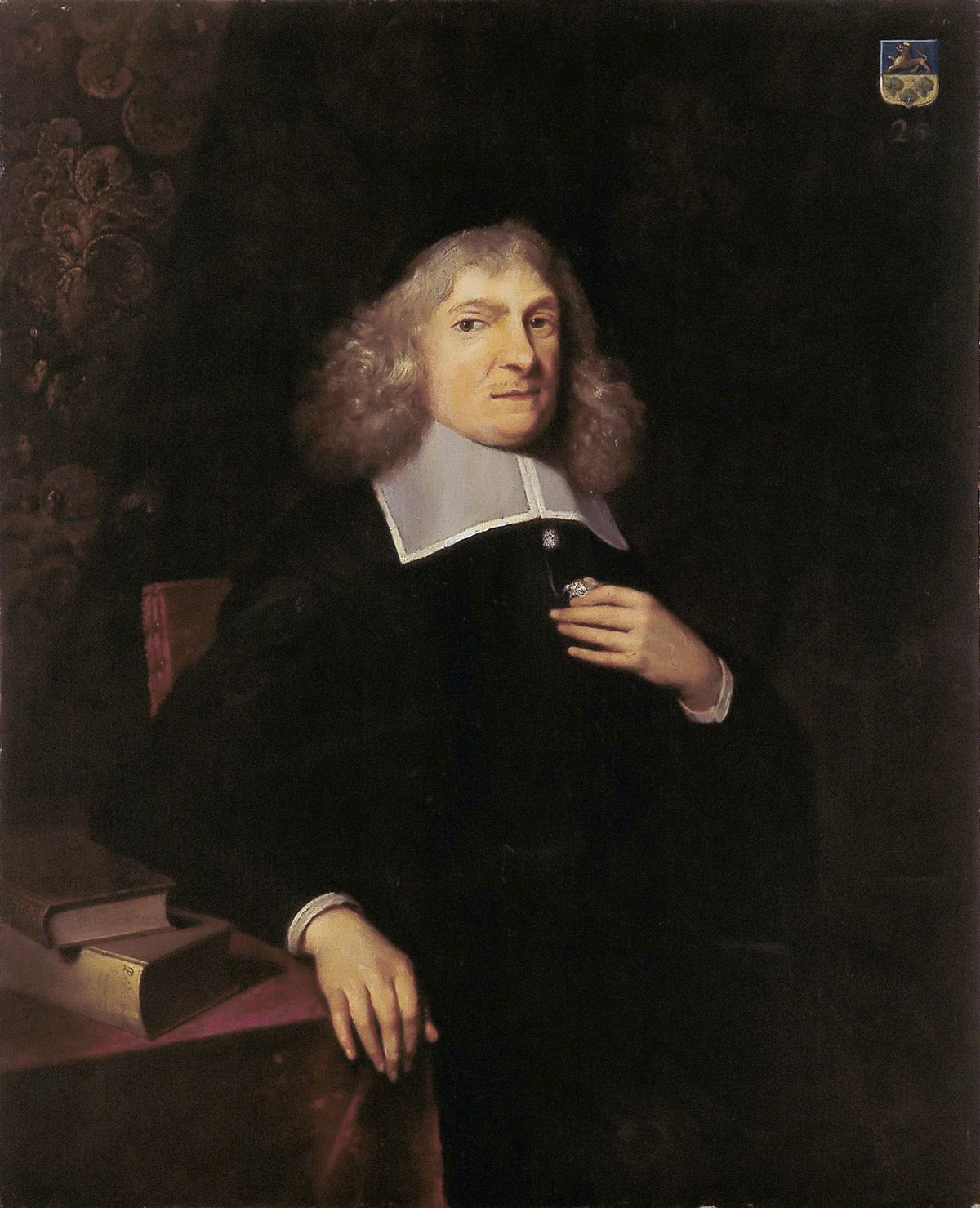
Abraham de Wicquefort

==== Envoys from the Elector of Brandenburg ====
- 1648: Establishment of diplomatic relations
- 1626–1649: Abraham de Wicquefort
- 1658: Christoph von Brandt

==== Ambassadors of the King of Prussia ====
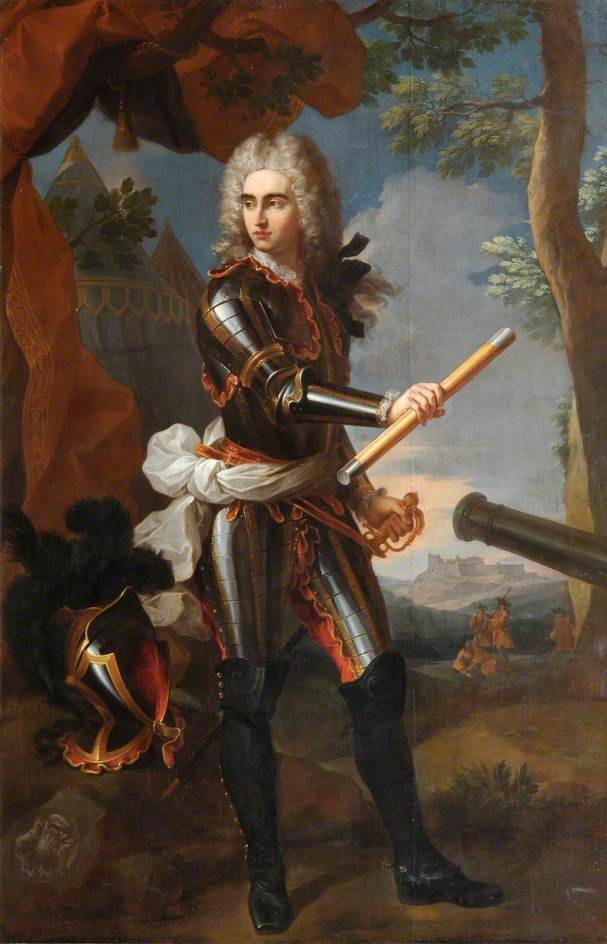
George Keith, 10th Earl Marischal

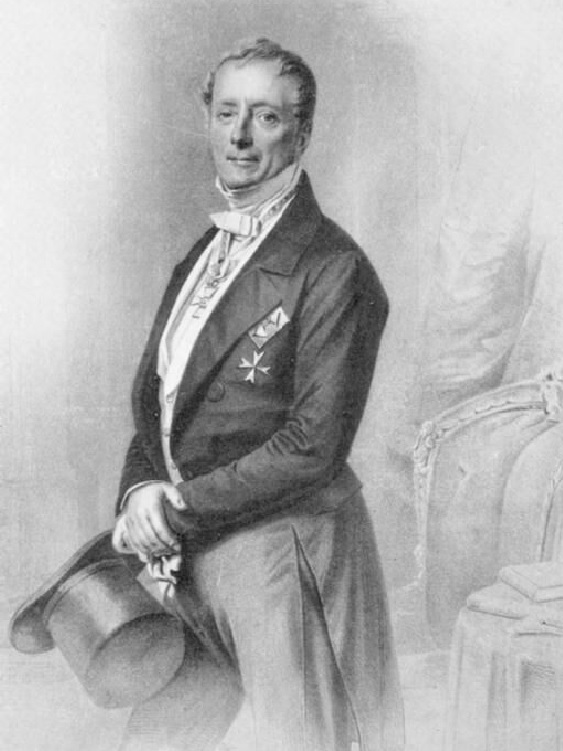
Albert von Pourtalès

- 1716–1717: Adam Otto von Viereck
- 1717–1719: Friedrich Ernst zu Innhausen und Knyphausen
- 1721–1751: Jean de Chambrier
- 1751–1754: George Keith
- 1754–1756: Dodo Heinrich zu Innhausen und Knyphausen
- 1756–1763: None due to the Seven Years' War
- 1768–1792: Wilhelm Bernhard von der Goltz
- 1792: Break in relations due to French Revolutionary Wars
- 1815–1822: Karl von der Goltz
- 1824–1837: Heinrich von Werther
- 1841–1845: Heinrich Friedrich von Arnim
- 1846–1848: Heinrich Alexander von Arnim
- 1849–1859: Maximilian von Hatzfeldt-Trachenberg
- 1859–1861: Albert von Pourtalès
- 1862–1862: Otto von Bismarck
- 1862–1868: Robert Heinrich Ludwig von der Goltz

==== Ambassadors of the North German Confederation ====
- 1868–1869: Robert von der Goltz
- 1869–1870: Karl von Werther

=== Saxon envoys ===
==== Envoys from the Electorate of Saxony ====
- 1664: Establishment of diplomatic relations
- 1709–1720: Burchard von Suhm
- 1720–1729: Carl Heinrich von Hoym
- 1729–1734: Samuel de Brais
- 1735–1737: Vacant
- 1737–1741: Samuel de Brais
- 1741–1753: Johann Adolph von Loß
- 1753–1754: Samuel Gottfried Spinnhirn
- 1754–1755: Claude Marie Noyel Bellegarde d'Entremont
- 1755–1757: Ludwig Siegfried Vitzthum von Eckstädt
- 1757–1768: Kaspar Franz von Fontenay
- 1768–1770:
- 1770–1772: Johann Georg Heinrich von Werthern

==== Envoys from the Kingdom of Saxony ====
- 1815–1827: Carl Emil von Üchtritz
- 1827–1828: Georg Rudolf von Gersdorff
- 1828–1849: Hans Heinrich von Könneritz
- 1850–1852: Karl Adolf von Hohenthal-Knauthain
- 1853–1870: Albin Leo von Seebach
- 1870–1871: Vacant

=== Württemberg envoys ===
- 1650: Establishment of diplomatic relations
- 1814–1815: Ferdinand Ludwig von Zeppelin
- 1815–1817: R. von Schwarz
- 1817–1820: Peter von Gallatin
- 1821–1838: Bernhard von Mülinen
- 1838–1849: Christian Wilhelm August von Fleischmann
- 1849–1850: Vacant
- 1850–1871: August von Wächter
- 1871: Dissolution of legation

== See also ==
- France–Germany relations
- Lists of ambassadors of Germany
