= Wendland (disambiguation) =

Wendland is a region in Germany on the borders of the present states of Brandenburg, Mecklenburg-Western Pomerania, Lower Saxony and Saxony-Anhalt.

Wendland may also refer to:

== Places ==
- in a medieval sense, the Wendland means any West Slavic, or Wendish, region not designated as Polish, Bohemian or Moravian
  - in the Middle Ages, Pomerania and the surrounding areas were called Wendland, Vendland, Vindland, Ventheland or Latin: Vandalia
  - Hanoverian Wendland is the heart of the Wendland region, today covered by the county of Lüchow-Dannenberg in the German state of Lower Saxony
  - Free Republic of Wendland was a protest camp established in Gorleben in the Wendland region of Germany in 1980
- according to the Finnish historian Matti Klinge, an earlier name for Finland
- Mount Wendland, Antarctic mountain

== Other uses ==
- Wendland (surname)
- Wendland v. Wendland
