= Wendland (surname) =

Wendland is a surname. Notable people with the surname include:

- August von Wendland (1806–1884), diplomat from the Kingdom of Bavaria
- Heinrich Wendland (1791–1869), German botanist (H.L.Wendl.)
- Hermann Wendland (1825–1903), German botanist (H.Wendl.)
- Johann Christoph Wendland (1755–1828), German botanist (Wendl.)
- Paul Wendland (1864–1915), German philologist
- Ray Wendland (1911–1986), Ph.D., American petrochemist and educator
- Robert Wendland, subject of Wendland v. Wendland an American court case concerning right to life vs. right to die
- Scott Wendland (born 1965), American figure skater
- Wolfgang Wendland (born 1962), German musician, actor, film producer and politician
- Marcelle von Wendland (born 1970), British entrepreneur, executive and author
