= Louis Joseph d'Albert, 3rd Prince of Grimberghen =

French nobleman

Louis Joseph d'Albert
- 3rd Prince of Grimberghen
- Full name: Louis Joseph d'Albert
- Born: 1 April 1672; Paris, France
- Died: 8 November 1758 (aged 86) e Hôtel du Lude , Paris, France
- Noble family: House of Albert
- Spouse: Madeleine Marie de Berghes (died 1744)
- Issue: Thérèse Pelagie d’Albert, Princess of Grimberghe
- Father: Louis Charles d'Albert de Luynes
- Mother: Anne de Rohan

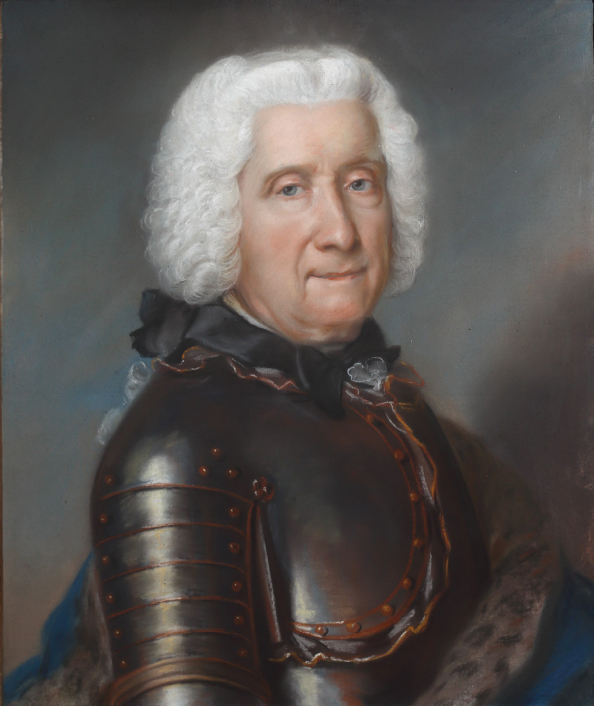
painting of Louis-Joseph d’Albert de Luynes, prince de Grimberghen by Jean Chevalier

Louis Joseph d'Albert, 3rd Prince of Grimberghen (1 April 1672 – 8 November 1758) was a French nobleman who was in the service of the Emperor Charles VII, and became field-marshal and Ambassador in France.

== Early life ==
Louis Joseph d'Albert de Luynes was born 1 April 1672 in Paris. He was a younger son and the ninth child of Louis Charles d'Albert, 2nd Duke of Luynes from the Duke's second marriage to Anne de Rohan. His siblings included Marie Anne d'Albert de Luynes (wife of their second cousin, Charles III, Prince of Guéméné), Marie Charlotte Victoire d'Albert de Luynes (wife of Alexandre Albert François Bathélemy, 4th Duke and 2nd Prince of Bournonville), Catherine Angélique d'Albert de Luynes (wife of Charles Antoine II Gouffier, Marquis of Heilly), and Jeanne Baptiste d'Albert de Luynes (the wife of Giuseppe Ignazio Scaglia, Conte di Verua and mistress of King Victor Amadeus II of Sardinia). His younger brother was Charles-Hercule d'Albert de Luynes, Duke of Chevreuse. From his father's first marriage to Louise Marie Séguier, Marquise of O, his much older half-brother was Charles Honoré d'Albert, 3rd Duke of Luynes.

His paternal grandparents were Charles d'Albert, 1st Duke of Luynes, a favourite of Louis XIII, and Princess Marie Aimée de Rohan, Mademoiselle de Montbazon. After his grandfather's death, his grandmother remarried to Claude de Lorraine, Duke of Chevreuse. After Claude's death in 1655, the Chevreuse peerage became extinct after which his grandmother bought the duchy which his father and younger brother Charles-Hercule d'Albert de Luynes inherited. His maternal grandparents were Hercule, Duke of Montbazon and the former Marie de Bretagne d'Avaugour (daughter of Claude de Bretagne, Count of Vertus). His grandfather Hercule was riding in the carriage with Henri IV on 14 May 1610 when the king was assassinated by François Ravaillac.

== Career ==
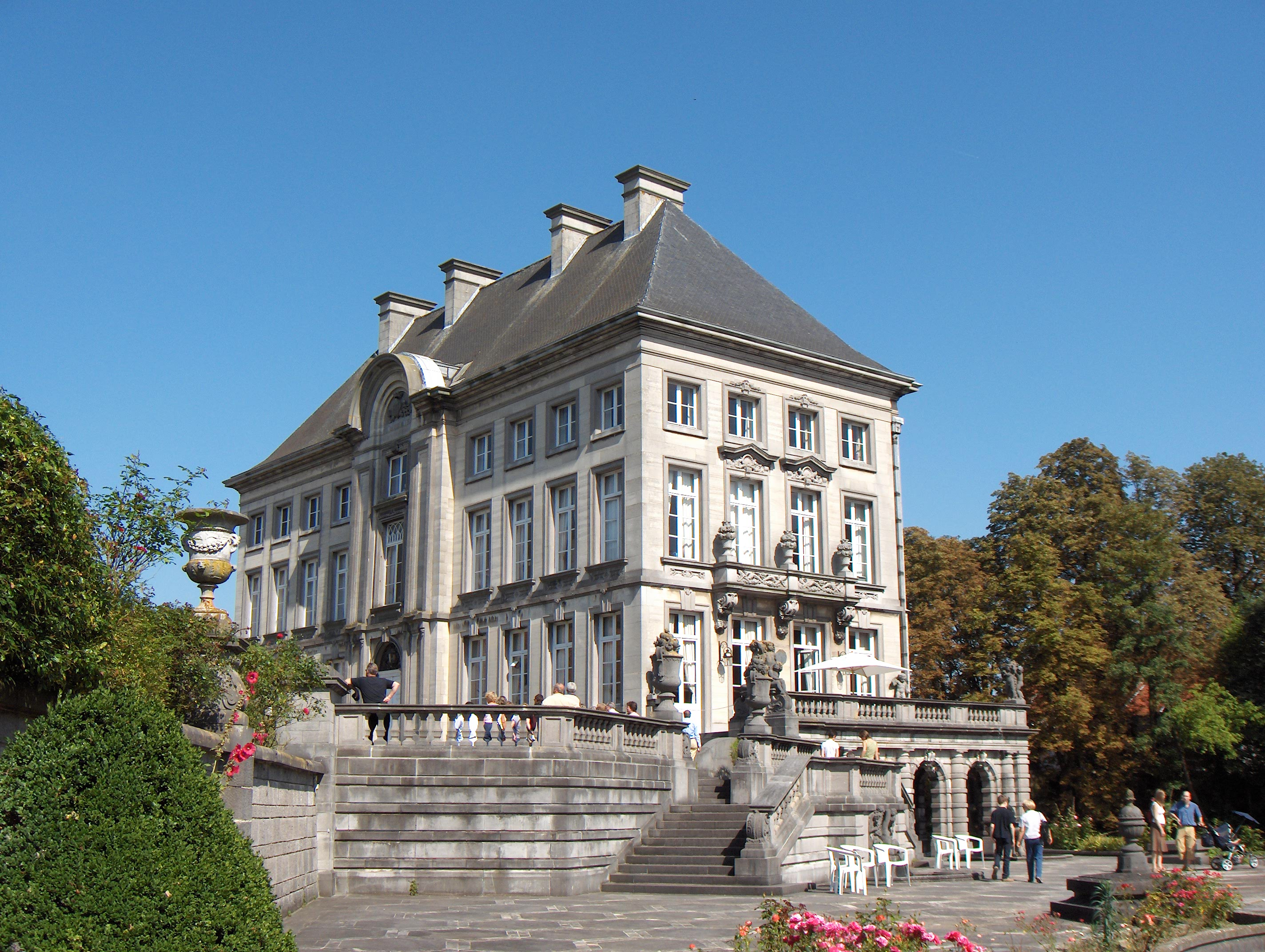
Feluy Castle, the residence of the Prince of Grimberghen

Louis served in the French Army during the War of the League of Augsburg (also known as the Nine Years' War), participating in the Siege of Philippsburg in 1688, the Battle of Fleurus in 1690, and Battle of Steenkerque in 1692. After his military service, Grimberghen entered the service of Charles VII, the Holy Roman Emperor who was also King of Bohemia and Elector of Bavaria, who made Louis a Count. He served as Charles VII's (until 1742, Charles-Albert was not emperor and not recognised as Charles VII) diplomatic envoy from the Electorate of Bavaria to France From 1733 to 1736 and again from 1741 to 1742 and 1745 to 1747. The title Prince of Grimberghen, which had been held by his late brother-in-law, who died without issue in 1721, was bestowed upon him by the Emperor in 1742.

The Prince was also the author of a collection of pieces of literature, containing Timander instructed by his Genius and The Dream of Alcibiades (1749).

== Personal life ==
Grimbergen was married to Madeleine Marie de Berghes (c. 1680–1744). She was a daughter of Belgian noble Philippe François de Berghes, 1st Prince of Grimberghen and the former Marie-Jacques de Lalaing. His wife's elder brother was Alphonse, 2nd Prince of Grimberghen, a Grandee of Spain who married Anne Henriette Rohan-Chabot (a daughter of Louis, Duke of Rohan). She was also a niece of Georges-Louis de Berghes, Prince-Bishop of Liège. Together, Louis and Madeleine were the parents of:

- Thérèse Pelagie d’Albert, Princess of Grimberghen (d. 1736), who married her distant cousin Marie Charles Louis d'Albert, 5th Duke of Luynes (1717–1771), the only child of Charles, 4th Duke of Luynes, (Note: Charles, 4th Duke of Luynes (1695–1758) was the grandson of Charles Honoré d'Albert, 3rd Duke of Luynes (1646–1712), the Prince of Grimberghen's much older half-brother from his father's first marriage to Louise Marie Séguier, Marquise d'O.) on 22 January 1735.

His wife died on 3 November 1744. The Prince of Grimbergen died on 8 November 1758 at the Hôtel du Lude in Paris.
