= Charles d'Albert, 3rd Duke of Chaulnes =

French diplomat (1625–1698)

Charles d'Albert
- 3rd Duke of Chaulnes
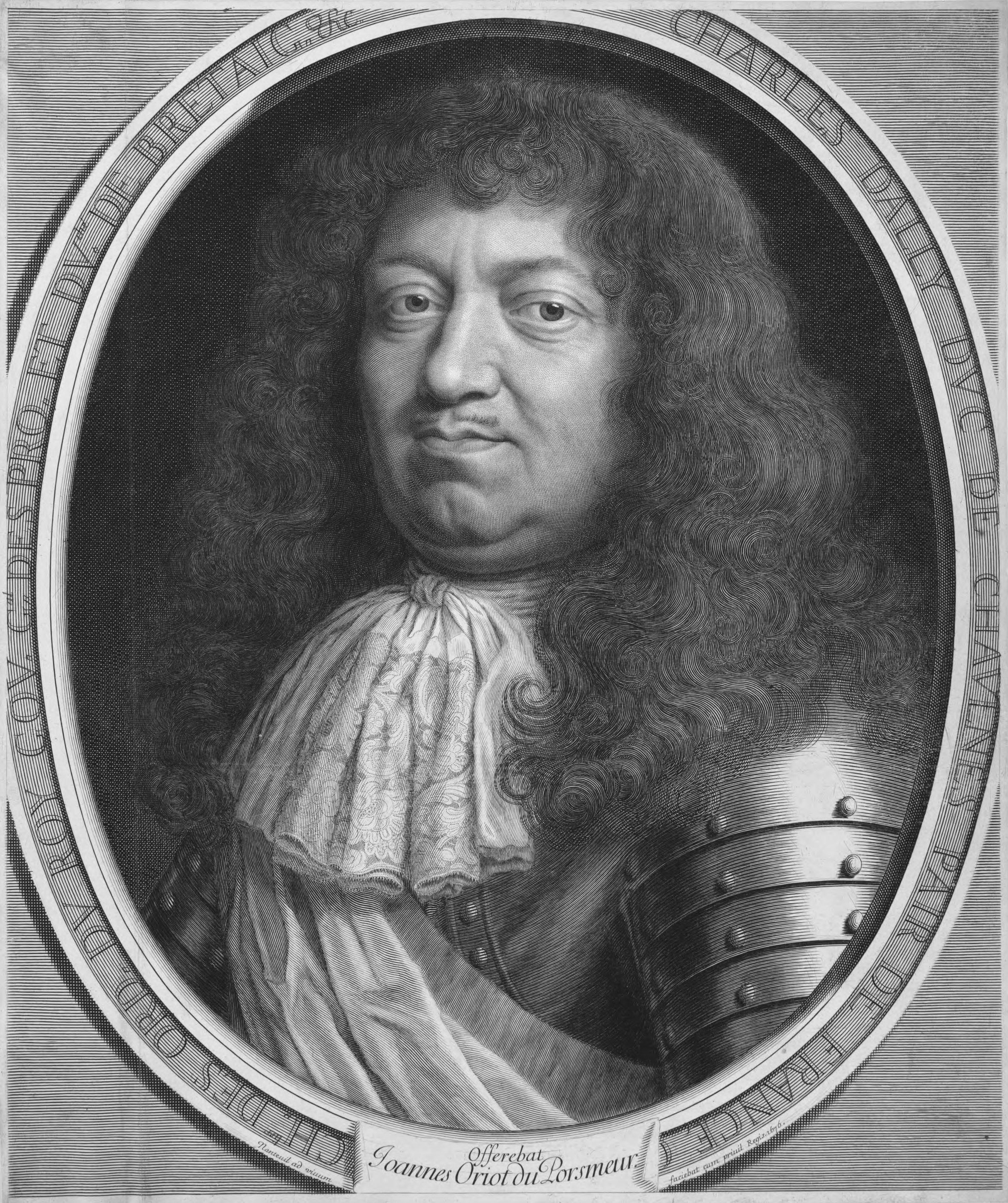
- Portrait of Charles d'Albert by Robert Nanteuil, 1676
- Other titles: Vidame d'Amiens; Seigneur of Picquigny
- Born: 1625
- Died: 9 April 1698 (aged 72–73)
- Offices: French Ambassador to the Holy See
- Noble family: House d'Albert
- Father: Honoré d'Albert
- Mother: Claire Charlotte d´Ailly

Charles d'Albert, 3rd Duke of Chaulnes (1625 – 4 September 1698), was a French general and diplomat. He was made lieutenant genéleral of the armies in 1655, and chevalier des ordres du roi from 1661. He became third Duke of Chaulnes in 1653 on the death of his elder brother.

== Early life ==
He was the third son of Claire Charlotte d´Ailly, Countess of Chaulnes, Lady of Picquigny, Vidamesse d'Amiens, and Honoré d'Albert, 1st Duke of Chaulnes and Marshal of France who was known as the Marshal de Cadenet. His elder brother was Henri Louis d'Albert d'Ailly, 2nd Duke of Chaulnes, who married Françoise de Neufville and was the father of Madeleine Charlotte d'Albert d'Ailly, but had no male issue. Henrietta Maria, Queen of England, stood as his godmother after her proxy marriage to Charles I of England.

== Career ==
He was lieutenant of the compagnie des chevau-légers de la garde du roi in 1664, French ambassador to Rome for the election of Pope Clement IX in 1667, gouvernor of Brittany in 1670. He returned to Rome the same year for the election of Pope Clement X.

He was sent as French ambassador to Cologne in 1675. He served as the King's commander-in-chief in Brittany, but could not stem the tide of the revolt of the papier timbré in 1675 and demanded intervention from the royal armies and punishment of the rebels. His violence towards the rebels alienated him from his Breton noble allies and gained him the public peasant nickname of "fat pig" ("gros cochon", hoc'h lart in Breton). He remained in command in Brittany until he was made ambassador to Rome a third time in 1689 on the election of Pope Alexander VIII. He was dismissed from government of Brittany in 1693 to be replaced by the comte de Toulouse, and was instead made governor of Guyenne, remaining so until his death.

=== Duke of Chaulnes ===
Upon his brother's death in 1653, he became the 3rd Duke of Chaulnes. The duchy of Chaulnes was established by letters patent in January 1621 and registered on 6 March 1621 at the Parlement of Paris for the benefit of his father, a younger brother of Charles d'Albert, Duke of Luynes.

In 1667, however, to avoid the title passing into disuse, at the request of his mother, he named as his heir, his cousin's son, Charles Honoré d'Albert de Luynes, 7th Duke of Chevreuse (the son of Louis Charles d'Albert de Luynes the 2nd Duke of Luynes). The Duke of Chevreuse's marriage contract stipulated that the title would pass to the youngest child of his marriage, (Note: In 1667, Charles Honoré d'Albert de Luynes married Jeanne Marie Colbert, the daughter of French statesman Jean-Baptiste Colbert, who served as First Minister of State from 1661 until 1683 under the rule of King Louis XIV. Among her siblings were brothers Jean-Baptiste Colbert, Marquis de Seignelay and Jacques-Nicolas Colbert, the Archbishop of Rouen.) and, in case the male line subsequently ended, to the youngest of that name who held the arms of the d'Albert family. Thus two distinct houses were created: Luynes, which the Duke of Chevreuse inherited from his father, and Chaulnes, which remained distinct and separate from the former until the direct line of inheritance came to an end. In that case, the two houses should be reunited until it was possible to separate them again (which happened in 1792).

== Personal life ==
The Duke died, unmarried, on 4 September 1698.
