= Louis Charles d'Albert, 2nd Duke of Luynes =

French nobleman

Louis Charles d'Albert
- 2nd Duke of Luynes; Duke of Chevreuse
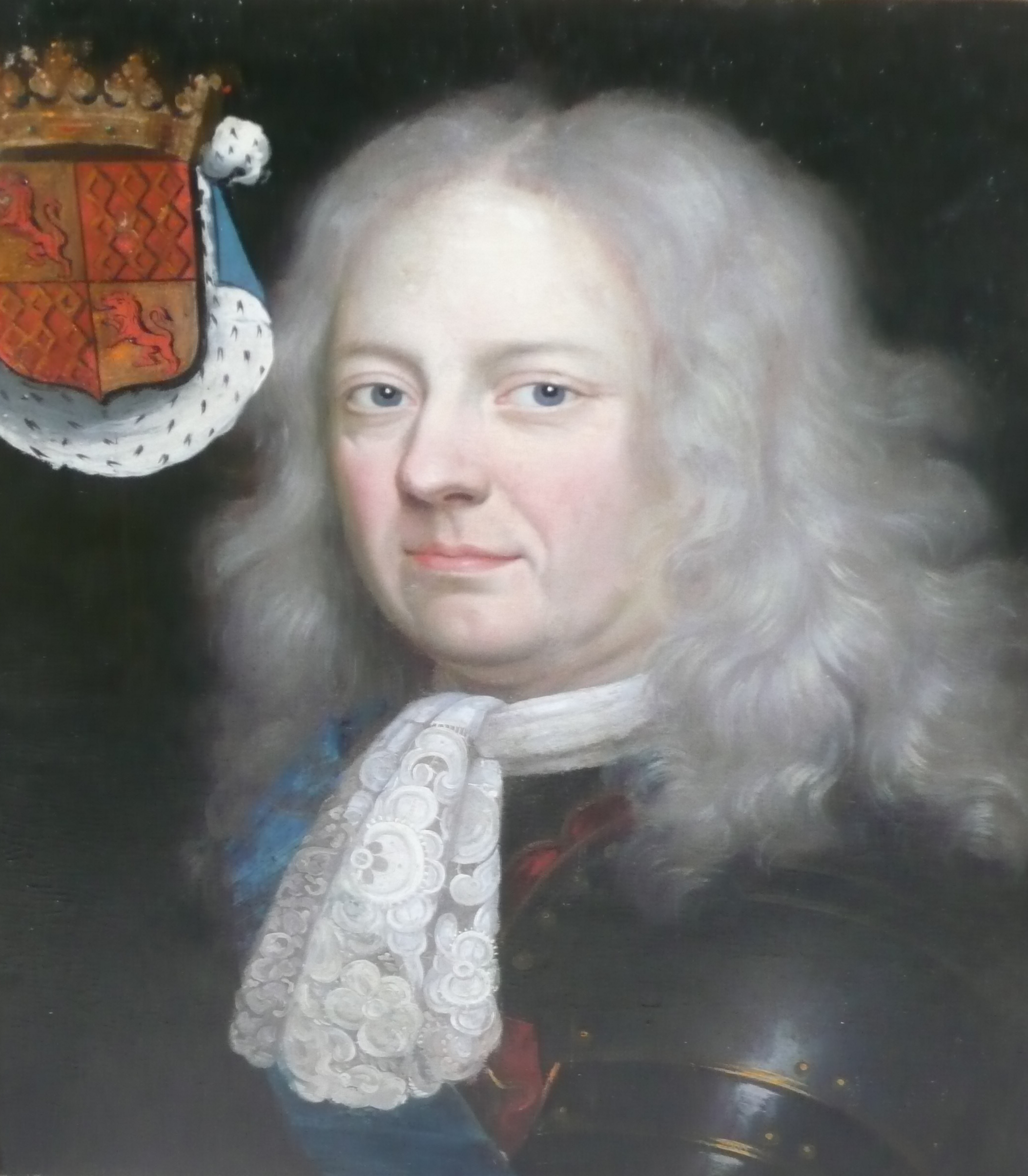
- Born: 25 December 1620; Louvre, France
- Died: 10 October 1690 (aged 69); Paris, France
- Noble family: House d'Albert
- Spouses: Louise Marie Séguier, Marquise of O (m. 1641; died 1651) Anne de Rohan (m. 1661; died 1684) Marguerite d'Aligre (m. 1685)
- Issue: Charles Honoré d'Albert, duc de Luynes; Jeanne Baptiste d'Albert de Luynes; Louis de Luynes, 3rd Prince of Grimberghen; Charles-Hercule d'Albert de Luynes
- Father: Charles d'Albert, 1st Duke of Luynes
- Mother: Marie de Rohan

Louis Charles d'Albert, 2nd Duke of Luynes (25 December 1620 – 10 October 1690), was a French nobleman and peer of France. He was a translator and moralist who was the first translator of the work of René Descartes.

== Early life ==
Duke of Luynes coat of arms

Louis-Charles d'Albert was born 25 December 1620 in the Louvre. He was a son of Charles d'Albert, 1st Duke of Luynes, a favorite of Louis XIII, and Princess Marie Aimée de Rohan, Mademoiselle de Montbazon (1600–1679). After his father's death, his mother remarried to Claude of Lorraine, Duke of Chevreuse (a son of Henry I, Duke of Guise), with whom she had three daughters. Upon Claude's death in 1655, the Chevreuse peerage became extinct and his mother bought the duchy. After her death in August 1679, Louis Charles inherited the duchy of Chevreuse, and his descendants have held it since.

His maternal grandparents were Hercules de Rohan, Duke of Montbazon and, his first wife, Marie de Bretagne d'Avaugour. His paternal grandparents were Anne de Rodulf and Honoré d'Albert (1540–1592), seigneur of Luynes (in today's département Bouches-du-Rhône in Provence), who was in the service of the three last Valois kings and of Henry IV of France. His paternal uncle was Honoré d'Albert, Duke of Chaulnes.

== Career ==
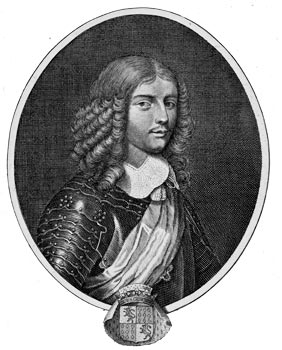
Engraving portrait of Louis Charles d' Albert, by Pierre Daret, 1654

Luynes was received in Parliament as a peer of France on 24 November 1639, provided on 6 January 1643 with the office of Grand Falconer and received knight of the king's orders on 31 December 1661. At the now-vanished Château de Vaumurier, which he had built in the immediate vicinity of the abbey of Port-Royal-des-Champs, he lived closely with the Solitaires of Port-Royal, welcoming Blaise Pascal and the young playwright Jean Racine, and participating in many of the intellectual works of the scholars "Messieurs de Port-Royal", including the translation of the New Testament.

In 1647, he translated into French René Descartes' Méditations Métaphysiques, with Descartes' supervision. He also and wrote several works on morality and piety.

As Mestre de camp (equivalent to colonel), he distinguished himself at the head of his regiment attacked by the Spaniards in front of Arras on August 2, 1640 as well as on several other occasions.

== Personal life ==
On 23 September 1641, Louis Charles married Louise Marie Séguier, Marquise of O (1629–1651), a relative of Chancellor Pierre Séguier. Together, they were the parents of six children:

1. Hercule Louis d'Albert (1644–1645), who died young.
2. Marie Louise d'Albert (1645–1728)
3. Charles Honoré d'Albert, 3rd Duke of Luynes (1646–1712), who married Jeanne Marie Colbert, the daughter of French statesman Jean-Baptiste Colbert, who served as First Minister of State from 1661 until 1683 under Louis XIV.
4. Henriette Thérèse d'Albert (1647–1699)
5. Thérèse d'Albert (b. 1651)
6. Félix Paul d'Albert (b. 1651)

After the death of his first wife, he married his aunt Princess Anne de Rohan-Montbazon (1640–1684) on 4 September 1661. She was the younger half-sister of his mother from his grandfather's second marriage to Madeleine de Lenoncourt. Together, they were the parents of:

1. Françoise Paule Charlotte d'Albert (1662–1670), who died young.
2. Marie Anne d'Albert (1663–1679), who married her second cousin, Charles III, Prince of Guéméné.
3. Marie Charlotte Victoire d'Albert (1667–1701), who married Alexandre Albert François Bathélemy, 4th Duke and 2nd Prince of Bournonville.
4. Catherine Angélique d'Albert (1668–1746), who married Charles Antoine II Gouffier, Marquis of Heilly.
5. Jeanne Baptiste d'Albert de Luynes, comtesse de Verrue (1670–1736), who married Giuseppe Ignazio Scaglia, Conte di Verua; today she is best known as the mistress of King Victor Amadeus II of Sardinia.
6. Louis-Joseph d'Albert de Luynes, 3rd Prince of Grimberghen (1672–1758), who married Magdeleine Marie de Berghes.
7. Charles-Hercule d'Albert de Luynes, (1674–1734), served in the Navy as Chef d'escadre. No issue.
8. Jeanne Thérèse d'Albert de Luynes (1675–1756)

After Anne's death in 1684, he married, thirdly, to Marguerite d'Aligre (1641–1722) on 23 July 1685. She was a daughter of Étienne II d'Aligre, Chancellor of France.

The Duke died on 10 October 1690 in Paris. After his death, his body was transported and buried in the church of the Luynes hospital that he had founded. His widow died on 26 September 1722.
