= Wilhelm Hausenstein =

German art historian, journalist and diplomat

Wilhelm Hausenstein (17 June 1882 – 3 June 1957) was a German writer, journalist, art critic, historian and diplomat. He was the first German ambassador to France following World War II.

== Life and career ==
=== Early life ===
Hausenstein was born in Hornberg to the family of a tax official of the Grand Duchy of Baden. His father died when Wilhelm was only nine years old. After attending the gymnasium in Karlsruhe, he studied in Heidelberg, Tübingen and Munich.

In 1907 he joined the Social Democratic Party and was active in its workers' education company Forward. As a result, a habilitation was impossible. Hausenstein then became a freelance writer. In 1908 he married Marga Schröder, the adopted daughter of a Bremen merchant.

Hausenstein, drawing inspiration from Karl Marx, defended expressionism as the social art par excellence for the future.

=== Literary career ===
During the First World War, Hausenstein was not drafted into military service for health reasons. Since he had published the writing Belgium - Notes in 1915, which also included a chapter on "Economy and Politics", he was regarded as an expert on Belgium and was delegated to the General Government of Belgium, the German administration of the occupied country. From January 1916 he was editor of the German-Belgian monthly Belfried. In Brussels in 1916, Hausenstein met Alice Marguerite (Margot) Kohn (1890–1997). Kohn's husband at the time, Richard Lipper, died in a military hospital on November 22, 1916. At the end of October 1917, after his service in Brussels had ended, Hausenstein returned to Munich, started at the newspaper "Münchner Latest News" and at the same time became a freelancer for the Frankfurter Zeitung. Hausenstein motivated Ulrich Christoffel to write art-critical reports for the Münchner Neuste Nachrichten.

After divorcing his first wife Marga, he married in 1919 the widow Margot Kohn.

In 1926 Hausenstein published a comprehensive article on the Baroque in the Soviet Encyclopedia. After the Nazis seized power in 1933, the police forced Hausenstein's dismissal without notice as a member of the editorial board of the Münchner Neuste Nachrichten.

=== In Nazi Germany ===
From 1934 to 1943 Hausenstein was responsible for the literature sheet and the women's supplement of the Frankfurter Zeitung. On November 24, 1936, he was expelled from the Reich Literature Chamber and was no longer allowed to publish books, because he had refused to designate modern works as degenerate art and to remove the names of Jewish artists from his art history. In 1943 he was also expelled from the Reich Press Chamber. As a result, he lost his job at the Frankfurter Zeitung (shortly before it had to cease publication) and was henceforth subject to a ban on all journalistic work. Hausenstein concentrated on his autobiography Lux Perpetua and prepared other books, constantly in fear that his wife Margot would get rounded up by the Nazi regime.

=== Post WW2 and later life ===
After the end of the war, the US occupying power offered him the position of editor-in-chief of the Süddeutsche Zeitung in 1945; Hausenstein declined the offer because of his failing health and his literary plans.

In 1949 he founded the Deutsche Akademie für Sprache und Dichtung with 48 other writers.

In 1950, at the personal request of Konrad Adenauer, he went to Paris as Consul General of the newly founded Federal Republic. He then became chargé d'affaires and finally first ambassador of the Federal Republic of Germany in France. In early 1955, Hausenstein retired; his successor was Vollrath von Maltzan.

== Wilhelm Hausenstein Society ==
The Wilhelm Hausenstein Society was founded in November 2001. to preserve the memory of Wilhelm Hausenstein and to promote the research and dissemination of his works. To this day, it organizes the Wilhelm-Hausenstein Symposia in Hornberg every two years.

== Bibliography ==
- Theodor Heuss, Privatier und Elder Statesman. Edited by Frieder Günther, p. 555 et al.
