= Erica Pappritz =

German diplomat (1893–1972)

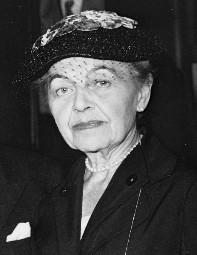
- Born: 25 June 1893
- Died: 4 February 1972 (aged 78); Bonn, West Germany
- Occupation: Civil servant
- Years active: 1919–58
- Notable work: Buch der Etikette; Etiquette neu

Erica Pappritz (25 June 1893 – 4 February 1972) was a German diplomat and civil servant. She co-wrote two books on social etiquette, Buch der Etikette ("The Book of Etiquette") and Etikette neu ("New Etiquette").

== Personal life ==
Pappritz's father was a Rittmeister in the German Army. Her name was often incorrectly translated as "Freifrau von" ("Dame of"), in reference to German poet Marie Luise Kaschnitz.

In 1972, she died in Bonn of heart failure.

== Career ==
In 1919, Pappritz joined the Federal Foreign Office, working in the foreign trade office. She supervised the Diplomatic Corps during the Nuremberg Rallies. In 1943, Pappritz became a civil servant. On her 50th birthday, she was given the salary of a first-grade Legation Council member. In 1944, she was transferred to Karpacz, after her office was converted into an armaments factory. After the Second World War, Pappritz was made to attend a denazification board meeting along with Vollrath von Maltzan. Both said that they had rejected Nazism. Pappritz had been a member of the Nazi Party.

Pappritz settled in Eichenau, Bavaria, and in 1949, she was asked to take the Bavarian State Chancellery to Bonn. In 1950, she agreed the etiquette during a disagreement between Cologne and Bonn over the seating arrangements at an event to celebrate 1900 years since the founding of Cologne.

In 1956, Pappritz and Karlheinz Graudenz wrote the book Buch der Etikette (The Book of Etiquette). At the time, she was working as the Legation Counsellor and Deputy Chief of Protocol to the Foreign Office in Bonn. The book had a focus on increasing civility in post-Nazi Germany, focusing on politeness and a respect for human rights. The book includes sections on correct odour and on how Bonn diplomats liked to carry umbrellas. At the time, the book was criticised for promoting snobbery. Stockholms-Tidningen journalist Christer Jäderlund said: "One does not know whether one should laugh or cry over this etiquette bible certified by the West German Ministry of Foreign Affairs in 1957." Pappritz made some corrections to the original book, and the third edition was published in 1957.

In 1967, Pappritz and Graudenz wrote another book, Etikette neu (New Etiquette). The book became available at the German Bundestag in 2007.

Pappritz retired from public office in 1958, after which she occasionally lectured on tourism, advertising, and social etiquette.

== Books ==
- Graudenz, Karlheinz, Pappritz, Erica, Buch der Etikette (1956)
- Graudenz, Karlheinz, Pappritz, Erica, Etikette neu (1967) ISBN 3-517-00026-4
