= Antoinette d'Albert =

Antoinette d'Albert de Luynes, Madame de Vernet (died 1644) was a French court official. She served as the dame d'atour to the queen of France, Anne of Austria, between 1615 and 1626.

== Life ==
She was the daughter of Honoré d'Albert, seigneur of Luynes, and Anne de Rodulph, sister of Charles d'Albert, duc de Luynes, and married in 1605 to Barthélémy, seigneur de Vernet, and in 1628 to Henri Robert de La Marck (1575-1652), duc de Bouillon.

In 1625, she was one of the witnesses interrogated during the Buckingham Affair, when queen Anne and George Villiers, 1st Duke of Buckingham were suspected of adultery during the journey through the French coast for the departure of Henrietta Maria of France to England. While the whole affair was dismissed, as the witnesses assured the king that, regardless of the attraction between the queen and the duke, adultery had been impossible simply because they had not been alone with each other long enough to have intercourse. Antoinette d'Albert de Luynes was nevertheless dismissed for having left them alone for the famous moment, during which Anne called out, leading to the scandal and informal interrogation of witnesses.

Court offices
Preceded by Leonora Dori	Dame d'atour to the Queen of France; 1615–1626	Succeeded by Marie-Catherine de Senecey
