= Vincent Rumpff =

German diplomat

Vincent von Rumpff

Ambassador of the Hanseatic cities in Paris
- In office 1824–1864
- Preceded by: Konradin Christoph Abel
- Succeeded by: Hermann von Heeren

Personal details
- Born: 10 January 1789 Hamburg, Holy Roman Empire
- Died: 13 February 1867 (aged 78) Paris, France
- Spouse: Eliza Astor (m. 1825; died 1838)
- Education: University of Heidelberg; University of Göttingen

Vincent II, Count von Rumpff (10 January 1789 – 13 February 1867) was a German diplomat who served as Minister of the Hanseatic cities to the United States and Paris.

== Early life ==
Count von Rumpff was born on 10 January 1789 in Hamburg, Germany, then a part of the Holy Roman Empire. His paternal grandfather was Vincent Rumpff (1701–1781), a Senator who served as Mayor of Hamburg in 1765.

Rumpff studied at the University of Heidelberg and the University of Göttingen, receiving a law degree.

== Career ==
Upon the dissolution of the Holy Roman Empire in 1806, the Free Imperial City of Hamburg became a sovereign state with the official title of the Free and Hanseatic City of Hamburg. Hamburg was briefly annexed by Napoleon I to the First French Empire, but Russian forces under General Bennigsen freed the city in 1814. Hamburg re-assumed its pre-1811 status as a city-state in 1814 when Rumpff returned to his hometown. He joined the diplomatic service and served as attaché at the Congress of Vienna which confirmed Hamburg's independence and it became one of 39 sovereign states of the German Confederation.

In 1815, he was sent to Frankfurt as legation secretary of the Hamburg embassy to the Bundestag. In 1819, he acquired Hamburg citizenship. Hamburg entrusted him with the newly founded Hanseatic embassy at the Imperial Court in Vienna, and appointed him Minister.

In 1824, he took over the post of Minister at the French court in Paris and was a representative of the Hanseatic merchants in Paris. The other three free cities of Bremen, Frankfurt and Lübeck also delegated their diplomatic representation to him. From 1827 to 1828, Rumpff served as Minister of the Hanseatic cities of Bremen, Hamburg and Lübeck to the United States. While Minister, Rumpff and his colleague James Colquhoun in London, signed a series of commercial treaties and trade agreements, including with the United States of America in 1827 and 1828, France in 1843, Sardinia in 1844, Monaco in 1846, New Granada in 1854, and Persia in 1857.

Rumpff retired in 1864 and was succeeded as Ambassador of the Hanseatic cities in Paris by Hermann von Heeren.

== Personal life ==
On 25 October 1825, he was married to the American heiress Eliza Astor (1801–1838), a daughter of Sarah Cox (née Todd) Astor and John Jacob Astor. Eliza's father was born in the Electoral Palatinate before moving to America just after the end of the American Revolution, where he prospered as a merchant and investor, becoming the wealthiest person in the country. Upon their marriage, Astor settled $300,000 on her, and gave her the Villa Le Saugy at Genthod, where they spent their summers. (Note: The Villa le Saugy was built in 1701 for banker Abraham Gallatin. Astor purchased the mansion, which had previously owned by the Russian Countess Catherine de Bruce (daughter of Count James Bruce and Praskovya Bruce), for $50,000. In the 1980s, the villa was host to U.S. President Ronald Reagan and Mikhail Gorbachev. In 1993, the villa hosted President Alija Izetbegović, Thorvald Stoltenberg and David Owen to discuss Bosnian War peace plans. In 2009, the villa was site of Iran nuclear negotiations between Saeed Jalili, Javier Solana.) Later, the Rumpffs lived in Rolle in the canton of Vaud on the northwestern shore of Lake Geneva in Switzerland. They did not have any children.

In light of riots in Paris which led to the July Revolution of 1830, and the abdication of French King Charles X, Rumpff sent his wife back to America. She arrived in New York after King Louis-Philippe was restored to the throne. His wife returned to Paris with her sister Dorothea who lived in Paris for several years. Although they were welcome at the court of King Louis-Philippe and Queen Marie Amelie, his wife gave up court appearances, balls, going to the theater, and "other worldly leisure" to focus on charities. In Paris, she created a library of inspirational books for children of the English-speaking residents of Paris. She also opened a school at her villa at Genthod.

His wife died in Rolle on 11 April 1838 and was buried at the Cimetière de Bursins. After her death, in 1839, her memoirs were published together with the memoirs of Albertine, Baroness Staël von Holstein, under the title: Transplanted Flowers: Or, Memoirs of Mrs. Rumpff, Daughter of John Jacob Astor, Esq., and the Duchess De Broglie, Daughter of Madame De Stael. They were referred to as "models of peacetime progress and religious purity".

Rumpff died on 13 February 1867 in Paris and was buried at his property, Saint-Vincent, near Gilly.
