= Hermann von Heeren =

German diplomat (1833–1899)

Hermann von Heeren Count von Heeren
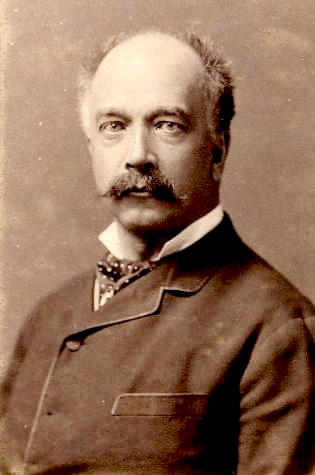

Minister of the Hanseatic Cities in Paris
- In office 1864–1870
- Preceded by: Vincent Rumpff
- Succeeded by: Harry von Arnim (As Ambassador of the German Empire)

Personal details
- Born: Johann Hermann Heeren; 4 October 1833 Waldenau, Holstein
- Died: 6 May 1899 (aged 65) Rottenbuch, Upper Bavaria
- Relations: Arnold Heeren (great-uncle)
- Education: University of Heidelberg; University of Göttingen
- Awards: Legion d'Honneur

Count Johann Hermann von Heeren (4 October 1833 – 6 May 1899) was a German diplomat from the Hanseatic Cities.

== Early life ==
Heeren was born on 4 October 1833 in Waldenau, Holstein and was the son of Georg Heinrich Heeren and Amanda Juliane von Hollen. He had a twin sister Ida Wilhelmine Heeren (1833–1898), who was married to Heinrich Amsinck. He was also a great-nephew of the historian Arnold Hermann Ludwig Heeren.

Heeren studied law at the University of Heidelberg and graduated from the University of Göttingen. At, he became active in the German Student Corps in 1854 and the Corps Hannovera Göttingen in 1855.

== Career ==
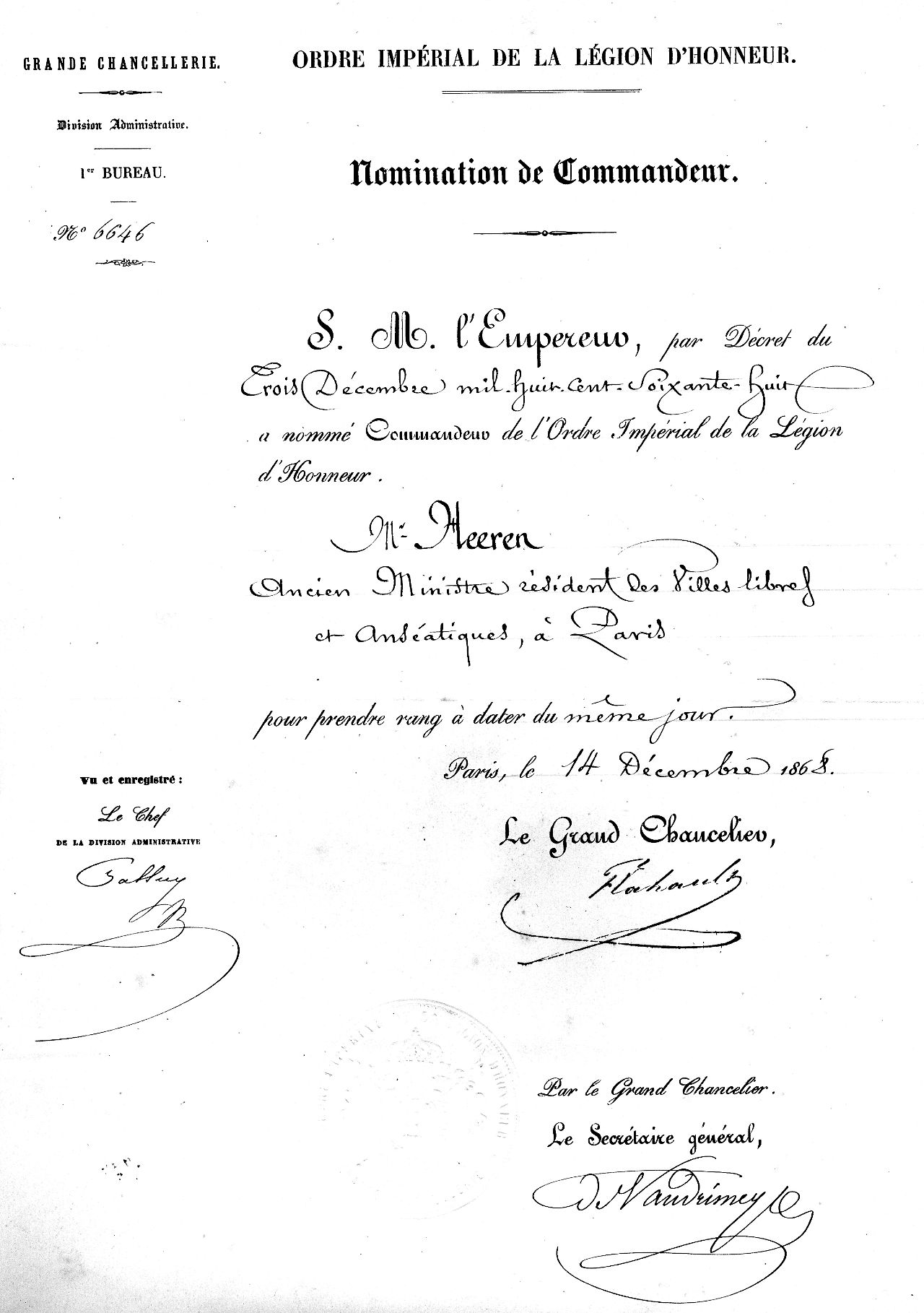
Heeren's appointment as Minister in Paris

In 1864, Heeren succeeded Vincent Rumpff as Minister Resident in Paris of the three free Hanseatic cities of Bremen, Hamburg and Lübeck the Imperial French court of Napoléon III. In December 1868, he was made a Commander of the Legion of Honor.
When Napoleon III started the Franco-Prussian War in July 1870, he helped Empress Eugénie de Montijo escape from Paris via Deauville into exile in London. Heeren then resigned from his post as diplomatic representative of the cities in Paris. After the unification of the German Empire, the Prussian diplomat Harry von Arnim who had featured prominently in the negotiation of the Treaty of Frankfurt served as the German Ambassador in Paris.

=== Later life ===
He retired in Bavaria and acquired the Rottenbuch estate in Ammerthal from the former Rottenbuch monastery. He also owned a brewery in Rottenbuch and founded a family fideikommiss (de:Familienfideikommiss).

On 28 July 1889, Luitpold, Prince Regent of Bavaria elevated him to the Bavarian nobility due to his services to Bavaria's agriculture.

== Personal life ==
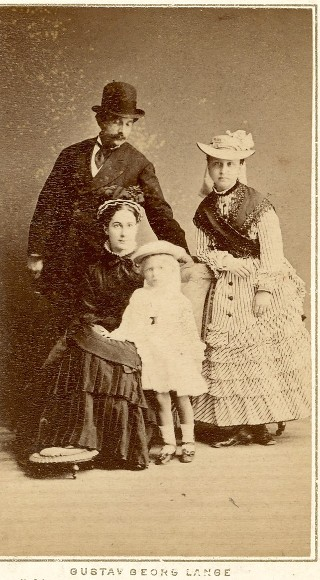
Von Heeren and his family

Johann Hermann von Heeren was married to his Spanish-born first cousin Maria del Carmen Heeren y Massa (1849–1924), the daughter of his uncle Karl August Heeren and the former Maria de los Dolores Ramona Angela Baldomera Massa y Grana. The couple had four children:

- August Wilhelm Alexander von Heeren (1870–1927), a landowner in Rottenbuch who served as Imperial Privy Councilor in Strasbourg; he married Jeanne-Marie von Sonnenberg.
- Eggebert Hermann von Heeren (1880–1957), First Lieutenant in the Air Force, landowner at Eppishausen Castle near Erlen in Thurgau (Switzerland).
- Viktor von Heeren (1881–1949), who served as envoy to Prague and Belgrade.
- Maria del Consuelo von Heeren (1889–1952)

Von Heeren died on 6 May 1899 in Rottenbuch in Upper Bavaria.
