= Honoré d'Albert, 1st Duke of Chaulnes =

First duke of Chaulnes

Honoré d'Albert
- 1st Duke of Chaulnes, Peer of France; Knight of the Order of the Holy Spirit; Vidame of Amiens; Seigneur of Picquigny
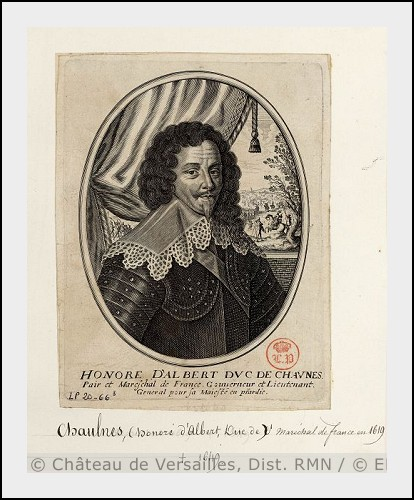

- Coat of arms
- Successor: Henri Louis d'Albert d'Ailly
- Born: 1581
- Died: 30 October 1649 (aged 67–68)
- Noble family: House d'Albert
- Spouses: Claire Charlotte Eugénie d'Ailly, Countess of Chaulnes
- Issue: Henri Louis d'Albert d'Ailly; Charles d'Albert d'Ailly; Armand d'Albert d'Ailly
- Father: Honoré d'Albert
- Mother: Anne of Rodulf
- Occupation: Marshal of France; Governor of Picardy; Governor of Auvergne

Honoré d'Albert, 1st Duke of Chaulnes (1581 – 30 October 1649), Marshal of France, Vidame of Amiens and Seigneur of Picquigny through his marriage to Claire Charlotte Eugénie d'Ailly, Countess of Chaulnes, was the first Duke of Chaulnes, a title created by Louis XIII in 1621.

== Biography ==
He came to court under the name of Cadenet. His brother, Charles d'Albert, Duke of Luynes, the favorite of Louis XIII, brought him the good graces of the prince, who made him in 1615 an officer in the government of Amboise, of which Luynes was Governor. In 1617 he was made mestre de camp of the Régiment de Normandie after the banishment of the Count of La Penne, the son of Concino Concini.

1619 saw d'Albert appointed to be Governor of Picardy, Knight of the Order of the Holy Spirit, and Marshal of France. In 1620 he married Claire Charlotte Eugénie d'Ailly, on the condition that he and his descendants take the name and coat of arms of the House d'Ailly, and that he would become Vidame of Amiens and Seigneur of Picquigny. He came to London as ambassador in 1620 and King James gave him and his entourage gifts of jewels made by George Heriot.

Made Duke of Chaulnes and Marshal of France in 1621, he took the name of Marshal Duke of Chaulnes. He served at the Siege of Saint-Jean-d'Angély and the Siege of Montauban. That same year he obtained the government and citadel of Amiens after his brother died. He commanded, with the Marshal de La Force, the army of Picardy, keeping it under royal control, and was made its Governor in 1635. He commanded the same army in 1635 during the Franco-Spanish War, entering Artois, where he razed multiple castles and passed through Grévillers, looting what provisions he could take and burning the rest to deprive the enemy.

The Spanish Army, 14,000 strong, advanced, but the Duke of Chaulnes was too weak to go into combat, instead distributing his troops along the border with the Spanish Netherlands to harass the enemy. However, he was reinforced by the cavalry levies from Boulonnais, allowing him to drive back the Spanish. When new cavalry regiments were formed in 1636, one was named after the Duke of Chaulnes. To retaliate for the damage done by the Spanish to Picardy during the last campaign, the Duke assembled 1200 men in January 1636, entered Artois and burned numerous villages, in addition to defeating 400 Irish mercenaries.

In 1640, with the Marshal of Châtillon, he won the Siege of Arras on 10 August. After this campaign, the Duke ceased to serve in the army of Louis XIII, and he resigned from the government of Picardy in 1645. That same year he was appointed Governor of Auvergne, a position which he held until his death on 30 October 1649.

He is also known for making the cadenette hairstyle fashionable.

== Relationships and issue ==
On 14 January 1620, Albert married Claire Charlotte Eugénie d'Ailly. They had three children:

- Henri-Louis d'Albert d'Ailly (1620–1653), 2nd Duke of Chaulnes
- Charles d'Albert d'Ailly (1625–1698), 3rd Duke of Chaulnes
- Armand d'Albert d'Ailly (1635–1656)

== Coat of arms ==
Image
Blazon
Arms of the Duke of Chaulnes

Field : quarterly 1st and 4th Or, lion rampant displayed Gules, armed, langued and crowned Azure (d'Albert); 2nd and 3rd Gules, two branches of the wild service tree Argent, in double saltire, chief chequy Gules and Argent (d'Ailly).

== Bibliography ==
- Bouillet, Marie-Nicolas; Chassang, Alexis (1878). "Honoré d'Albert (1581–1649)". Dictionnaire universel d'histoire et de géographie.
