= Hôtel Beauharnais =

Historic house in Paris, France

Coordinates: 48.8607°N 2.3223°E

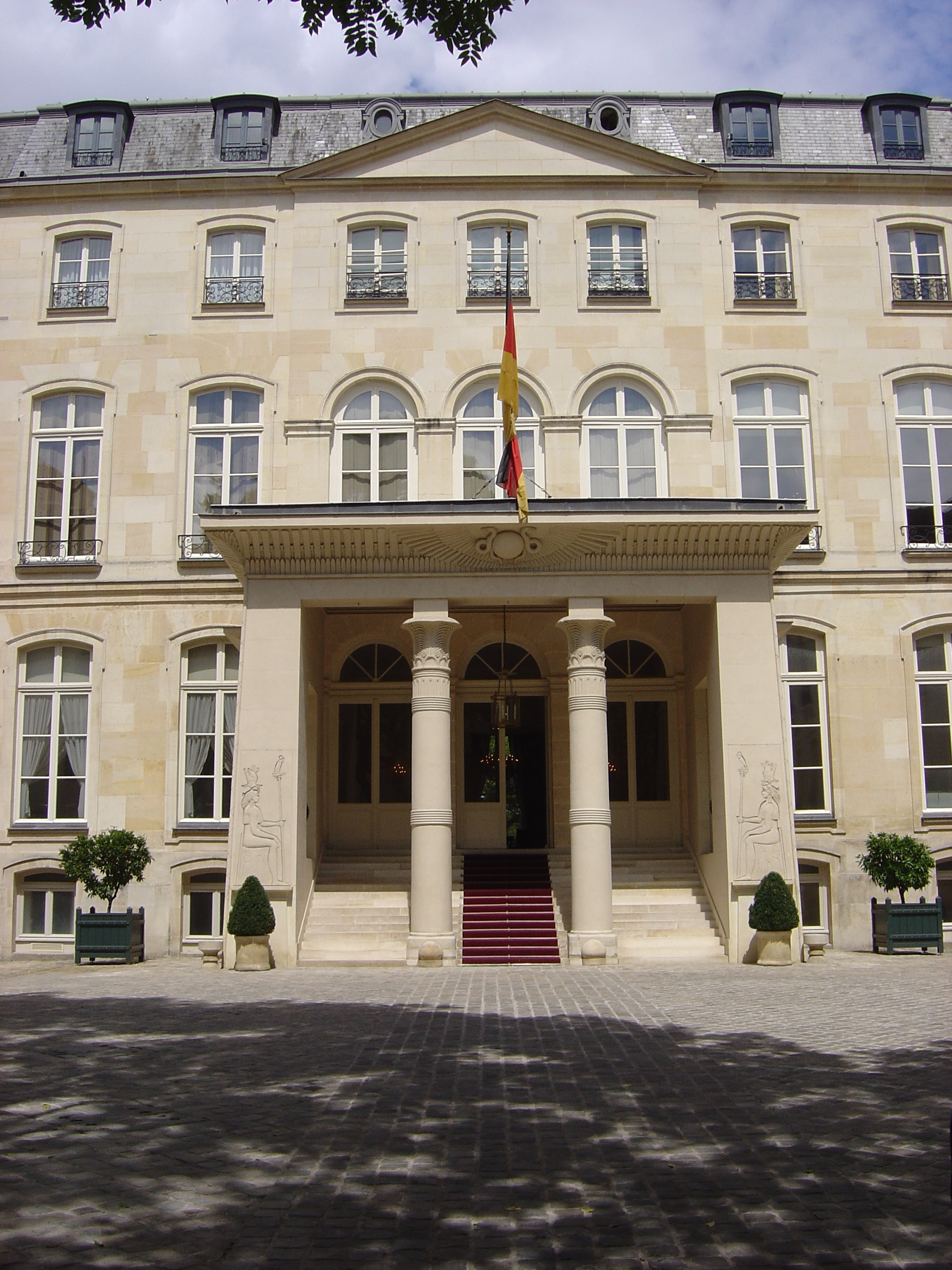
Portico of the Hôtel Beauharnais

The Hôtel Beauharnais (French: [otɛl boaʁnɛ]) or Hôtel de Beauharnais is a historic hôtel particulier, a type of large French townhouse, in the 7th arrondissement of Paris. It was designed by architect Germain Boffrand. Its construction was completed in 1714. By 1803, the structure was purchased by Eugène de Beauharnais, who had it rebuilt in an Empire style. It has been listed as a historical monument since 25 July 1951. Today it serves as the official residence of the German Ambassador to France.

== Location ==
The premises are situated on the left bank of the Seine river, between the Palais Bourbon, the seat of the National Assembly, in the west and the Musée d'Orsay in the east. The cour d'honneur is located on the Rue de Lille in the south, to the north, an English garden offers scenic views to the Seine and beyond up to the Tuileries Garden. The vast property is not accessible to the public.

== History ==
The building was erected at the behest of Foreign Minister Colbert de Torcy (1665–1746), shortly before his dismissal by Regent Philippe of Orléans. Then named Hôtel de Torcy, it served as Colbert's retirement home where he kept his extensive art collection and completed his memoirs.

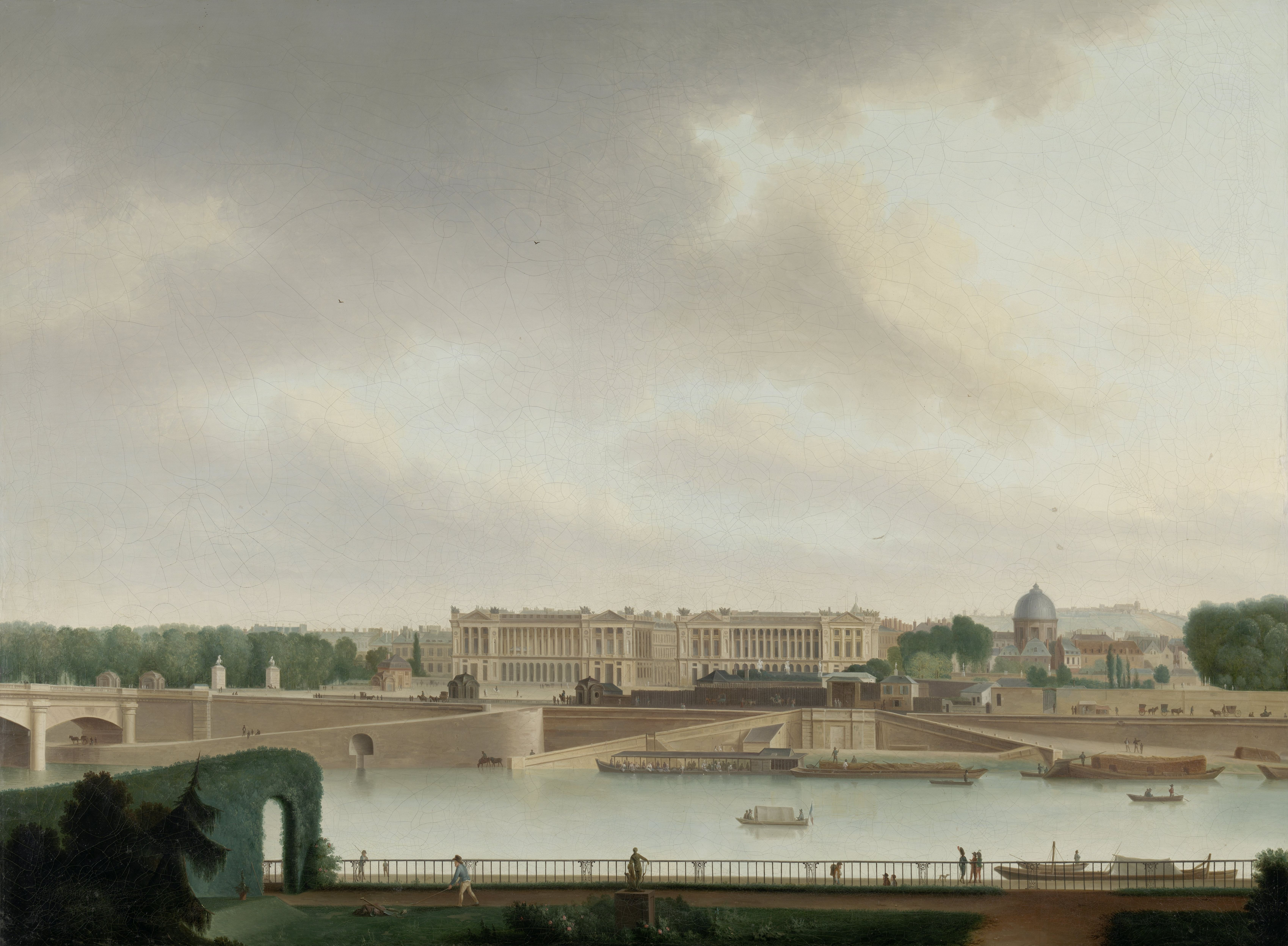
View over the Seine and the Tuileries from the location (1801)

After several changes of ownership and being plundered during the French Revolution, it passed to Eugène de Beauharnais, a stepson of Napoleon who became Viceroy of Italy and also aimed at the succession to the French throne. The building then received its present-day portico in an Egyptomanian style which was popular in the wake of the French campaign in Egypt. Opulently furnished with large-scale paintings by Hubert Robert, the spacious rooms fitted with Beauharnais's great demands. However, the Viceroy had little opportunity to reside at his Paris home. When Napoleon married the Habsburg archduchess Marie Louise in 1810, he used the Hôtel as a guest house for Beauharnais' father-in-law, King Maximilian I Joseph of Bavaria.

After the French defeat in the Napoleonic Wars and the Congress of Vienna, the premises were first rented and finally purchased by Prussia under King Frederick William III in 1818 and became the seat of the Prussian legation. In 1862 Otto von Bismarck resided here, before his appointment as Minister president by King William I in September.

Following the Franco-Prussian War of 1870–71, it served as the embassy of the German Empire to the French Republic. Prince Chlodwig of Hohenlohe-Schillingsfürst, ambassador from 1873, hosted extravagant ceremonies to improve Franco–German relations. The impressive architecture and premises inspired Karl Friedrich Schinkel and Leo von Klenze, as well as the painter Max Beckmann. In 1894 the theft of a letter addressed to the German military attaché Max von Schwartzkoppen at the embassy triggered the Dreyfus affair.

On 7 November 1938, German diplomat Ernst vom Rath was shot by 17-year-old Herschel Grynszpan, a Polish-Jewish expatriate from Germany. He confessed to shooting vom Rath, and explained his motive was to avenge "12,000 persecuted Jews". This followed him learning of the decree by the Gestapo to arrest and deport all Polish Jews from Germany, with his parents being stranded at the Polish border. This provided the Nazi authorities with the pretext for the antisemitic Kristallnacht pogrom.

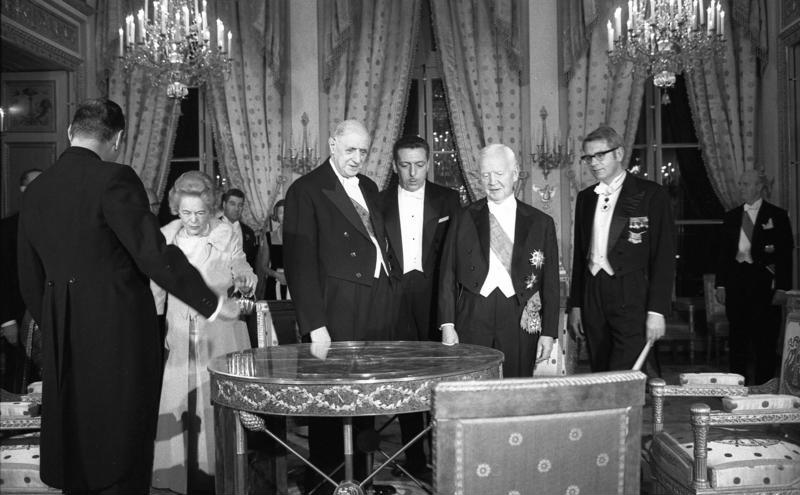
President Charles de Gaulle and President Heinrich Lübke at a 1968 reception

During World War II, the building served as the Paris residence of Otto Abetz, German ambassador to Vichy France, until it was confiscated in 1944. Held by the French Ministry of Foreign Affairs, it was restored to West Germany in 1961 during the negotiations on the Élysée Treaty. As a new embassy then already was under construction on Avenue Franklin Delano Roosevelt, the building solely served for representative purposes. Extensively renovated and re-opened as the ambassador's residence in 1968, the building's history has been documented by the German Forum for Art History Paris.
