= August Baron de Cetto =

August Baron de Cetto (6 September 1794 – 7 August 1879) was a Kingdom of Bavaria diplomat, state councillor and chamberlain.

== Life ==
August of Cetto was the son of the jurist and diplomat Anton of Cetto and his wife Anna née Cazin. His father was the Bavarian envoy in Paris and was in 1812 made a Baron by King Maximilian I Joseph of Bavaria. The Cetto family was an Italian patrician family originally from Como . They settled in Bohemia, where they were raised to hereditary knighthood in 1703 by the Holy Roman Emperor.

August of Cetto began his career in 1816 as a civil service candidate in the administration of the Circle of Isar (now the province of Upper Bavaria). In 1817 he moved to the Bavarian Ministry of Foreign Affairs, which appointed him as an attaché in the Legation in [St. Petersburg], Russia, in 1819. In 1820 he attained the rank of Legation Secretary, from 1821 based in London, where he became Envoy in 1822.

Following the Battle of Navarino, in which British, French, and Russian ships sank a large part of the Turkish fleet, on October 20, 1827, and subsequent events in Greece, Cetto held negotiations with Lord Palmerston, the Russian Ambassador Christoph von Lieven and the French Ambassador Talleyrand, which resulted in the Treaty of Rome of 1832 concluded by France, Great Britain and Russia, and Ludwig I, King of Bavaria, as guardian of the minor Prince Otto, concerning the election of Prince Otto as king of Greece. "

In April 1831 August of Cetto married Elizabeth Catherine, the daughter of Colonel Thomas Burrowes of Dangan Castle, County Meath. The couple had three children, including Anton Wilhelm. In 1833, Cetto was appointed the Bavarian Envoy at the Imperial Court in Vienna. From 1835 to 1867 he again served as Bavarian Envoy to London.

Cetto retired in 1867 and lived in No.6 Hill Street in Berkeley Square Gardens, taking part in the social life of the metropolis, and still attending the receptions at the court.

His son Anton Wilhelm de Cetto was Bavarian Envoy to the Holy See, 1883 – 1906.
