= Marcelle von Wendland =

British businesswoman

Marcelle von Wendland (born 1970) is a British entrepreneur, executive, published author and expert in the area of risk and financial instruments as well as semantic data models and data utilities. She is known for her pioneering work on a semantic data model for financial instruments that allows facilitates industry wide data utilities such as the European Central Bank Central Securities Database (ECB CSDB). The approach known as The Building Block Approach is used by the ECB CSDB and covered in the book Pricing, Risk, and Performance Measurement in Practice (ISBN 9780123745217 and 9780080923048) co-authored by von Wendland and ECB Senior Economist Wolfgang Schwerdt. Von Wendland is also known for her amateur yacht racing.

== Career ==
She is the co-founder and CEO of Bancstreet Capital Partners Ltd. She was Managing Director at Fincore Ltd which she now continues to support as a consultant. She has previously worked for HypoVereinsbank, Barclays Bank, Goldman Sachs, LCH-Clearnet, the UK HM Revenue and Customs and others.

Von Wendland is a Chartered Fellow of the Chartered Institute for Securities & Investment (CISI). She was deputy chair and elected member of the Risk Forum Committee of CISI from 2002 to 2012 and 2008 to 2009 respectively.

Von Wendland has been an active member of the Private Sector Preparatory Group (LEI-PSPG) for the Legal Entity Identifier set up and run by the Financial Stability Board from 2011 onwards.

She has been an elected and served as member of the Governing Council of the Royal Institute of Navigation (RIN) for two consecutive terms first from August 2010 to July 2012 and then from August 2012 to July 2015. She has also served on the RIN's Finance committee from 2007 to 2013 and the RIN Audit & Risk committee since 2013.

== Politics ==
Von Wendland stood as a candidate for the Liberal Democrats in the 2018 Local Elections in Hounslow Central ward in the London Borough of Hounslow.

== Research ==
She has co-authored the book Pricing, Risk, and Performance Measurement in Practice (ISBN 9780123745217), together with ECB Senior Economist Wolfgang Schwerdt. Her more recent research covers the area of blockchain, Distributed ledger Technology and semantics; this includes a paper with the title: Smart Contracts that are Smart and can function as Legal Contracts A Review of Semantic Blockchain and Distributed Ledger Technologies.

== Background ==
Von Wendland is also a commercially qualified yacht racing skipper and instructor, who skippered the former Volvo Ocean Race Yacht BEL 1 Zest of Belgium in a series of RORC (Royal Ocean Racing Club) races.

She has skippered the 3/4 Tonner IOR Racing Yacht GET CARTER GBR4127R in the RORC Fastnet Races 2007, 2009, 2011 as well as 2013, and has gained an entry in the 2015 Fastnet Race for GBR 2Get Carter.

Von Wendland was born in Munich, Bavaria daughter of Franziska von Wendland and Georg Kress. She grew up first in Holzhausen near Rosenheim, where her mother was a teacher at the Ignaz Guenther Gymnasium and Rosenheim Music School and later in Munich. She attended Theresien Gymnasium Muenchen from 1981 to 1987, St Clare's, Oxford from 1987 to 1989 and London School of Economics where she studied Economics and International Relations. She currently lives in West London.
