= Miguel José de Bournonville, 1st Duke of Bournonville =

Spanish noble (1672-1752)

Miguel José de Bournonville y Sainte-Algonde (Michel Joseph, Duc de Bournonville in French; Diksmuide, Flanders, 30 June 1672 – Madrid, 2 October 1752) was a Spanish noble.

He was Prince of Bournonville in Flanders and starting in 20 January 1717 Baron of Capres. His father was Jean François de Bournonville (1637-1718), his mother Claire de Sainte Aldegonde and his uncle Alexander II de Bournonville. On 21 July 1738, he was made 1st Duke of Bournonville by King Philip V of Spain. He was Knight of the Military Order of San Gennaro, and Knight of the Order of the Golden Fleece since 1709.

He served as Captain of the Spanish Royal Flemish Guards, and the Walloon Guards, before becoming military Governor of Girona.

He became Plenipotentiary Ambassador of Spain in Versailles, France, in 1722 and in Vienna in 1726 under Holy Roman Emperor Charles VI, (1685–1740).

The second Duke of Bournonville, (Spanish title), became Miguel José's nephew, Francisco José de Bournonville, (1710–1769), the son of Miguel José brother Wolfgang de Bournonville, who became also a Knight of the Order of the Golden Fleece in 1753, the year after he inherited the Duchy.

The 3rd Duke, from 1769 to 1791, would be Maximiliano Casimiro de Bournonville, a brother of the 2nd Duke Francisco José mentioned above.
