= August von Wendland =

Bavarian diplomat (1806–1884)

August Freiherr von Wendland (1806–1884) was a diplomat from the Kingdom of Bavaria to France.

He held the post of Chargé d'affaires from 1847 to 1850, and the post of Minister Plenipotentiary from 1850 to 1866.

A close friend of Maximilian II of Bavaria, von Wendland purchased the former monastery of Bernried in August 1852. He commissioned Bavarian architect Franz Effner to transform it into the "Schloss Bernried", which dominates the small town of Bernried on Lake Starnberg near Munich.
