= Vollrath von Maltzan =

Vollrath von Maltzan Freiherr von Wartenberg und Penzlin (22 December 1899 – 22 November 1967) was West German ambassador to France from 1955 to 1958.

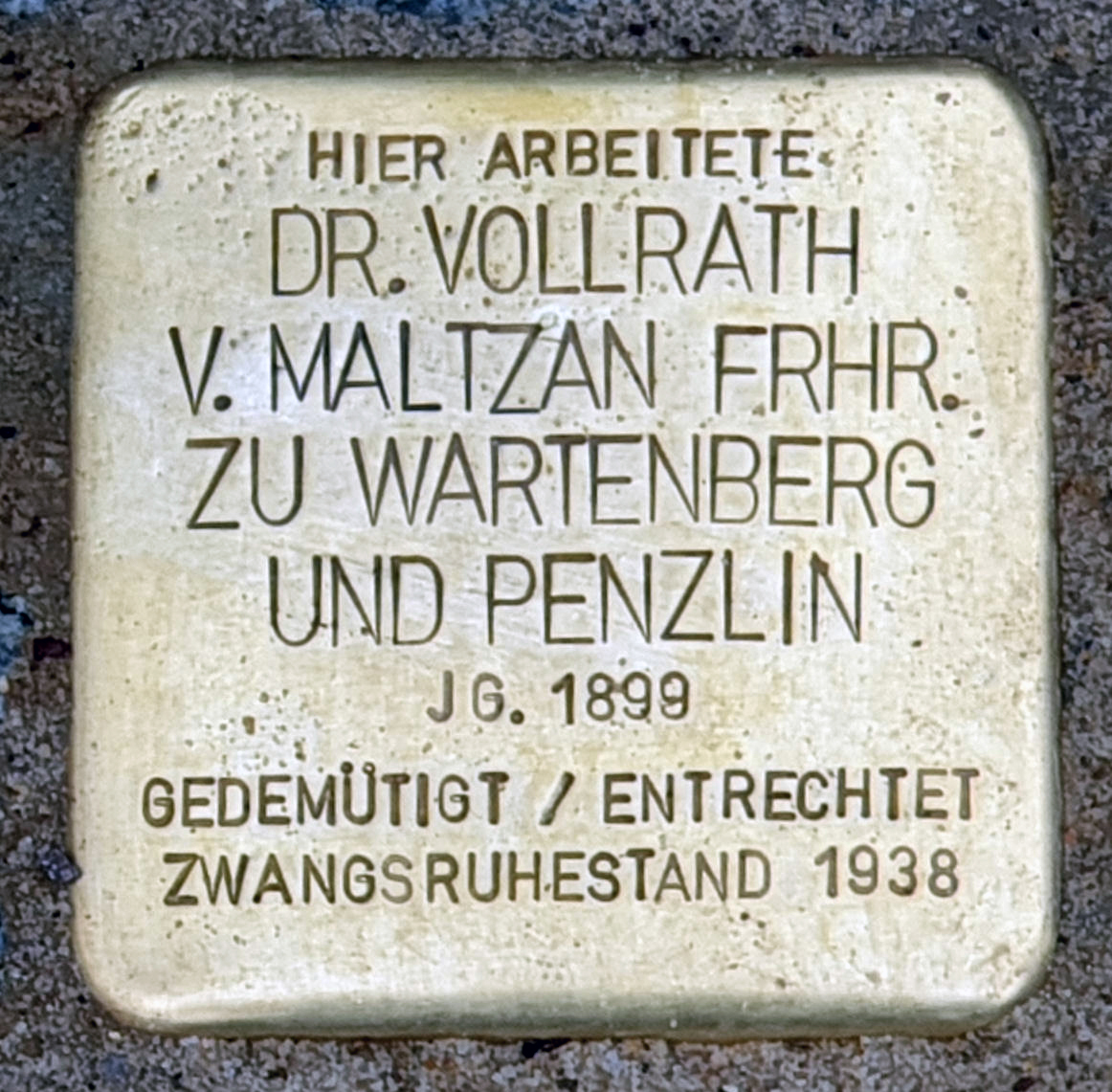
Vollrath von Maltzan

== Biography ==
Vollrath von Maltzan belonged to a long line of German nobility from Western Pomerania and Mecklenburg. His father left the Imperial German Army with the rank of captain, to manage his property in Odratzheim in Lower Alsace. His mother, Hermine née Rosenfeld, came from a middle-class background in Berlin. Vollrath von Maltzan went to school in Strasbourg, which then belonged to Germany. He served as an army officer in the First World War and then studied law at Heidelberg University He was granted a doctorate in 1922 and became an Assessor in Berlin. In 1925 he joined the German Foreign Office, where his second cousin Adolf Georg Baron von Maltzan, a former ambassador, was head of the Oriental Department. He attained the rank of consul in 1927 and was immediately appointed Secretary to the minister, Gustav Stresemann, the joint architect of the Franco-German rapprochement together with Aristide Briand. He was responsible for relations with the League of Nations in Geneva. In 1928–29, he was the German representative in Warsaw, and from the end of 1929 to the end of 1933 he was the German representative in Paris. He then worked at the Department of Economic Affairs at the Foreign Office until 1938, when he lost the position as his mother was Jewish. From 1942 to 1945, Maltzan was responsible for the commercial section of IG Farben.

After the Second World War, von Maltzan was made to attend a denazification board meeting along with Erica Pappritz. Both said that they had rejected Nazism. von Maltzan had been a member of the Nazi Party.

After the war, he headed the Foreign Trade Division of the Frankfurt Economic Administration. He later headed the Foreign Trade Division of the West German Economics Ministry before being loaned, and, in 1953 transferred permanently, to the Foreign Office. On 26 June 1952, he was commissioned by Walter Hallstein to prepare a report on problems at the Foreign Office. His report of 16 July 1952 detailed a number of problems, requiring reorganization and considerably higher staffing levels.

He ended his career as ambassador to Paris from 1955 to late 1958. Maltzan was a Francophile and spoke good French.

=== Publications ===
Vollrath von Maltzan wrote:

- Die Niessbrauch in Aktien (1923) ("Equitable interests in shares")
- Die Industrie im Kampf um dem Weltmarkt (1954) ("Industry in the struggle for the world market")

== Sources ==
- Maulucci, Thomas W. Jr. (2012). Adenauer's Foreign Office: West German Diplomacy in the Shadow of the Third Reich. Northern Illinois University Press. ISBN 978-1-60909-077-7.
