= Charles d'Albert, 1st Duke of Luynes =

French courtier (1578–1621), Constable of France

Charles d'Albert 1st Duke of Luynes
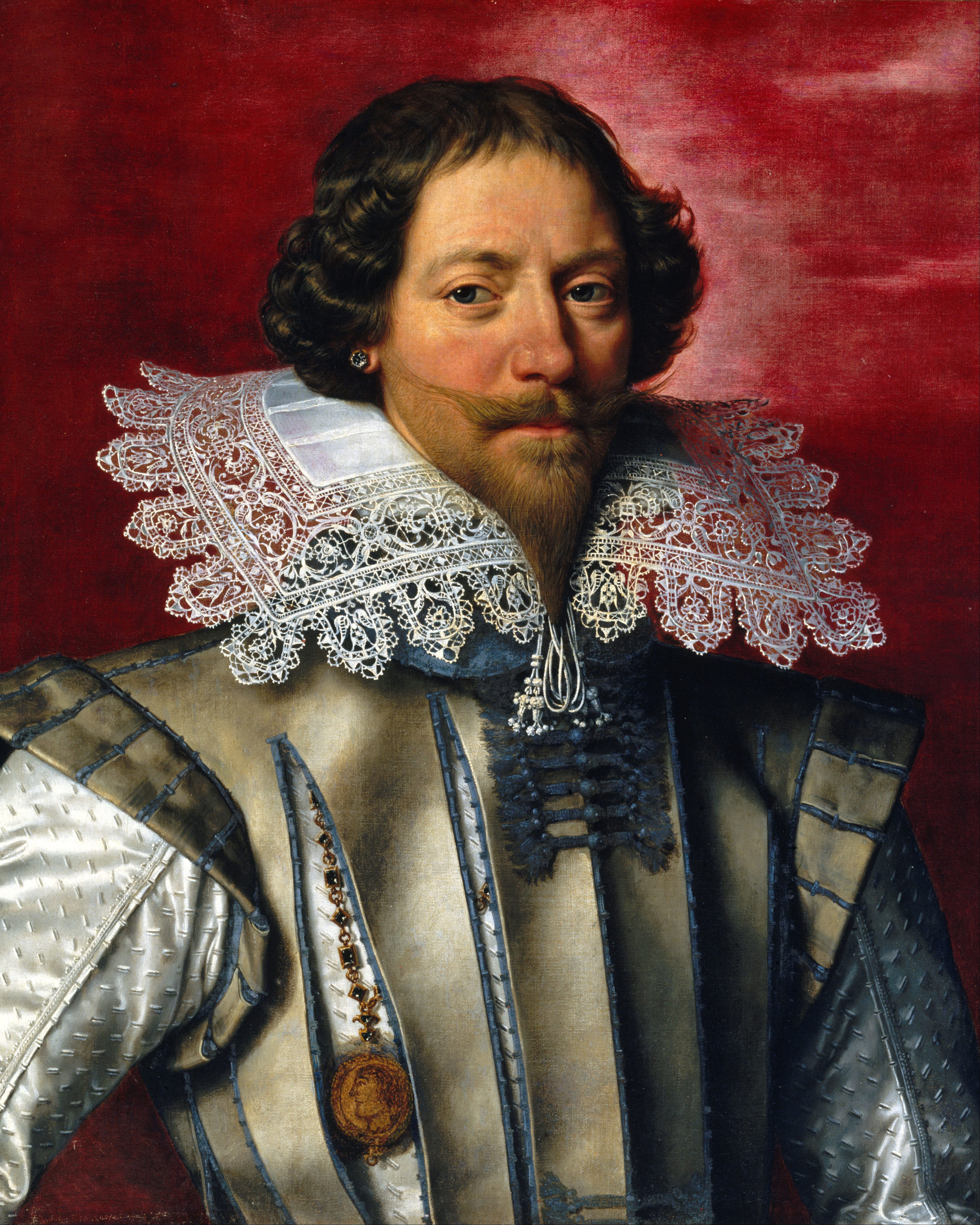
- Portrait of the 1st Duke of Luynes, by Frans Pourbus the Younger

Grand Constable of France
- In office 31 March 1621 – 15 December 1621
- Monarch: Louis XIII
- Preceded by: Henri I de Montmorency
- Succeeded by: François de Bonne, duc de Lesdiguières

Personal details
- Born: 5 August 1578 Kingdom of France
- Died: 15 December 1621 (aged 43) Château de Longueville, Guienne
- Cause of death: Scarlet fever
- Spouse: Marie de Rohan (m. 1617)
- Relations: Honoré d'Albert (brother); Antoinette d'Albert de Luynes (sister); Charles Honoré d'Albert, duc de Luynes (grandson); Jeanne Baptiste d'Albert de Luynes (granddaughter)
- Children: Louis Charles, Duke of Luynes
- Parents: Honoré d'Albert, seigneur of Luynes (father); Anne de Rodulf (mother)

Charles d'Albert, 1st Duke of Luynes (French: [ʃaʁl dalbɛʁ]; 5 August 1578 - 15 December 1621) was a French courtier and a favourite of Louis XIII. In 1619, the king made him Duke of Luynes and a Peer of France, and in 1621, Constable of France. Luynes died of scarlet fever near the end of that year at the height of his influence.

== Early life ==
He was the eldest son of Anne de Rodulf and Honoré d'Albert (1540–1592), seigneur de Luynes (in today's département Bouches-du-Rhône in Provence), who was in the service of the three last Valois kings and of Henri IV, the first Bourbon king. His brother Honoré d'Albert, 1st Duke of Chaulnes, was governor of Picardy and Marshal of France (1619), and defended his province successfully in 1625 and 1635. His sister Antoinette d'Albert de Luynes was a lady-in-waiting to the queen.

Charles was brought up at court and attended the dauphin, later Louis XIII. The king shared his fondness for hunting and rapidly advanced him in favour.

== Career ==
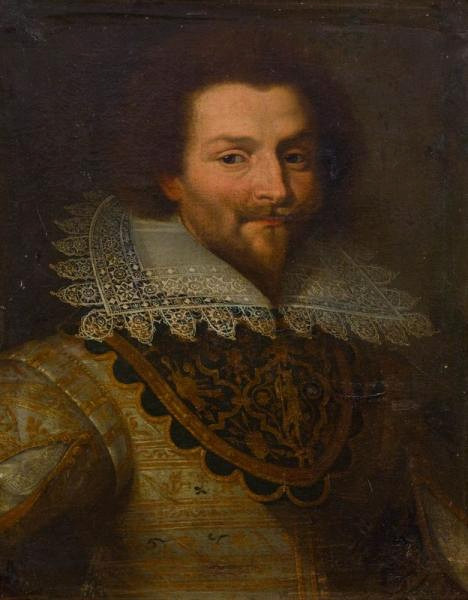
Portrait of the 1st Duke of Luynes, by Daniel Dumonstier, c. 1620.

In 1615, he was appointed commander of the Louvre Palace and counsellor, and the following year Grand Falconer of France. He used his influence over the king in the court intrigues against the queen-mother Marie de' Medici and her favourite Concini. It was Luynes who, with Vitry, captain of the guard, arranged the plot that ended in Concini's assassination in 1617, and secured all the latter's possessions in Italy and France.

Also in 1617, he was appointed captain of the Bastille and lieutenant-general of Normandy. He employed extreme measures against the pamphleteers of the time, but sought peace in Italy and with the Protestants.

In August 1619, he negotiated the Treaty of Angoulême by which Marie de' Medici was accorded complete liberty. The same month he was made governor of Picardy and Duke of Luynes. He had recently purchased the Comté de Maillé on the Loire, about 10 miles west of Tours, and the king erected Maillé into the Duchy of Luynes, which included about 50 parishes and extended to the western wall of Tours and around it on three sides. On 14 November 1619, he was officially received as a duke and a Peer of France at a ceremony in the great hall of the Parlement of Paris. His rapid rise to power made him a host of enemies, who looked upon him as but a second Concini. He suppressed an uprising of nobles in 1620.

=== 1621 expedition ===
In 1621, at the king's request, Luynes agreed to lead an expedition against the Protestants in the southwest, even though Luynes had for a long time been opposed to the campaign. As part of the agreement, Louis appointed him Constable of France, even though Luynes had slight military ability or achievement. He was sworn in on 2 April. Luynes received the post in part by default: the obvious choice, the Duke of Lesdiguières, was a Protestant and refused to abjure. Later, after Luynes's death, Lesdiguières converted and became constable. Luynes was involved in the failure of the Siege of Montauban (17 August – 2 November), for which he received much criticism, although he had not been the field commander. The Duke died of scarlet fever in December 1621 at Château de Longueville in the midst of the campaign.

== Personal life ==
In 1617, he married Princess Marie Aimée de Rohan, Mademoiselle de Montbazon (1600–1679), who was 22 years his junior, daughter of Hercule, Duke of Montbazon and, his first wife, Marie de Bretagne d'Avaugour. Together, they were the parents of:

- Louis Charles d'Albert de Luynes (1620–1690), 2nd Duke of Luynes who married Louise Marie Séguier, Marquise d'O (1629–1651). After her death, he married Princess Anne de Rohan-Montbazon (1640–1684), the younger half-sister of his mother from his grandfather's second marriage to Madeleine de Lenoncourt. After Anne's death in 1684, he married, thirdly, to Marguerite d'Aligre in 1685.

Luynes died of scarlet fever on 15 December 1621, aged 43, at Château de Longueville in Guienne. After his death, his widow remarried to Claude de Lorraine, Duke of Chevreuse (a son of Henry I, Duke of Guise), with whom she had three daughters. Upon Claude's death in 1655, the Chevreuse peerage became extinct and the duchy was sold to Marie. After her death on 12 August 1679, Louis-Charles, Marie's son from her marriage to the Duke of Luynes inherited the duchy of Chevreuse, and his descendants have held it since.

=== Descendants ===
Through his son Louis, he was posthumously a grandfather of six, including Charles Honoré d'Albert, duc de Luynes (1646–1712) and Jeanne Baptiste d'Albert de Luynes (1670–1736), best known today as the mistress of King Victor Amadeus II of Sardinia.

== Notes ==
French nobility
New creation	1st Duke of Luynes; 1619–1621	Succeeded by Louis Charles d'Albert
