= Conservatorship of Wendland =

- Supreme Court of California

Decided August 09, 2001
- Full case name: Conservatorship of the Person of Robert Wendland
- Citation(s): 26 Cal. 4th 519, 28 P.3d 151 (2001)

Holding
- A conservator may not withhold artificial nutrition and hydration (ANH) from a conservatee who is not terminally ill, comatose, or in a persistent vegetative state, and who has not left formal instructions for health care or appointed an agent for health care decisions unless the conservator has clear and convincing evidence that the decision to withhold ANH is in accordance with either the conservatee's own wishes or best interest.

Case opinions
- Majority: Werdegar, joined by George, C.J., Kennard, Baxter, Chin, and Brown

In 2001, in the case Conservatorship of Wendland, also known as Wendland v. Wendland, and the Robert Wendland case, the Supreme Court of California unanimously ruled that Rose Wendland, the wife of Robert Wendland, in the absence of a durable power of attorney for health care (DPAHC), did not have the authority to withhold artificial nutrition and hydration in her husband's behalf. The Court recognized that patients unable to make a decision for themselves should receive special protection according to the right to life and right to privacy provided by the California constitution.

== Background ==
In 1993, Robert Wendland became permanently physically and mentally disabled after being severely injured in an automobile accident. After spending 16 months in a coma, Robert Wendland emerged with severe cognitive impairment, being unable to "swallow, control his bowels or bladder, communicate verbally or nonverbally, or act volitionally," but he was able to react to simple commands with much repetitive coaching. Robert's wife and children also believed that he was unable to recognize them.

Two years later, after being informed by Robert's physicians that Robert had no reasonable chance of improvement, his wife, Rose, and children requested that Robert's physicians to remove the feeding tube and allow Robert to die. According to Rose and Robert's brother, who had both spoken to Robert before his accident about living on life support or being kept alive through a feeding tube, Robert would not have wanted to live under those conditions.

This decision was challenged by Robert's mother, Florence, who sued Rose in order to prevent the removal of the feeding tube from her son, and the lawsuit lasted for six years until the decision by the California Supreme Court in 2001. Rose Wendland claimed Robert was estranged from his mother, but that was not true. Robert maintained a relationship with her without Rose's knowledge, and she visited him regularly in the hospital long after Rose and their three children stopped visiting Robert altogether.

== The Court's decision ==
The trial court held that the conservator, Rose Wendland, had to prove by clear and convincing evidence that removing the feeding tube would have been what Robert Wendland wanted or that it would have been in his best interest. The Court of Appeal for the Third District reversed; the California Supreme Court reversed, upholding the trial court. A previous California case had held that a conservator could withhold artificial nutrition and hydration from a patient in a persistent vegetative state; the Wendland court saw that situation as significantly different from that of a patient who is conscious but incompetent, because the latter might perceive the effects of starvation and dehydration. The Court also distinguished between an agent designated by the patient and a conservator appointed by a court; the former could be assumed to reliably represent the patient's wishes, but the same could not necessarily be assumed for the latter. Because of this—and because of the serious consequences of the decision—the Court required the high standard of proof from a conservator in order to protect a person's right to life and right to privacy provided by Article I, Section 1 of the California constitution. The Court noted that the majority of health-care decisions require only preponderance of the evidence, the normal standard in civil cases.

On several occasions, Robert had allegedly told Rose and others that he would not want to live like a "vegetable". The trial court concluded that these statements did not rise to clear and convincing evidence; the Supreme Court agreed. Law professor Lawrence Nelson, counsel for Rose Wendland, believed that these statements did provide a preponderance of the evidence, and suggested that had Robert given Rose power of attorney for health care, the Court would have respected Rose's decision to remove Robert's feeding tube.

The Court did not address the requirements when there is no advance directive, agent, surrogate, or conservator. An article in the Western Journal of Medicine discussed this situation, and the two authors disagreed on the required standard of proof. Attorney Jon Eisenberg, who submitted an amicus curiae brief in support of Rose and Robert Wendland, believed that the Court plainly intended its opinion to apply narrowly to the question before it, so that in such circumstances, physicians may withdraw life-sustaining treatment at the direction of family or friends who can show by preponderance of the evidence that this would coincide with the patient's wishes. But Eisenberg's co-author, law professor Clark Kelso, believed that the opinion's reasoning compels the conclusion that clear and convincing evidence is required.

== See also ==
- Cases from Supreme Court of California
- Euthanasia in the United States
- Terri Schiavo case
