= Ramholz Castle =

Castle in Germany

Coordinates: 50.3324°N 9.6124°E

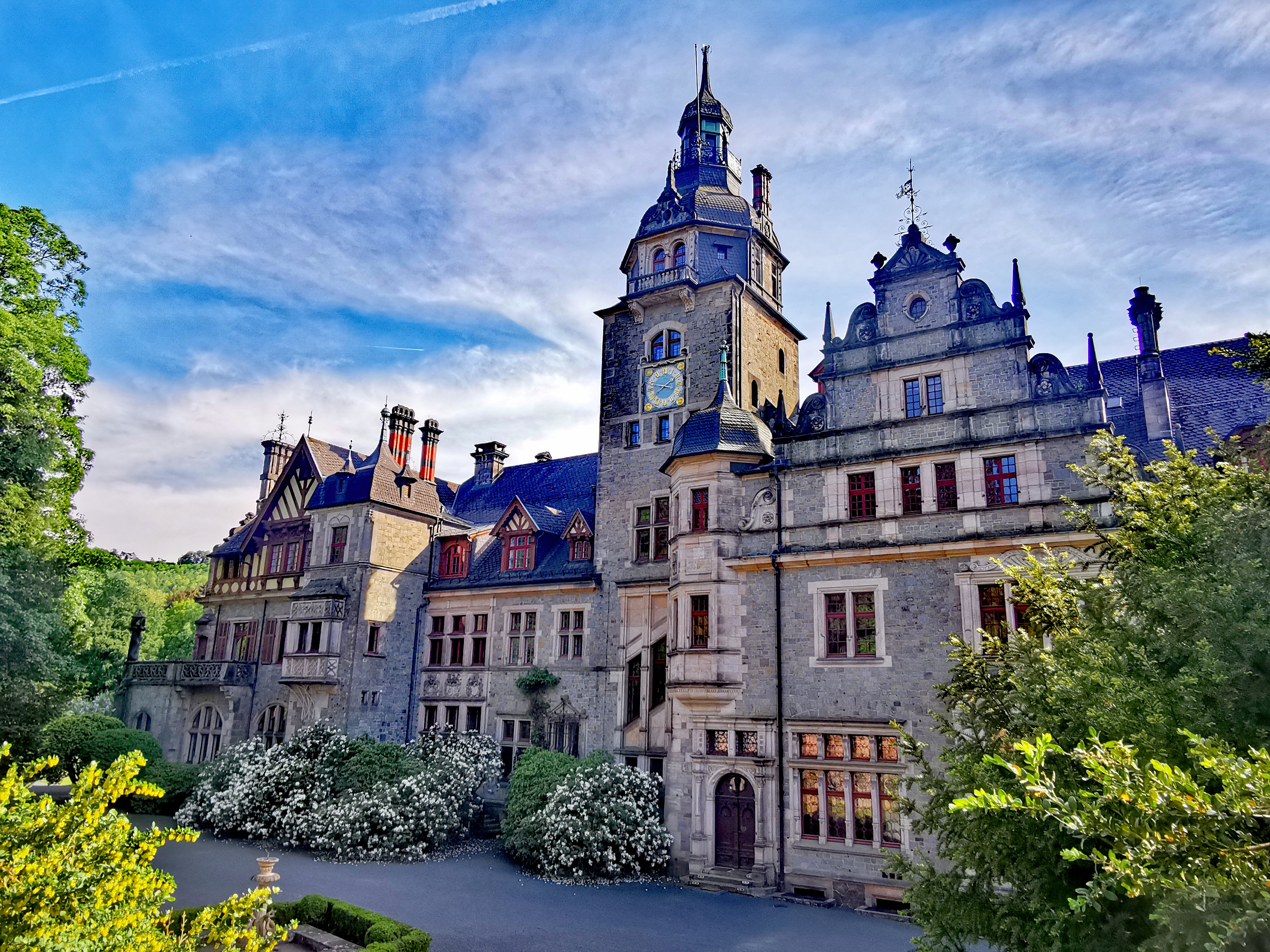
Ramholz Castle, seen from the north, 2022

Ramholz Castle (German: Schloss Ramholz) is a German castle located in the hamlet of Ramholz in the Vollmerz district of the town of Schlüchtern, around 40 kilometres southwest of Fulda. The castle and park are cultural monuments according to the Hessian Monument Protection Act.

== History ==
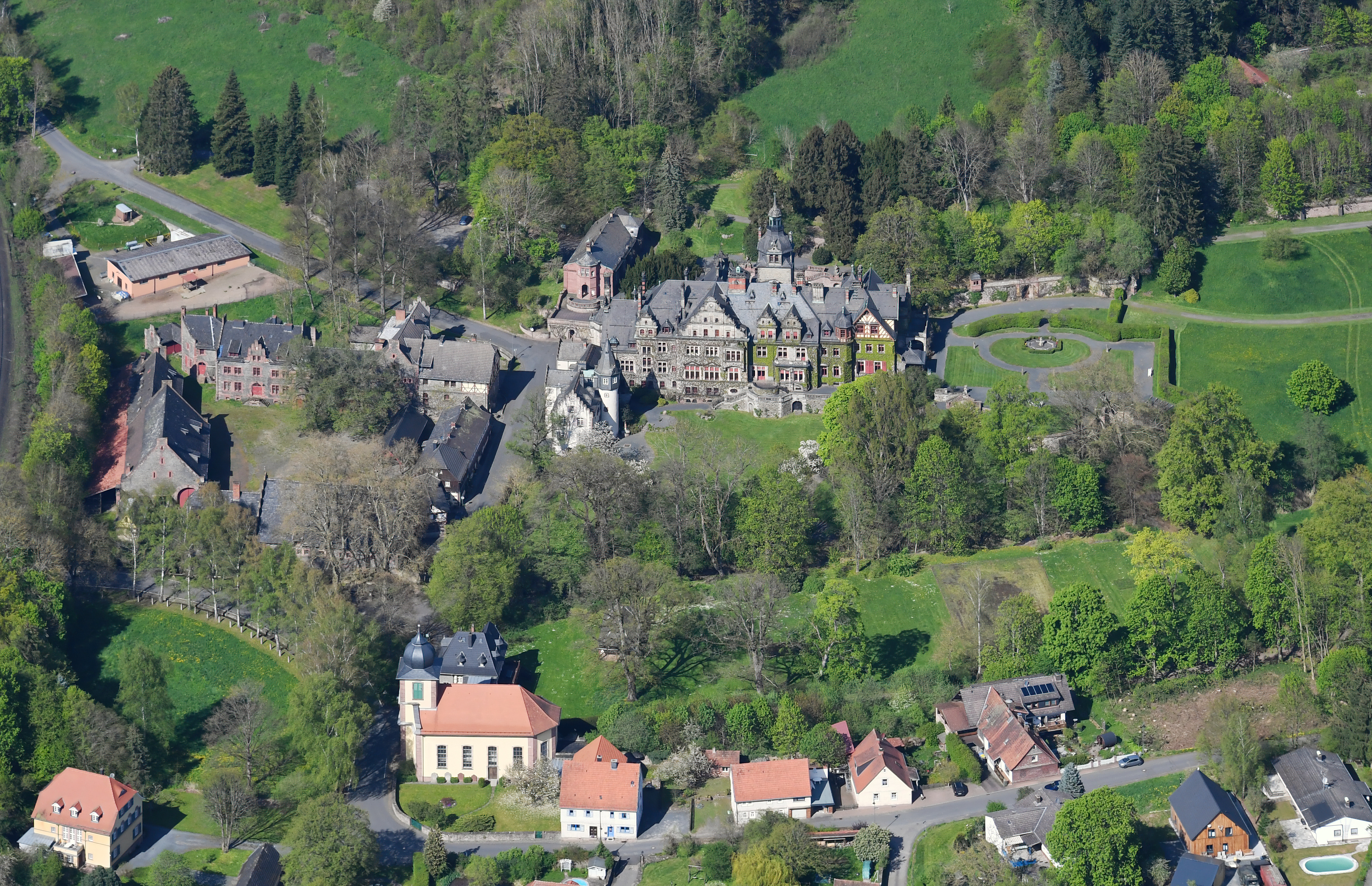
Aerial shot of Ramholz (view from the southwest), 2023

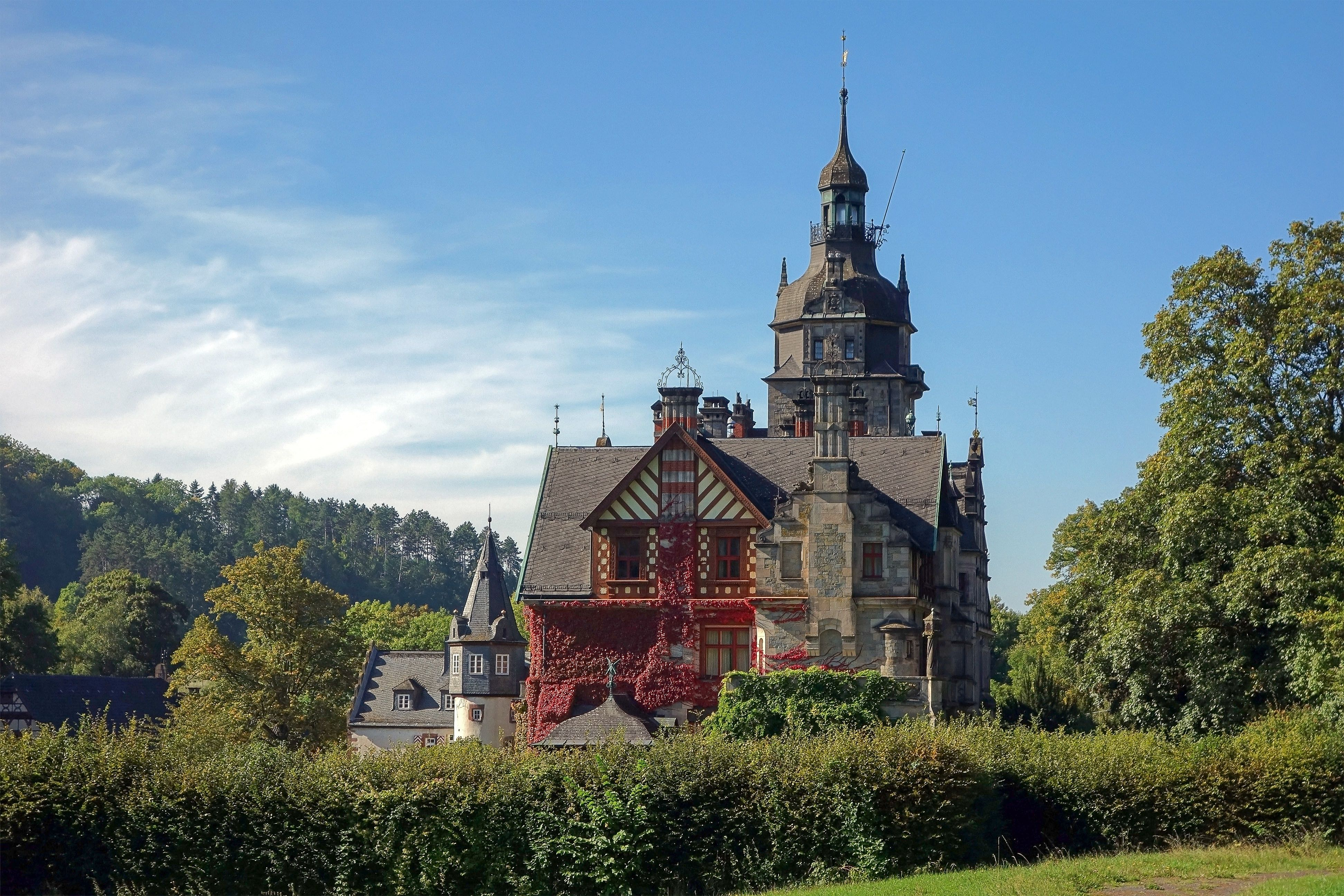
Ramholz, 2013

Ramholz was first mentioned in 1167 as the manor (curia) of the baronial line of Hermann von Steckelberg. Upon the fall of the Lords of Steckelberg at the beginning of the 14th century, their properties were divided among six heirs, including the Ulrich von Hutten. In 1501, a new building, called the "Old Castle", was built there as the residence of the von Hutten family, who had owned the complex since 1482. The Hutten castle is preserved as part of Ramholz Castle and has architectural features such as stepped gables and a stair tower. By 1642, Philipp Daniel von Hutten (d. 1687) owned all the Hutten estates but was forced by financial difficulties caused by war to mortgage his properties in Ramholz and Vollmerz to his brother-in-law, Casimir Carl von Landas. When von Landas died without issue, his father, the Electoral Palatinate Church Council President Carl von Landas, inherited the property which passed to his brother, Johann Friedrich von Landas, Electoral Palatinate and Privy Councilor. After his death in 1677, the property passed to his daughter Amalie (née von Landas), wife of Baron Maximilian von Degenfeld. In 1698, the Counts of Degenfeld inherited the property. They held it until 1852 when Counts August Christoph, Gustav Christoph and Adolf von Degenfeld sold the castle and 1,800 hectares (4,400 acres) to Prince Ernst Casimir of Ysenburg and Büdingen of the House of Ysenburg-Büdingen.

=== Stumm ownership ===
In 1883 Hugo Rudolf Stumm (later ennobled as Baron von Stumm-Ramholz in 1888) acquired the estate and purchased the ruins of Steckelberg Castle to protect them from further decay. Stumm had become very wealthy as a silent partner in the Stumm Brothers company and, in competition with his brothers, Carl Ferdinand von Stumm-Halberg and Ferdinand Eduard von Stumm, who also had magnificent castles built (Halberg Castle and Rauischholzhausen Castle, respectively), greatly improved upon the ruins and existing manor house. Between 1893 and 1896, Baron von Stumm had Munich architects, and brothers, Emanuel and Gabriel von Seidl add a new building to the existing castle, as well as a farm yard incorporating buildings from the 18th century and houses for the employees and a power house to power the property. The grounds were designed by Swedish garden artist Jöns Persson Lindahl. The castle combined elements of Gothic, Renaissance, Baroque, Classicism and Art Nouveau architecture. The former orangery housed a restaurant from 1997 to 2014.

The castle, which was privately owned by Kühlmann-Stumm's descendants, was opened to the public for guided tours in 2012 before it was offered for sale for €7 million. In 2014 the 115 room castle was acquired by a Chinese investor.

== List of owners ==
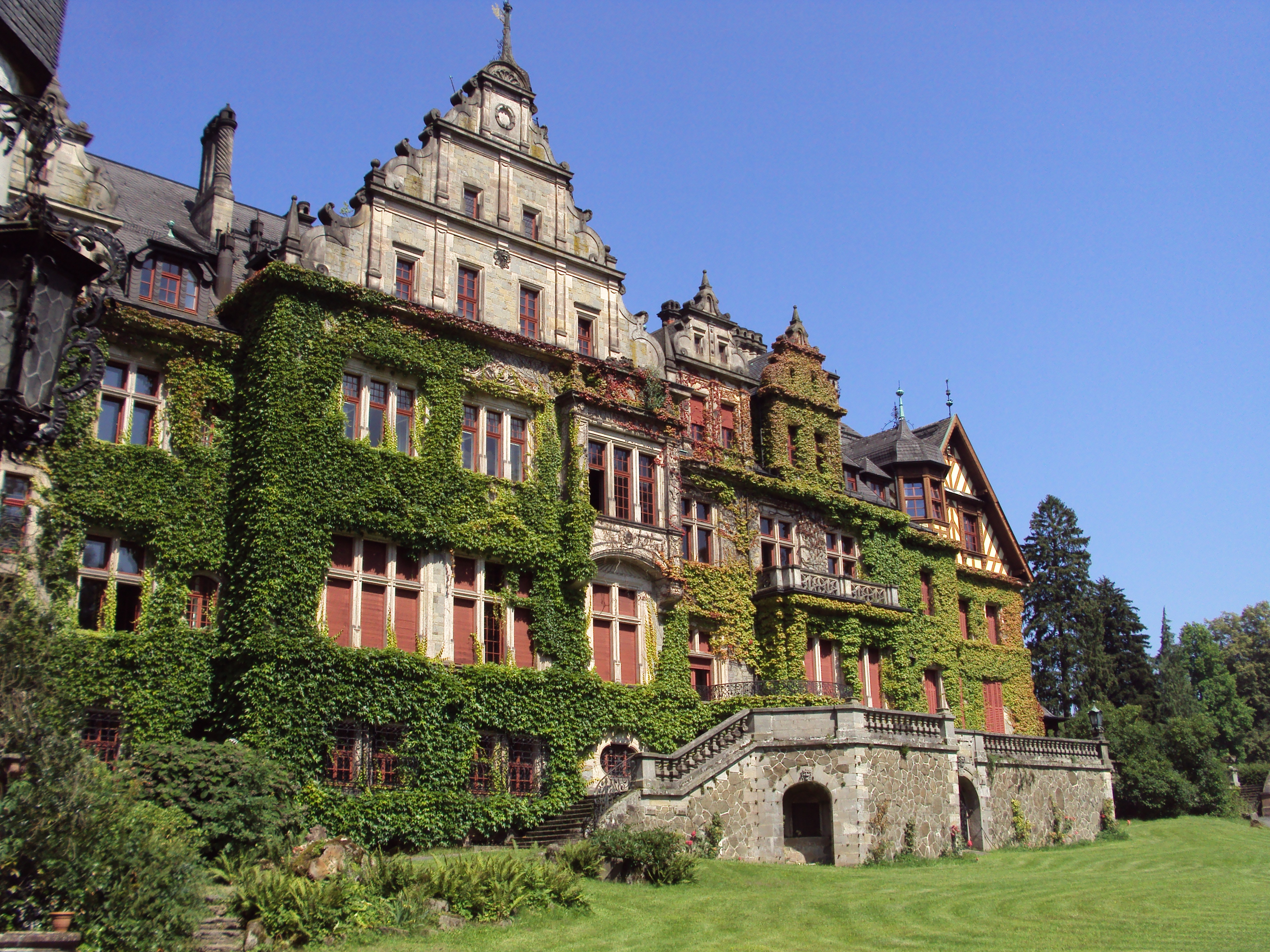
Ramholz, 2012

- 1482–1698: von Hutten family
- 1698–1790: Counts of Degenfeld
- 1790–1883: House of Ysenburg-Büdingen
- 1883–1910: Hugo Rudolf von Stumm-Ramholz
- 1910–1917: Marguerite von Kühlmann, Baroness von Stumm-Ramholz (daughter of Hugo Rudolf von Stumm-Ramholz)
- 1917–1977: Knut von Kühlmann-Stumm (son of Marguerite von Stumm-Ramholz)
- 1977–1997: Jutta von Stumm-Ramholz (widow of Knut von Kühlmann-Stumm)
- 1997–2008: Magnus von Kühlmann (son of Knut von Kühlmann-Stumm)
- 2008–2014: Maximilian von Kühlmann (son of Magnus von Kühlmann)
- Since 2014: Entrepreneur from Shanghai, China.

== See also ==
- Steckelberg Castle
