= Hugo Rudolf von Stumm =

German industrialist, landowner and Prussian cavalry officer

Hugo Rudolf Christian, Freiherr von Stumm-Ramholz (né Stumm; 23 December 1845 – 31 July 1910) was a German industrialist, landowner, member of the state parliament and Prussian cavalry officer. He commissioned Ramholz Castle, built near Schlüchtern from 1893 to 1896.

== Early life ==
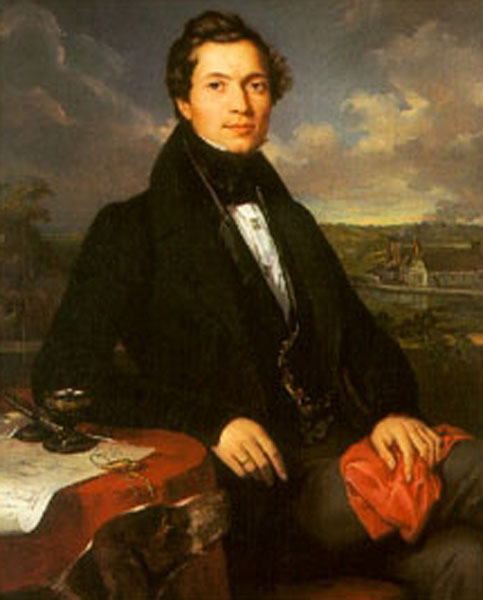
Portrait of his father, Carl Friedrich Stumm, by Louis Krevel, 1836.

Stumm was born on 23 December 1845 in Neunkircher. He was the youngest son of Marie Louise Böcking and Carl Friedrich Stumm (1798–1848), who killed himself during the economic crisis of the 1840s and who had run the family company as sole owner since the 1835 death of his grandfather, Friedrich Philipp Stumm. His elder brothers were Carl Ferdinand Stumm (later ennobled as Baron von Stumm-Halberg in 1888) and diplomat Ferdinand Eduard Stumm (later ennobled as Baron von Stumm).

His paternal grandparents were Friedrich Philipp Stumm and Maria Elisabeth Geib. His maternal grandparents were Bernhard Richard Böcking and Catherine Friederike Christiane Claus.

Beginning in 1864, he attended secondary school in Trier, graduating with a certificate of maturity.

== Career ==
Stumm came from a family of entrepreneurs who bought the Neunkircher ironworks and shares in other ironworks in Saarland in 1806. While his older brother Carl took over the management of the ironworks, Hugo and Ferdinand benefited from the profits of the family business as silent partners. In 1908, Hugo was one of the 100 richest citizens in the Kingdom of Prussia with an estimated fortune of 14 to 15 million marks and annual income of 1 million marks.

Beginning in 1874, Hugo served as a Prussian cavalry officer in the 1st Westphalian Hussar Regiment, No. 8 (in the VII Corps, of which Emperor Nicholas II of Russia was Colonel-in-chief) and then in the 1st Hessian Hussar Regiment, No. 13 (in the XI Corps, of which King Umberto I of Italy was Colonel-in-chief). Stumm retired from active military service in 1883 with the rank of Captain.

From 1894 to 1897, Hugo was an elected member of the Kassel Municipal Parliament (for the Kassel Administrative District) and the Hesse-Nassau Provincial Parliament.

=== Schloss Ramholz ===
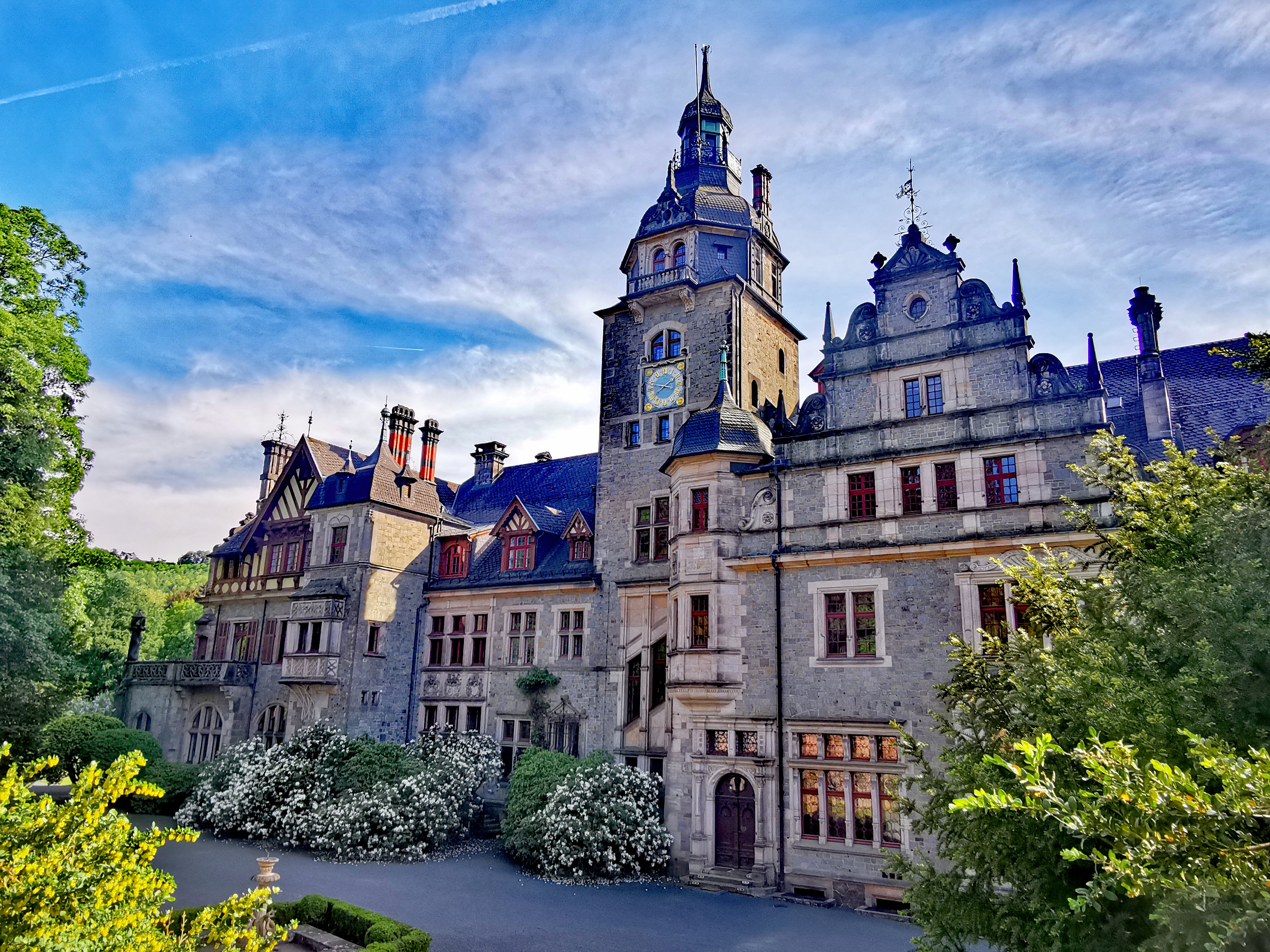
Ramholz Castle

In 1883 Stumm acquired the estate of Ramholz, including the ruined Steckelberg Castle, in the hamlet of Ramholz in the Vollmerz district of the town of Schlüchtern, from the Ysenburg-Büdingen family. Between 1893 and 1896, Baron von Stumm had Munich architects, and brothers, Emanuel and Gabriel von Seidl add a new building to the existing castle, as well as a farm yard incorporating buildings from the 18th century and houses for the employees and a power house to power the property. The Ramholz manor encompassed 979 hectares (2,420 acres).

== Personal life ==
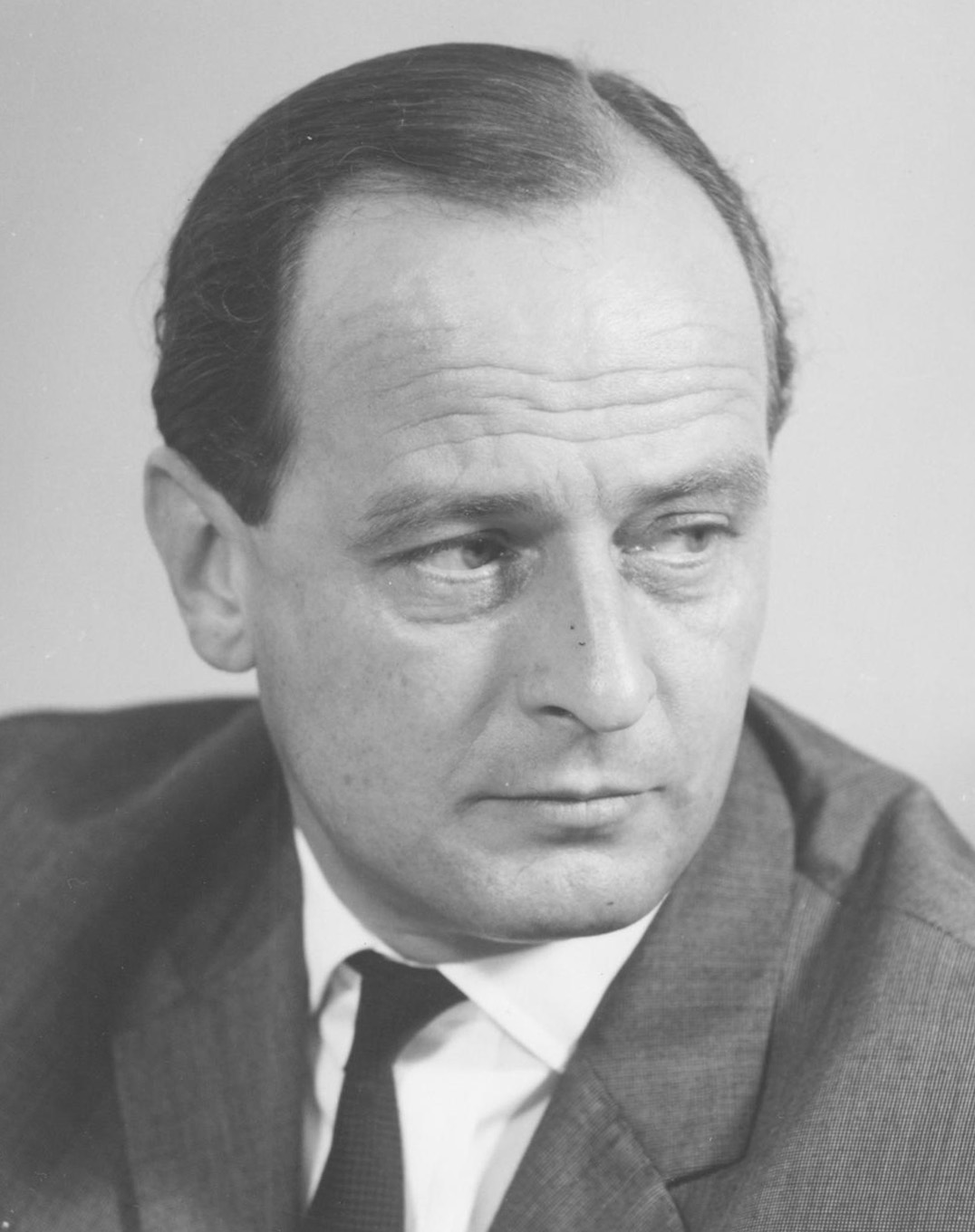
His grandson, Baron Knut von Kühlmann-Stumm

On 29 September 1882, Stumm married Ludovica von Rauch (5 January 1866 – 27 July 1945), daughter of the Imperial and Royal Colonel Adalbert von Rauch (a son of Maj.-Gen. Leopold von Rauch of the Prussian Army) (Note: Leopold von Rauch (1787–1860) was a son of Maj.-Gen. Bonaventura von Rauch. His brothers included Gustav (future Minister for War) and Friedrich Wilhelm (future military attaché in St. Petersburg and adjutant general to King Frederick William IV). Leopold's sister Rosalie von Rauch married Prince Albert of Prussia (brother to King Frederick William IV and Emperor William I).) and his wife Ludovika von Blittersdorff (a daughter of Friedrich von Blittersdorf). Ludovica was close to many well-known artists, including impressionist Robert Sterl, portrait painter Philip de László, sculptor Ferdinand Seeboeck, and painter Felix Muche (father of Georg Muche). Together, Hugo and Ludovica were the parents of:

- Baroness Margarethe von Stumm-Ramholz (1884–1917), who married Richard von Kühlmann, State Secretary for Foreign Affairs, who was Ambassador to the Ottoman Empire and the Netherlands, in 1906.
- Baron Hugo von Stumm-Ramholz (1887–1910), who died unmarried in Helwan, Egypt.
- Baroness Helga von Stumm-Ramholz (1892–1914), who married Bavarian treasurer Eberhard von Tattenbach, in 1912.

Baron von Stumm-Ramholz died on 31 July 1910, in Coswig, Saxony as a result of a riding accident. As his son predeaceased him, the barony became extinct but his daughter, Margarethe, was created a baroness in her own right, as Baroness Kühlmann-Stumm, by the Emperor. After his death, Margarethe inherited Ramholz Castle. Upon her death, it was inherited by her son, politician and industrialist Knut von Kühlmann-Stumm (1916-1977), whose widow owned it until her death in 1997.

=== Mental illness ===
Hugo suffered from mental illness that manifested itself in outbreaks as early as 1864 and was treated in Bendorf in 1867. An outbreak in 1888 led to his incapacitation by the Schlüchtern district court on 5 November 1888. At that time, he was temporarily placed in the Friedrichsberg Sanatorium near Hamburg. The guardianship was held by Hugo's brother Ferdinand, who was the German ambassador in Madrid at the time (who was represented by their eldest brother Carl). After the illness broke out again in 1896, a psychiatric report indicated he would inclined to squander large sums of money and may resort to violent behavior, he was committed to the Lindenhof Asylum in Coswig near Dresden from May 1896 until the end of his life.
