= Rauischholzhausen Castle =

German castle

Coordinates: 50.7564°N 8.8817°E

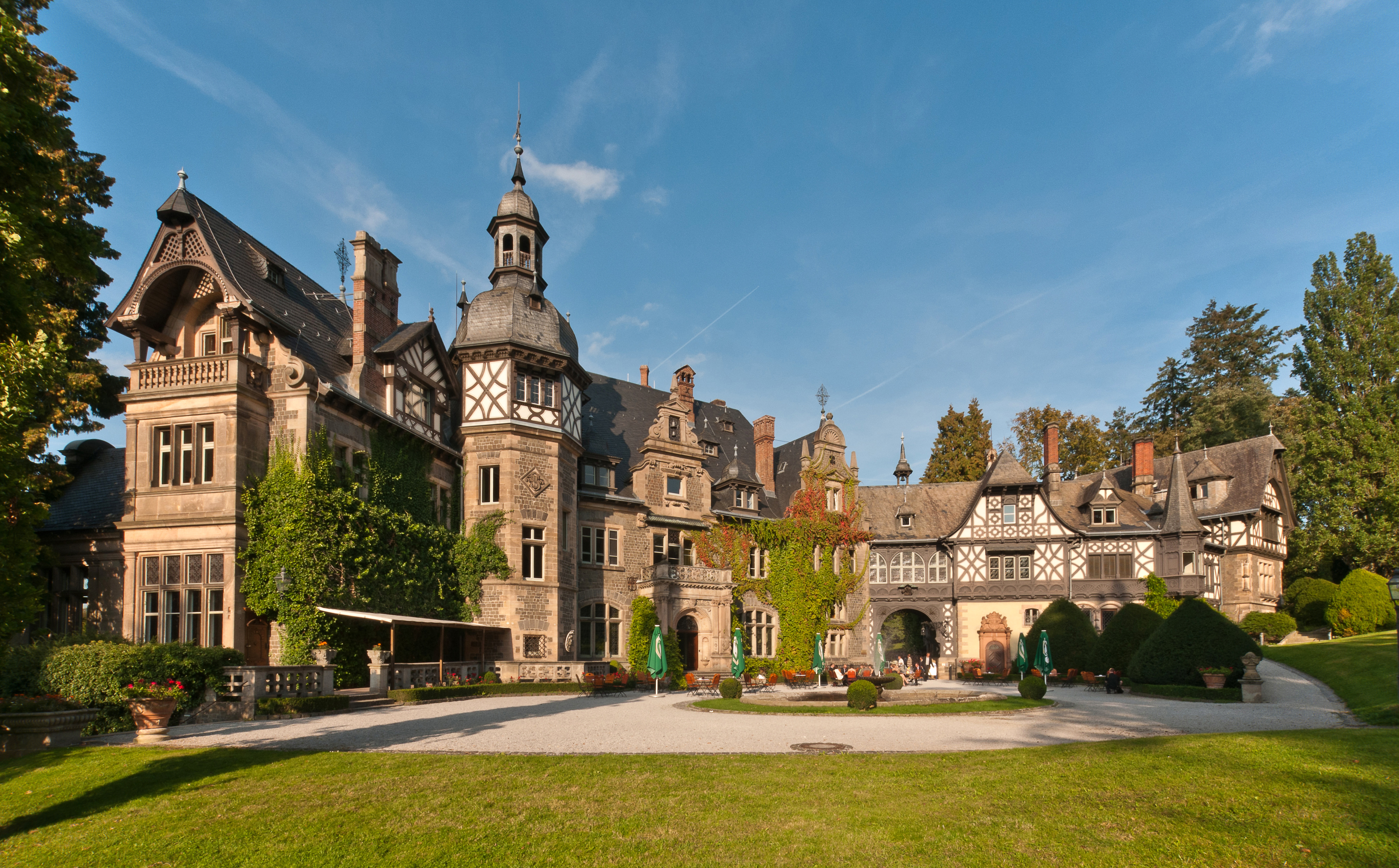
Rauischholzhausen Castle, 2011

Rauischholzhausen Castle (German: Schloss Rauischholzhausen) is a German castle located on the outskirts of Rauischholzhausen, a village in Ebsdorfergrund in the southeast of Marburg-Biedenkopf district in Hesse. Today, the castle belongs to the University of Giessen, which uses it as a conference facility. The castle is surrounded by the 32-hectare (79-acre) Rauischholzhausen Castle Park, an English landscape garden that was created together with the construction of the castle between 1871 and 1876.

== History ==
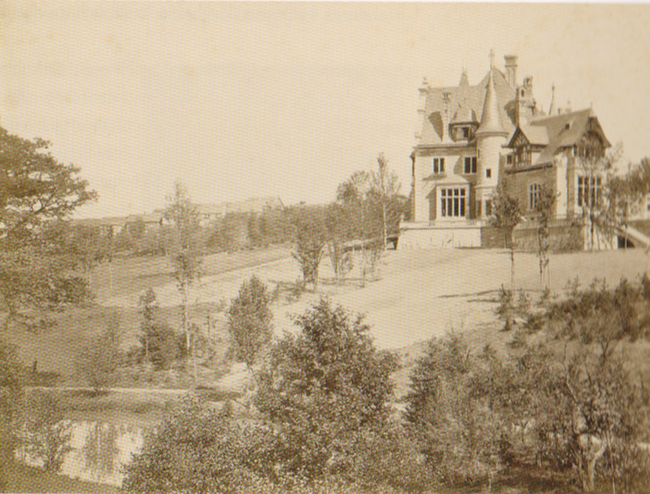
The old Rauischholzhausen Castle, 1870

In c. 1873, after 500-years of ownership by the Rau von Holzhausen family, the industrialist and diplomat Ferdinand Eduard Stumm (1843–1925), later ennobled as Baron von Stumm, bought the property which included 1,900 fields of meadows and forest areas. The last Lord Rau von Holzhausen as an officer in the Hessian Army and when Hesse-Kassel became part of Prussia during German unification, he refused to join the Prussian Army and sold all his property to Stumm, the ambassador's delegate, and moved out of Germany shortly thereafter.

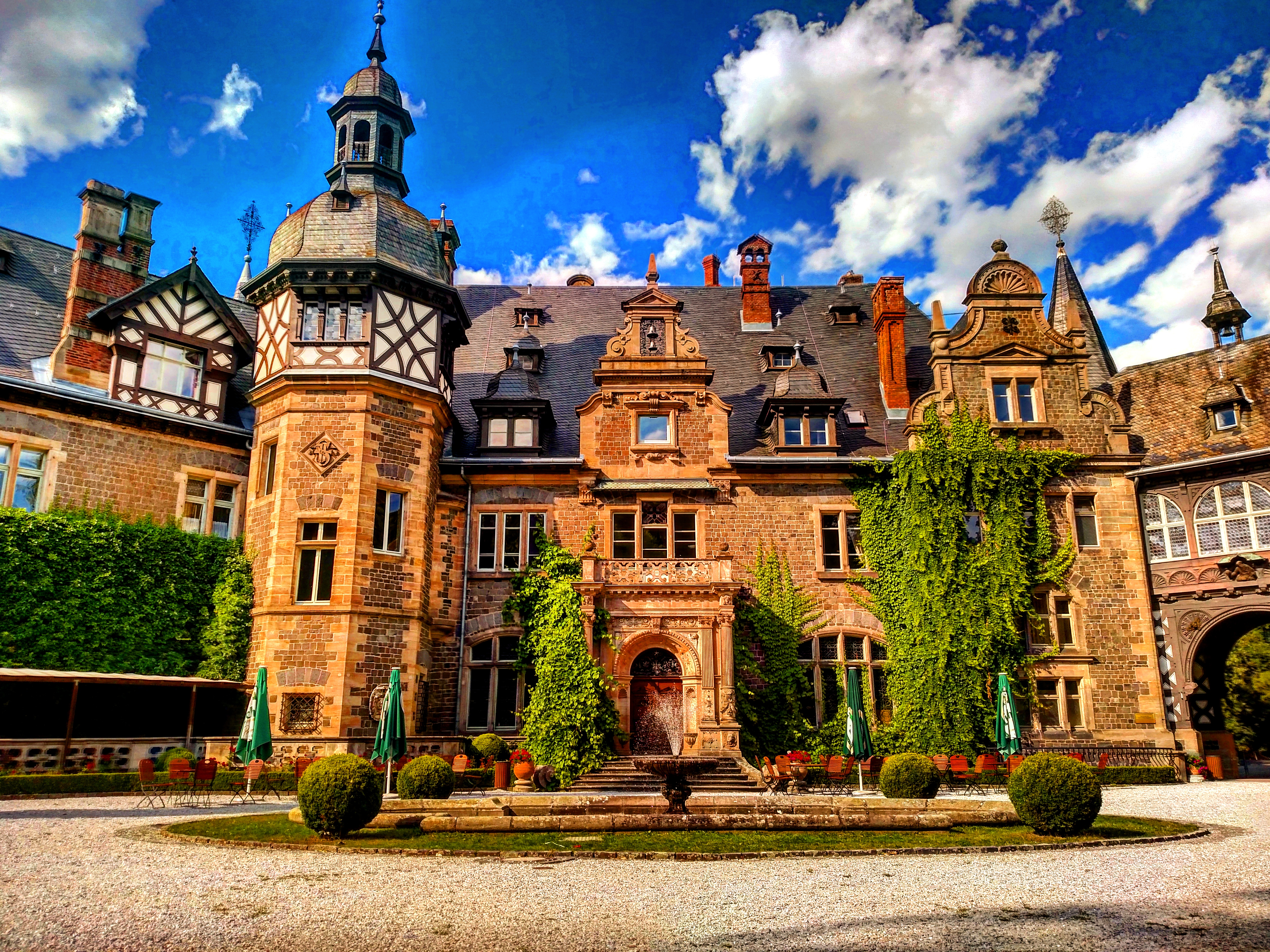
Front of the castle, 2016

After taking over ownership, Stumm commenced construction activity on the estate by demolishing the old moated castle, the adjacent farm and the tithe barn. On the hill behind it, Stumm built a new manor house, called Rauischholzhausen Castle, and nearby farm yard. Architect Carl Schäfer was commissioned to design the castle in the style of Klein-Potsdam, and the park was designed by Heinrich Siesmayer, the creator of the Frankfurt Palmengarten. Construction took place between 1871 and 1878, however, the building collapsed in 1873, because of poor foundation work. Carl Jonas Mylius and Alfred Friedrich Bluntschli (students of Gottfried Semper), were hired to redesign the castle in line with Schaefer's original designs. Construction of the roof and the south-east wing was completed in 1875 and the main building was completed a year later with the half-timbered section of the building completed in 1878.

Stumm had become very wealthy as a partner in the Stumm Brothers company and, in competition with his brothers, Carl Ferdinand von Stumm-Halberg and Hugo Rudolf von Stumm, who also had magnificent castles built (Halberg Castle and Ramholz Castle, respectively), the park and the castle were built to impress.

In 1937, Stumm's son Ferdinand Carl von Stumm, who had also been in the diplomatic service until 1918 and had been Lord of the Castle since his father's death in 1925, sold the manor, castle and park. The castle was bought by the Kerkhoff Foundation in Bad Nauheim and then leased to the University of Giessen as a site for experiments in agriculture. The forest was sold to Herr von Waldhausen, while the castle and the park were made available to the public. In the castle, a school was formed to train kindergarten teachers.

=== Present day ===
After having been confiscated as Nazi property by the Allied Forces in 1945, the castle and the park became property of the State of Hesse and in 1949, the University of Giessen acquired the castle and have been using it as a conference and training center ever since. The Hesse Department of Agriculture - Rauischholzhausen Educational Seminar is also housed at the castle.

== See also ==
- Rau von Holzhausen
