= Carl Ferdinand von Stumm-Halberg =

Prussian mining industrialist and politician (1836–1901)

Carl Ferdinand von Stumm-Halberg Baron von Stumm-Halberg
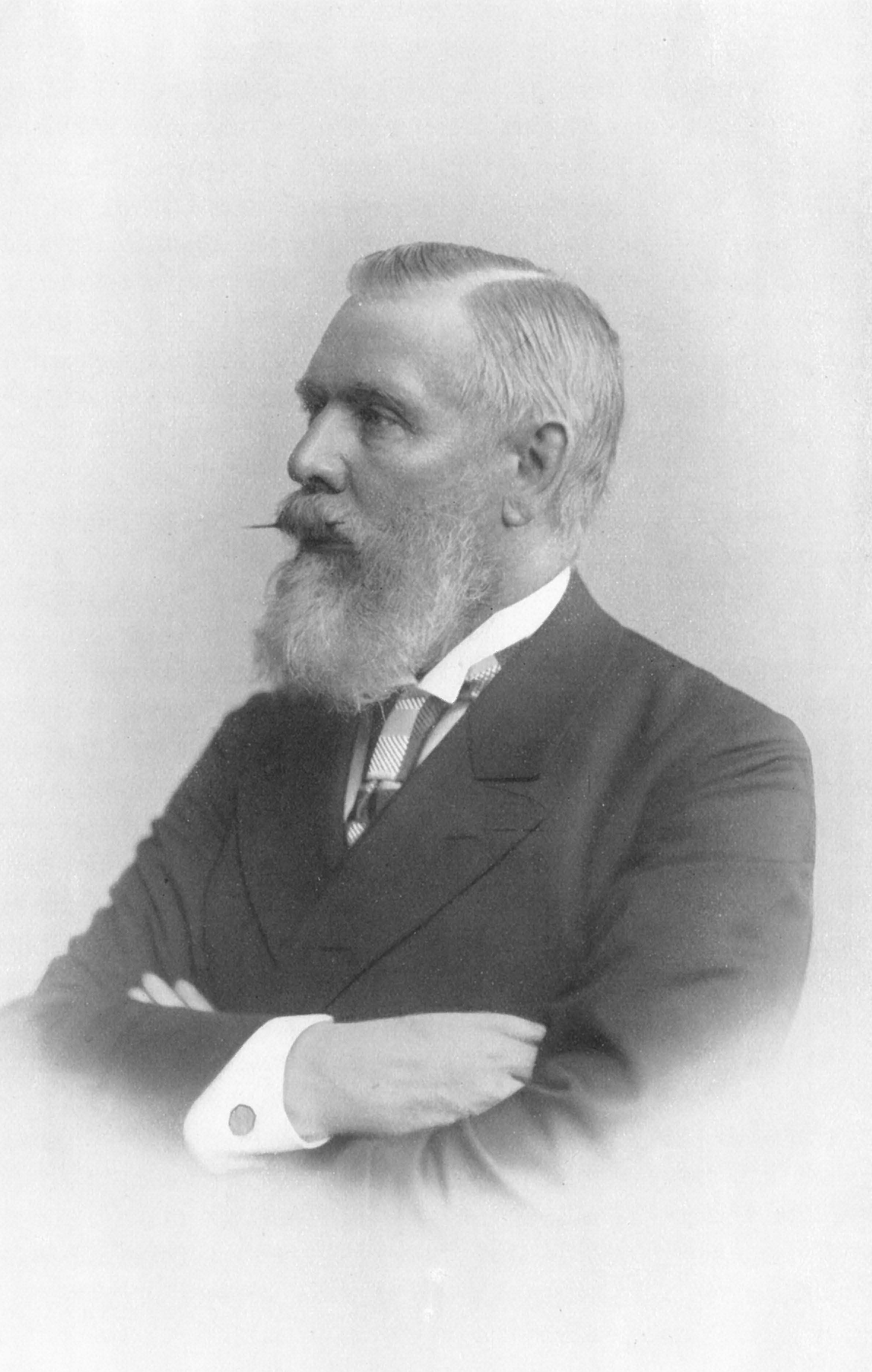
- Photograph of Baron von Stumm-Halberg, 1890s
- Born: Carl Ferdinand Stumm; 30 March 1836; Saarbrücken, Kingdom of Prussia
- Died: 8 March 1901 (aged 64); Saarbrücken, German Empire
- Children: 5
- Parents: Carl Friedrich Stumm (father); Marie Louise Böcking (mother)
- Relatives: Hugo Rudolf von Stumm (brother); Ferdinand von Stumm (brother); Ferdinand Carl von Stumm (nephew)
- Awards: Iron Cross; Order of the Red Eagle; Order of the Crown; House Order of Hohenzollern; Order of Leopold

Carl Ferdinand, Freiherr von Stumm-Halberg (né Stumm; 30 March 1836 – 8 March 1901) was a Prussian mining industrialist and Free Conservative politician. As a Privy Councilor of Commerce, baron, member of the Prussian House of Representatives, member of the Reichstag and founding chairman of the German Reich Party, he was one of the most influential men in Prussia and one of the richest people in the German Empire.

== Early life ==
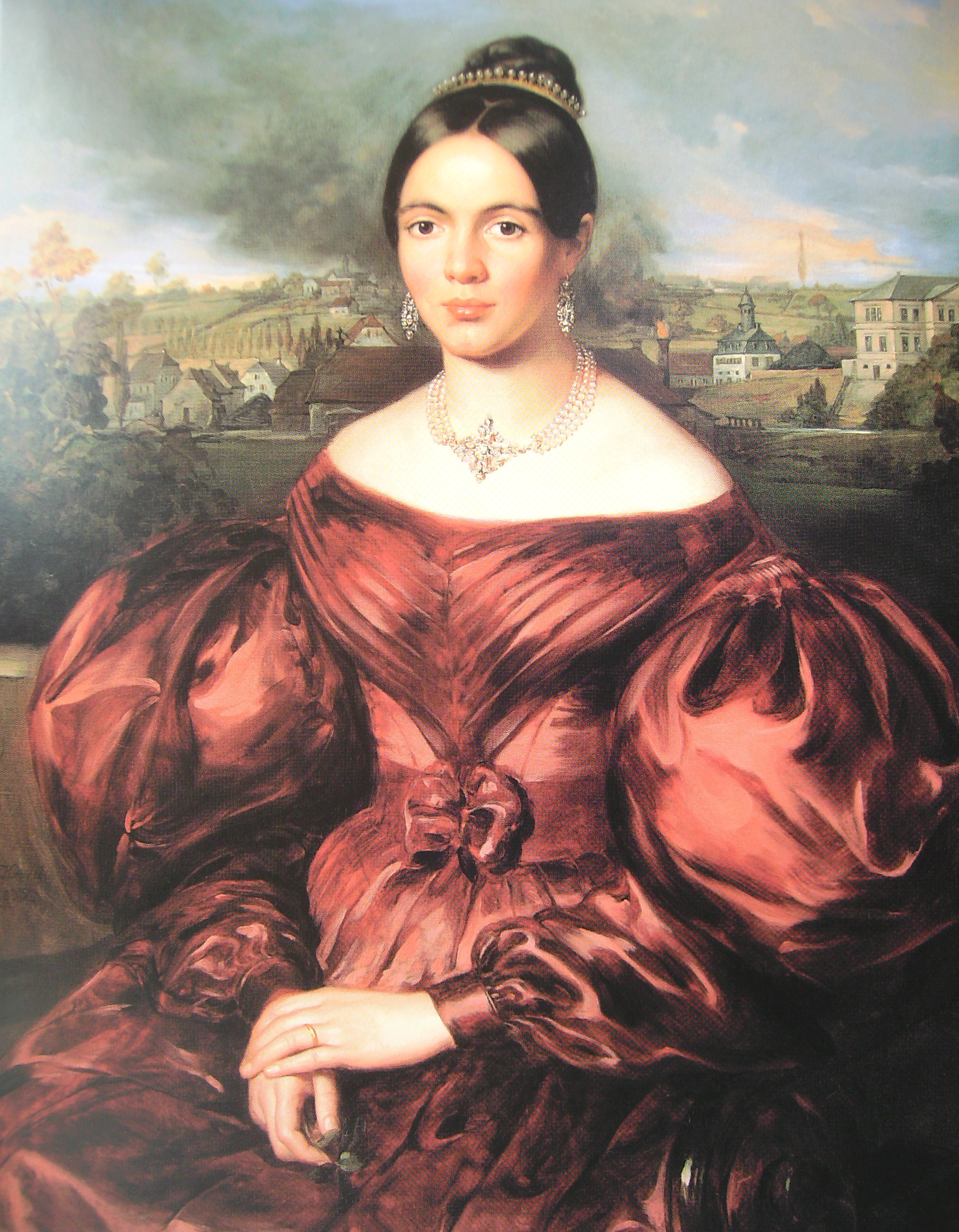
Portrait of his mother, Marie Louise Stumm, by Louis Krevel, 1835

Stumm was born on 30 March 1836 at his grandfather's palace on Ludwigsplatz, Saarbrücken in the Prussian Rhine Province. He was the eldest son of Marie Louise Böcking and Carl Friedrich Stumm (1798–1848), who killed himself during the economic crisis of the 1840s and who had run the family company as sole owner since the 1835 death of his grandfather, Friedrich Philipp Stumm. His younger brothers were diplomat Ferdinand Eduard Stumm (ennobled as Baron von Stumm in 1888) and Hugo Rudolf Stumm (ennobled as Baron von Stumm-Ramholz in 1888).

His paternal grandparents were Friedrich Philipp Stumm and Maria Elisabeth Geib. His maternal grandparents were Bernhard Richard Böcking and Catherine Friederike Christiane Claus.

Stumm attended secondary school in Mainz and Siegen and after graduating in 1854, he completed an apprenticeship in the family's Neunkirchen ironworks. He then studied law, political science and iron metallurgy in Bonn and Berlin until 1858, when he spent a year in the military with the Rhine Provinces Uhlan Regiment, No. 7. Without completing his degree, he returned to the Saar region in 1858 and took over the management of the Neunkirchen ironworks, which his uncle Karl Böcking had run since his father's suicide in 1848. After his departure in 1871, he alone managed the family's business, in which three brothers were involved after the sisters were paid off. He took part in the Franco-Prussian War of 1870 as an officer, from which he returned home as a captain, awarded the Iron Cross.

== Career ==
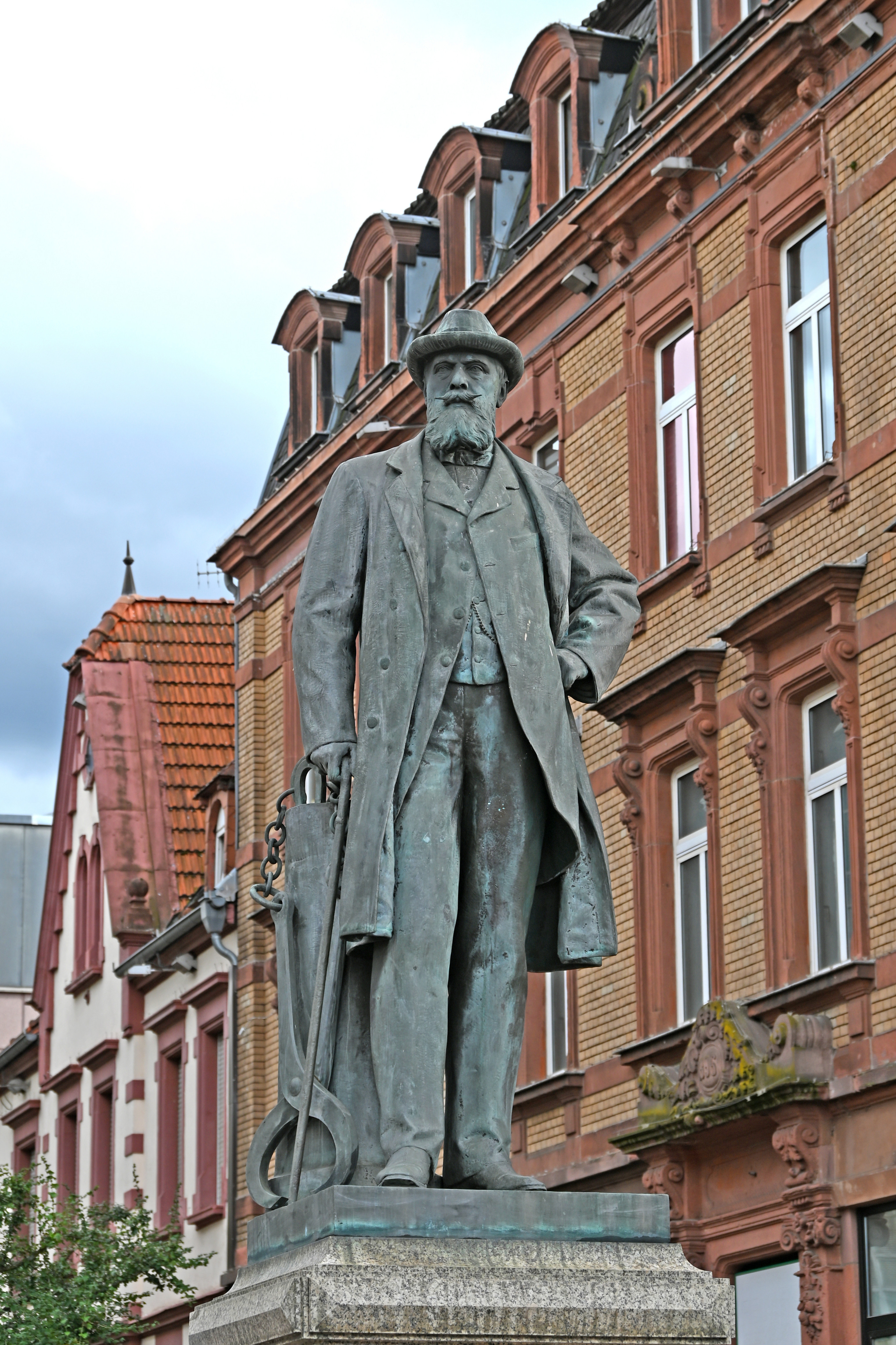
Stumm monument in Neunkirchen

Under Stumm's leadership, the Neunkirchen steelworks continuously expanded, including the construction of the first Thomas steelworks in the Saar region in 1882. In addition, he acquired minette mines in Lorraine and the construction of a blast furnace in Uckange in 1890. In 1900 he initiated the purchase of hard coal mines in the Ruhr Area (known as Zeche Minister Achenbach). He sat on the supervisory board of Dillinger Hüttenwerke AG and played a decisive role in its development due to the family's dominant shareholding. In 1875, he also acquired the Halberger Hütte, which his nephew and co-shareholder, Rudolph Böcking, managed. Thus, the family controlled all production areas of the iron industry at the time.

=== Political career ===
In 1867 he was elected to the Reichstag for the North German Confederation as a representative of the Free Conservative Party, which he co-founded. Federally elected, he was a member of the Reichstag of the German Empire from 1871 to 1881. He campaigned against the abolition of iron tariffs in 1873 and was one of the main supporters of the reintroduction of protective tariffs since 1879. As one of the leading parliamentarians of the Free Conservatives (also known as the German Reich Party), he acted against an expansion of parliament's powers and supported Bismarck's fight against Social Democrats and his Anti-Socialist Laws and proposals to abolish passive voting rights. Together with the center, Stumm brought down the state subsidy for the accident insurance in the Reichstag in 1881, which meant that, as the social policy spokesman for the Free Conservatives, he came into conflict with Bismarck and his own faction. Since the government refused to support him in his fight against social democracy and the liberal press in the Saar district in 1881, he resigned his seat in 1881, but was transferred to Prussia in 1882.

Bismarck is said to have called him "King Stumm" and Friedrich Naumann called him "the Sheik of Saarabia" because of his wealth and demeanor.

After he was ennobled as a Baron von Stumm-Halberg in 1888 (he rejected his first ennobling in 1868), he returned to politics in 1889 and sat in the Reichstag as a member of the Free Conservative faction until his death. Due to his friendship with King Wilhelm II, Stumm held great influence on government policy in the 1890s, especially social policy. In addition to the Iron Cross, he was awarded the Order of the Crown (2nd Class), Order of the Red Eagle (2nd Class), House Order of Hohenzollern (Commander's Cross of Honour), and the Belgian Order of Leopold (Grand Officer).

=== Schloss Halberg ===
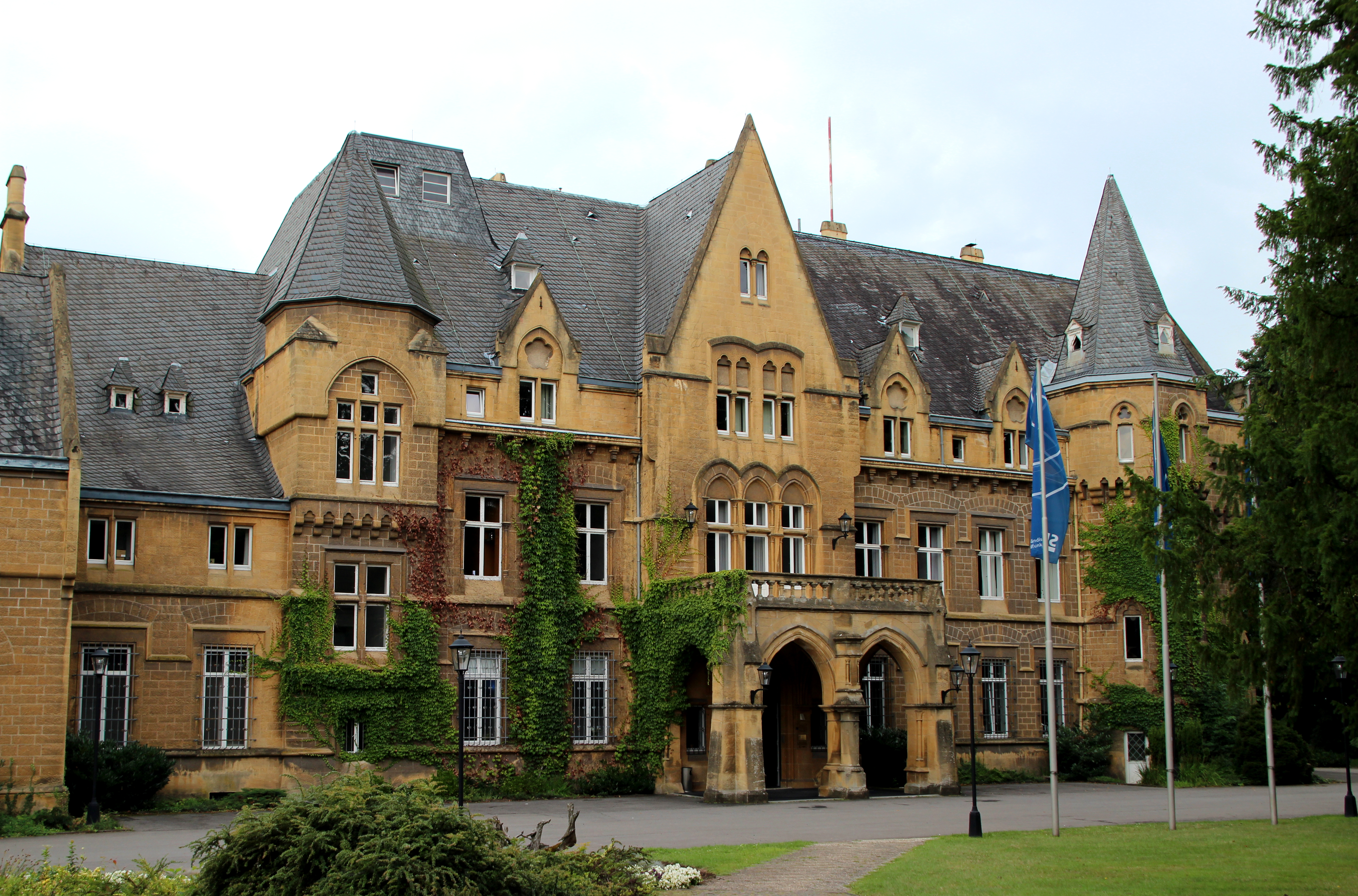
Halberg Castle

The family initially lived in the Stumm manor house on Saarbrücker Straße in Neunkirchen (which was destroyed in 1945) in the immediate vicinity of the family's factory. In 1875, Stumm acquired land on the Halberg in Saarbrücken and between 1877 and 1880, he built an elaborate schloss, called Halberg Castle (German: Schloss Halberg), in competition with his brothers, who also had large castles built in the historicist style with Ferdinand Eduard von Stumm built Schloss Rauischholzhausen and Hugo Rudolf von Stumm built Schloss Ramholz. The neo-Gothic Schloss Halberg and the nearby Stumm Church were built based on designs by the Hanoverian architects Edwin Oppler and Ferdinand Schorbach. The surrounding landscape park was designed by the Frankfurt architect Heinrich Siesmayer.

== Personal life ==
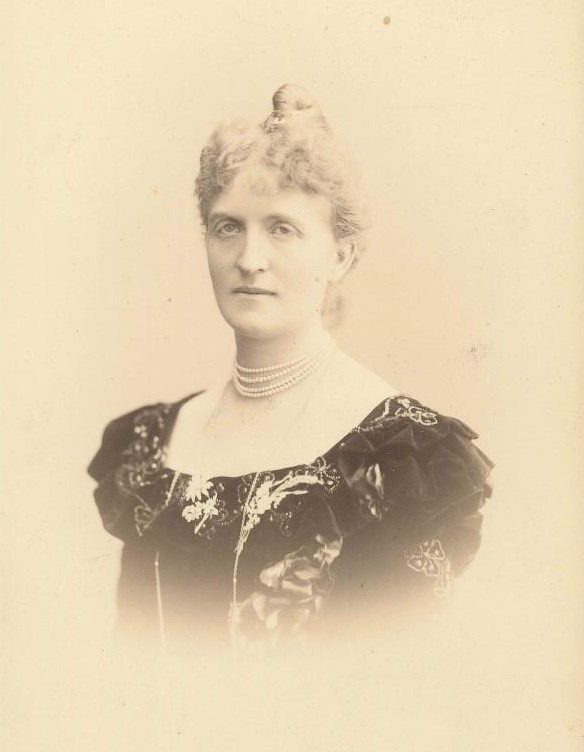
Photograph of his eldest daughter, Ida von Schubert, c. 1900

Stumm was married to his second cousin, Ida Charlotte Böcking (8 May 1839 – 10 March 1918), a daughter of Heinrich Rudolf Böcking and Louise Caroline Hildebrand, on 31 May 1860. Her grandfather, Heinrich Böcking, was a mining adviser and mayor in Saarbrücken. Together, they were the parents of:

- Baroness Ida Henriette Charlotte von Stumm-Halberg (1861–1916), who married Prussian Lt. Gen. Conrad von Schubert, brother of Gen. Richard von Schubert.
- Baroness Elisabeth Maria Braun von Stumm-Halberg (1863–1911)
- Baroness Helene Caroline von Stumm-Halberg (1865–1933), who married chamberlain Waldemar Anno Otto Kurt von Heimburg.
- Rudolf Karl Heinrich Stumm (1874–1875), who died young.
- Baroness Bertha von Stumm-Halberg (1876–1949), who married diplomat Hellmuth Lucius von Stoedten. They divorced in 1907 and she married landowner Adalbert von Francken-Sierstorpff in 1912.

Baron von Stumm-Halberg died on 8 March 1901 at Schloss Halberg in Saarbrücken. Upon his death, his daughter Bertha inherited the Königklinger Island near Eltville (which he had acquired in 1888).
