= Rau von Holzhausen =

The Rau von Holzhausen are a noble family whose seat was located in Hesse, Germany.

== History ==
The head of the house of Rau was styled the "Freiherr [Baron] Rau von und zu Holzhausen," although they held several other titles, including an order from the Kaiser that their title, since it was ancient, was to be styled a level higher, thus giving it the title Graf (Count) Rau von Holzhausen. The family was connected to upper nobility and royalty through a variety of marriages and alliances, most notably through the mother of Queen Victoria of the United Kingdom. They first received recognition by the Frankish ruler Charlemagne, and were granted a coat of arms. This honor was in respect of the unwillingness to surrender of a member of the family (since being considered the first lord) during the Frankish ruler's wars eastward through what is now Germany, notably against the Saxons. Although the Rau family became a well-landed family in Hesse, with their seat at Rauischholzhausen, other estates such as the baronies of Nordeck and Frauenberg, and lands in Bavaria became properties to the noble Lords. Rauischholzhausen was acquired in the early 14th century, and was in the hands of the family until the 1880s, when it was sold to industrialist and diplomat Ferdinand Eduard Stumm (later ennobled as Baron von Stumm). The last Lord Rau von Holzhausen sold much of his property after German unification, and moved out of Germany shortly thereafter, although branches of the family remained influential in Germany for the next century.

== See also ==
- Rauischholzhausen Castle
