= Knut von Kühlmann-Stumm =

German Bundestag politician

Knut von Kühlmann-Stumm Baron von Kühlmann-Stumm
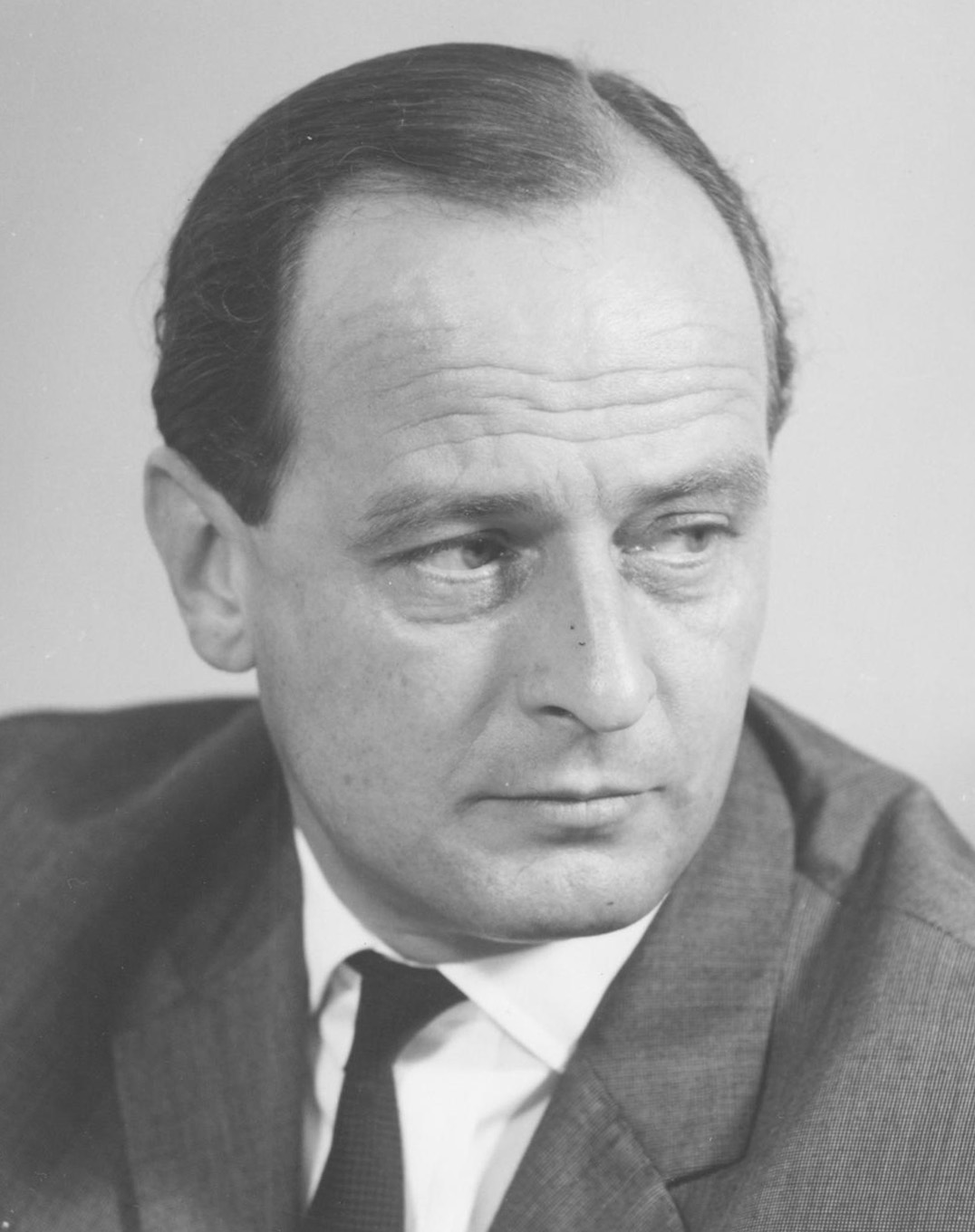
- Baron Knut von Kühlmann-Stumm
- Born: Knut Otto Christian Hans Konstantin Hubertus von Kühlmann-Stumm; 17 October 1916; Munich
- Died: 19 January 1977 (aged 60); Bad Soden-Salmünster
- Education: Schloss Salem
- Political party: Free Democratic
- Spouse: Jutta von Ramin
- Parent(s): Richard von Kühlmann; Margarete Freiin von Stumm
- Relatives: Hugo Rudolf von Stumm (grandfather)

Knut Otto Christian Hans Konstantin Hubertus von Kühlmann-Stumm (17 October 1916 – 19 January 1977), was a German politician for the Free Democratic Party who owned Ramholz Castle.

== Early life ==
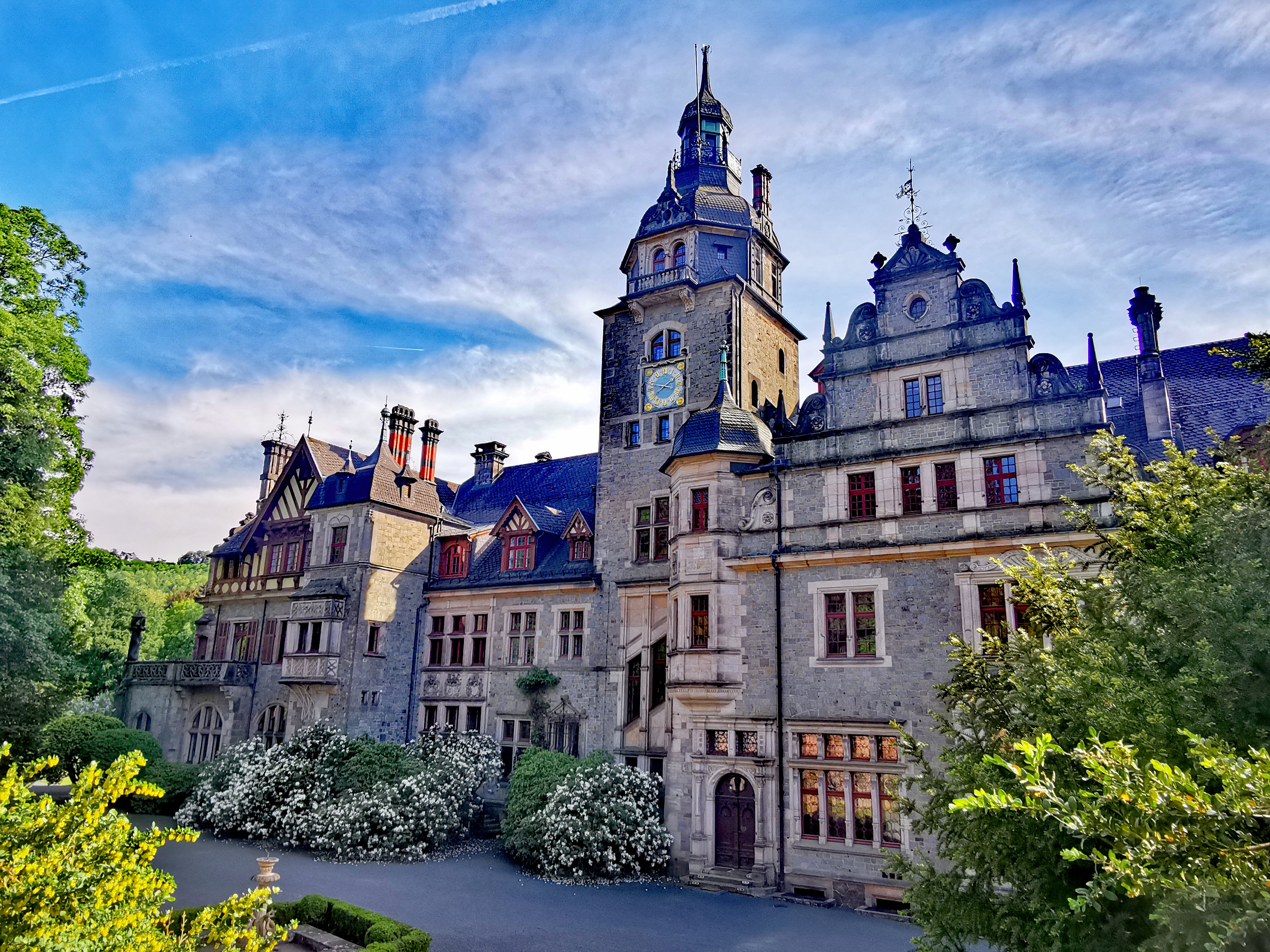
Ramholz Castle

Kühlmann was born 17 October 1916, in Munich. He was the son of German entrepreneur and industrialist Richard von Kühlmann (1873–1948) and Margarete Freiin von Stumm (1884–1917). His father served as State Secretary for Foreign Affairs, who was Ambassador to the Ottoman Empire and the Netherlands. His maternal grandfather was Baron Hugo Rudolf von Stumm, a German industrialist, landowner, member of the state parliament and Prussian cavalry officer.

As an infant, he inherited Ramholz Castle upon his mother's death. He attended school at Schloss Salem. After school he completed a two year banking apprenticeship in Berlin.

== Career ==
From 1936 to 1945 he served in the German Wehrmacht. After World War II he ran his own farm in Ramholz. He inherited a share of family mining company Gebrüder Stumm in Neunkirchen, Saarland.

From 1956 to 1972, Kühlmann was member of the German FDP. From 1960 he was member of German Bundestag. During the period of the Kiesinger cabinet, Kühlmann-Stumm served as opposition leader from 1966 to 1968. He left the FDP because of its support for the Ostpolitik of chancellor Willy Brandt, joining the conservative CDU instead.

== Personal life ==
Kühlmann married Jutta von Ramin, daughter of Jürgen von Ramin. Together, they had a son:

- Magnus von Kühlmann-Stumm.

Baron von Kühlmann-Stumm died in a car accident on 19 January 1977 in Bad Soden-Salmünster.

== Awards ==
- 1968: Order of Merit of the Federal Republic of Germany
