= Ferdinand Eduard von Stumm =

Prussian and German diplomat (1843–1925

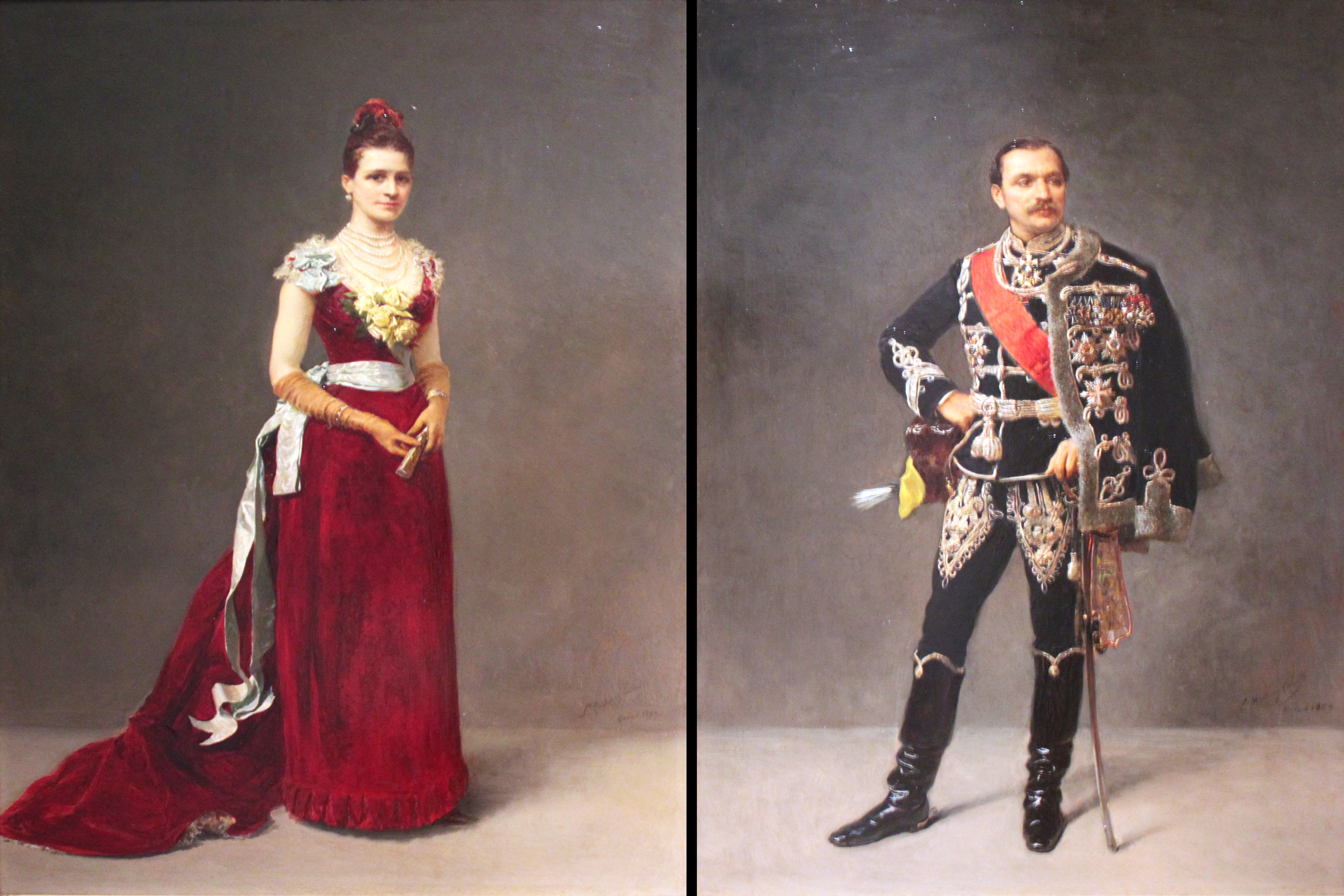
Double portrait of Freiherr von Stumm and his wife, Pauline, by Salvador Martínez Cubells, 1890 (German Historical Museum)

Ferdinand Eduard, Freiherr von Stumm (12 July 1843 – 10 May 1925), was a Prussian and German diplomat.

== Early life ==
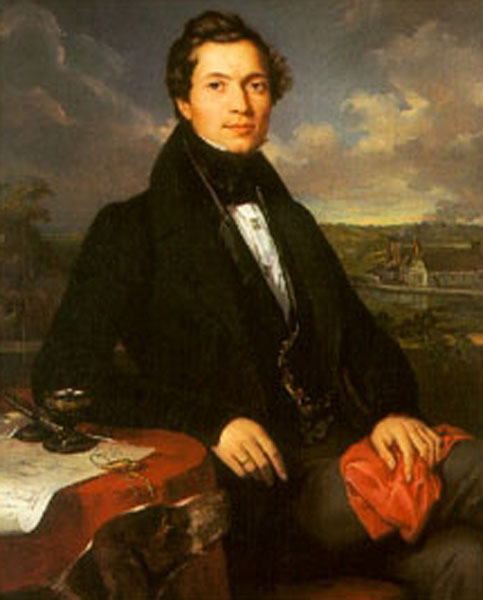
Portrait of his father, Karl Friedrich Stumm, by Louis Krevel, 1836.

Stumm was born on 12 July 1843 in Neunkirchen, Saarland. His father was Karl Friedrich Stumm (1798–1848), who died by suicide during the economic crisis of the 1840s and who had run the family company as sole owner since the 1835 death of his grandfather, Friedrich Philipp Stumm. His elder brother was Carl Ferdinand Stumm (ennobled as Baron von Stumm-Halberg in 1888) and his younger brother was Hugo Rudolf Stumm (ennobled as Baron von Stumm-Ramholz in 1888).

== Career ==
Stumm came from a family of entrepreneurs who bought the Neunkircher ironworks and shares in other ironworks in Saarland in 1806. While his older brother Carl took over the management of the ironworks, Ferdinand benefited from the profits of the family business as a silent partner.

As an officer, Stumm took part in the Second Schleswig War of 1864 and the Austro-Prussian War of 1866. He was attached to the Prussian legation in Florence in 1867, took part in the British expedition to Abyssinia in 1868 and worked in the Prussian Foreign Ministry in Berlin under Otto von Bismarck in 1869. After taking part in the Franco-Prussian War of 1870, he served as Prussian chargé d'affaires to the Holy See in 1871. He was second and first secretary at the German missions in Paris, Munich, Washington, D.C., Brussels, St. Petersburg and London. In 1883 he was appointed Prussian envoy in Darmstadt, imperial envoy in Copenhagen in 1885, envoy in 1887 then ambassador in Madrid in 1888. He was ennobled on 5 May 1888 by King Frederick III, and was made a privy councilor in 1892.

In 1903 he took over the chairmanship of the supervisory board of the company Gebrüder Stumm GmbH, the 23rd largest company in the German Empire in 1907.

=== Land holdings ===
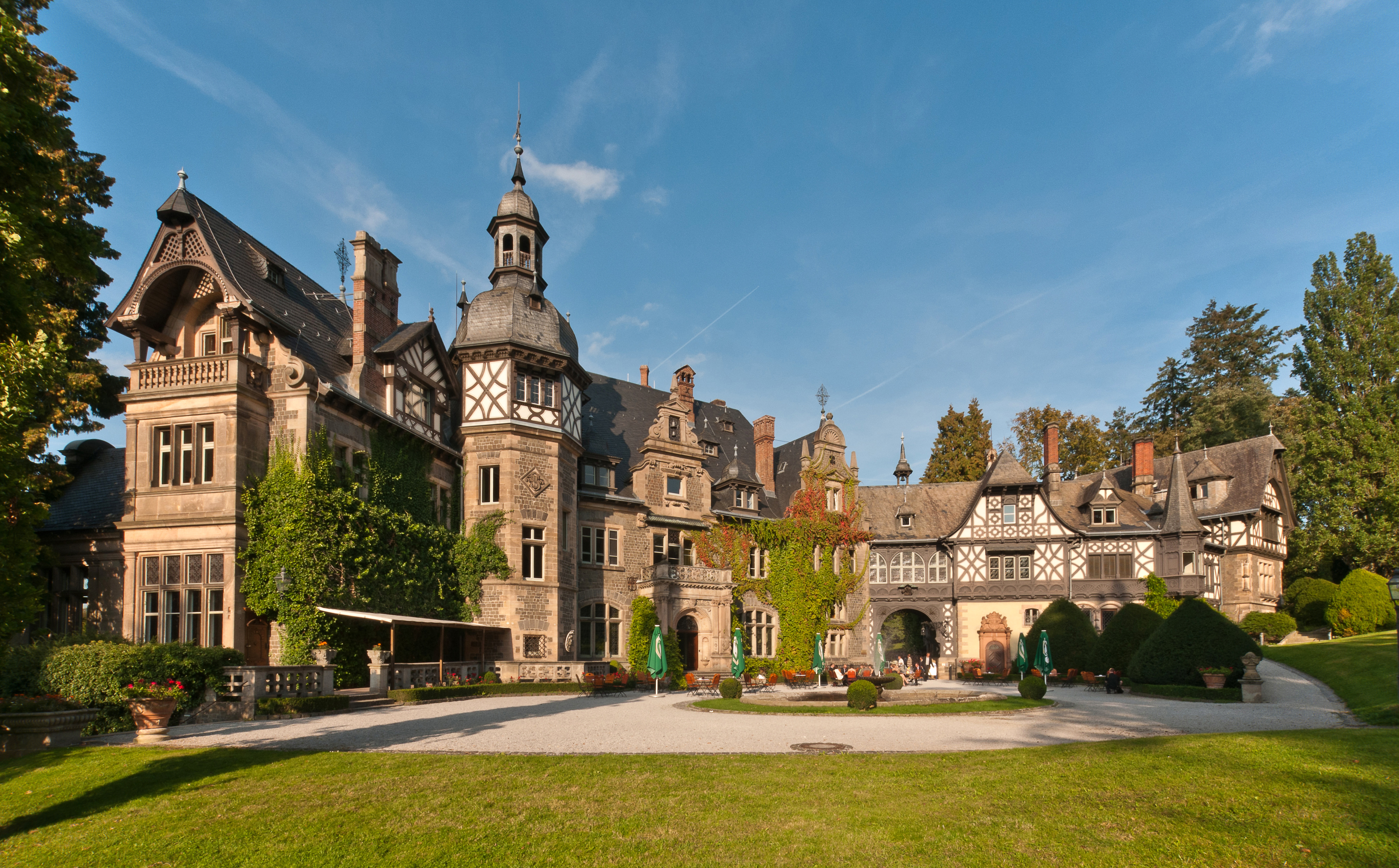
Rauischholzhausen Castle

In 1873, Stumm bought Schloss Rauischholzhausen in Rauischholzhausen (one of eleven villages in Ebsdorfergrund, Marburg-Biedenkopf district, Hesse) from Rau von Holzhausen. Stumm and his wife built several public buildings in Rauischholzhausen, including a church, a Protestant community center, a dairy and a retirement home.

By 1908 Stumm was one of the 100 richest residents of Prussia and owned two manors: the 700 hectares (1,700 acres) Rauischholzhausen and Rohlstorf in the district of Segeberg, in Schleswig-Holstein, with 1,500 hectares (3,700 acres).

== Personal life ==
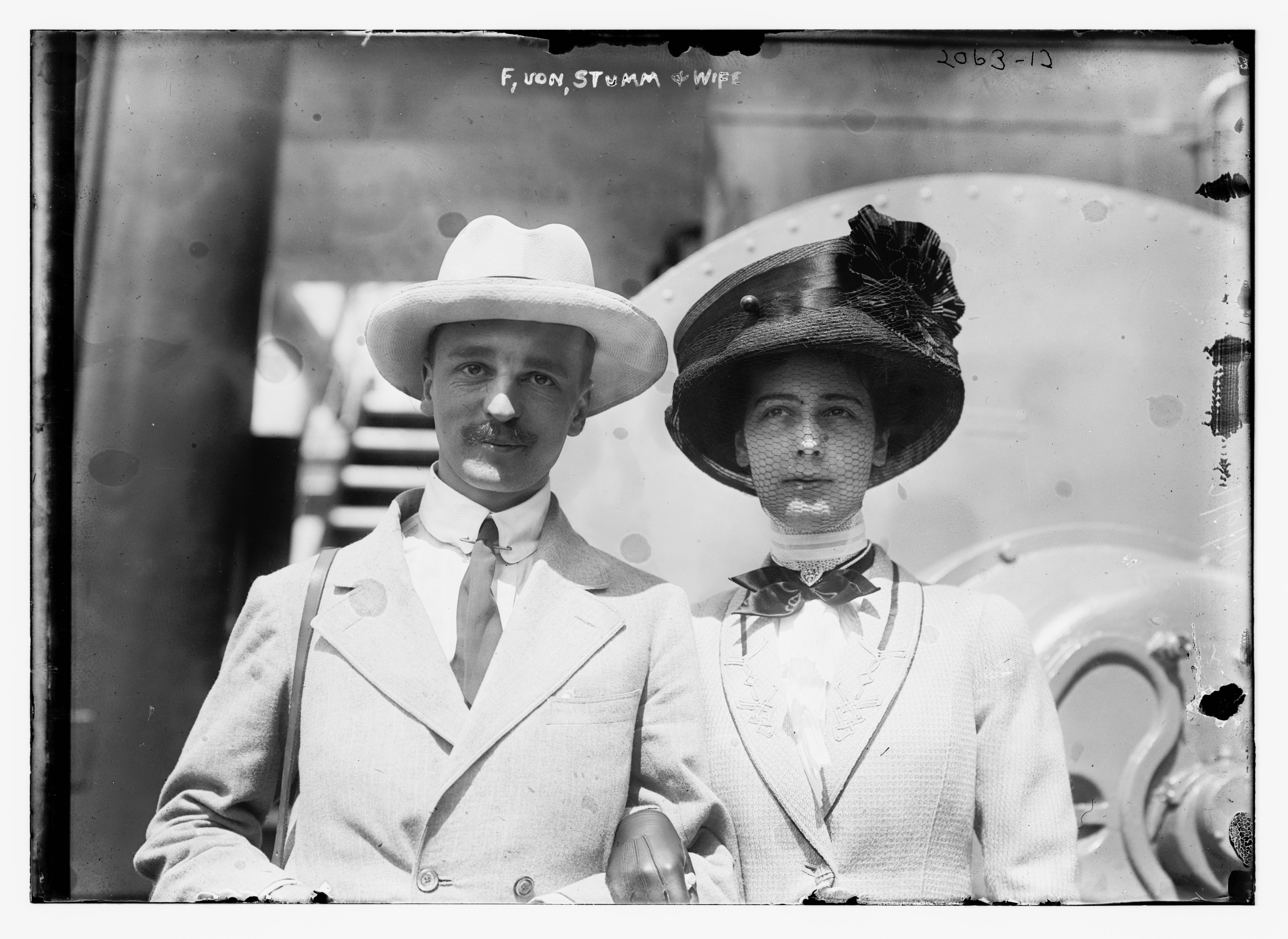
Photograph of his eldest son Ferdinand and his wife, Constance

On 28 June 1879, Stumm married American heiress Pauline von Hoffmann (12 August 1858 – 9 October 1950), in Fulda. The younger daughter of Louis von Hoffmann, a wealthy New York banker who was one of the founders of the Knickerbocker Club and his wife, Athenais von Hoffmann (née Grymes). Her elder sister, Medora de Vallombrosa, Marquise de Morès married the Marquis de Mores. Together, they were the parents of:

- Baron Ferdinand Carl von Stumm (1880–1954), a diplomat and entrepreneur, who married American heiress Constance Hoyt, daughter of Henry Hoyt Jr., in 1910. After her death in 1923, he married Baroness Vera von Wolff, daughter of Baron Nikolaus Boris von Wolff and former wife of Karl Gustav von Platen.
- Baroness Maria von Stumm (1882–1954), who married Prince Paul Hermann Karl Hubert von Hatzfeldt, son of the Ambassador to England Paul von Hatzfeldt in 1911.
- Baron Herbert Wilhelm von Stumm (1885–1943), who married Alice Schuchard in 1913.
- Baron Friedrich Wilhelm von Stumm (1888–1946), who married Laurette Luise von Stülpnagel.

Baron von Stumm died on 10 May 1925 in Locarno, Switzerland.

=== Descendants ===
Through his eldest son Ferdinand, he was a grandfather of Nora von Stumm (1916–2000), who married Count Hyacinth Strachwitz.
