= Steckelberg Castle =

Castle in Schlüchtern, Austria

- Burg Steckelberg
- Schlüchtern-Ramholz
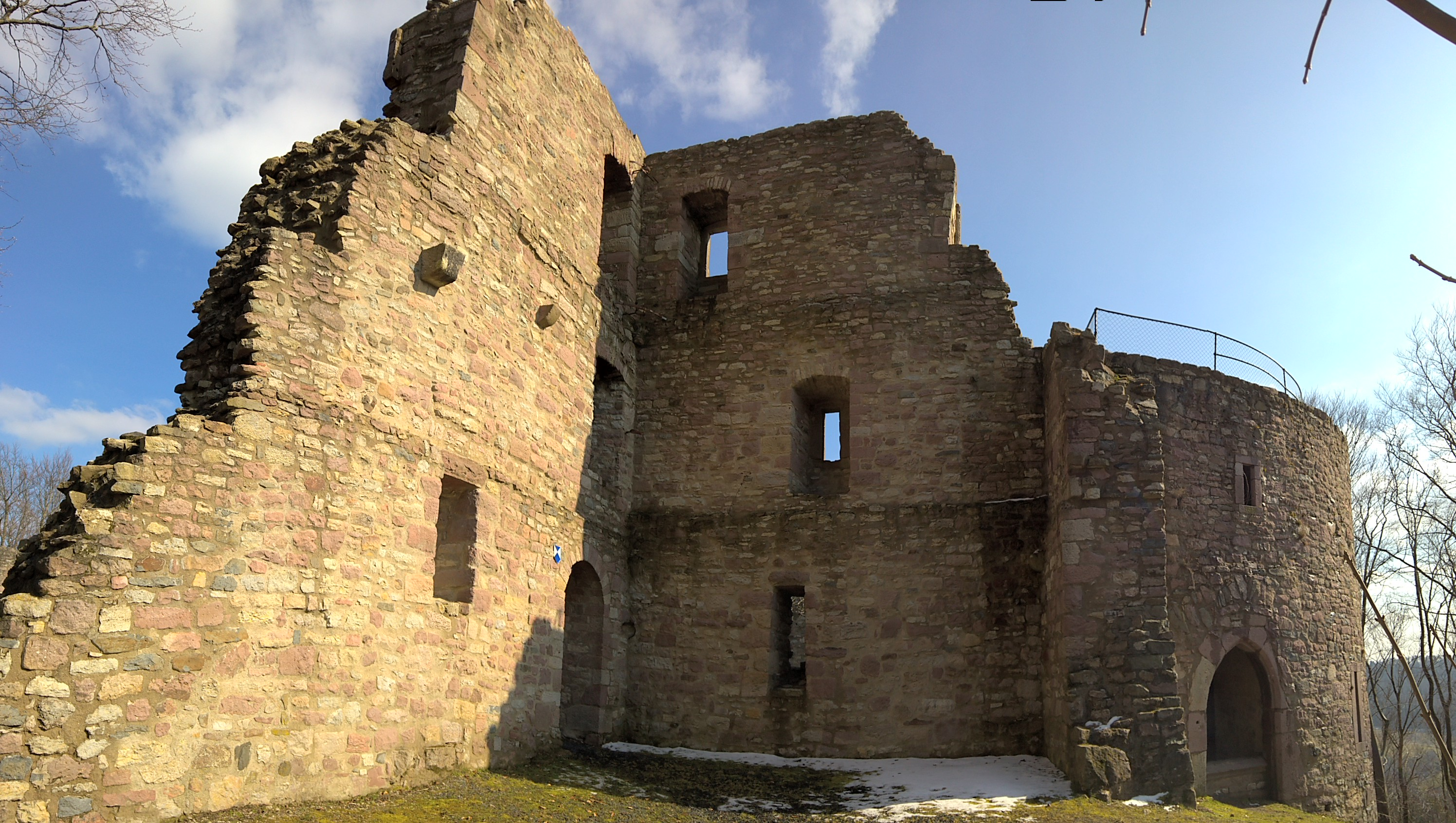
- castle ruins of palas and round tower

Site information
- Type: hill castle
- Code: DE-HE
- Condition: restored ruins

Location
- Location within Hesse Location within Germany
- Coordinates: 50°20′14″N 9°37′14″E

Site history
- Built: 1131 (first castle); 1387/1388 (current ruins)

Garrison information
- Occupants: nobility

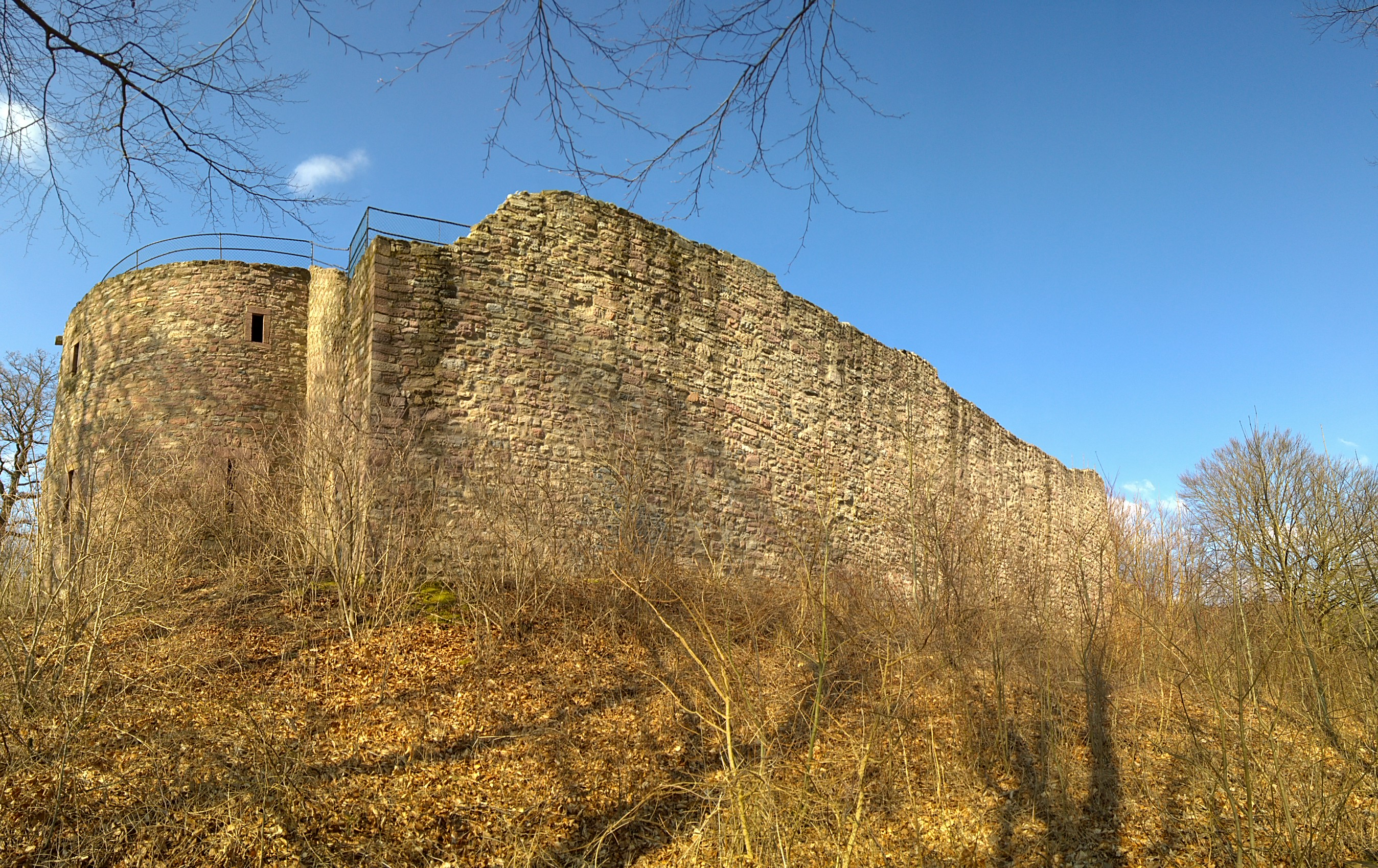
restored castle wall

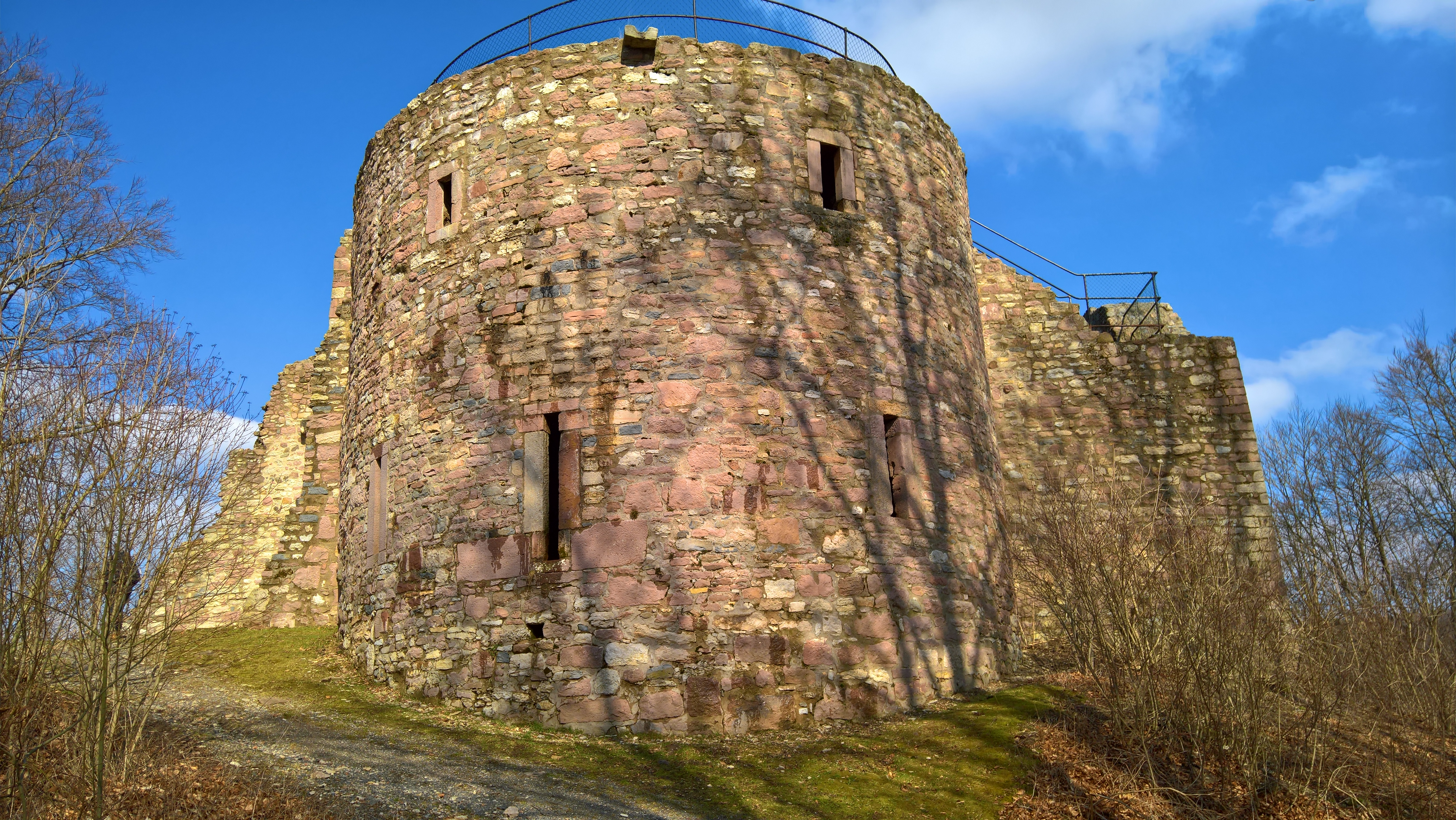
the round tower (gun torret), later dwelling house

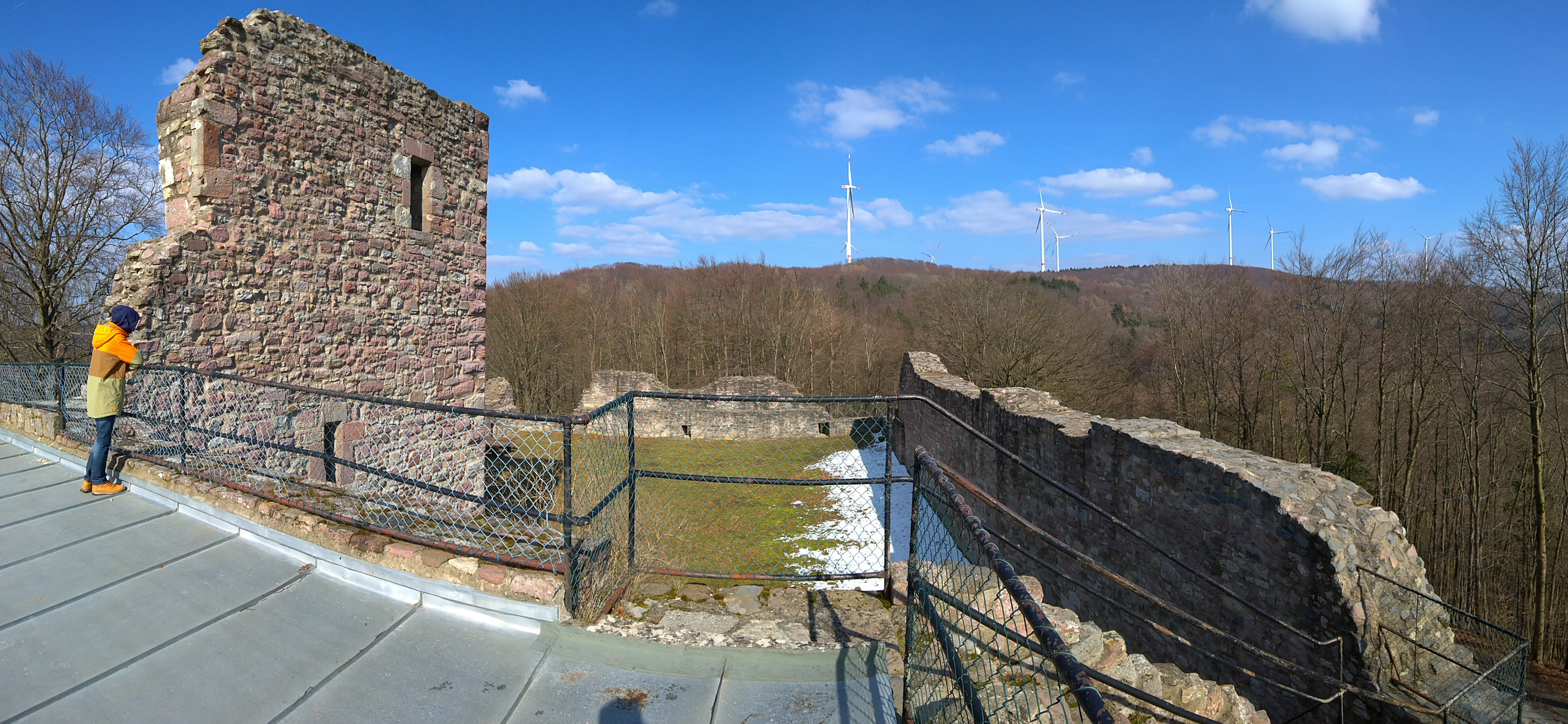
view from top of round tower to the castle

Steckelberg Castle (German: Burg Steckelberg) is a ruined hill castle near Ramholz, in the borough of the East Hessian town of Schlüchtern in Germany.

== Location ==
The ruins of the old castle lie east of Vollmerz and northeast of Ramholz on the domed crest of a hill spur, the eponymous Steckelberg.

== History ==
The name of the castle goes back to the Middle High German term for "steep hill" (Stechelnberc). As an imperial castle, the fortification was used to guard the transportation routes that ran through the hills. The wine route from Fulda to Franconia ran over the ridge of the Breite First here; this important north-south link, which research on old roads indicates was known as early as the Carolingian period, grazes the area of the castle as it passes from Veitsteinbach and Sterbfritz.

From 1131 to 1391, they had their family seat at an earlier castle on a nearby site. This "Old Steckelberg Castle" (alte Burg Steckelberg) was located to the northeast of the present ruins on a spur of the Breite First, which is known today as Alteburgberg or Nickus. The baronial line of Hermann von Steckelberg is mentioned around 1167. Roughly between 1240 and 1276, the castle must have been in the possession of the Bishopric of Wurzburg. In 1274, Bishop Berthold II pledged the castle to Count Reinhard I of Hanau, whom he needed as an ally. In 1276, it was illegally occupied and used as a robber baron castle. It was destroyed by order of King Rudolph I in 1276. He issued a decree on 14 October 1276, which ordered that "the Steckelburg is to be demolished and is not to be rebuilt without imperial leave.". The castle was supposedly a threat to the peace or Landfrieden; more probably, it served to tidy up the estates of the Landvogt and confidant of the king, the Count of Hanau, in this area. Nevertheless, the lords of Steckelberg retained rights of management and use.

There are no more details on the history of the Old Steckelberg Castle. It is, however, certain that this was not the oldest fortification in this location. In 1969, the remains of a large circular rampart, about 0.38 hectares in area and dating to the Early Middle Ages, were discovered in the immediate vicinity.

The male line of the Steckelberg family was extinguished in the mid-14th century and both estates and hereditary fiefs went to the daughters and their husbands, among them, Frowin von Hutten (died 1377). He inherited inter alia arable fields and pasture land at Steckelberg. Frowin's son, Ulrich von Hutten (died 1423), used this starting point to re-fortify the castle hill in 1388 and build Steckelberg Castle in its present location. To legally circumvent the royal prohibition, the castle was moved a few hundred metres to a site above the earlier castle destroyed in 1276. This de facto breach of the law went unpunished because Ulrich transferred ownership of the castle back to the Bishop of Würzburg and thus removed the power of jurisdiction from the actual rulers, i.e. the Count of Hanau.

After Ulrich's death, the whole family was enfeoffed with Steckelberg Castle. In 1452, Lorenz von Hutten (died 1498) signed a Burgfrieden agreement with the other co-heirs that, in addition to laying down the charges for common facilities, specified how the castle would be supplied in the event of a siege and under which conditions the castle could be used as the base in the event of feuds. Despite this settlement, a dispute broke out that same year between Hutten-Steckelberg and their Wurzburg liege lord when he wanted to take on 32 external heirs. As a result, the castle was besieged and finally conquered by Bishop John in 1458. By 1459, he had returned the castle, however, after an agreement had been reached. The partially demolished buildings were rebuilt or renovated and occupied once more.

On 21 April 1488, the reforming knight, Ulrich von Hutten, was born here. In a letter to Willibald Pirckheimer dated 1518, he vividly describes - but probably in an overstated way - the conditions at his home castle.

In 1525, rebel farmers stormed the Steckelberg but failed to take it. From the mid-16th century, the secondary family seat at the foot of Castle Hill in the parish of Ramholz gained importance to its owners. Steckelberg Castle maintained its defensive role until the late 17th century, as enfeoffments during the Thirty Years' War make clear. However, Philipp Daniel von Hutten (died 1687) was the last aristocratic inhabitant of the castle. From this period, there is also a hand drawing showing the castle in its final phase, having probably remained largely unaltered since 1509. In 1700, the castle was already being used as a quarry. It can be assumed that in the course of the Thirty Years' War, it became uninhabitable.

In 1883, Baron Hugo Rudolf von Stumm purchased the ruins and protected them from further decay. He bought the Hutten estate in Ramholz for himself and built it into a spacious palace complex in the style of historicism known as Ramholz Castle.

In 2004, the current owner had the east wall of the castle renovated and cleared the moat. In early 2008, the ruins were placed out of bounds because parts of the north wall had collapsed. On 26 May 2013, the newly renovated ruins of Steckelberg Castle were officially re-opened to the public.

== Layout ==
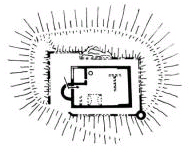
Ground plan of the castle

The ruins of the old castle today comprise the remains of a rectangular curtain wall with, in the west, a turret at the entrance (with a built-in modern chimney), a three-storey cabinet in the northwest and a cellar. In mid-2007, large parts of the walls collapsed.

According to a theory that has been repeated uncritically, Ulrich's father of the same name had the so-called Batterieturm built in 1509 as a mighty powder or battery tower that was to control access to the castle. However, its masonry and embrasures clearly show that the tower was built as part of the 1388/1389 construction. The door with the year 1509 on it was added later. That year marked the conversion of the tower, which had become rather unusable, into additional domestic accommodation, as evinced by the architectural design of the door, chimney and other details.

== Gallery ==
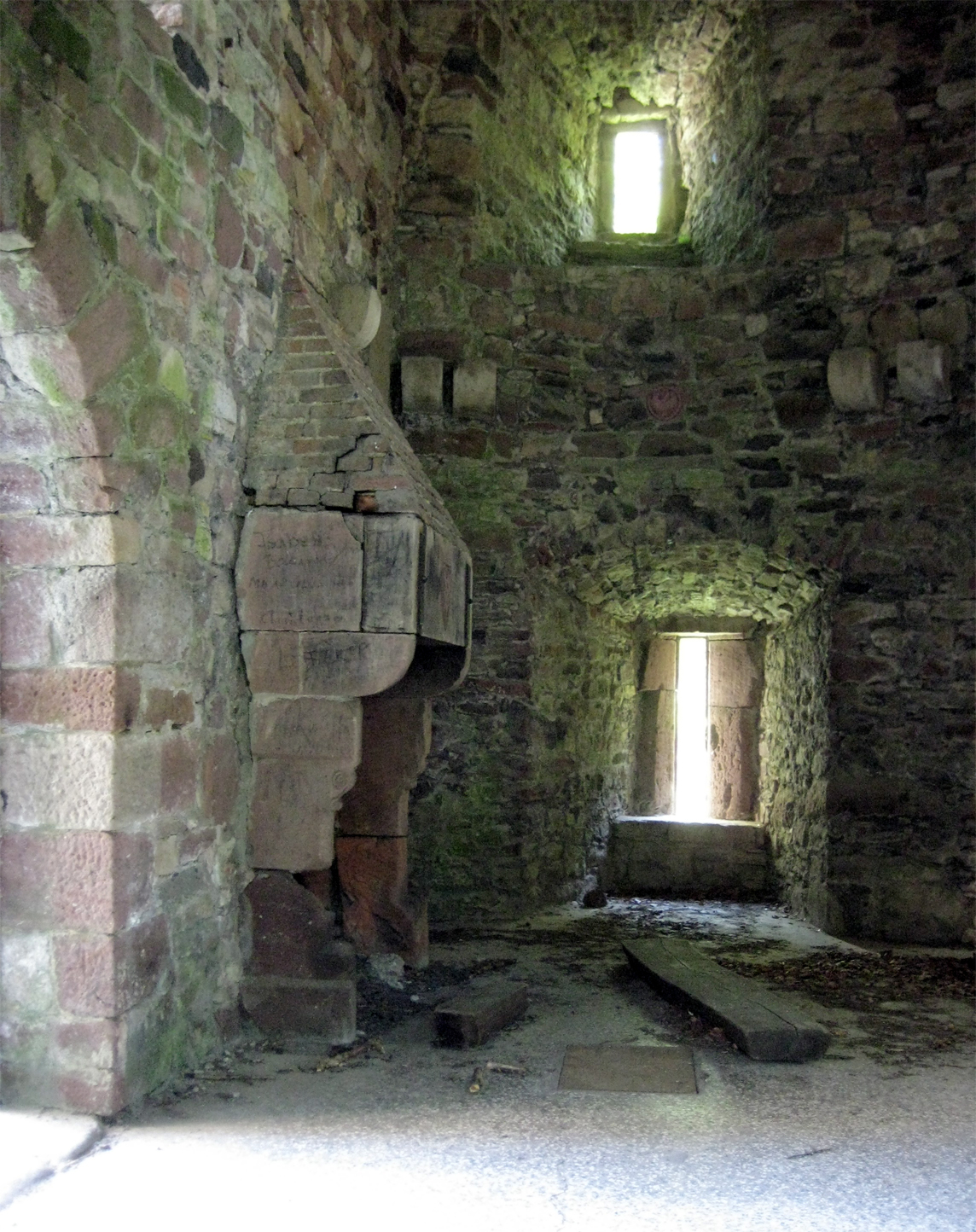
The fireplace in the cabinet

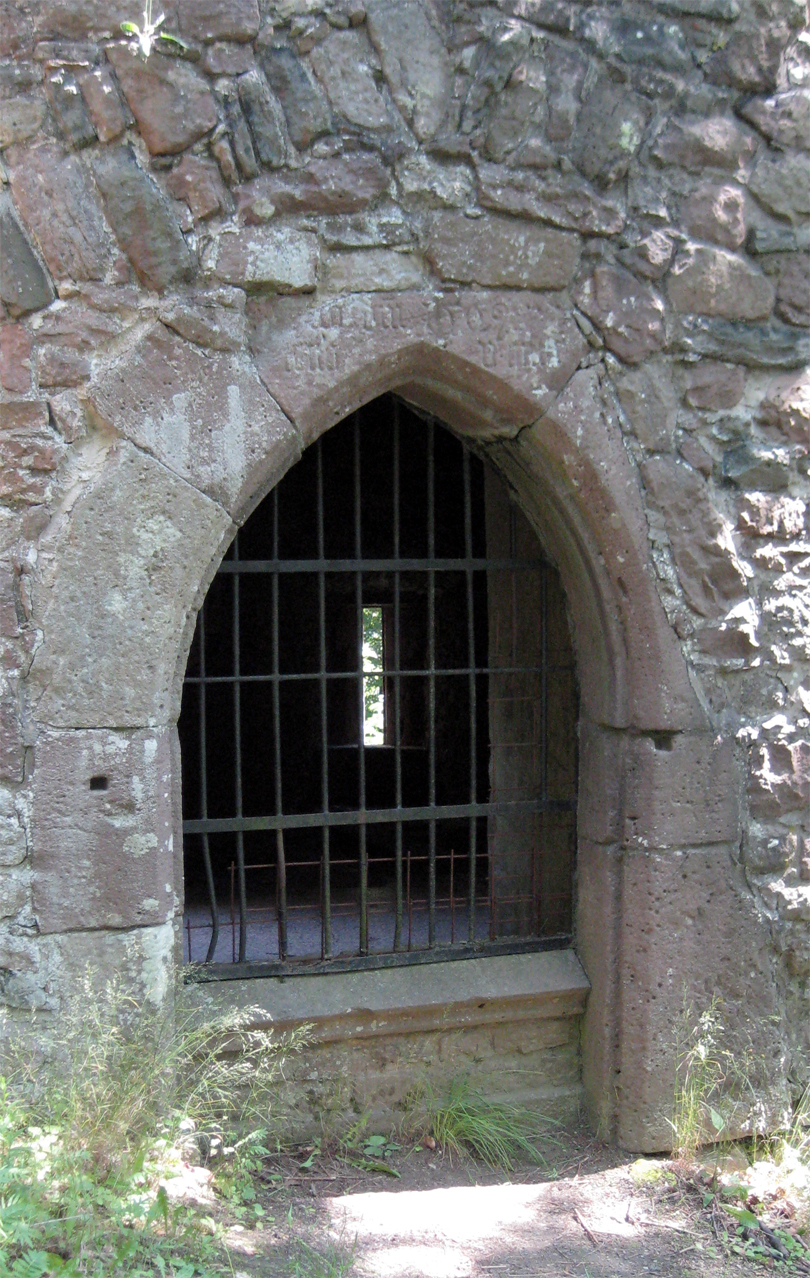
The 1509 portal

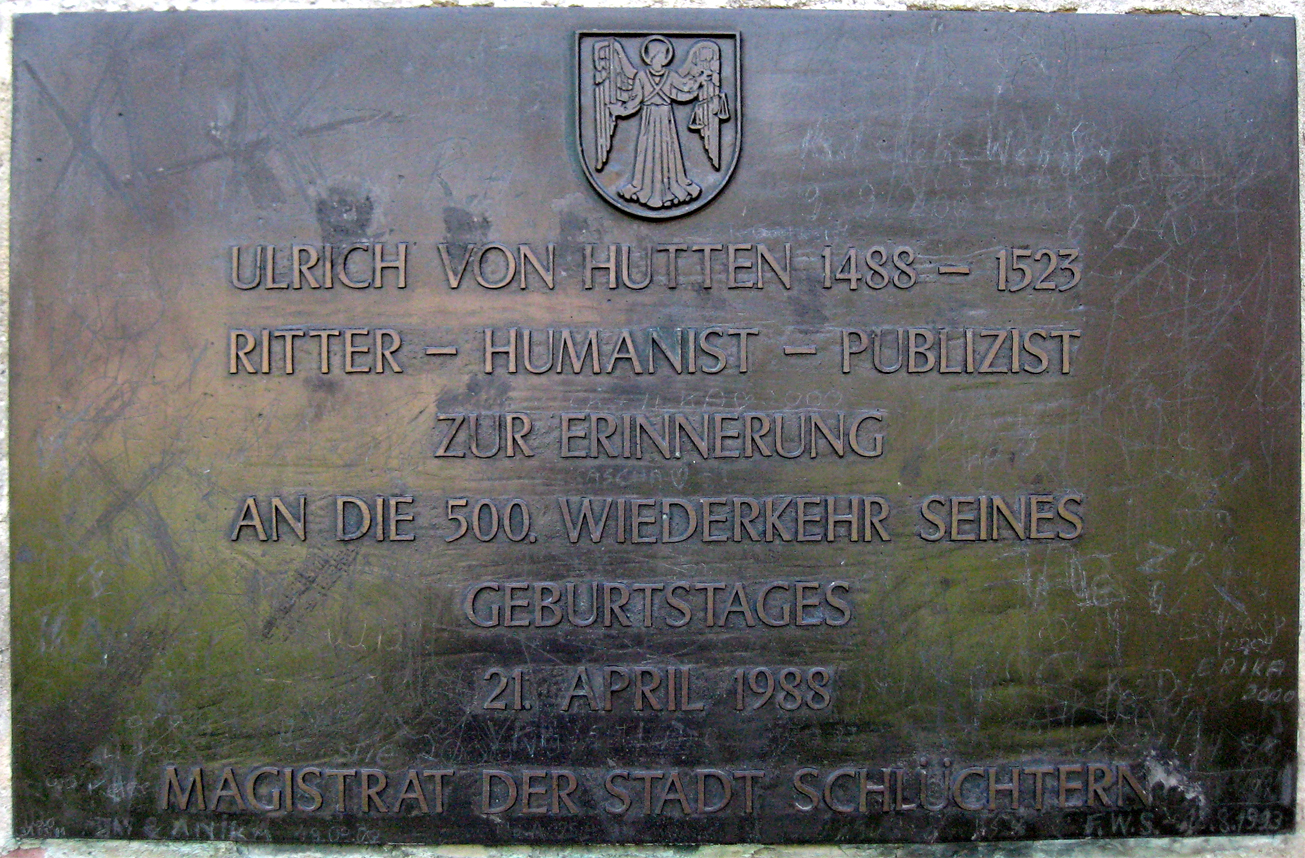
Memorial tablet to the knight, Ulrich von Hutten

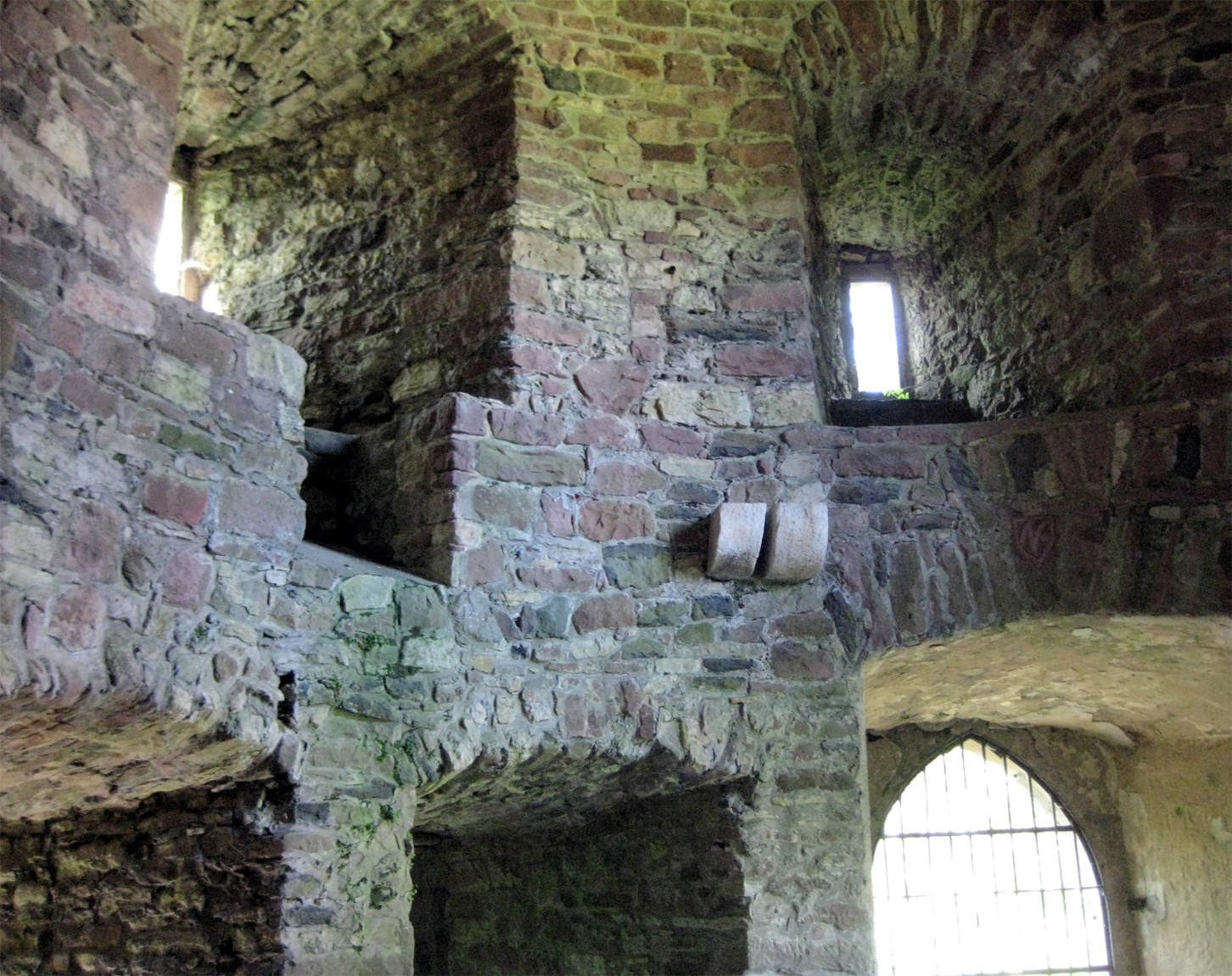
Inner view of the round tower

== Literature ==
- Dehio, Ernst Gall: Handbuch der deutschen Kunstdenkmäler. Südliches Hessen, Berlin, 1950.
- Fritz-Rudolf Herrmann: Ruine Steckelberg und ihre Vorgänger bei Schlüchtern-Vollmerz, Main-Kinzig-Kreis. Führungsblatt zu der frühmittelalterlichen Wallanlage, der Altenburg und der Burg Steckelberg über Ramholz. (Archäologische Denkmäler in Hessen, Heft 105.) Landesamt für Denkmalpflege Hessen, Wiesbaden, 1993, ISBN 3-89822-105-9
- Elvira Klein: Der Ausflug zu Burgen und Schlössern in Hessen und Nachbarschaft, Frankfurt am Main, 1996.
- Rudolf Knappe: Mittelalterliche Burgen in Hessen. 800 Burgen, Burgruinen und Burgstätten, Wartberg Verlag, Gudensberg-Gleichen, 2000. ISBN 3-86134-228-6
- Hans Körner: Die Familie von Hutten. Genealogie und Besitz bis zum Ende des Alten Reiches, in: Peter Laub und Ludwig Steinfeld (revised): Ulrich von Hutten : Ritter - Humanist - Publizist (1488-1523). Katalog zur Ausstellung des Landes Hessen anläßlich des 500. Geburtstages. Kassel, 1988, pp. 143–153.
- Jörg Lindenthal: Kulturelle Entdeckungen. Archäologische Denkmäler in Hessen. Jenior, Kassel, 2004, pp. 185f, ISBN 3-934377-73-4
