= List of ambassadors of Germany to Spain =

This list contains the German ambassadors and heads of mission in Spain. Since 1995, the German ambassador in Madrid has also been double accredited to Andorra and traditionally presents his credentials for Andorra to the Co-Prince of Andorra, the Bishop of Urgell.

== History ==
The Embassy of the Federal Republic of Germany is located on Calle de Fortuny in Madrid. There is a Consulate General located in Barcelona (the capital and largest city of the autonomous community of Catalonia); Consulates in Las Palmas de Gran Canaria (the capital of Gran Canaria, in the Canary Islands), Málaga (the capital of the province of Málaga), and La Palma (one of the Canary Islands); and honorary consuls in Almería (the capital of the province of Almería), Alicante (the capital of the province of Alicante), Bilbao (the largest city in the province of Biscay), Menorca (one of the Balearic Islands), Playa Blanca (a town on the island of Lanzarote), Puerto de la Cruz (a city in the northern part of the island of Tenerife, Canary Islands), Santa Cruz de La Palma (capital of the island of La Palma), Valencia (the capital of the autonomous community of Valencia), Vigo (a city in the province of Pontevedra), and Zaragoza (the capital city of the province of Zaragoza).

== Ambassadors of the Federal Republic of Germany ==
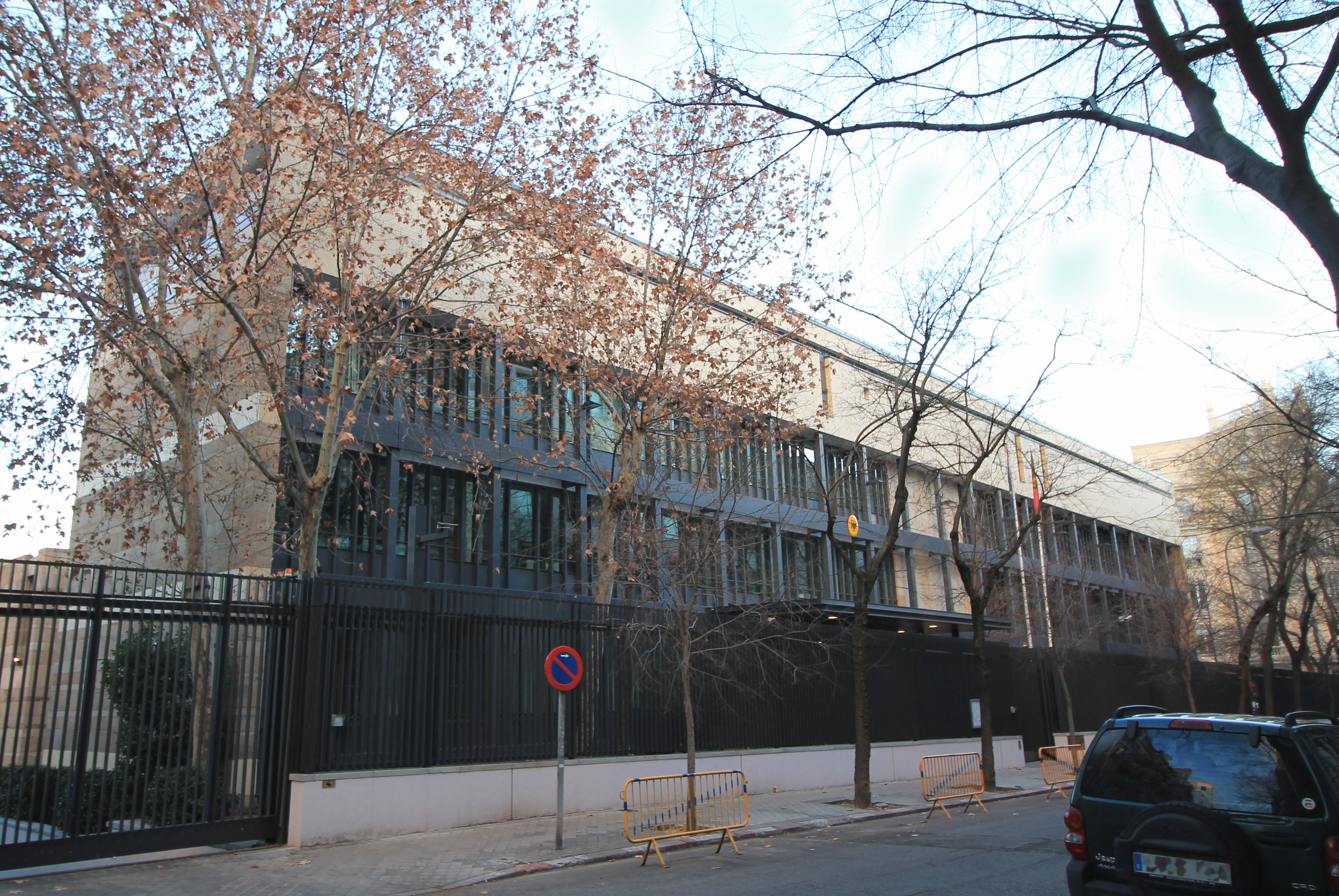
The new building of the German Embassy, built in 1967, architect: Alexander von Branca

| Name | Image | Term Start | Term End | Notes |
/ Federal Republic of Germany
| Prince Adalbert of Bavaria | | 1952 | 1956 | |
| Karl Heinrich Knappstein | | 1956 | 1958 | |
| Wolfgang von Welck | | 1958 | 1963 | Military attaché from 1958–1964: Achim Oster |
| Helmut Allardt | | 1963 | 1968 | |
| Hermann Meyer-Lindenberg | | 1968 | 1974 | |
| Georg von Lilienfeld | | 1974 | 1977 | |
| Lothar Lahn | | 1977 | 1982 | |
| Guido Brunner | | 1982 | 1992 | |
| Hermann Huber | | 1992 | 1995 | |
| Henning Wegener | | 1995 | 1999 | |
| Joachim Bitterlich | | 1999 | 2002 | |
| Georg Boomgaarden | | 2003 | 2005 | |
| Wolf-Ruthart Born | | 2006 | 2009 | |
| Reinhard Silberberg | | 2009 | 2014 | |
| Peter Tempel | | 2014 | 2018 | |
| Wolfgang Dold | | 2018 | 2022 | |
| Maria Margarete Gosse | | 2022 | Present | |

== Ambassadors of the German Empire ==
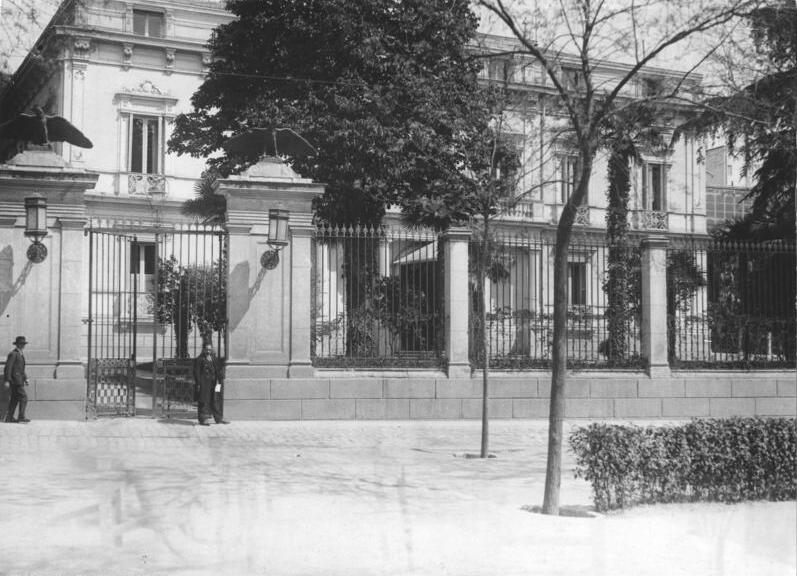
The German Embassy building in Madrid (about 1930) on the Paseo de la Castellana

| Name | Image | Term Start | Term End | Notes |
North German Confederation
| Julius von Canitz und Dallwitz | | 1867 | 1871 | From 1867: Prussian ambassador |
/ / / German Empire
| Julius von Canitz und Dallwitz | | 1871 | 1874 | |
| Paul von Hatzfeldt | | 1874 | 1878 | Envoy |
| Eberhard zu Solms-Sonnenwalde | | 1878 | 1887 | Envoy |
| Ferdinand Eduard von Stumm | | 1887 | 1892 | Envoy |
| Joseph Maria von Radowitz Jr. | | 1892 | 1908 | |
| Christian von Tattenbach | | 1908 | 1910 | |
| Max von Ratibor und Corvey | | 1910 | 1918 | |
| Vacant | | 1918 | 1920 | |
| Leopold von Hoesch | | 1920 | 1920 | Chargé d’Affaires from January to October 1920 |
| Ernst Langwerth von Simmern | | 1920 | 1925 | |
| Johannes von Welczeck | | 1926 | 1936 | |
April to July 1936: Eberhard von Stohrer received his letter of accreditation as ambassador on 24 July 1936, but did not hand it in to the government of the Spanish Republic because the German did not want to commit itself diplomatically to the putsch.
| Hans Hermann Völckers | | 1936 | 1939 | Chargé d'affaires |
| Wilhelm Faupel | | 1936 | 1937 | First consul general of the German Empire to Francisco Franco in Salamanca |
| Eberhard von Stohrer | | 1937 | 1942 | |
| Hans-Adolf von Moltke | | 1943 | 1943 | |
| Hans-Heinrich Dieckhoff | | 1943 | 1944 | |
| Sigismund von Bibra | | 1944 | 1945 | Chargé d'affaires from September 2, 1944 |
1945 to 1952: No relations

== Envoys of the German States (before 1871) ==
=== Hanoverian envoys ===
- 1863–1866: Adolf von Grote

=== Hanseatic envoys ===
| Name | Image | Term Start | Term End | Notes |
|---|---|---|---|---|
1649: Establishment of diplomatic relations
| Walter Delbrügge | | 1649 | 1697 | General Procurator and Plenipotentiary Minister |
| Joseph Delbrügge | | 1697 | 1725 | Agent and Minister Plenipotentiary, son of Walter Delbrügge |
| Joseph de Lauro | | 1725 | 1728 | Agent and Minister Plenipotentiary |
| Joseph Delbrügge | | 1729 | 1732 | Envoy and Minister Plenipotentiary |
| Isaac del Grado | | 1732 | 1739 | Envoy and Minister Plenipotentiary |
| Antoine de Conti | | 1739 | 1762 | Envoy and Minister Plenipotentiary |
| Johan Frans van der Lepe | | 1764 | 1796 | Envoy and Minister Plenipotentiary |
| Carl Andreoli | | 1796 | 1806 | Resident Minister, full-time Habsburg embassy secretary |
| Wilhelm Ferdinand von Genotte | | 1807 | 1809 | Resident minister, full-time from 1806 to 1809 |
1809 to 1814: Interruption of relations as a result of the Spanish War of Independence (Genotte withdrew to Cádiz)
| Wilhelm Ferdinand von Genotte | | 1814 | 1817 | Ministerial resident for Hamburg and Bremen |
| Johann von Provost | | 1817 | 1819 | Resident minister, full-time from 1817 to 1819 |
| Lazar von Brunetti | | 1819 | 1823 | Resident minister, full-time from 1819 to 1834 |
| Johann Frank von Negelsfürst | | 1823 | 1824 | |
| Lazar von Brunetti | | 1824 | 1834 | Resident minister, full-time from 1819 to 1834 |
| Johann von Reymond | | 1834 | 1837 | Resident minister, 1834 to 1836 full-time |
1837: Abolition of the ministerial residency, diplomatic representation by the German Empire from 1871

=== Prussian ambassadors ===
1782: Establishment of diplomatic relations

- 1810–1821: Heinrich Wilhelm von Werther
- 1821–1823: Daniel Andreas Berthold von Schepeler
- 1823–1824: Bogislaw von Maltzan
- 1824–1825: Peter Heinrich August von Salviati
- 1825–1835: August von Liebermann
- 1835–1848: Interruption of relations
- 1848–1852: Atanazy Raczyński
- 1853–1864: Ferdinand von Galen
- 1864–1867: Georg von Werthern
- 1867–1874: Julius von Canitz und Dallwitz

From 1867: Ambassador of the North German Confederation, from 1871: Ambassador of the German Empire

=== Saxon ambassadors ===
1739: Establishment of diplomatic relations

- 1739–1761: Johann Joseph Hyazinth von Kolowrat-Krakowsky
- 1761–1763: k. A
- 1763–1766: Johann Joseph Hyazinth von Kolowrat-Krakowsky
- 1766–1773: Friedrich Magnus von Saul

…

- 1788–1789: Sigismund Ehrenreich Johann von Redern

…

- 1811–1819: Vacant
- 1819–1820: Carl von Friesen
- 1820–1824: Friedrich Bernhard Biedermann
- 1824–1828: Hans Heinrich von Könneritz
- 1828–1852: Interruption of relations
- 1852–1853: Oswald von Fabrice
- 1853–1856: Adolph Keil
- 1856–1870: Vacant

1870: Dissolution of the embassy

== See also ==
- Germany–Spain relations
- Foreign relations of Germany
- List of ambassadors of Spain to Germany
