= Louis Krevel =

German painter (1801–1876)

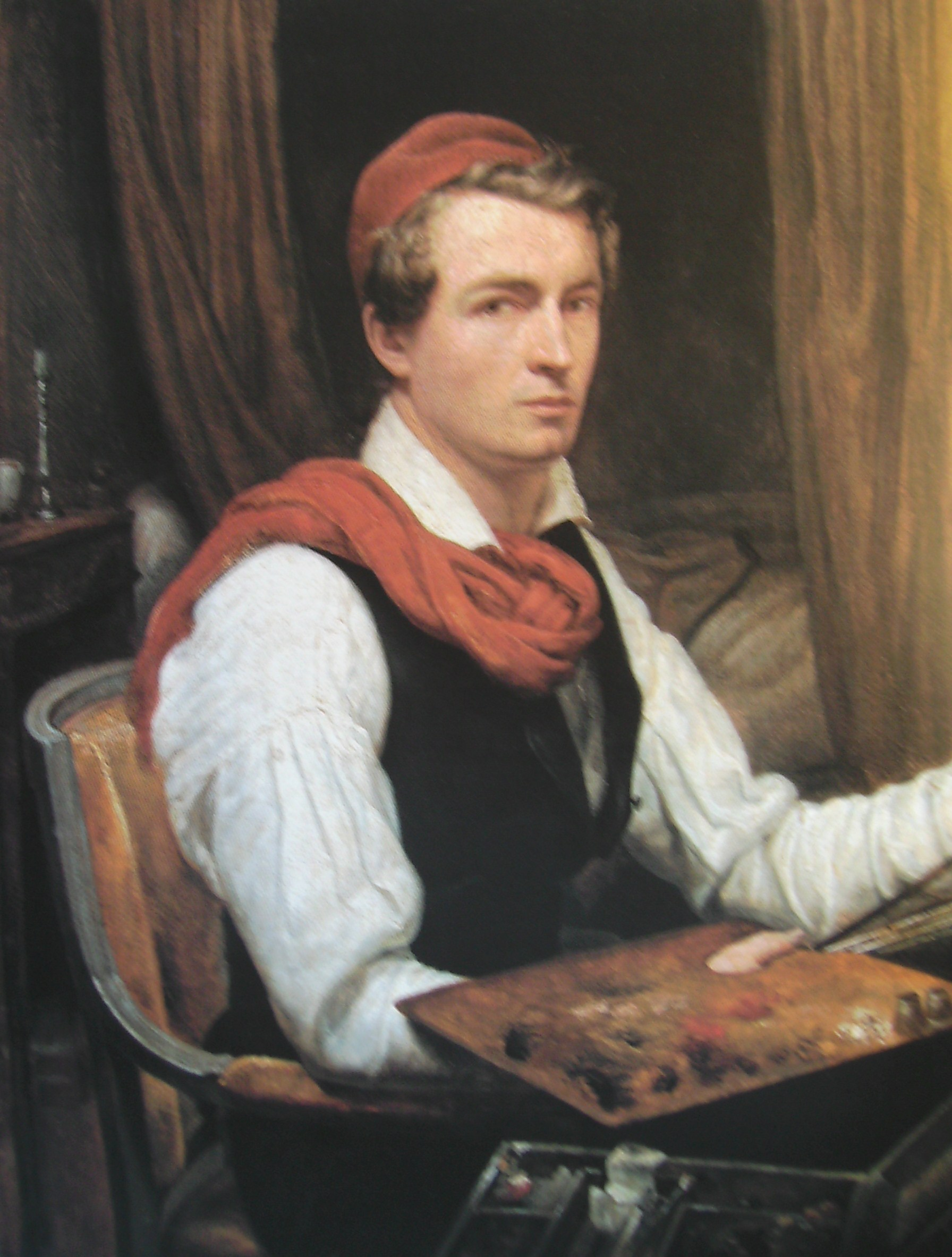
Self-portrait (1827)

Friedrich Heinrich Ludwig Krevel, known as Louis Krevel (19 September 1801, Braunschweig – 14 May 1876, Trier) was a German portrait painter of the Biedermeier period.

== Biography ==
His father, Johann Hilarius Krevel (1776–1846) was an art dealer and portrait painter of some note who experimented with new methods of producing lithographs. After taking his first art lessons from his father, he studied with Justus Krauskopf, a portrait and landscape painter who had a private school in Kassel and was himself a student of Jacques-Louis David. Through Krauskopf's contacts, in 1824, Krevel was able to go study in Paris. While there, he may have worked with Antoine-Jean Gros and was influenced by the works of Ingres.

In 1827, one of his portraits was accepted for the Salon. The followed year, he opened his own studio and his name appeared in the Almanach des 25.000 adresses des principaux habitants de Paris. As a result, he received a commission from the town of Sète to make a copy of a painting by François Gérard, depicting the 1825 coronation of Charles X. His portraits did not provide sufficient income, however, so he also worked as a decorative painter.

In 1830, he decided to return to Germany and appears to have worked in Nordrhein-Westfalen. By 1836, he was working in the Saar region and, four years later, was exhibiting at the Prussian Academy of Arts. His works were praised by Christian Daniel Rauch, who tried to persuade him to move to Berlin. Krevel apparently preferred the lack of competition where he was. Based on the locations of his showings, he spent most of his time in Baden-Baden but travelled frequently as his commissions dictated. Most of his clients were from the newly thriving bourgeoisie created by the industrialization of the Saar. Some of the most notable were Adolf Kraemer and his family (iron); the Stumm brothers and their heirs (coal) and Heinrich Böcking (coal and iron).

Sometime in the mid-1840s, he settled in Cologne and became a member of the Kölnischer Kunstverein. Through his friendship with Jakob Götzenberger, he also maintained contact with the kunstverein in Mannheim. In 1856, he participated in another exhibit at the Prussian Academy.

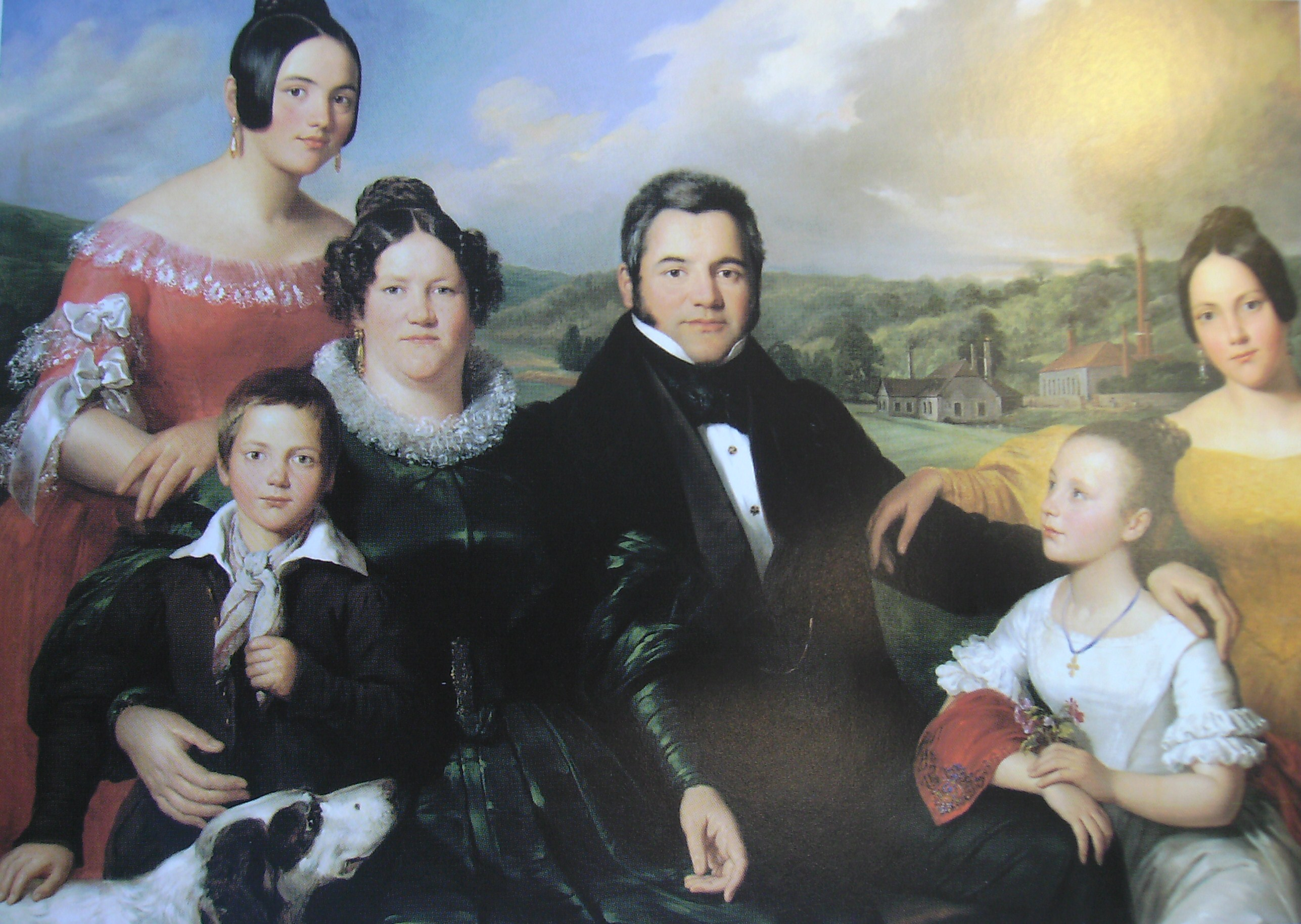
The Kraemer Family (with their ironworks at Sankt Ingbert in the background)

In 1865, discouraged by the growing popularity of portrait photography, he retired from painting, became withdrawn and moved to a small house in Freiburg im Breisgau. He suffered a stroke in 1873 and moved to Trier to live with his sister, Jenny, who was newly widowed. His health continued to deteriorate and he died there three years later.
