= Ferdinand Carl von Stumm =

German diplomat and industrialist (1880–1954)

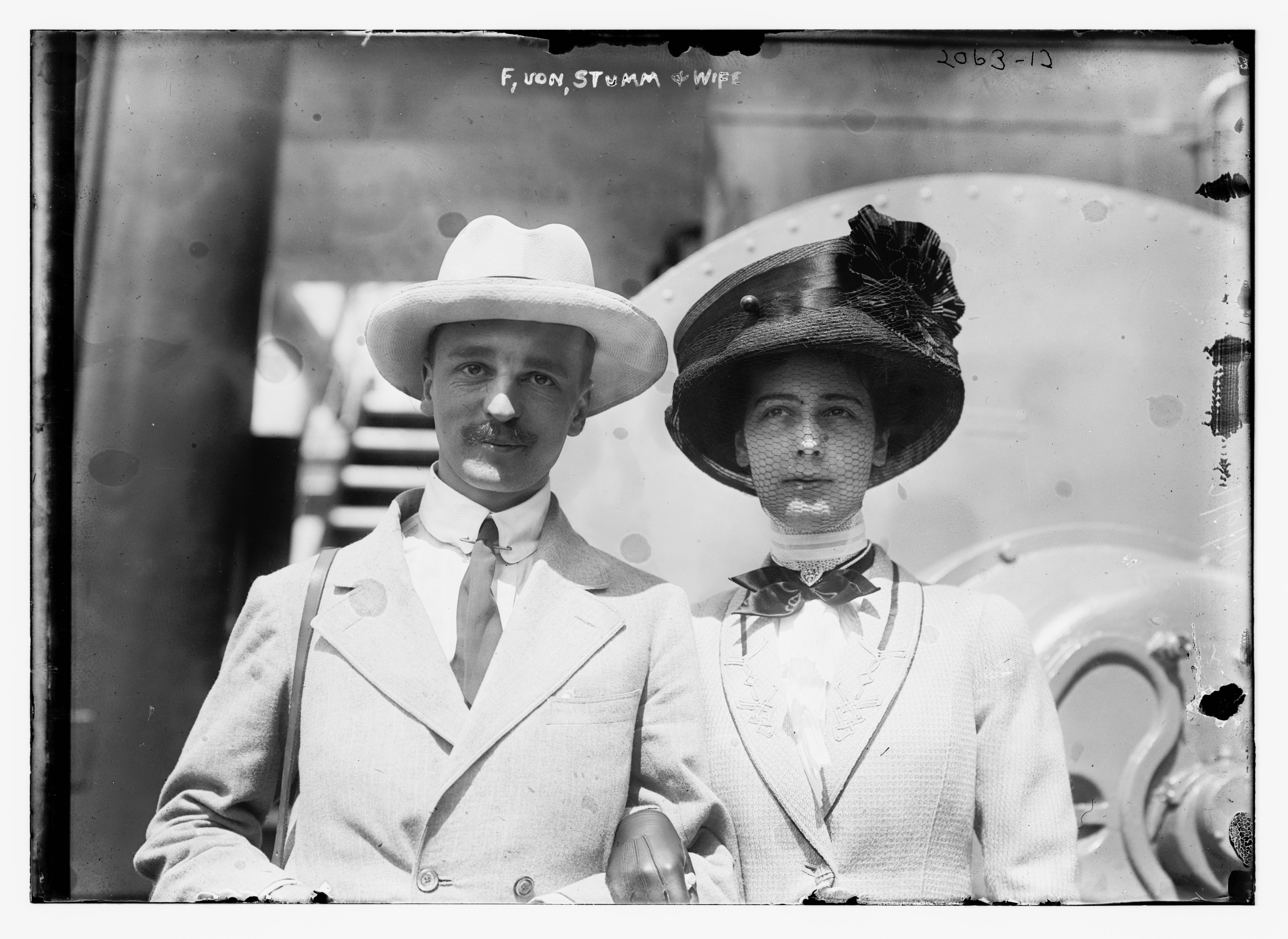
Baron and Baroness von Stumm

Ferdinand Carl, Freiherr von Stumm (28 June 1880 – 24 March 1954) was a German diplomat and industrialist.

== Early life ==
Stumm was born on 28 June 1880 in Saint Petersburg, Russia, where his father was secretary of the German legation. He was the eldest son of the diplomat and industrialist Ferdinand Eduard von Stumm (1843–1925) and the American heiress, Pauline von Hoffmann (1858–1950). His younger sister, Baroness Maria von Stumm, married Prince Paul Hermann Karl Hubert von Hatzfeldt (son of the Ambassador to England Paul von Hatzfeldt). His younger brothers were Baron Herbert Wilhelm von Stumm (who married Alice Schuchard), and Baron Friedrich Wilhelm von Stumm (who married Laurette Luise von Stülpnagel).

His maternal grandparents were Athenais (née Grymes) von Hoffmann and Louis von Hoffmann, a wealthy New York banker who was one of the founders of the Knickerbocker Club. His maternal aunt, Medora von Hoffmann married the Marquis de Mores. His paternal grandfather was Carl Friedrich Stumm and his uncle was Carl Ferdinand von Stumm-Halberg.

After graduating from high school in Kassel, he studied law and political science at the Universities of Oxford, Geneva, Strasbourg and Bonn as well as the Cologne Business School.

== Career ==
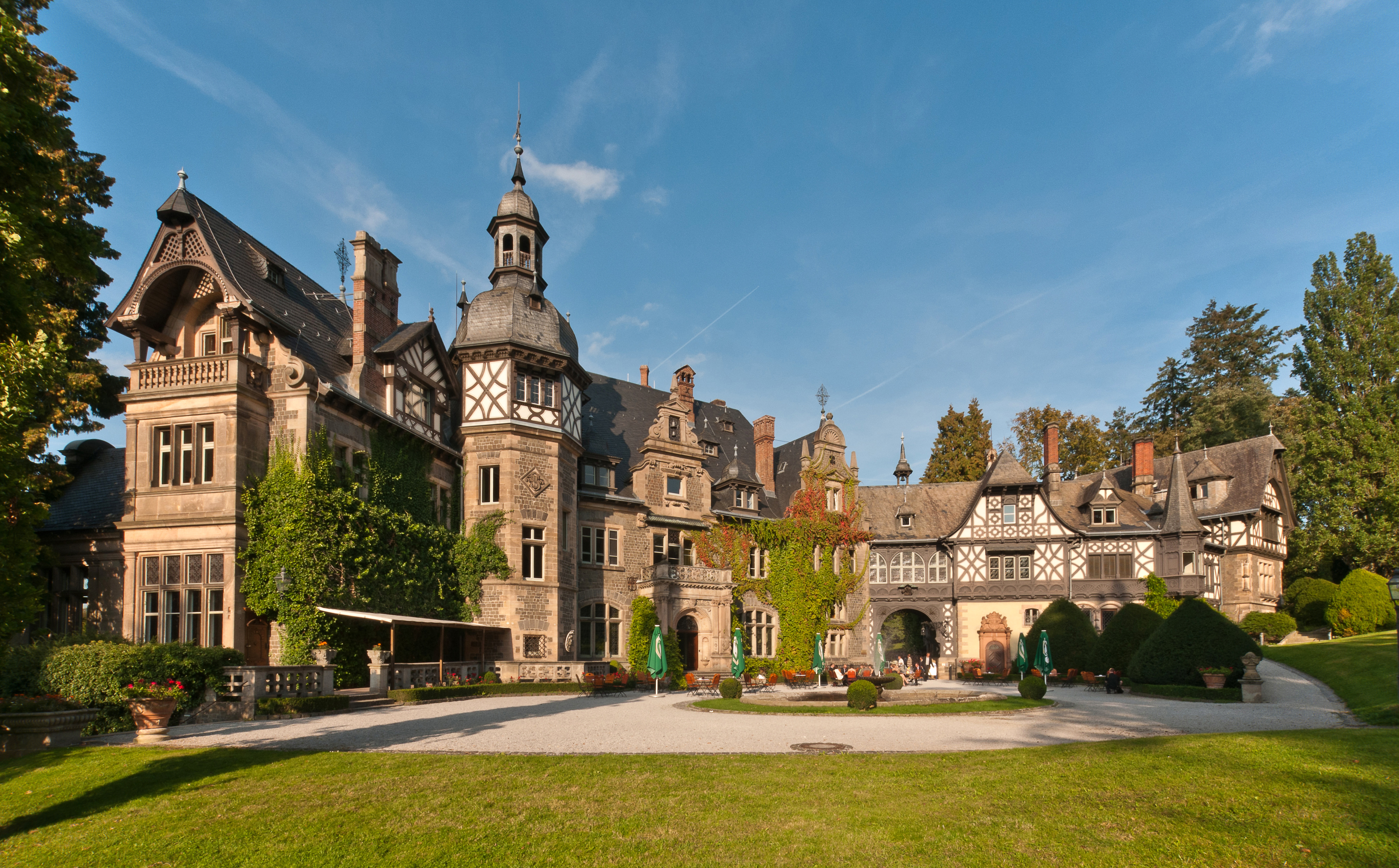
Rauischholzhausen Castle

In 1901 he became a member of the German Student Corps called the Corps Palaio-Alsatia in Strasbourg. After completing his studies, he worked as an attaché in the Foreign Office. From 1905 to 1917 as embassy or embassy secretary in Washington, D.C., Constantinople, Belgrade and Rome, among others. He was friendly with Lord Haldane while he was British Secretary of State for War. Until the end of 1918 he was head of Department IV (News) in the Foreign Office with the rank of Ministerial Director. In 1907, while Councillor of the German Embassy, Baron von Stumm was blamed for a candid interview with German Emperor Wilhelm II published in Hulton's Daily Dispatch (of which the authenticity was questioned). Von Stumm "had to leave the hunting trip he was on with Reid to manage the ensuing 'mess'" as relayed by American Ambassador Reid to President Theodore Roosevelt.

In 1919 he resigned from the diplomatic service as a legation councilor and from then on lived in Neunkirchen so he could oversee his board membership in the family-owned Stumm group. He was a member of the supervisory board of the family ironworks, Neunkircher Eisenwerke AG, Homburger Eisenwerk AG and Heydt's Bank AG in Berlin, as well as a member of the board of the coal mine Zeche Minister Achenbach.

After his father's death in 1925, he became the owner of Schloss Rauischholzhausen, the 700 hectares (1,700 acres) manor in Ebsdorfergrund, Marburg-Biedenkopf, Hesse (which his father had acquired in 1873). In 1928 he left Neunkirchen and from then on lived in Ascona, Locarno (on the shore of Lake Maggiore in Switzerland) or at Schloss Rauischholzhausen. In 1938 and 1941 he sold the Rauischholzhausen estate, schloss and park.

== Personal life ==
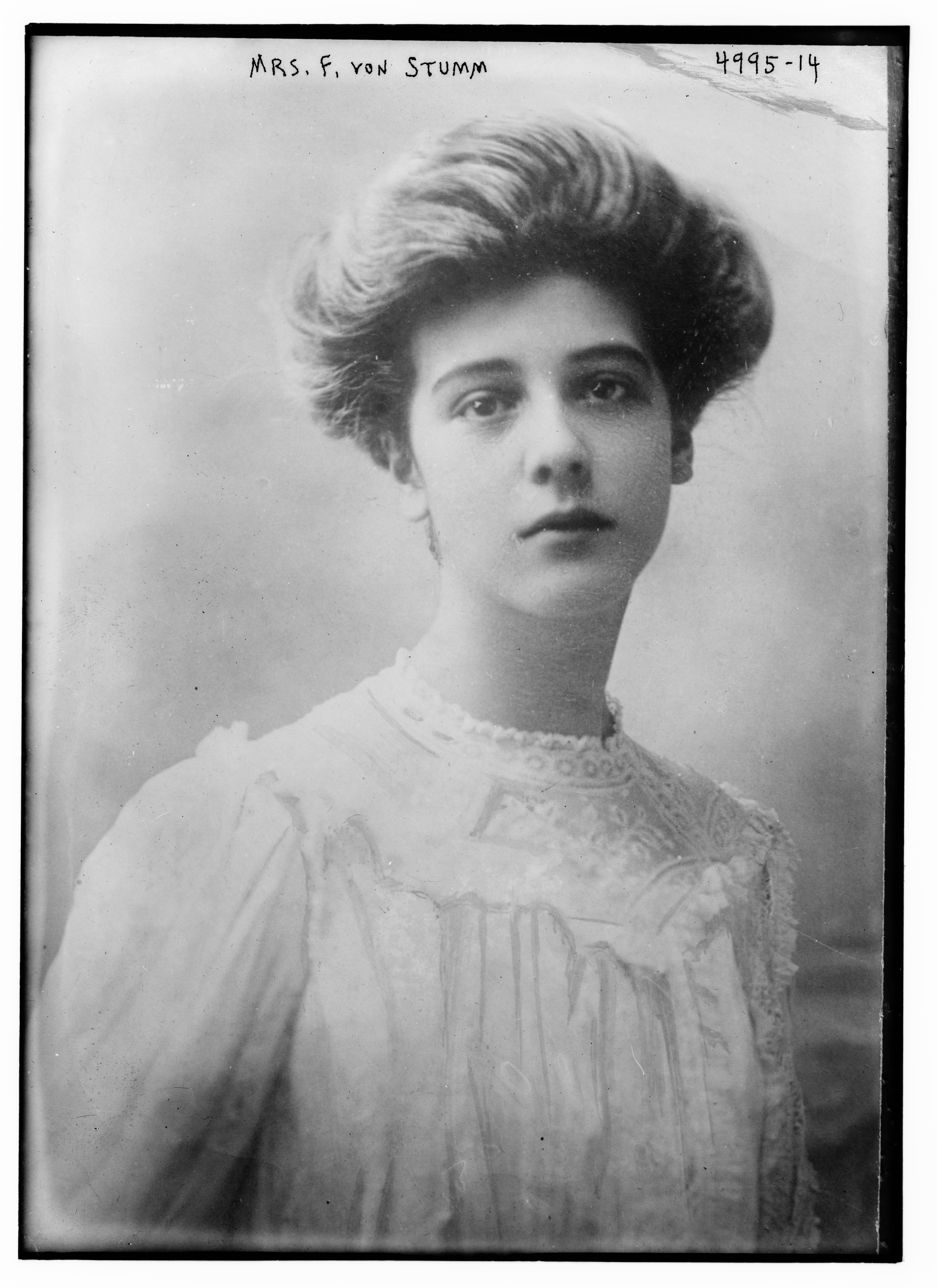
His first wife, Constance Hoyt, 1915

On 30 March 1910, Baron von Stumm married American heiress Constance Hoyt (20 May 1889 – 30 July 1923), daughter of Solicitor General Henry Hoyt Jr. and Anne McMichael (a granddaughter of Philadelphia Mayor Morton McMichael). Her paternal grandfather was Pennsylvania Governor Henry M. Hoyt. Their wedding was attended by then President of the United States William Howard Taft. Before her death in 1923, they were the parents of:

- Baroness Nora von Stumm (1916–2000), who married, as his second wife, Count Hyacinth Strachwitz in 1947 in Holzhausen.

After the death of his first wife, he married Vera von Platen (16 August 1900 – 9 February 1952, née Baroness von Wolff), daughter of Baron Nikolaus Boris von Wolff, and former wife of Karl Gustav von Platen, on 17 May 1926. From her first marriage, she had a son, Dr. Alexander-Christoph von Platen. Together, they were the parents of one son:

- Baron Nikolaus Paul Wilhelm von Stumm (1928–1991), who married Baroness Ursula von Pfetten-Arnbach, a daughter of Baron Maximilian von Pfetten-Arnbach and Countess Marie-Elizabeth von Harrach (daughter of sculptor Count Hans Albrecht von Harrach and granddaughter of artist Count Ferdinand von Harrach).

Baron von Stumm died on 24 March 1954 in Grafenaschau near Murnau.
