= Constance, Baroness von Stumm =

American heiress and German baroness

Constance von Stumm
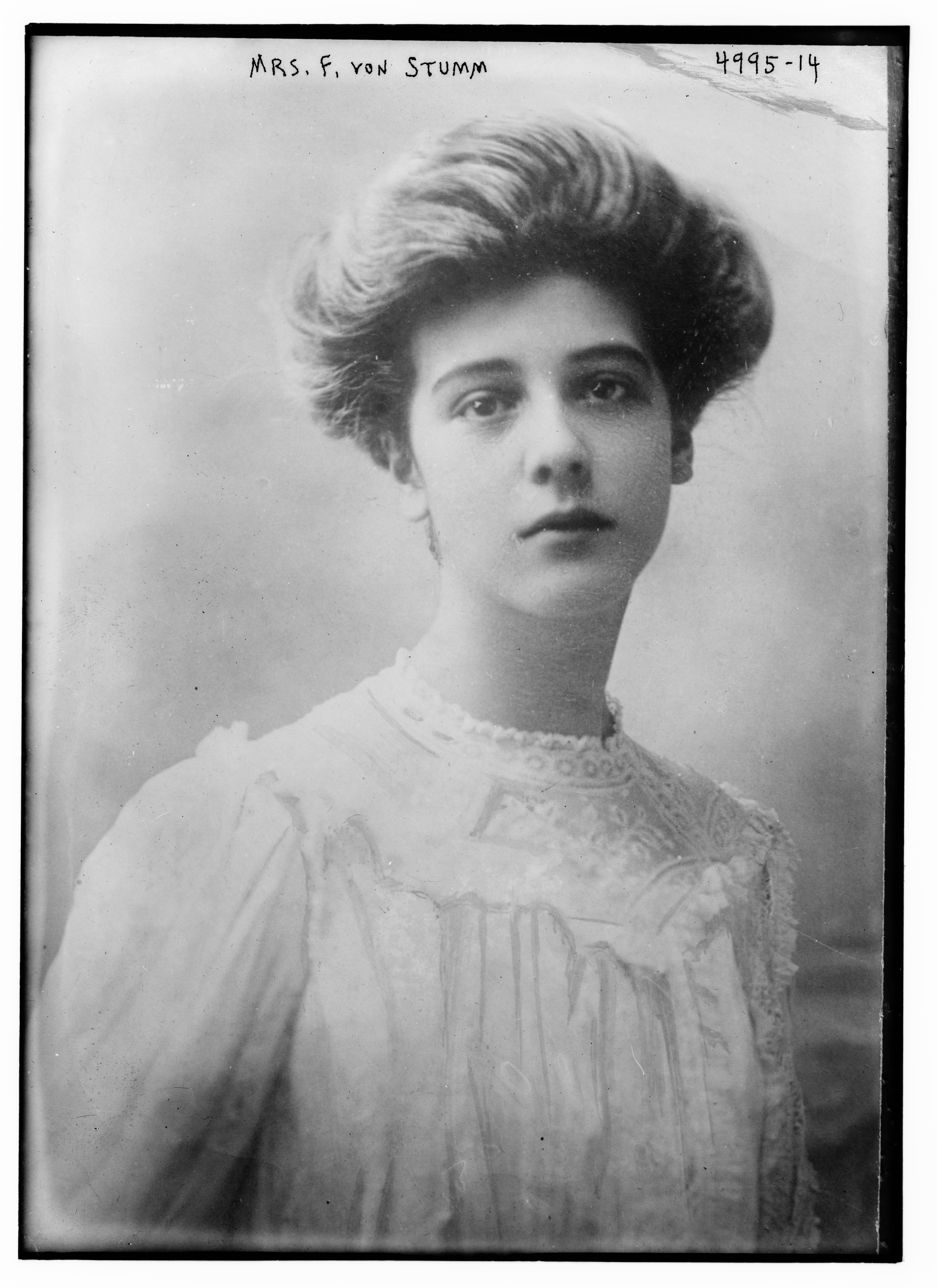
- The Baroness von Stumm, 1915
- Born: Constance Hoyt; May 20, 1889; Philadelphia, Pennsylvania, U.S.
- Died: July 30, 1923 (aged 34); Bavaria, Germany
- Spouse: Baron Ferdinand Carl von Stumm (m. 1910)
- Children: Nora von Stumm
- Parent(s): Henry Martyn Hoyt Jr. Anne Morton McMichael
- Relatives: Elinor Wylie (sister); Henry M. Hoyt (grandfather)

Constance von Stumm (née Hoyt; May 20, 1889 – July 30, 1923) was an American heiress who married into a German aristocratic family.

== Early life ==
Constance was born on May 20, 1889, in Philadelphia, Pennsylvania. She was the third of five children born to Henry Martyn Hoyt Jr. (1856–1910) and Anne Morton (née McMichael) Hoyt (1862–1949). Her elder siblings were the poet Elinor Wylie and artist Henry Martyn Hoyt III (who also committed suicide); her younger siblings were Morton McMichael Hoyt, and novelist Nancy McMichael Hoyt.

Her paternal grandfather was Henry Martyn Hoyt, the Governor of Pennsylvania from 1879 to 1883. Her maternal grandfather was Col. Morton McMichael Jr., "one of the foremost citizens of Philadelphia" who was president of the First National Bank of Philadelphia and a son of Mayor Morton McMichael.

== Personal life ==
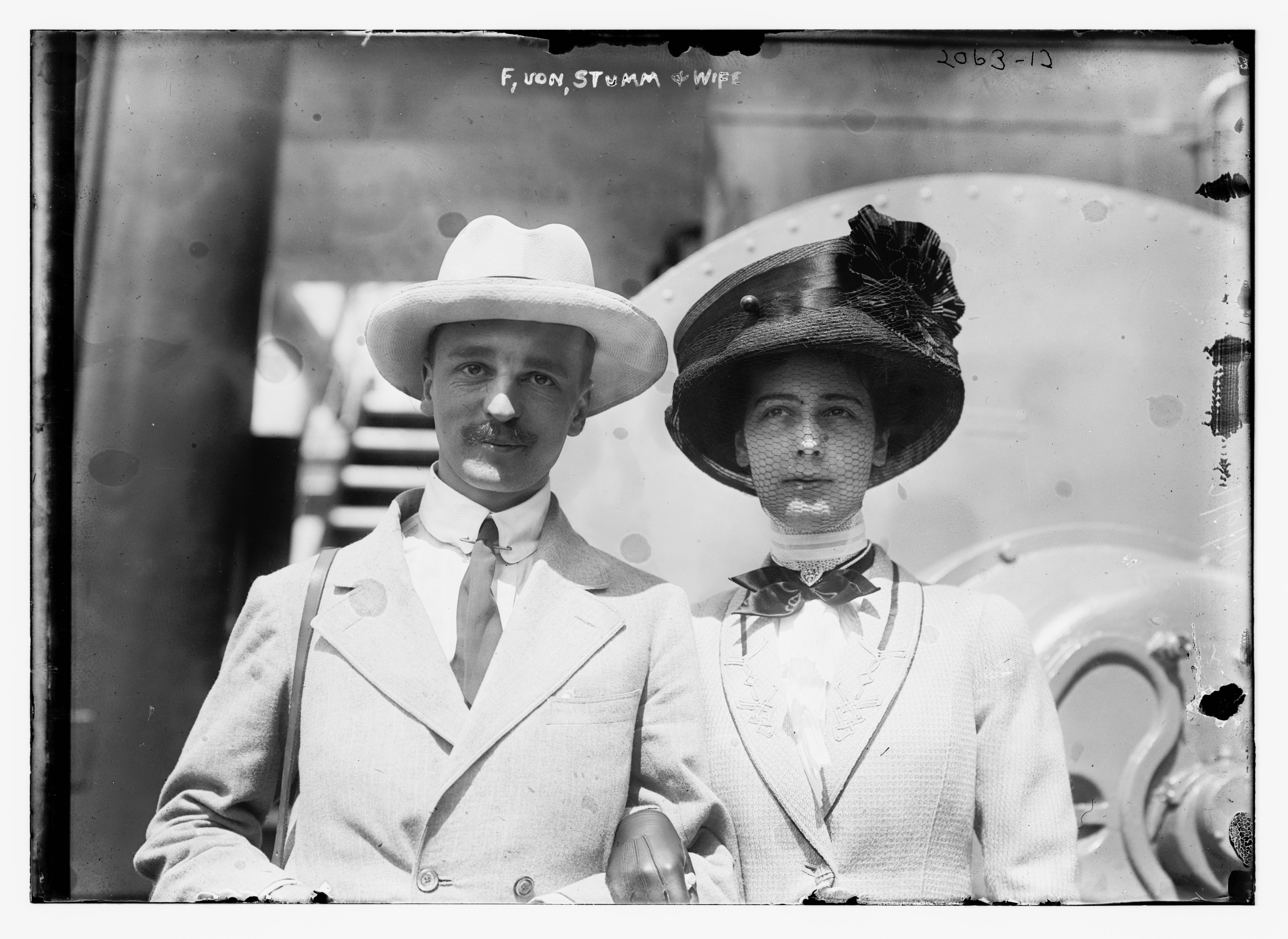
Baron and Baroness von Stumm

On March 30, 1910, Constance married German diplomat, Baron Ferdinand Carl von Stumm (1880–1954) in Washington, D.C. in a ceremony attended by President William Howard Taft. Together, they were the parents of:

- Nora von Stumm (1916–2000), who married Count Hyacinth Strachwitz.

Baron von Stumm's father was Baron Ferdinand Eduard von Stumm. His sister, Maria von Stumm, married Prince Hermann von Hatzfeld (a son of the German Ambassador to the United Kingdom, Paul von Hatzfeldt, and his wife, Helene Moulton, an American).

The Baroness von Stumm committed suicide on July 30, 1923, at age 34, in Bavaria, Germany.
