= 1878 Pennsylvania gubernatorial election =

- November 5, 1878
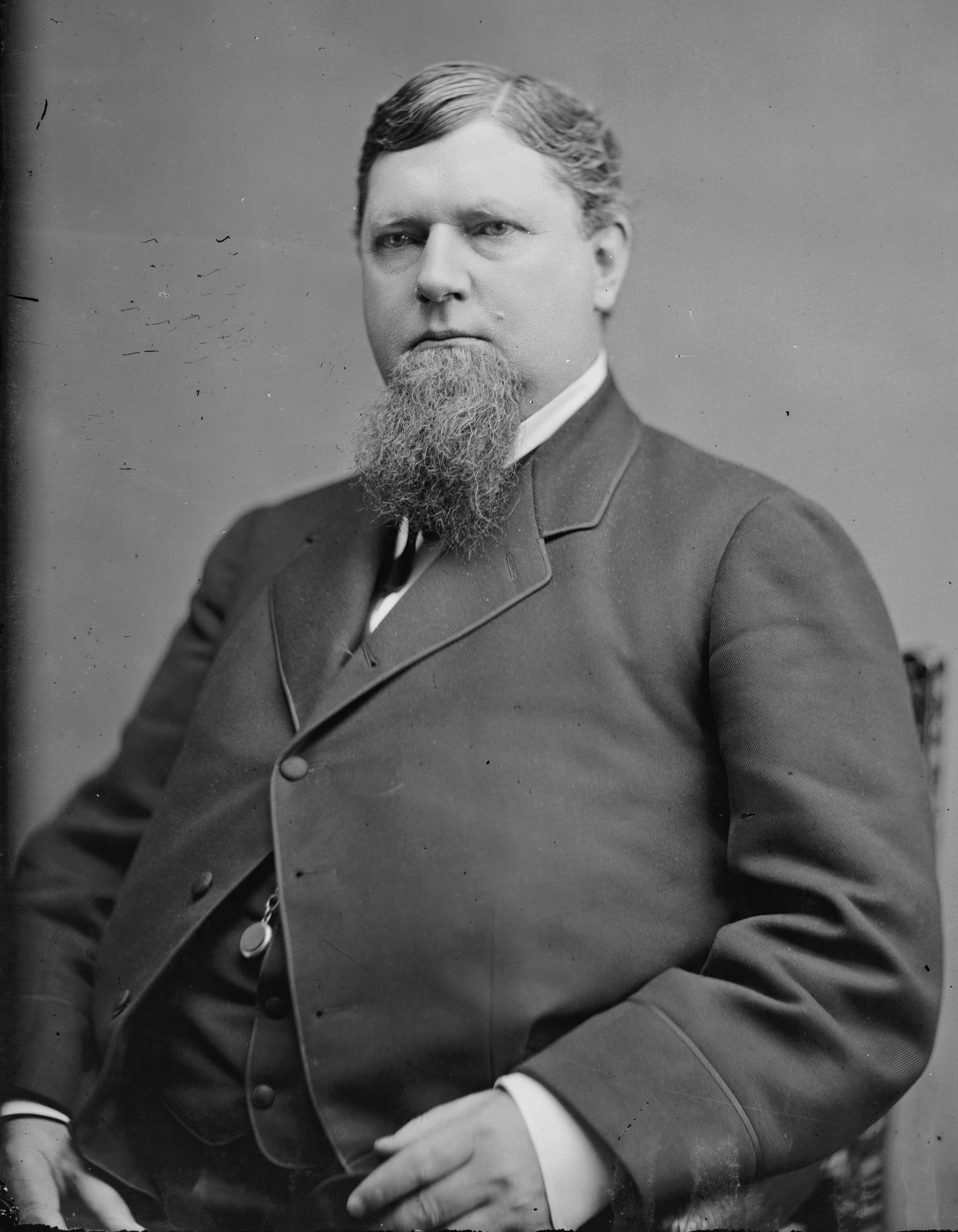

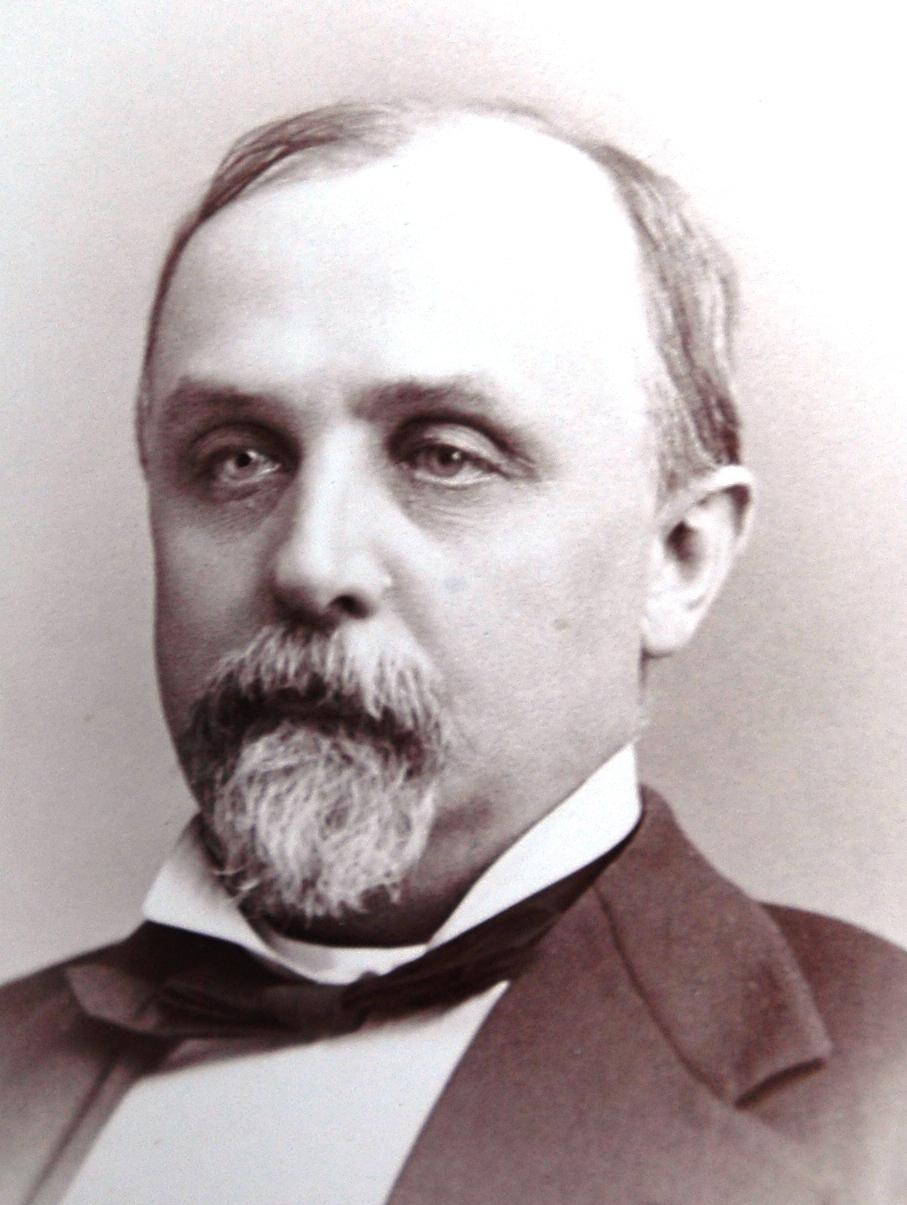

Nominee	Henry M. Hoyt	Andrew H. Dill	Samuel R. Mason
Party	Republican	Democratic	Greenback
Popular vote	319,567	297,060	81,758
Percentage	45.52%	42.31%	11.65%
- County results Handy: 40–50% 50–60% 60–70% Dill: 30–40% 40–50% 50–60% 60–70% 70–80%
Governor before election
John F. Hartranft
Republican
Elected Governor
Henry M. Hoyt
Republican

The 1878 Pennsylvania gubernatorial election occurred on November 5, 1878. Incumbent governor John F. Hartranft, a Republican, was not a candidate for re-election.

The Republican candidate, Henry M. Hoyt, defeated Democratic candidate Andrew H. Dill and Greenback candidate Samuel R. Mason to become Governor of Pennsylvania.

This election extended the governor's term from three to four years.

== Results ==
Pennsylvania gubernatorial election, 1878
Party	Candidate	Votes	%
Republican	Henry M. Hoyt	319,567	45.52
Democratic	Andrew H. Dill	297,060	42.31
Greenback	Samuel R. Mason	81,758	11.65
Prohibition	Franklin H. Lane	3,653	0.52
Total votes		702,038	100.00
