= Lloyd Wheaton Bowers =

American lawyer (1859–1910)

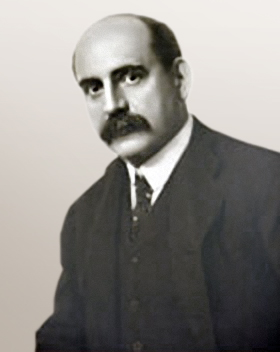

12th Solicitor General of the United States
- In office April 1, 1909 – September 9, 1910
- President: William H. Taft
- Preceded by: Henry M. Hoyt
- Succeeded by: Frederick W. Lehmann

Personal details
- Born: March 9, 1859 Springfield, Massachusetts, U.S.
- Died: September 9, 1910 (aged 51) Boston, Massachusetts, U.S.
- Party: Republican
- Education: Yale University (BA); Columbia University (LLB)

Lloyd Wheaton Bowers (March 9, 1859 – September 9, 1910) was an American lawyer.

== Life and career ==
Bowers was born in Springfield, Massachusetts, the son of Samuel Dwight Bowers and Martha Wheaton Dowd. On both sides, his ancestors were Puritans who had settled in New England more than two centuries before his birth.

His family moved to Brooklyn, New York, and later to Elizabeth, New Jersey, where he was tutored privately in preparation for college. Entering Yale in 1875, he graduated valedictorian of his class in 1879, where he was a member of Skull and Bones. For one year he remained a graduate student, then traveled in Europe, and despite an offer to teach at Yale University, he turned to the law profession. He graduated from the Columbia Law School, was admitted to the New York bar, and received a clerkship from a leading firm in New York City in 1882.

His efforts earned him the position of managing clerk in one year, and in 1884, he became a member of the firm. Ill health compelled him to rest, and as a result of travel to the Northwest he moved to Winona, Minnesota, in October 1884. There he formed a partnership with Thomas Wilson, former chief justice of the Minnesota Supreme Court, where he practiced law until 1893. He then became the general counsel of the Chicago & North Western Railway Company, one of the great railway systems of the country, and in this office he served until 1909, when he was appointed by President Taft, an intimate friend since college and fellow Bonesman, Solicitor General of the United States.

The years of his work with the North Western were a period of extraordinary industrial development. Incidentally to this development litigation arose involving federal control of the railroads under the Interstate Commerce Act of 1887, the powers of the states to control intrastate commerce and to tax corporations, and the Sherman Anti-Trust Act of 1890. Bowers success in winning cases for the government during his brief service as solicitor general was phenomenal. He found great joy, as solicitor general, in the fact that he could act solely as lawyer, rather than counsel, and for the whole country rather than for a special interest. Only his death prevented his nomination by President Taft for appointment to the U.S. Supreme Court.

He retained throughout his life a catholicity of intellectual interests, particularly in literature. Art and music, in his later years, also became avid interests. Notwithstanding some reserve, his charm of manner, marked by kindly sympathy, easily won him friends. He married twice; first on September 7, 1887, to Louisa Bennett Wilson of Winona, Minnesota, who died on December 20, 1897; and second in 1906, to Charlotte Josephine Lewis of Detroit, who survived him after his death, aged 51. Lloyd and Louisa's daughter Martha Wheaton Bowers married Robert Alphonso Taft, elder son of President William Howard Taft and Helen Louise "Nellie" Herron.

He left no published works.

Legal offices
Preceded by Henry M. Hoyt	Solicitor General; 1909–1910	Succeeded by Frederick William Lehmann
