= 52nd Pennsylvania Infantry Regiment =

52nd Pennsylvania Volunteer Infantry
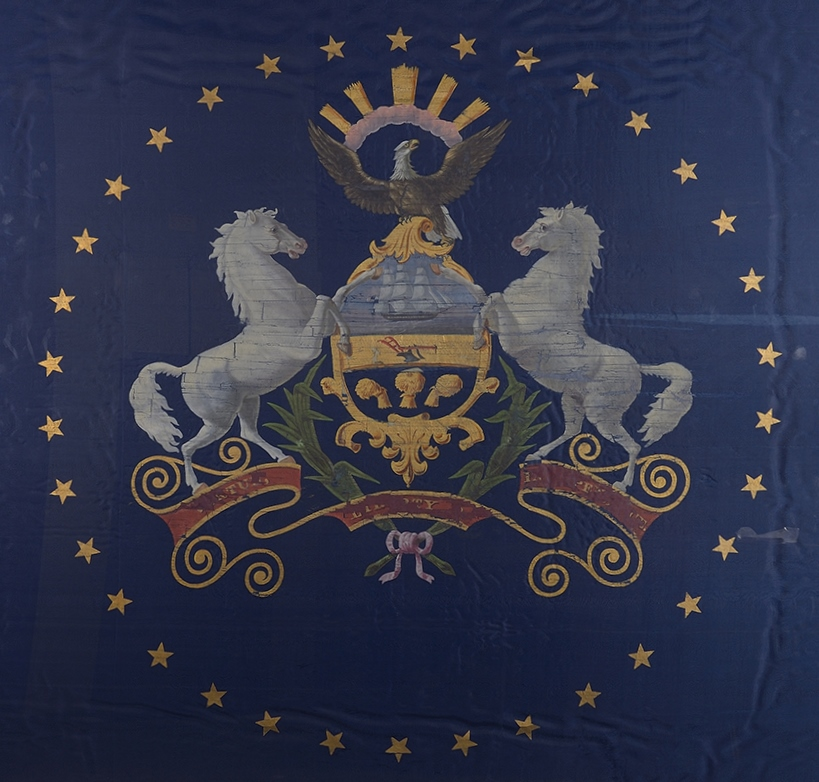
- Pennsylvania flag
- Active: August 1861 – July 12, 1865
- Country: United States
- Allegiance: Union
- Branch: Infantry
- Engagements: Battle of Williamsburg; Battle of Seven Pines; Second Battle of Fort Wagner; Carolinas campaign

The 52nd Pennsylvania Infantry was a volunteer infantry regiment in the Union Army during the American Civil War.

== History ==
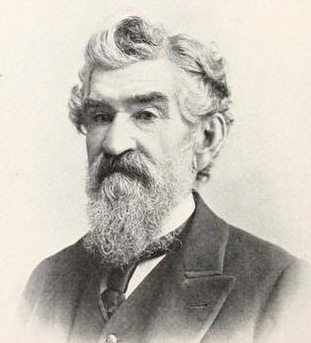
Col. John C. Dodge, Jr., c. 1900.

Formed in response to President Abraham Lincoln's calls, during the spring and summer of 1861, for volunteers to enroll for military service, the 52nd Regiment, Pennsylvania Volunteer Infantry was composed primarily of men from Bradford, Clinton, Columbia, Luzerne, Union and Wyoming counties of Pennsylvania. Authority to recruit men for the regiment had been granted by Pennsylvania Governor Andrew Curtin on August 1, 1861, to Lycoming County resident John C. Dodge, Jr., who had performed his three months' service during the opening months of the American Civil War.

Following their muster-in at Camp Curtin in Harrisburg, Dauphin County, the members of this regiment engaged in basic training at this Union Army camp until November 8, 1861. While stationed here, John C. Dodge, Jr., Henry M. Hoyt, and John B. Conyngham were commissioned as field and staff officers on October 7, and awarded the respective ranks of colonel, lieutenant colonel, and major. The 52nd Pennsylvania also initially had its own regimental band, a 16-piece ensemble staffed by members of the Wyoming Cornet Band from Wilkes-Barre, which was under the baton of Professor Fred Wagner. As the 52nd readied for departure, Governor Curtin presented regimental leaders with state and national flags to be carried by the regiment's color-bearer unit.

On November 8, 1861, the regiment marched to the train station at Harrisburg, and was then transported to Washington, D.C. by way of York, Pennsylvania, and Baltimore and Relay Junction, Maryland. Upon arrival in Washington, the 52nd Pennsylvania Volunteers were marched to the Kalorama Heights in Georgetown, where they made camp at "Camp Kalorama," and received additional training.

=== 1862 ===
Ordered into winter quarters, the 52nd Pennsylvania Volunteers were housed in barracks "on Meridian Hill, at Fourteenth street, in the rear of Columbia College," according to Bates. While here, they continued to perform in a series of dress parades as part of their ongoing training. Illness plagued the regiment during this phase of service with a number of 52nd Pennsylvanians contracting typhoid fever or variola (smallpox); several died. The regiment's ranks were further thinned when 10 men volunteered for gunboat service on detached duty (many of whom were then killed in June 1862 while serving aboard the steamer USS Mound City during the Battle of Saint Charles, Arkansas).

In March 1862, the regiment was assigned to the 1st Brigade, 3rd Division, IV Corps of the Army of the Potomac, and on the 28th of that month, moved out with its brigade. Marching for Alexandria, Virginia, the regiment boarded the steamship USS Constitution, which ran aground twice after departing from that city's docks. Following their arrival at Hampton Roads, the regiment transferred to a smaller steamer, the USS Hero, which took them to Newport News. During their trip, the 52nd Pennsylvanians were fired upon by a Confederate artillery battery stationed on Craney Island, but escaped without damage to the ship or injury to the men. According to Bates, on April 17, the 52nd Pennsylvania and its brigade "advanced and took position in front of the enemy's lines at Lee's Mills, Smith's Division on the right, and Couch's on the left" with the "main operations of the siege ... directed against his fortifications at Yorktown."

Now part of the Peninsula Campaign, the 52nd Pennsylvania saw its first serious combat action in the Battle of Williamsburg on May 5, 1862. Assigned to point at the head of a Union Army column marching on Fort Magruder, part of the regiment was caught in an explosion of an improvised explosive device (IED). According to Bates, General Henry M. Naglee, his staff, and members of the 52nd's A Company had just crossed a parapet at the fort "when a torpedo, which had been skillfully planted in the way, exploded under Company F, instantly killing one man [Private John Pruyne of F Company], and horribly mutilating six [or nine] others."

On May 20, General Naglee selected one hundred men from the 52nd Pennsylvania, designated them as sharpshooters, and placed them under the command of Captain Greanleaf Davis, commanding officer of the 52nd's E Company. Although this detachment came under heavy musket and artillery fire while assigned to reconnaissance of Bottom's Bridge and neighboring rail lines, it was able to maintain control of its assigned area, enabling Union forces to cross the Chickahominy River just 14 miles outside of Richmond.

During the evening of May 23, General George B. McClellan ordered General Naglee to move his army toward Seven Pines with these words:

Your instructions for the reconnaissance today, are as follows: You will, if possible, advance to the Seven Pines, on the forks of the direct road to Richmond, and the road turning to the right into the road leading from New Bridge to Richmond, and hold that point if practicable.... You will push the reconnaissance as far towards Richmond as practicable, without incurring too much danger.

In response, the 52nd Pennsylvania Volunteers, under the command of Colonel Dodge, departed early the next morning. They were accompanied by the 104th Pennsylvania, which was commanded by Colonel Davis. Joining up with them at 8 a.m. were the 1st New York Artillery's 2nd battery and Regan's 7th Independent New York battery. With the new column formed, the men moved out onto the Williamsburg road at 9 a.m. At Creek Run, roughly 1.5 miles from Bottom's Bridge, they encountered and chased off a group of Confederate pickets. As they progressed further, more CSA pickets were encountered, as were five regiments of Tennessee infantrymen who were part of Hatton's Brigade, and infantrymen and artillerymen under the command of General J. E. B. Stuart. Naglee ordered the 104th Pennsylvania to move to the left of the Williamsburg road and the 52nd Pennsylvania to the right of the road while also extending itself across the railroad. Advancing, they made it as far as a forested area just past Savage Station, where they encountered a much heavier enemy presence. Naglee then moved Regan's battery to the right at the front edge of the forest, from which it shelled the woods on the road's left side. The 52nd Pennsylvania, also on the right, was ordered to move forward to a farm and orchard nearby, where its men could take shelter in and behind the buildings and fence on the property. The shelling and troop movements "lessened materially the fire of the enemy on the left," according to Bates, enabling the 104th Pennsylvania to then also move forward. At 1 p.m., Gregg's Cavalry joined the Union force with Mink's artillery battery connecting with the group later that afternoon.

Roughly a half mile outside of Seven Pines Corner, both regiments were subjected to withering fire from the enemy. The wood in front of the 52nd Pennsylvania was particularly thick with CSA skirmishers. In response, Naglee ordered the 104th Pennsylvania to fire obliquely on the enemy while the 52nd Pennsylvania continued its direct fire on CSA troops. Directing the 85th Pennsylvania to move forward to a position behind the railroad, he then ordered the 52nd Pennsylvania to "advance from the fence and buildings directly into the wood in front of it," which "forced the enemy to leave precipitately the wood on the right." At 4 p.m., Naglee directed the sharpshooters of the 52nd Pennsylvania to target enemy artillerymen; within 30 minutes, the fire from CSA batteries was significantly reduced, prompting CSA forces to retreat. Naglee then moved Gregg's Cavalry, part of Mink's Battery, the 85th New York, 104th Pennsylvania, and 52nd Pennsylvania forward, further scattering CSA troops. Naglee was then ordered by General Keyes to have his men stand down in order to prevent a larger scale engagement with the enemy.

Ordering the sharpshooters from the 52nd Pennsylvania to advance during the early afternoon of May 25, Naglee then moved the 11th Maine, 104th Pennsylvania, two sections of Bailey's Artillery, and remainder of the 52 Pennsylvania forward in support of the sharpshooters who had advanced to a forested area 500 yards beyond Seven Pines in a "line extended perpendicular to the Williamsburg road, and across to the neighborhood of the Fair Oak Station," according to a report made later by Naglee, who added that he then "ordered the artillery to open upon the enemy," who were "forming in the open fields beyond the wood pile." Advancing his pickets toward the sharpshooters, Naglee then also moved the 11th Maine and 104th Pennsylvania forward, which prompted another CSA retreat. The next day, he continued his advance, moving his troops within five miles of Richmond. On May 27, he then ordered the sharpshooters of the 52nd Pennsylvania to advance yet again, which they did, reaching Garnett's field along the Chickahomony River. The 52nd Pennsylvania was then ordered to make camp "on the Nine Mile road, a half mile beyond Fair Oaks, as a support to the pickets along Garnett's field."

Sometime during the opening days of the aforementioned engagement, Private Dilton "Sid" Taylor of the 52nd Pennsylvania's G Company was wounded seriously enough to require medical treatment and a period of convalescence after which he was honorably discharged on a surgeon's certificate of disability on September 16, 1862.

The next major interaction with the enemy by the 52nd Pennsylvania came during the Battle of Seven Pines (also known as the Battle of Fair Oaks) from May 30 to June 1, 1862. Stationed a half mile in front of and to the right of Seven Pines, this location brought the 52nd "into action on a different part of the field from the other regiments of the brigade, and at a somewhat later hour," according to Bates, who noted that by the time the 52nd Pennsylvania was involved, CSA troops had already "turned the left flank" of the other Union troops at Fair Oaks, "broken through on the Williamsburg road," and opened up a "destructive cross-fire" on Naglee's main force. In response, the 23rd Pennsylvania arrived, freeing up part of the 52nd Pennsylvania to advance. As it did, that detachment sustained a significant number of casualties; the 23rd Pennsylvania and remainder of the 52nd Pennsylvania were then forced to retreat. As the 52nd Pennsylvanians regrouped at sheltering structures along the Nine Mile road, they were then able to render "most effective service." Crossing to the left of Couch's Union troops, they advanced again, and made their way through a forest near Seven Pines, "where they remained actively employed until dark." At that point, CSA troops advanced "rapidly in masses to the rear of Nine Mile road," forcing Union troops to retreat, but the 52nd Pennsylvania, "having their line of retreat cut off," were forced to find another route of retreat. Escaping "by passing through the woods to the left and rear of the saw-mill at the White Oak Swamp" and then on to another Union line, they were finally able to reconnect with the 1st Brigade. McClellan later commended the brigade for gallantry. According to Bates, "Of the two hundred and forty-nine officers and men who went into the conflict, one hundred and twenty-five ... were killed or wounded. Of the latter were Captains Davis, who lost an arm, Lennard, Chamberlain, Weidensaul, and Carskaden." As records were updated, the names of four more 52nd Pennsylvania Volunteers were added to the list, bringing the regiment's total number of casualties to 129.

On June 2, details were sent to recover the wounded and bury the dead. Among the dead was a member of F Company, whose body was found near a house at Seven Pines by his brother, a fellow 52nd Pennsylvanian, according to Mott, who added that wounded men who had been located by Captain Pickering and his detail were loaded onto an ambulance and returned to the regiment's encampment. When he reached the former camp of the 104th Pennsylvania near a house at Fair Oaks, Mott found more members of the 52nd who had been killed in action. In total of the 125 casualties, 26 had been killed in action, or died shortly after being mortally wounded. Among the wounded later identified by name by Mott in his history of the regiment were: Captain James Chamberlain and Lieutenants Samuel Cuskaden and J. P. S. Weidensaul of D Company, and Captains G. R. Lennard and Greenleaf P. Davis of Companies A and E.

The surviving members of the 52nd Pennsylvania were then assigned to fatigue duty, during which they strengthened built new rifle pits and redoubts in and around the Chickahominy while also strengthening existing defenses.

Ordered by McClellan to hold Bottom's Bridge and its neighboring railroad at all costs, or to destroy the two bridges there if his troops could not do so, Naglee once again turned to the sharpshooters of the 52nd Pennsylvania. Directing them, on June 26, to line the railroad along the Chickahominy River for a mile "above and below" the bridges, he then moved the remainder of the 52nd Pennsylvania under Lieutenant Colonel Hoyt into "redoubts, rifle pits, and on picket duty," along with men from the 56th and 100th New York infantry. The situation remained relatively quiet until June 28 when a CSA force composed of two infantry regiments and an artillery battery with cavalry support "crossed the railroad, and under cover of the wood, took position on the high ground facing the Chickahominy, and about one thousand yards from the bridges." In response, Naglee directed the artillery batteries of Brady, Miller and Morgan" to test their respective ranges against the enemy and, when he spotted movement, directed the Union batteries to open fire, forcing those CSA troops to retreat. By 7 p.m., Naglee's troops had successfully destroyed the railroad bridge, enabling his army to withdraw and bivouac on high ground near the White Oak Swamp Bridge."

In response to orders from McClellan to Naglee to move his troops into position to support Brigadier-General W. F. Smith's army, Naglee's men were next "in line of battle perpendicular to" those troops by 11 a.m. on June 30 with the "right resting on the main road leading from the White Oak Bridge [and] the left on the swamp, about three-fourths of a mile from the bridge – a portion of the Fifty-second being deployed in the swamp, extending from the brigade to the bridge." As a result, they were able to successfully repulse all enemy attempts to cross the river. Ordered to move with Smith's men at 10 p.m. that night, Naglee's men (including the 52nd Pennsylvania) then marched 17 miles to reach "Haxall's, on the James River," arriving at 6 a.m., July 1. Withdrawing further to Harrison's Landing on July 2, they were then transferred to the command of General William H. Emory, under whom they provided support for General John Pope's army at Yorktown and received heavy artillery training, beginning August 20. The 52nd Pennsylvania was then ordered south for duty in the Carolinas.

Packing up their equipment at Yorktown, the 52nd Pennsylvanians boarded the USS Georgia on December 29. Departing aboard that steamer, they then slowed to pick up officers from the 52nd who were traveling aboard the mailboat Thomas Morgan and a tug. Realizing that their steamer was not suitable for an ocean trip, the regiment's commanding officer then directed the boat to stop at Fort Monroe, where he telegraphed Baltimore to secure a more seaworthy vessel. Boarding the USS Expounder (formerly known as the Daniel Webster), the regiment then departed for the Carolinas on New Year's Eve, and reached Beaufort Harbor, North Carolina on January 2, 1863.

=== 1863 ===
Attached to the U.S. Army's Department of the South, the 52nd Pennsylvania was next ordered to Port Royal, South Carolina, and sailed for that city on January 29, 1863. Landing at St. Helena Island on February 10, they made camp, and remained there until April 4, when they were ordered to board the bark, Milton, and head south for the Edisto River, but after two collisions with two different vessels and then receiving word that Union troops at Beaufort, South Carolina needed support, they turned around, and arrived there in mid-April. That journey turned out to be part of an unsuccessful Union attack on Charleston.

Remaining at Beaufort, South Carolina from mid-April to July 5, the 52nd Pennsylvania Volunteers were next ordered to Folly Island. In preparation for the Union Army's bombardment of Morris Island, the 52nd Pennsylvanians were then sent up the Stono River with members of the 104th Pennsylvania to create a diversion. Naval support from the Nantucket enabled them to land on James Island, but shortly thereafter, they were ambushed by enemy troops while on a causeway. Halting their march until daylight, they were able to drive the CSA pickets and their cavalry support back to Secessionville. The diversionary tactic successful, the main Union force was able to secure control of the land on Morris Island up to Fort Wagner. Additional Union infantrymen and an artillery battery were then sent to reinforce the 52nd and 104th Pennsylvania on James Island. In response to shelling of the Union gunboat Pawnee and James Island, the soldiers on James Island, with support from a newly arrived Connecticut battery, were able effect a retreat by the offending CSA forces but, upon determination by Union leaders that their troops on James Island were in an untenable position, those Union troops were ordered to withdraw. They did while covered by the 52nd Pennsylvania, which then also safely withdrew. Upon reaching Folly Island, the 52nd Pennsylvanians were on hand to witness the ill-fated, but intensely courageous, July 16, 1863 assault by the 54th Massachusetts on Fort Wagner, later recounted in the 1989 Academy Award-winning film, Glory. They then participated with other Union troops in the subsequent siege on the fort from mid-July through early September, at which point CSA troops abandoned the fort.

On November 5, 1863, Captain John C. Dodge, Jr. resigned his commission. In December 1863, a significant number of men from the regiment then re-enlisted, were each awarded bounty of $400 and a 30-day veteran's furlough, and permitted to return home to Pennsylvania to visit family and friends. Taken by troop transport to Hilton Head, they then sailed for New York aboard the USS Arago; upon arrival, they boarded the train for Scranton, Pennsylvania. During this time, leaders of the regiment recruited new men to replace the fallen members of their ranks, and arranged to re-arm their troops with Springfield rifles in preparation for their continued service in South Carolina.

=== 1864 ===
As a New Year dawned, Lieutenant Colonel Henry M. Hoyt and Major John B. Conyngham of the 52nd Pennsylvania were advanced in rank, respectively, to colonel and lieutenant colonel on January 9, 1864. Captain Thomas B. Jayne, commanding officer of the 52nd's B Company, was also promoted. Transferred to the regiment's field and staff officer corps, he was commissioned as a major. Then, upon returning from their furloughs to Morris Island, South Carolina in early February 1864, the 52nd Pennsylvania Infantry was attached to the U.S. Army's X Corps (10th Corps) under the command of General Quincy A. Gilmore. Although initially ordered to join the Union forces gathered at Bermuda Hundred, Virginia, the powers that be in the U.S. Department of the South decided to keep them at Hilton Head, South Carolina. From this post, the 52nd Pennsylvanians were subsequently ordered to make periodic raids on South Carolina's Sea Islands, including one raid each at John's, Kiowa and Bull's.

On April 22, the 52nd Pennsylvania was then ordered to Hilton Head, where it remained until being ordered back to Folly Island on June 13.

On July 3, 1864, 125 men from the 52nd Pennsylvania, led by Colonel Henry M. Hoyt, attacked Fort Johnson on James Island, but the ill-fated assault suffered from poor execution by other participating Union troops of a strategic plan which had been badly designed by senior Union leaders. Finding themselves without their promised support and cut off from retreat, after having scaled a parapet and made it inside the fort, Hoyt and his detachment of 52nd Pennsylvanians were ultimately captured by CSA troops. The officers who became POWs were held at Macon before being transferred to Charleston, where they were at risk from friendly fire by Union troops stationed on Morris Island. The enlisted men who became POWs were sent to CSA prisons at Columbia and Florence, South Carolina and/or Andersonville, Georgia; more than 50 died before they could be freed. In addition, the regiment also sustained 23 casualties during the assault, including seven who were killed or mortally wounded in action (see "Casualties" below).

Stationed on Morris Island during the summer and fall of 1864, the 52nd Pennsylvanians were assigned to heavy artillery duties during which they were directed to shell Charleston with rifled Parrott guns.

=== 1865—1866 ===
Assigned to the "boat infantry" during the winter of late 1864 and early 1865, according to Bates, this duty for the 52nd Pennsylvania Volunteers "was exceedingly difficult arduous," and was, essentially, the equivalent of "picket duty upon the harbor."

All through the long, blustering, wintry nights the men sat with muskets, howitzers, and Requa batteries, peering across the iron-clad harbor; collisions with the enemy's pickets were frequent.

On February 5, 1865, the 52nd Pennsylvania's John A. Hennessy was advanced in rank in order to fill the leadership vacuum created when Major John Conyngham was imprisoned as a POW. The newly commissioned Major Hennessy then led an expedition to Fort Sumter on February 18, but found it deserted. After hoisting the regimental flag over the ruins (the first U.S. flag over the fort in nearly four years), the party continued into Charleston, entering the city before the Confederates had finished evacuating it.

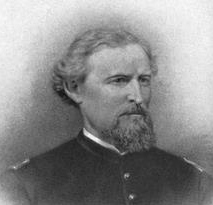
Col. John B. Conyngham

After the capture of the city, the 52nd Pennsylvania joined the army of General William Tecumseh Sherman, and engaged with that army in various operations across the South. As a result, the members of this regiment were present at the surrender of General Joseph E. Johnston at the Bennett Place near Raleigh, North Carolina.

Meanwhile, John B. Conyngham returned to his regiment. Having survived imprisonment as a POW, he was commissioned as a full colonel and made commanding officer of the 52nd Pennsylvania on June 3, 1865.

Finally, after serving for nearly the entire duration of the American Civil War, the 52nd Pennsylvania Veteran Volunteers were permitted to return home to Pennsylvania where, on July 12, 1865, they honorably mustered out.

In 1866, Col. Henry M. Hoyt was recognized "for gallant and meritorious services, to date from March 12, 1865" via nomination by President Andrew Johnson and approval by the U.S. Senate for the rank of brigadier-general by brevet.

== Commanders ==
Lieut. Colonel H.M. Hoyt

== Casualties ==
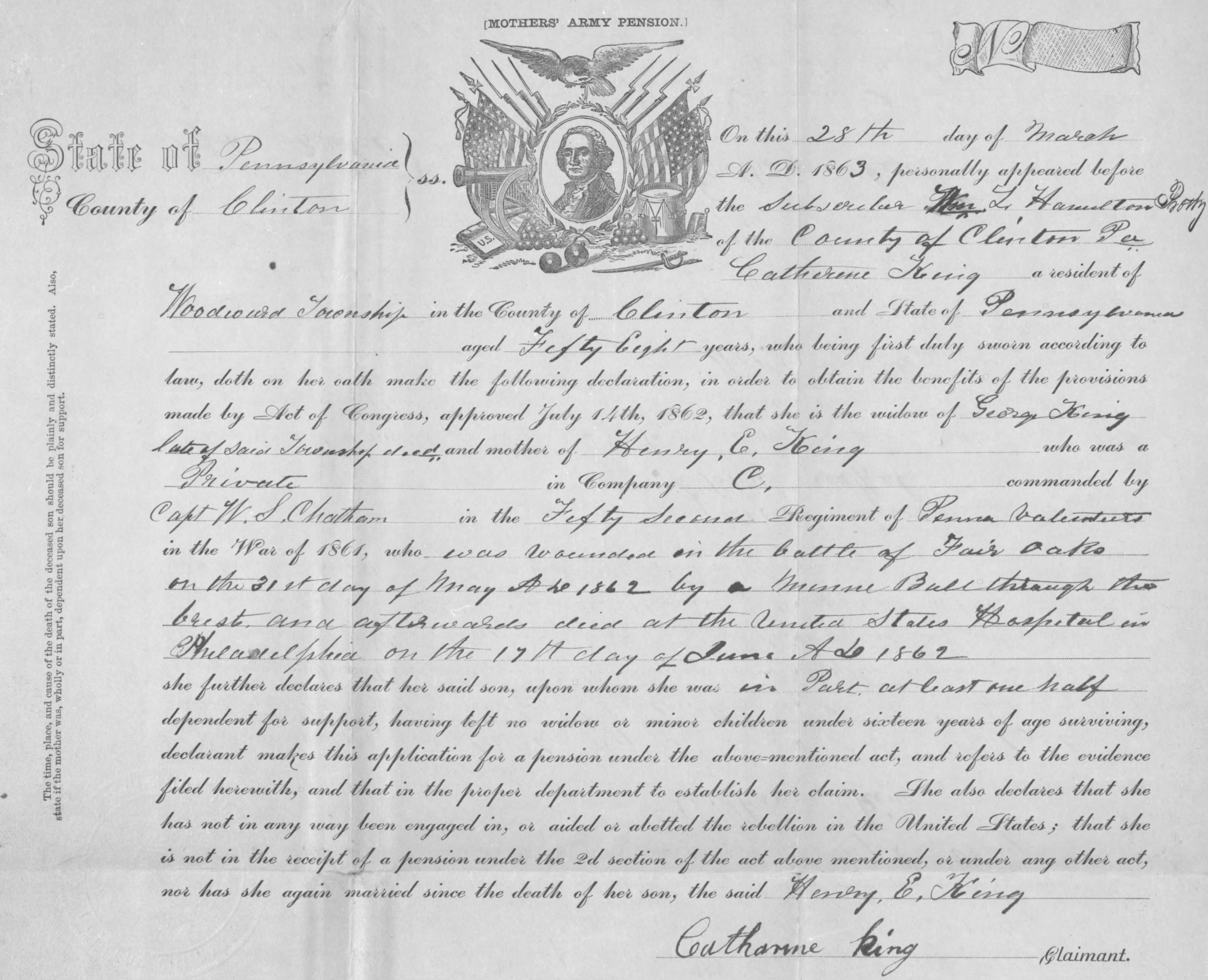
The fatal chest wound sustained by Pvt. Henry King in the Battle of Fair Oaks was documented in his mother's Civil War pension file (U.S. National Archives/Fold3).

The 52nd Pennsylvania incurred a number of casualties during its tenure of service, including men who were killed in action, mortally or severely wounded in battle and died later from those wounds, men injured so severely or made so ill by ailments contracted while in service that they were discharged on surgeons' certificates of disability, like Frank Charles Bunnell, and others who were wounded but were able to return to duty following medical treatment, as well as those who were declared missing in action, and/or who were captured and held as prisoners of war (POWs). At least one, Private William Moyer of C Company, was killed by friendly fire, while I Company's 1st Sergeant Benjamin Franklin Jones contracted tetanus after accidentally shooting himself in the hand while cleaning his rifle at the regiment's camp on Morris Island, South Carolina. Another member of the regiment, Porter Summers of B Company, was believed to have been killed by scalding water during a boiler explosion while serving on detached duty aboard the gunboat USS Mound City during the Battle of Saint Charles, Arkansas.

Siege of Yorktown, Lee's Mill, Virginia, early May 1862

- Pruyne, Jr., John (private, Co. F): Certified by his commanding officer, Capt. Cook, as having been "killed by the explosion of a torpedo in front of the enemy's works, May 4, 1862" at Lee's Mill, Virginia

Battle of Seven Pines (also known as the Battle of Fair Oaks), Virginia, May 30 to June 1, 1862

- Dunkelberger, Israel (private, Co. D): Sustained "Vulnus Sclopeticum" (gunshot wound); died from that wound at the Union hospital at Annapolis, Maryland on June 4, 1862
- English, James C. (private, Co. A): Native of Tipperary County, Ireland; died at a Union hospital in Washington, D.C. from combat-related wounds
- Jenkins, Robert (private, Co. A): Discharged on a Surgeon's Certificate of Disability due to battle wounds; died at home from battle wound-related complications
- Jones, Benjamin Franklin (1st sergeant, Co. I): Killed in action
- King, Henry (private, Co. C): Died at a Union hospital in Philadelphia from chest wound sustained in battle (see image above right for further details)
- Lott, George D. (sergeant, Co. B): Discharged on a Surgeon's Certificate of Disability due to battle wounds; died at home from battle wound-related complications
- McGonnel, Edward (private, Co. D): Killed in action
- Moyer, Benjamin (private, Co. D): Killed in action
- Shoemaker, Henry (private, Co. C): Died from amputation required for treatment of combat-related gunshot wound to leg
- Slenker/Slinker, Henry (corporal, Co. C): Reported by his commanding officer as having been "killed at his post" by gunshot
- Spacht, Michael (private, Co. D): Per the U.S. War Department's Pension and Record Office, "Wounded hand and face (also shown as wounded arm) ... May 31.1862: Treated June 4 to 24.62 ... died June 24, 1862, cause Vulnus Sclopet" (gunshot wound) at a Union hospital, Washington, D.C.

Attack on Fort Johnson, South Carolina, July 3, 1864

- Bunyon, Silas A. (lieutenant and acting adjutant, Co. E): Mortally wounded during the attack; died later the same day (July 3, 1864) at Morris Island, South Carolina
- Scott, Jr., George (1st sergeant, Co. D): According to an affidavit filed by Col. Henry Holt, Scott was "mortally wounded in the attack on Fort Johnson, James Island, S.C. ... and died on the evening of the 4th of July 1864." Holt also noted that, at the time of his death, Scott "was commissioned as 2nd Lieut in my company but not mustered."

Prisoners of War (POWs)

Among the regimental casualty figures for the 52nd Pennsylvania were men who were captured by Confederate troops and held as prisoners of war, including Private Ezra Ripple (1842–1909) of K Company. A native of Carbon County, Pennsylvania who was a druggist at the time of his enlistment with the 13th Pennsylvania Militia, he was captured on July 3, 1864, while serving with the 52nd Pennsylvania. Held initially at Fort Johnson in South Carolina, he was transported to the Confederate States Military Prison at Andersonville, Georgia on the Fourth of July. Held there for two months, he was then transferred to the CSA Military Prison at Florence, South Carolina (also known as the Florence Stockade). Held there until his release on March 1, 1865, he was then discharged honorably from his regiment by General Order on June 30, 1865, and sent home to Pennsylvania. After raising a family, he died in Scranton, Lackawanna County, on November 19, 1909, and was buried at the Dunmore Cemetery.

Per the U.S. National Park Service, as a POW at the Florence Stockade, Private Ripple "lived in a shebang, the most common form of shelters used by prisoners" and "described the living conditions in his memoirs":

There was nothing left to do but dig a hole in the ground. As it would have to be roofed over with our gum blankets, we could only dig it as long and as wide as they would permit, and in that hole the four of us had to harbor for the winter. We dug it about three feet deep, but could not make it long enough to allow us straighten out our legs, or wide enough to permit us to lie in any other way than spoon fashion. Our shoulders and hip bones made holes in the ground into which they accurately fitted, and so closely were we packed together that when one turned we all had to turn. Lying all night in our cramped position with no covering, keeping life in each other by our joint contribution of animal heat only, we would come out of the hole in the morning unable to straighten up until the sun would come out to thaw us and limber our poor sore, stiff joints.

Other members of the 52nd Pennsylvania who died while being held as POWs included:

- Callahan, Michael (private, Co. D): Captured by Confederates during the attack on Fort Johnson; died from disease while imprisoned as a POW at Andersonville, Georgia
- Cary, Archibald (private., Co. D): Died while imprisoned as a POW at the Florence Stockade, South Carolina
- Davis, David D. (private, Co. I): Captured by Confederates during the attack on Fort Johnson; died in October or November 1864 from scurvy or chronic diarrhea while imprisoned as a POW at the Florence Stockade, South Carolina
- Duffy, James (private, Co. F): Captured by Confederates; died September 18, 1864, from typhoid fever while imprisoned as a POW at Andersonville, Georgia
- Goodwin, William (private, Co. K): Initially declared missing in action on July 3, 1864, following the attack on Fort Johnson, it was reported by a fellow soldier that Goodwin had been captured by Confederates, and that he died in January 1865 from "ill treatment" while imprisoned as a POW at the Florence Stockade, South Carolina
- Klanson/Klauser, Sr., Peter (private, Co. F): Captured by Confederates; died October 4, 1864, while imprisoned as a POW at the Florence Stockade, South Carolina
- Long, Charles (private, Co. D): Captured by Confederates during the attack on Fort Johnson; declared missing in action while imprisoned as a POW at Andersonville, Georgia; according to an affidavit filed by his wife (based on information provided to her by an ex-Andersonville POW), Long was weakened by starvation and sickened by scurvy, and died at Andersonville
- Miller, Amzi (private, Co. D): Captured by Confederates during the attack at Fort Johnson; died from disease while imprisoned as a POW at Andersonville, Georgia August 13, 1864
- Nagle, Samuel (private, Co. D): Captured by Confederates during the attack at Fort Johnson; imprisoned first at James Island, South Carolina, then at Andersonville, Georgia, and then at the Florence Stockade, South Carolina; taken with a group to Goldsborough, North Carolina, he was left behind when he was physically too weak to proceed; pension records state: "Died at Goldsborough. N.C. Mar. 26. 1865"
- Palmer, Jacob (private, Co. F): Captured by Confederates; died November 12, 1864, from chronic diarrhea while imprisoned as a POW at the Florence Stockade, South Carolina
- Pell, Benjamin (private, Co. D): Captured by Confederates during the attack at Fort Johnson; died while imprisoned as a POW at the Florence Stockade, South Carolina or at Andersonville, Georgia
- Pool, Gilbert (private, Co. D): Captured by Confederates during the attack at Fort Johnson; imprisoned first at James Island, South Carolina, then at Andersonville, Georgia, where he died August 22, 1864
- Rahmer, Charles (private, Co. D): Per an affidavit filed on January 20, 1866, in the Civil War Widows' Pension case of Christina Rahmer, widow of Charles Rahmer, by Corp. A. J. Sober, (Co. D), Rahmer was one of the D Company men "taken prisoners of war on the third day of July 1864, and were taken to Florence South Carolina, and that on the 7th day of February AD 1865 the said Charles Rahmer died of Chronic Diarrhea at Florence South Carolina as a Prisoner of War"
- Warner, Gideon (private, Co. D): Captured by Confederates; died during the evening of October 15, 1864 from chronic diarrhea while being held as a POW at the Florence Stockade, South Carolina

=== Post-War health experiences of 52nd Pennsylvania Volunteers ===
Although not counted among the casualty numbers during the Civil War, many of the men who survived the conflict suffered from lifelong health problems attributable to their military service. Among the former members of the 52nd Pennsylvania who reported health problems post-war was J. J. Miller, who described his symptoms for the Wilkes-Barre Times in 1896:

I have suffered for over 30 years from my kidneys. Exposure during the war added to my complaint until it became a confirmed disease; as for remedies re-commended and prescribed by physicians I have used too many to mention, doctors have had my back thoroughly blistered and tortured me in many ways without any relief at all. I used to go up as often as twelve times in a night to pass urine, and it was a high red color containing heavy sediment, the urine burned in passage. I could not bend or stoop and it hurt me to turn over in bed. I had a stinging pain in the back and most severe headaches.

== Reunions and other commemorative activities ==
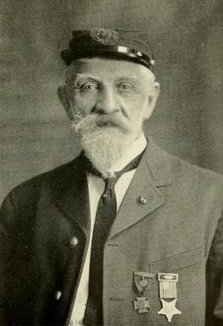
Smith B. Mott, regimental historian, 52nd Pennsylvania Infantry, c. 1911.

During the 52nd Pennsylvania's second annual reunion, which was held in Scranton, Lackawanna County on September 25, 1889, survivors of the regiment were treated to a reading of Sumter regained: dedicated to the Fifty-Second Regiment.

The regiment's third annual reunion was held at Tunkhannock in Wyoming County on September 25, 1890. In 1904, the 17th annual gathering was held again in Scranton, but this time on September 21.

Appointed as regimental historian by his former Civil War comrades at their 23rd annual reunion on September 13, 1910, Smith B. Mott, the former regimental quartermaster of the 52nd Pennsylvania Volunteers, was also authorized that same day to compile the organization's history. Entitled, The Campaigns of the Fifty-Second Regiment Pennsylvania Volunteer Infantry First Known as 'The Luzerne Regiment' Being the Record of Nearly Four Years' Continuous Service, from October 7, 1861, to July 12, 1865, in the War for the Suppression of the Rebellion, it was published by J.B. Lippincott & Co. in 1911.

== See also ==
- List of Pennsylvania Civil War Units
