= Henry M. Hoyt (Solicitor General) =

American lawyer (1856–1910)

Henry Martyn Hoyt
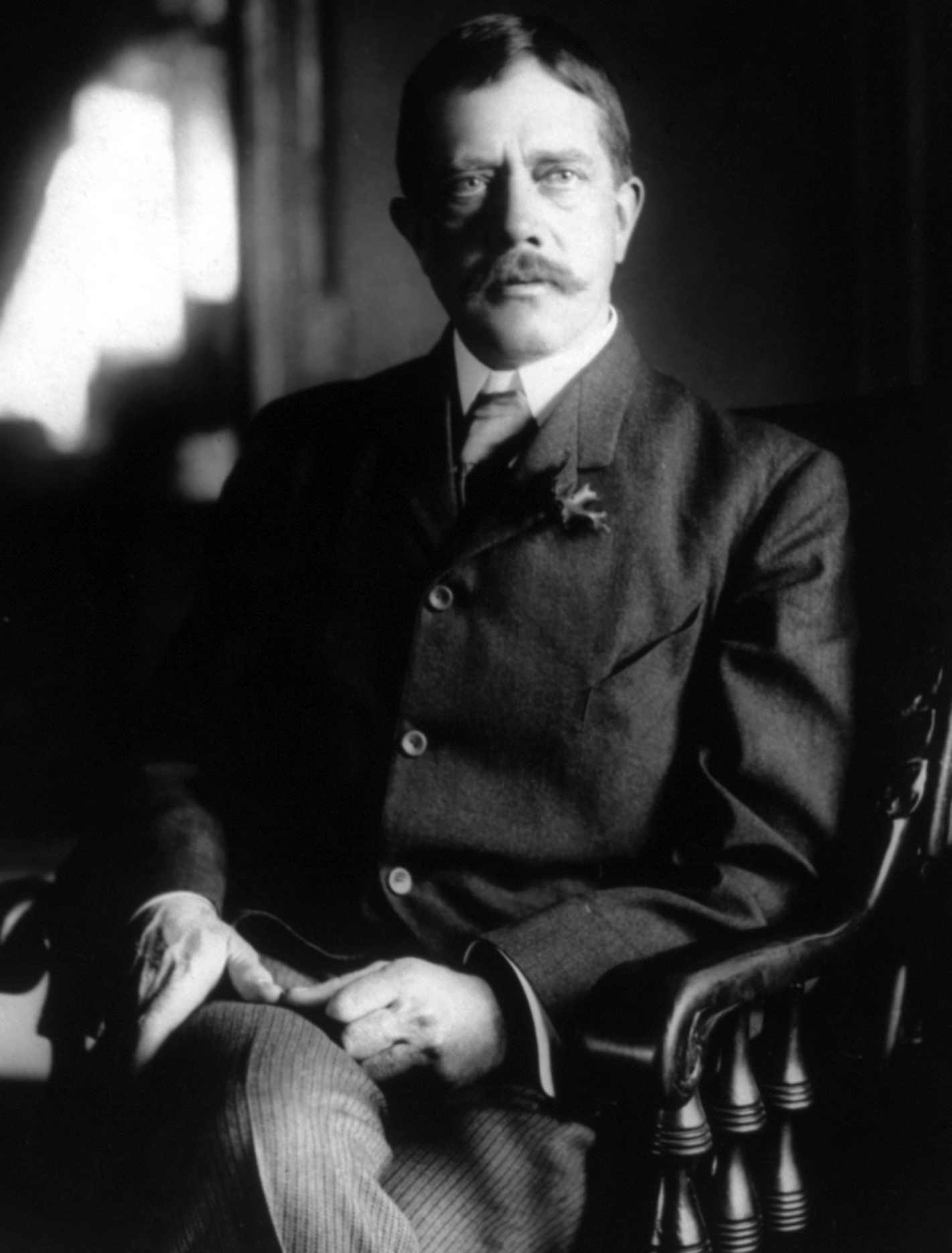
- Hoyt in 1904

11th Solicitor General of the United States
- In office February 25, 1903 – March 31, 1909
- President: Theodore Roosevelt
- Preceded by: John K. Richards
- Succeeded by: Lloyd Bowers

Personal details
- Born: December 5, 1856 Wilkes-Barre, Pennsylvania, U.S.
- Died: November 20, 1910 (aged 53) Washington, D.C., U.S.
- Party: Republican
- Spouse: Anne McMichael (m. 1883; died 1910)
- Children: 5
- Parent(s): Henry M. Hoyt; Mary Elizabeth Loveland
- Education: University of Pennsylvania Law School; Yale University

Henry Martyn Hoyt Jr. (December 5, 1856 – November 20, 1910) served as Solicitor General of the United States from 1903 to 1909. His father, also named Henry Martyn Hoyt, served as governor of Pennsylvania from 1879 to 1883.

== Early life ==
Hoyt was born on December 5, 1856, in Wilkes-Barre, the son of Mary Elizabeth (née Loveland) Hoyt (1833–1890) and Henry Martyn Hoyt, the governor of Pennsylvania from 1879 to 1883. He graduated from Yale University in 1878 and the law school of the University of Pennsylvania in 1881. At Yale, he was a classmate of William Howard Taft, who would later become president.

== Career ==
After a career spent in private practice as a lawyer in Pennsylvania, starting in Pittsburgh and then in banking he became an Assistant Attorney General in 1897. In 1903, he was appointed Solicitor General by Theodore Roosevelt. After the end of Roosevelt's term in office he became a counselor to Secretary of State Philander C. Knox.

== Personal life ==
In 1883, Hoyt married Anne Morton McMichael (1862–1949), a daughter of Col. Morton McMichael Jr., "one of the foremost citizens of Philadelphia" and a granddaughter of Mayor Morton McMichael. Together, they had five children, including:

- Elinor Morton Hoyt (1885–1928), a poet who married three times.
- Henry Martyn Hoyt III (1887–1920), an artist who married Alice Gordon Parker (1885–1951).
- Constance A. Hoyt (1889–1923), who married Baron Ferdinand Carl von Stumm, son of Baron Ferdinand Eduard von Stumm, in 1910.
- Morton McMichael Hoyt (1899–1949), who three times married, and divorced, Eugenia Bankhead, known as "Sister" and sister of Tallulah Bankhead.
- Nancy McMichael Hoyt (1902-1955), a romance novelist who wrote Elinor Wylie: The Portrait of an Unknown Woman in 1935; she married Edward Davison Curtis; they divorced in 1932.

== Death ==
Hoyt died on November 20, 1910, in Washington, D.C.

Legal offices
Preceded by John K. Richards	Solicitor General; 1903–1909	Succeeded by Lloyd Wheaton Bowers
