= Henry M. Hoyt =

American politician (1830–1892)

Henry Martyn Hoyt, Sr.
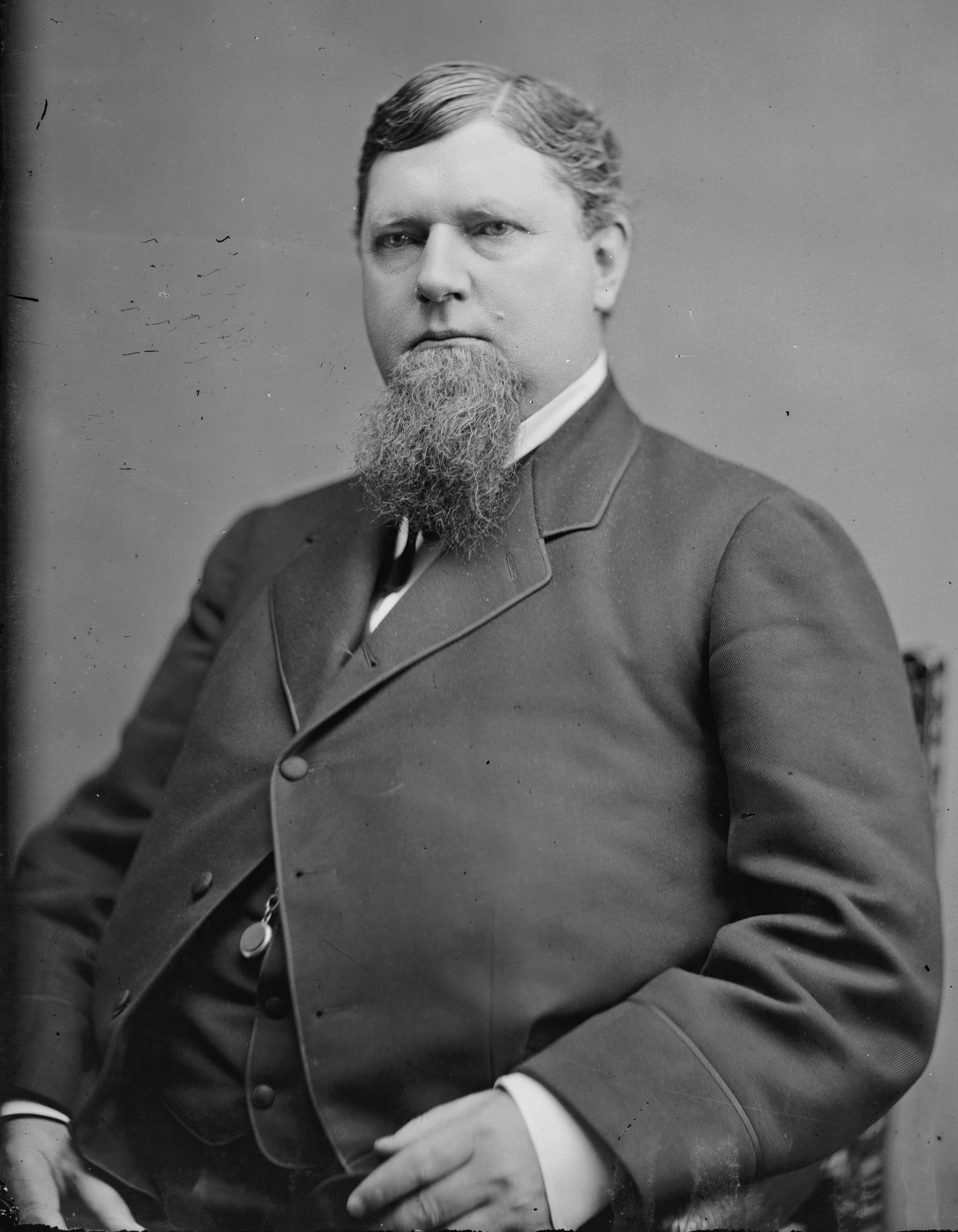
- Hoyt, 1865–1880

18th Governor of Pennsylvania
- In office January 21, 1879 – January 16, 1883
- Lieutenant: Charles W. Stone
- Preceded by: John F. Hartranft
- Succeeded by: Robert E. Pattison

Personal details
- Born: June 8, 1830 Kingston, Pennsylvania, US
- Died: December 1, 1892 (aged 62) Wilkes-Barre, Pennsylvania, US
- Party: Republican
- Spouse: Mary Elizabeth Loveland (m.1855)
- Children: 3 Henry Martyn Hoyt, Jr.

Military service
- Allegiance: United States; Union
- Branch/service: Union Army
- Years of service: 1861–1865
- Rank: Colonel; Bvt. Brigadier General
- Commands: 52nd Pennsylvania Infantry
- Battles/wars: American Civil War: Peninsula Campaign; Second Battle of Charleston Harbor

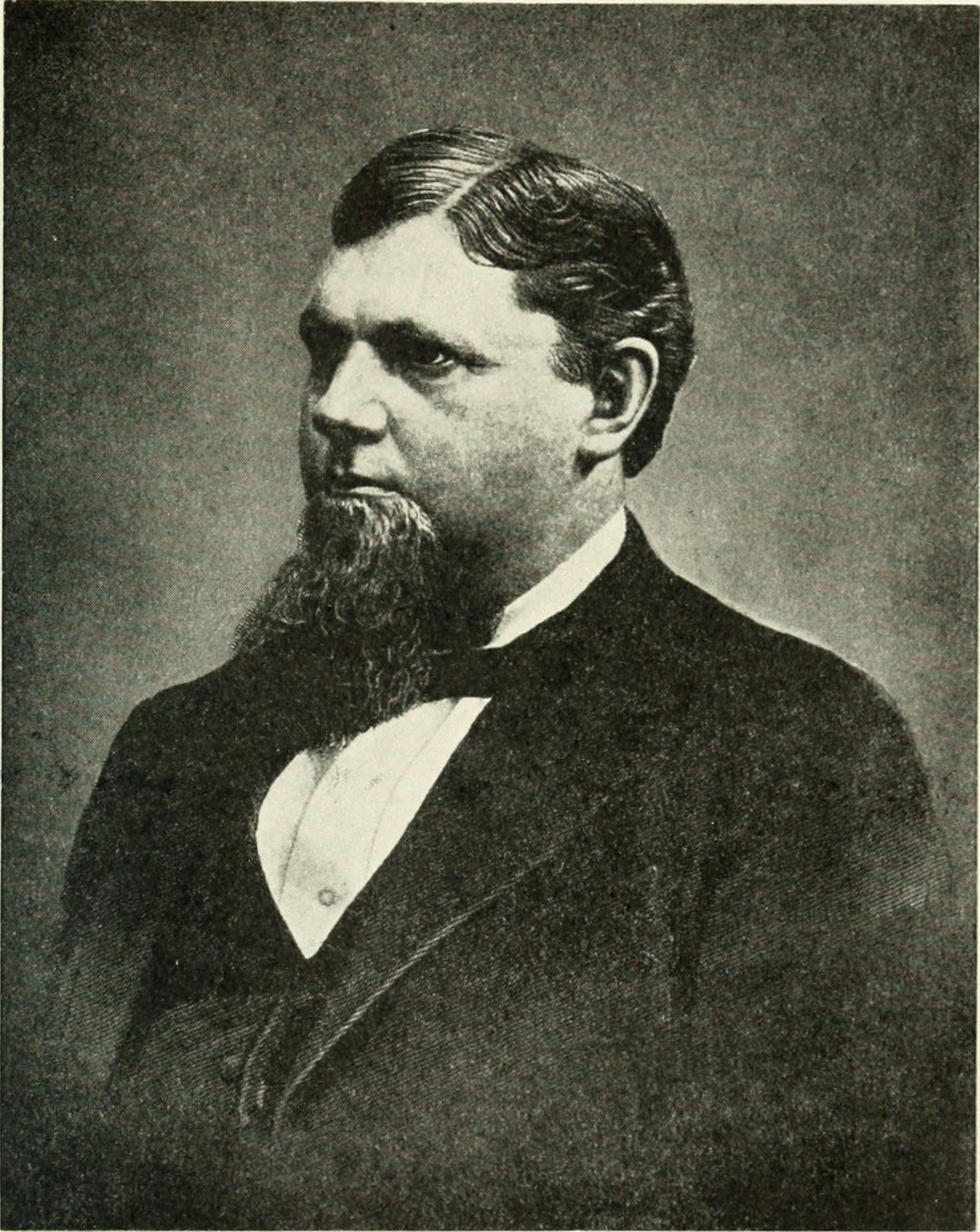
Hoyt, c. 1903

Henry Martyn Hoyt, Sr. (June 8, 1830 – December 1, 1892) was an American lawyer and politician and the 18th governor of Pennsylvania from 1879 to 1883, as well as an officer in the Union army during the American Civil War.

== Early life ==
Henry M. Hoyt was born in Kingston, Pennsylvania. He attended lower education at Wyoming Seminary. He started higher-level classes at Lafayette College, where he studied from 1845 until 1848. He transferred to Williams College, graduating in 1849 with Phi Beta Kappa honors, as a member of Kappa Alpha Society.

== Career ==
After graduating from Williams College, he returned to Pennsylvania, where he taught Mathematics at Wyoming Seminary from 1851 to 1853. Hoyt first held elected office as a district attorney. A member of the Whig Party, Hoyt participated in John Fremont's 1856 presidential campaign.

=== Military career ===
As a soldier in the Civil War, Hoyt was initially commissioned as Lieutenant Colonel, then as colonel of the 52nd Pennsylvania Infantry. He led it during the Peninsula Campaign and subsequent actions of the Army of the Potomac until January 1863, when the regiment was ordered to Charleston, South Carolina.

He participated in the siege of Morris Island under Brig. Gen. Quincy A. Gillmore. Hoyt led troops in a rare night attack on Fort Johnson, stealthily arriving in the darkness via boats. He initially captured the fort, but was unable to hold it for lack of reinforcements. He and many of his men were captured in a Confederate counterattack. After being confined in a prisoner-of-war camp in Macon, Georgia, Hoyt was taken back to Charleston. He escaped briefly before being recaptured.

Upon his eventual exchange, he rejoined his regiment. He served with them until the close of the war, when he was mustered out with the rank of brevet brigadier general.

=== Law career ===
After the war, Hoyt returned to his law practice. After briefly serving as a judge, he rose in influence with the Republican party and chaired the state Republican party from 1875 to 1876.

In 1878, he won the governor's seat, the third consecutive Civil War general to hold the office. During his term, the state's debt was reduced to $10,000,000 and refunded at a rate of three percent.

Hoyt wrote two books: Controversy between Connecticut and Pennsylvania (Philadelphia, 1879), about their competing colonial claims settled after the Revolutionary War; and Protection vs. Free Trade (New York, 1885).

== Personal life ==
On September 25, 1855, Hoyt married Mary Elizabeth Loveland (b. April 1833 – d. October 1890 in Luzerne County), the daughter of Elijah and Mary (née Buckingham) Loveland. They had three children together. Henry Martyn Hoyt, Jr. (1856–1910) became solicitor general.

Hoyt died in Wilkes-Barre on December 1, 1892. He is buried next to his wife in the Forty Fort Cemetery in Luzerne County, Pennsylvania.

== Honors ==
- In 1881, Hoyt was awarded the honorary degree of LL. D. from the University of Pennsylvania and also from Lafayette College.
- A residence hall in the South Halls section of the Pennsylvania State University at the University Park campus is named for him.

== See also ==
- American Civil War prison camps

== Notes ==
Party political offices
Preceded by John F. Hartranft	Republican nominee for Governor of Pennsylvania; 1878	Succeeded by James A. Beaver
Political offices
Preceded by John F. Hartranft	Governor of Pennsylvania; 1879–1883	Succeeded by Robert E. Pattison
