= Alexander Oppler =

German sculptor

- Born: 10 February 1869; Hanover, Kingdom of Prussia
- Died: 18 March 1937 (aged 68); Berlin, Germany
- Occupation: Sculptor

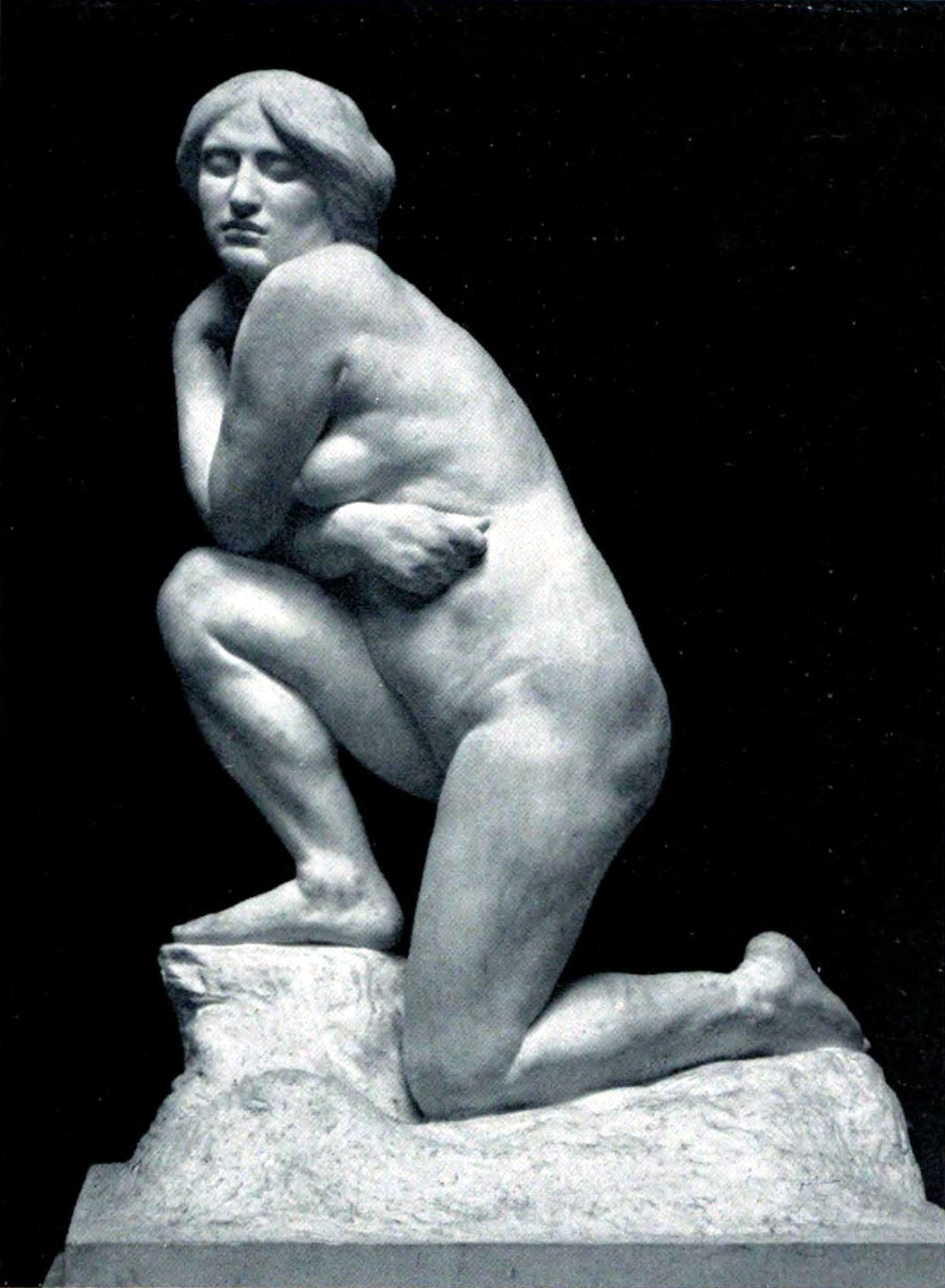
Eve

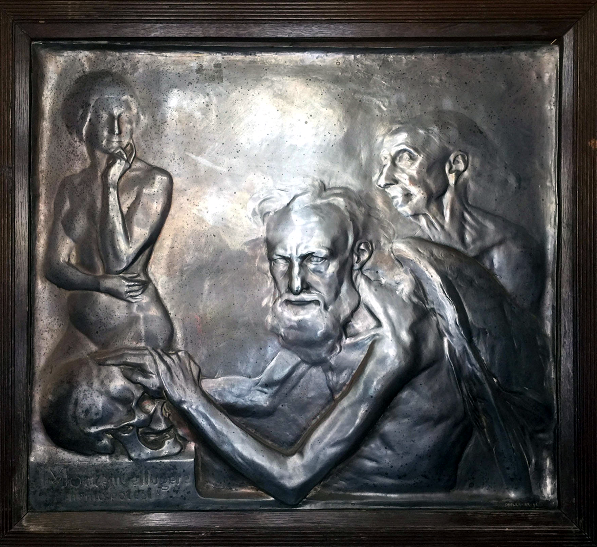
"Morte effugere nemo potest" (No one can escape death, bronze relief)

Alexander Oppler (10 February 1869 – 18 March 1937) was a German sculptor of Jewish ancestry; best known for his portrait busts. He also worked as a medallist.

== Life and work ==
His father was the architect, Edwin Oppler. His older brother, Ernst, was a painter and etcher. He had two younger brothers who were also well known; Berthold, a doctor, and Siegmund, a jurist.

From 1888 he studied art; first at the Academy of Fine Arts, Munich, then at the Académie Royale des Beaux-Arts in Brussels and the Académie des Beaux-Arts in Paris. He was a member of the Munich and Berlin Secessions.

He was an early member of the Deutscher Künstlerbund (Artists' Association), and took part in their first exhibition, in 1904, at what is now the Staatliche Antikensammlungen (antiquities collection) in Munich; represented by two marble statues and a plaster bust.

Among his best known works is a bust of the artist, André Derain. He considered his most important work to be the fountain at Olivaer Platz in Berlin, which the Nazis destroyed. A sculpture he created for his family grave at the Parkfriedhof Lichterfelde has also been lost. Many of his works were saved by his daughter Ellen, when she emigrated to the United States. They were later donated to the Brevard Art Center (now the Foosaner Art Museum) in Melbourne, Florida.

His works may also be seen at the Wallraf-Richartz-Museum in Cologne, the Museum Kunst Palast in Düsseldorf, the Museum August Kestner in Hanover, and the Landesmuseum Württemberg in Stuttgart.
