= Ernst Oppler =

German painter and etcher

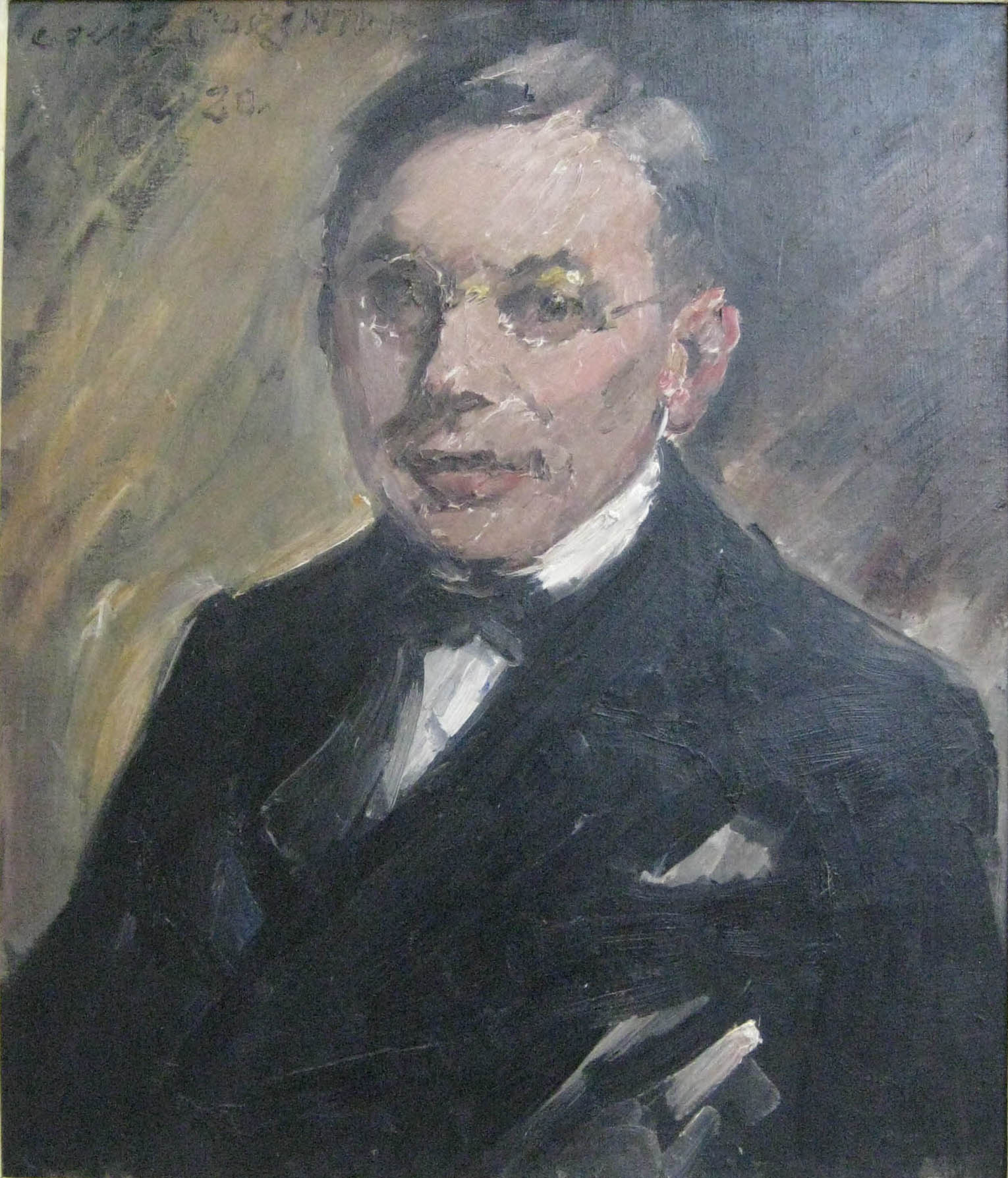
Ernst Oppler; portrait by Lovis Corinth

Ernst Oppler (19 September 1867 – 1 March 1929) was a German Impressionist painter and etcher born in Hanover.

== Early life ==
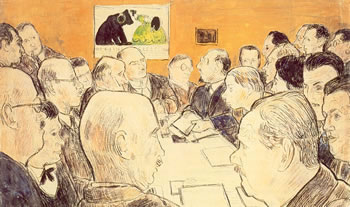
Oppler at a meeting of the Berlin secession (between Lovis Corinth and Emil Orlík, drawing by Erich Büttner, 1921

Ernst Oppler was the son of Edwin Oppler, a prominent German-Jewish architect. Ernst Oppler's brothers were the sculptor Alexander Oppler, the physician Berthold Oppler, and the attorney and notary Siegmund Oppler. His cousin was the designer Else Oppler-Legband.

He studied at the Academy of Arts in Munich under Nikolaus Gysis and Ludwig von Löfftz. Afterwards he moved to London to study the work of James Abbott McNeill Whistler, one of his favorite artists. He became a member of the International Society of Sculptors, Painters and Gravers in 1898. His early work was naturalistic in approach. In 1901 he went to the Netherlands to practise the pleinair method, and painted elegant portraits of the gentry in subdued tones.

== Berlin Secession ==
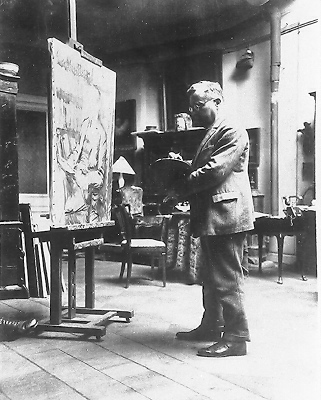
Ernst Oppler in his studio, 1926

Back in Munich, Oppler joined the Munich Secession. In 1904 Max Liebermann invited Oppler and Lovis Corinth to leave Munich and move to Berlin, where both became members of the Berlin Secession, a group of artists who championed the new German Impressionist style. Oppler became there a renowned portraitist, and also chronicled daily life through his drawings, etchings, painted cityscapes and genre scenes. He and his brother, the sculptor Alexander Oppler, had studios in their own Villa Oppler in Berlin-Grunewald and a city apartment in the Kurfürstenstraße. Ernst Oppler was invited seven times to the Venice Biennale and participated six times.

In 1912 after controversies about expressionism he stopped participating in the exhibitions of the Berlin secession but he still remained one of the most prominent members of the avant garde. The German state bought works from Oppler and exhibited them in museums as examples of the new wave in art. Oppler started to visit performances of the Russian ballet which was very popular at that time and began to document the performances. He became also an important chronicler of the history of ballet in Germany.

Oppler died in Berlin on 1 March 1929.

== Works ==
In Germany, works by Oppler are on display at the National Gallery Berlin, the Neue Pinakothek in Munich, the Lower Saxony State Museum and others. Outside of Germany, his works are found in the Appleton Museum of Art, the Harvard Art Museums, the San Francisco Museum of Modern Art, the Brooklyn Museum, the Tel Aviv Museum of Art, the Israel-Museum, the Ateneum in Helsinki, the Museum of Modern Art in Venice and others.

== Gallery ==
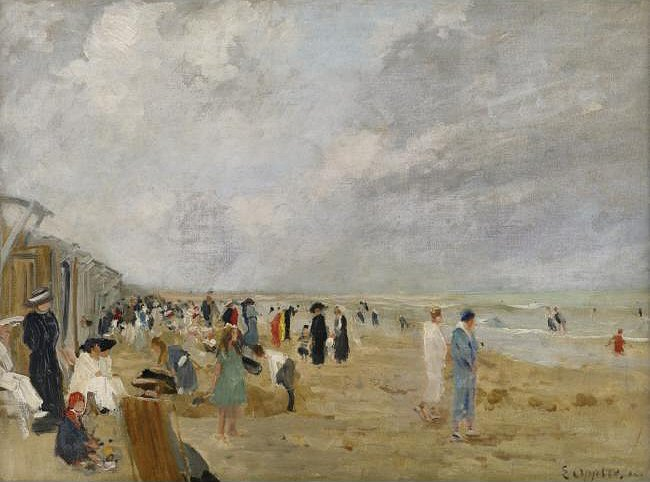
At the Beach, oil on canvas, 1910–12

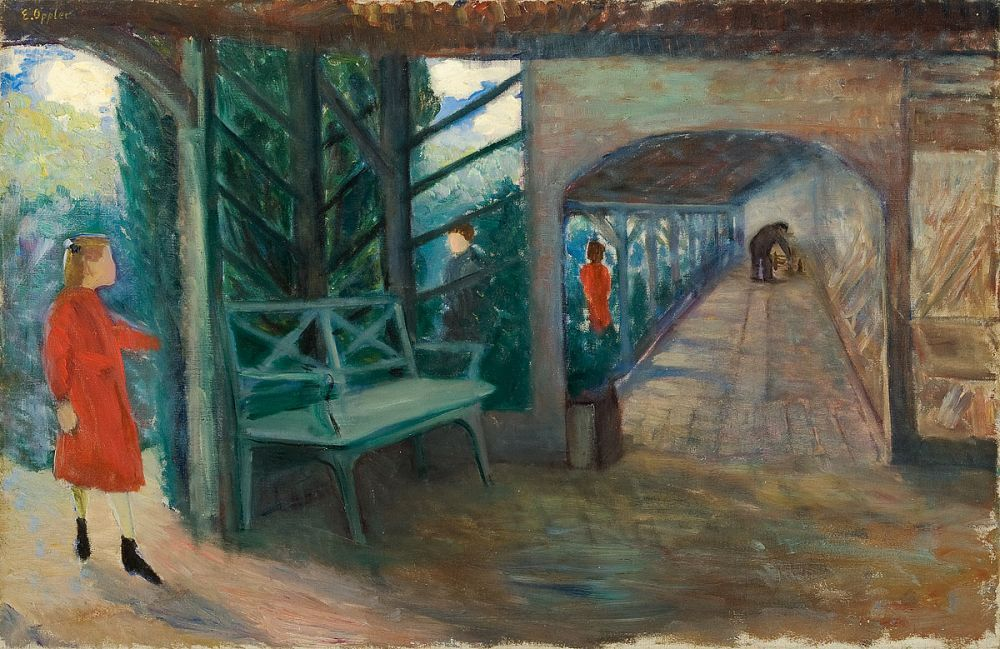
Three Girls in the Access Balcony, oil on canvas

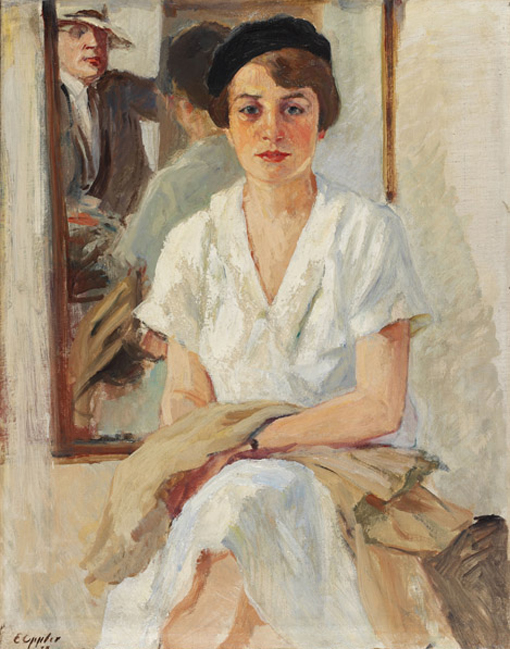
The Painter and Jo, oil on canvas, 1928

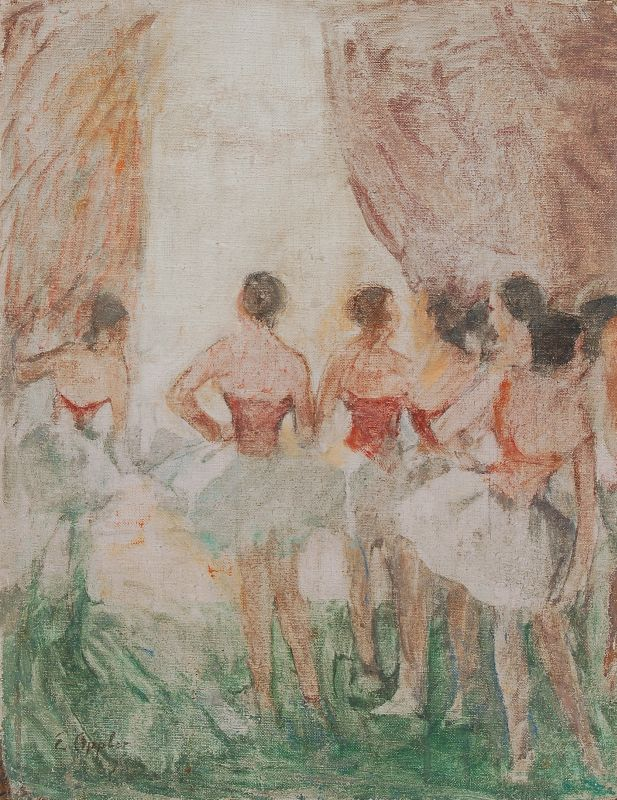
Ballet, oil on canvas

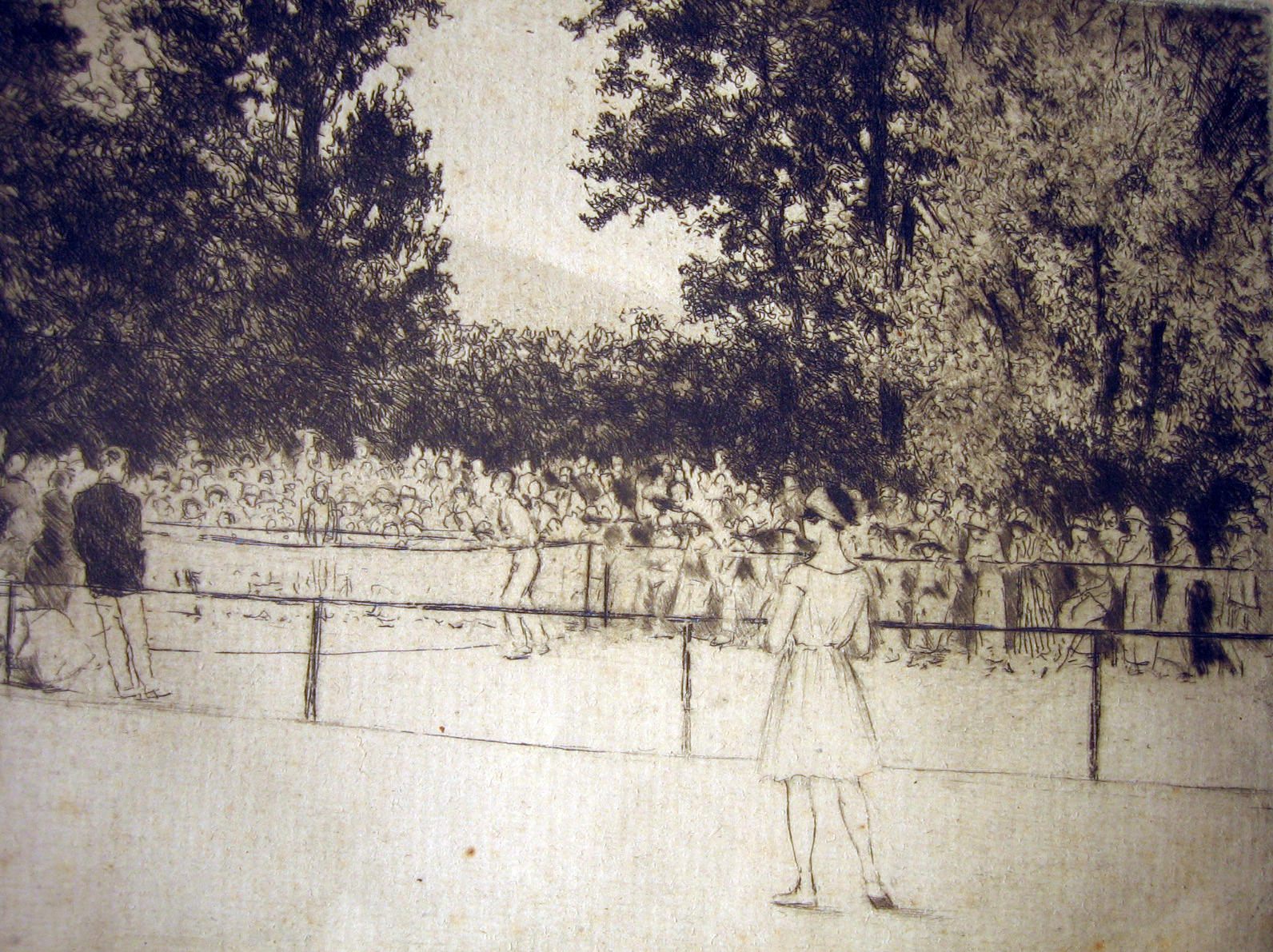
Tennis, etching, ca. 1920
