= New Synagogue (Breslau) =

Former Reform synagogue in Breslau, Germany

- German: Neue Synagoge; Polish: Nowa Synagoga
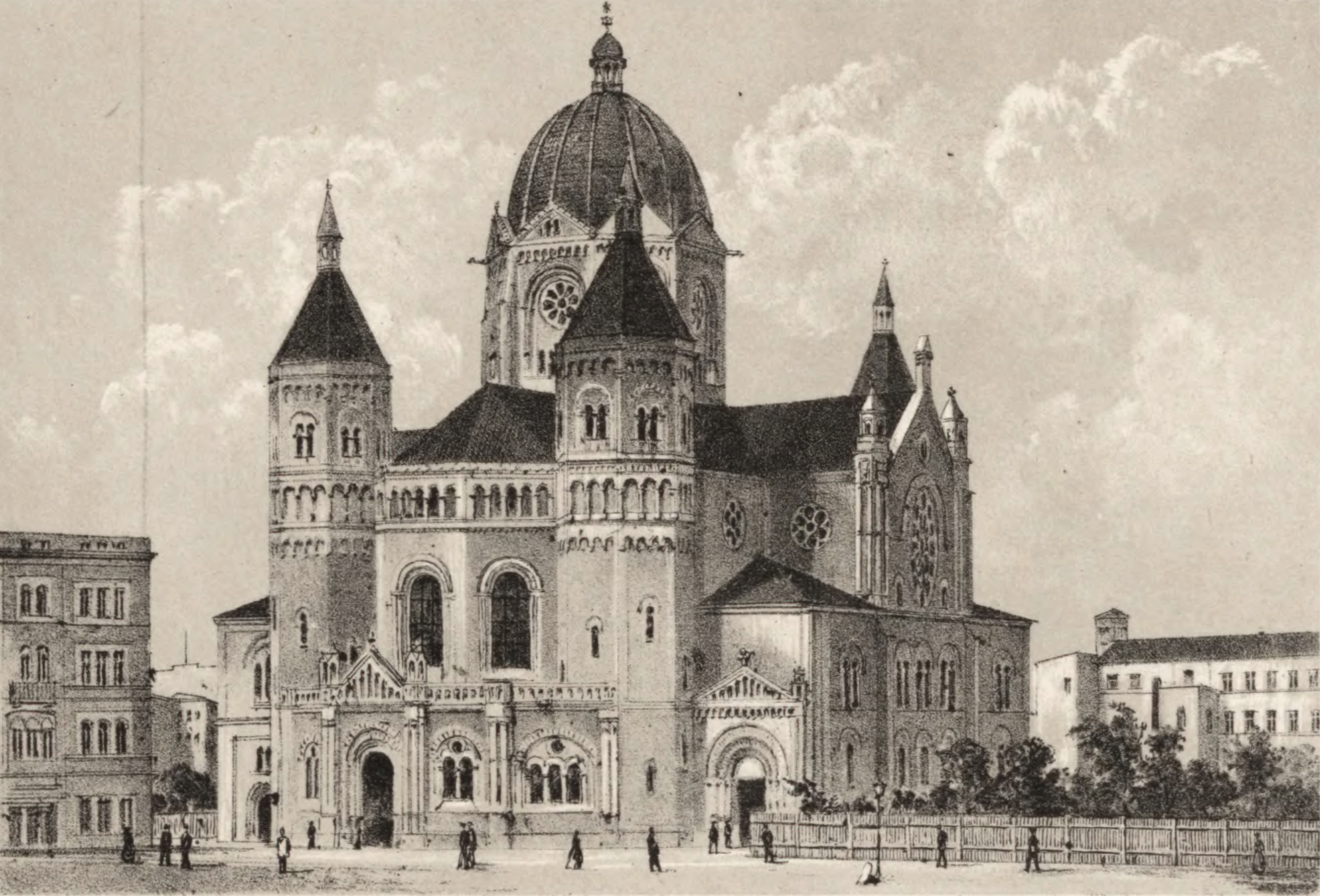
- The former synagoge in the 19th century

- Location of the former synagogue in Germany, as it was in 1937

Religion
- Affiliation: Reform Judaism (former)
- Ecclesiastical or organizational status: Synagogue (1872–1938)
- Status: Destroyed

Location
- Location: Breslau (now Wrocław)
- Country: Germany (now Poland)
- Interactive map of New Synagogue
- Coordinates: 51°06′16″N 17°01′42″E

Architecture
- Architect: Edwin Oppler
- Type: Synagogue architecture
- Style: Romanesque Revival
- Completed: 1872
- Destroyed: November 1938 (during Kristallnacht

Specifications
- Dome: One
- Dome height (outer): 73 m (240 ft)
- Minaret: Four

The New Synagogue (German: Neue Synagoge; Polish: Nowa Synagoga) was a former Reform Jewish congregation and synagogue, located in Breslau, Germany (now Wrocław, Poland). It was one of the largest synagogues in the German Empire and a centre of Reform Judaism in Breslau. Designed by Edwin Oppler in the Romanesque Revival style and completed in 1872, the synagogue was destroyed during the Kristallnacht pogrom which swept across Nazi Germany on 9–10 November 1938.

== History ==
At the time of the synagogue's construction, Breslau had a Jewish population of 20,000, with only Berlin and Hamburg larger in size.

Manuel Joël, who had become the rabbi for the Reform Jewish community in 1863, was the first rabbi to head the community in the new building. He died in 1890, and was followed by Jacob Guttman, who served until his death in 1919. Dr. Hermann Vogelstein became the rabbi in 1920. On November 4, 1938, there was a farewell service for him, and a welcome service for Dr. Reinhold Lewin, who would be the last rabbi.

== See also ==
- History of the Jews in Germany
- History of the Jews in Poland
- List of synagogues in Germany (in German)
- List of synagogues in Poland
