= Halberg Castle =

German castle

Coordinates: 49.2229°N 7.0308°E

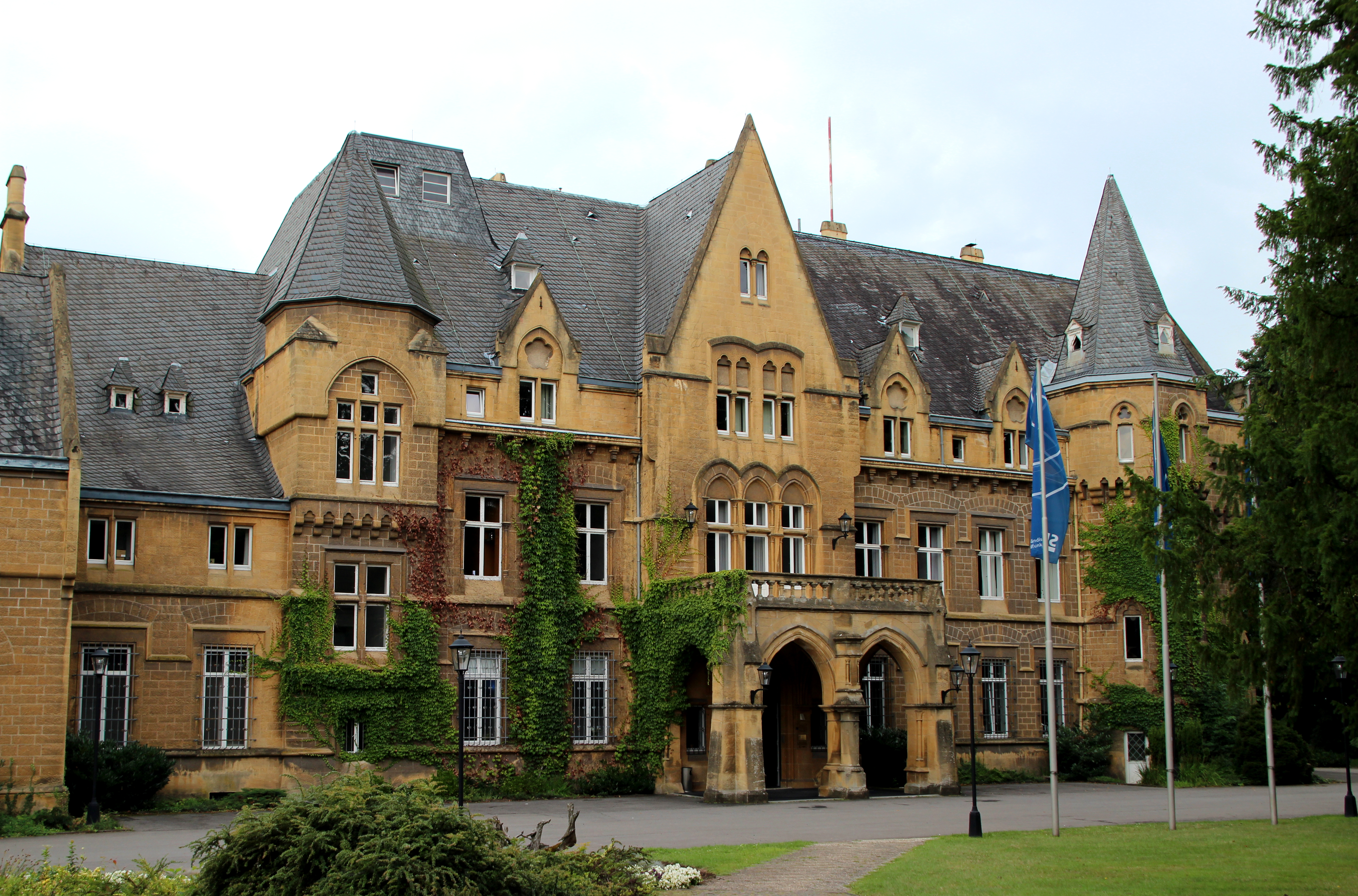
Main building of Halberg Castle, 2014

Halberg Castle (German: Schloss Halberg) is a German castle built between 1877 and 1880 on Halberg mountain near Saarbrücken. The castle is located in the area of the former municipality of Brebach, which was merged with Fechingen to form Brebach-Fechingen in 1959 and incorporated into Saarbrücken in 1974. The castle complex, which was designed by the architects Edwin Oppler and Ferdinand Schorbach for Carl Ferdinand von Stumm-Halberg, is the second largest neo-Gothic secular building in Saarland after the St. Johann Town Hall despite renovations and partial demolition after World War II.

== History ==
=== Monplaisir ===
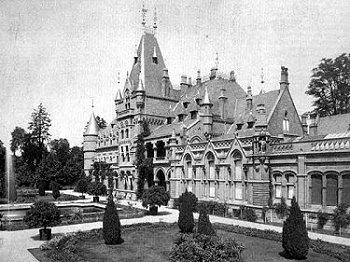
Halberg Castle before destruction, c. 1900

At the beginning of the 18th century, Louis Crato, Count of Nassau-Saarbrücken had a small baroque lustschloss (pleasure palace) called "Monplaisir" built between 1709 and 1711 at Halberg, from designs by Joseph C. Motte dit la Bonté, architect of the Saarlouis fortress. In 1710, the baroque gardens received a castle wall, and in 1711 the interior was completed. The building consisted of a small five-axis building with a mansard roof and two single-story cavaliers' houses in front. Prince William Henry of Nassau-Saarbrücken had the gardens further expanded with the creation of a zoo. During the reign of Prince Louis, his gardener expanded the baroque garden in c. 1772 to include an English landscape park with an orangery and Chinese houses in the Chinoiserie style. In c. 1788, architect Balthasar Wilhelm Stengel (son of Friedrich Joachim Stengel) added a pheasantry and finch house.

From 1774, Monplaisir was the preferred residence of Princess Wilhelmine of Schwarzburg-Rudolstadt (1751–1780), whose multiple extramarital relationships (including Baroness Amalie Frederike von Dorsberg and, her maidservant, Katharina Kest) had made life at court unbearable. In November 1793 the castle buildings, as well as the family's Schloss Jägersberg, were destroyed by French Revolutionary troops.

=== Halberg Castle ===
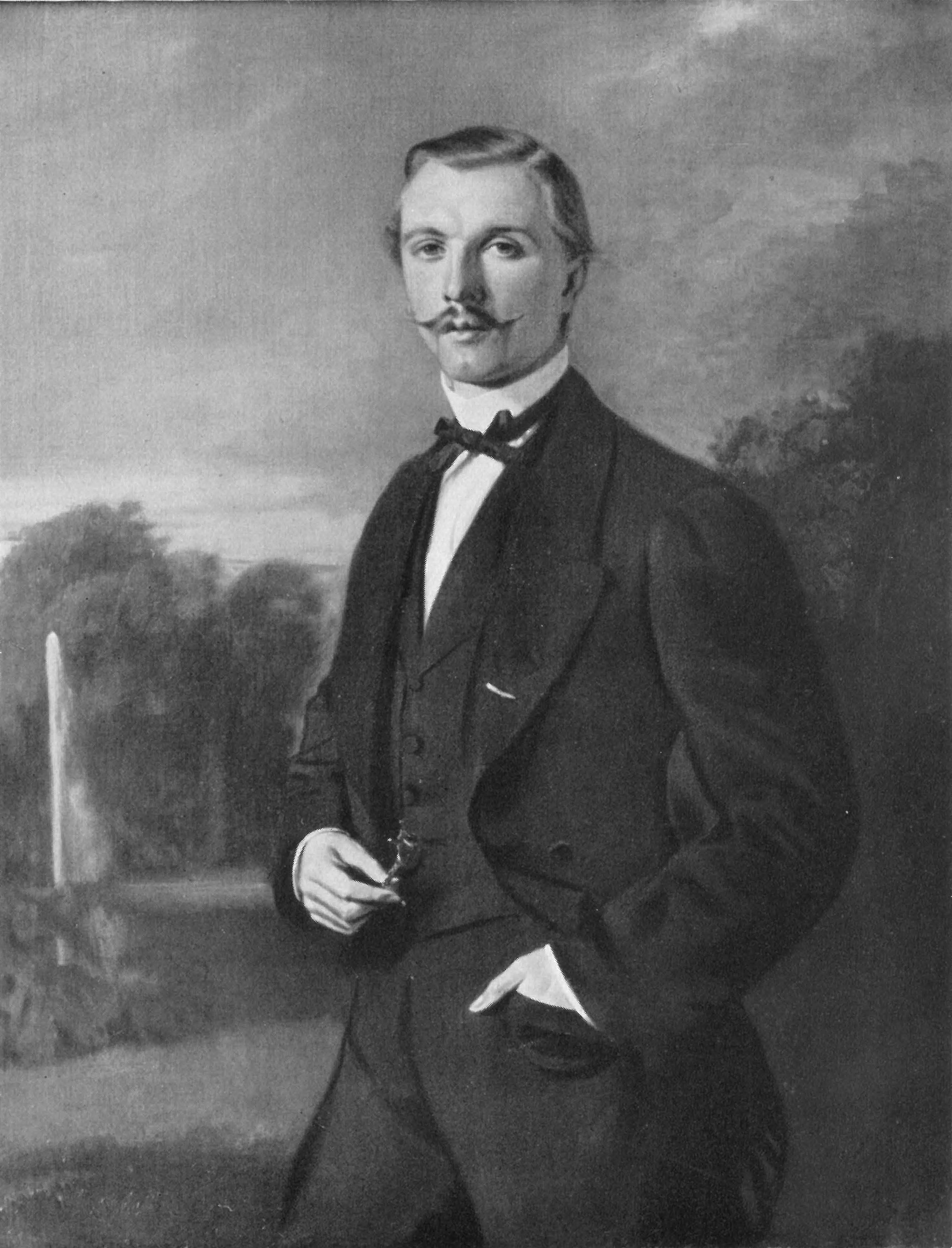
Portrait of Carl Ferdinand von Stumm-Halberg, c. 1860

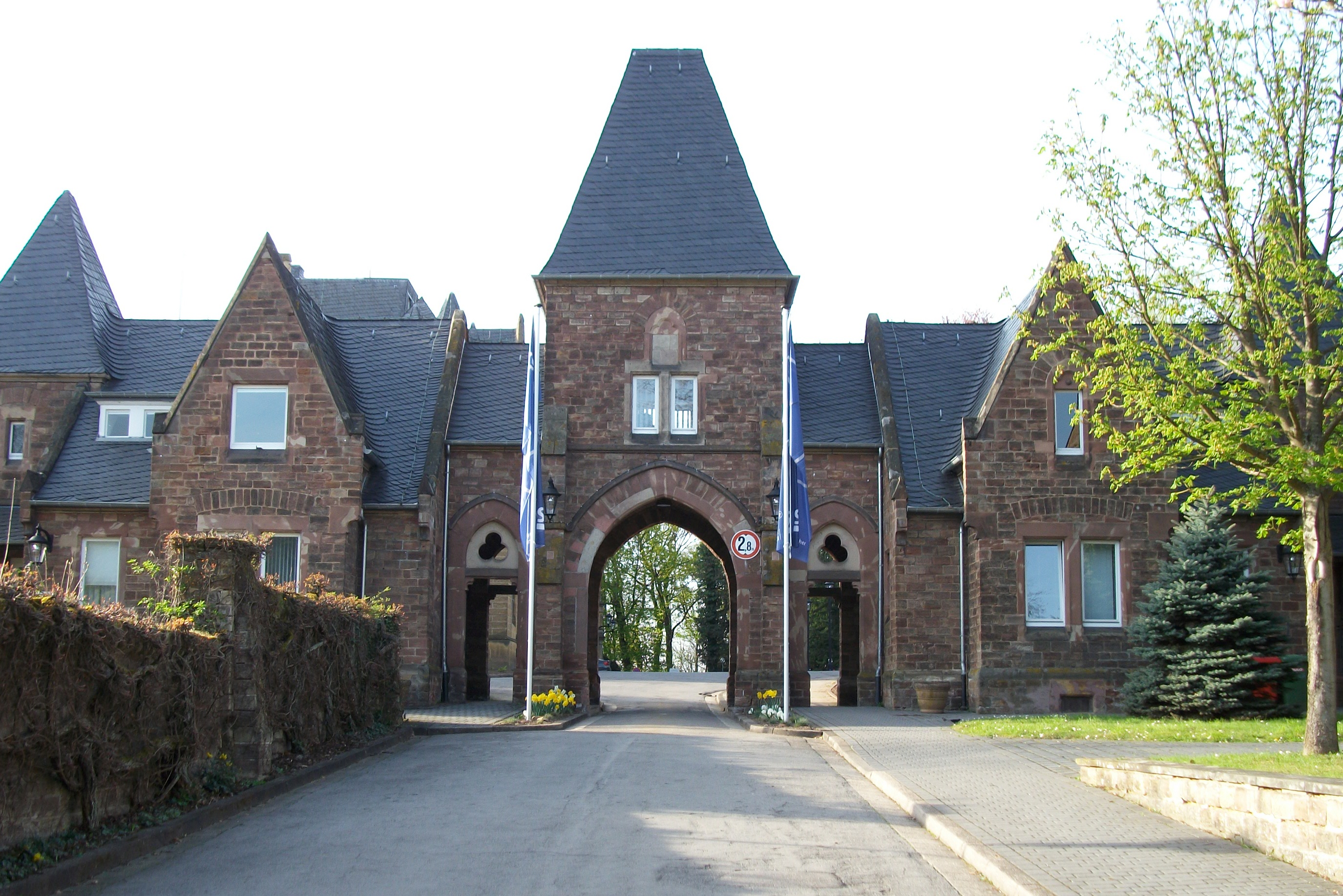
Façade of the gate building

In the 19th century, Halberg developed into a popular destination for the citizens of Saarbrücken and St. Johann. It became known in 1875 that the Royal Prussian Forestry Administration in Trier wanted to sell Halberg to the industrialist Carl Ferdinand Stumm of Neunkirchen, which angered the citizens of Saarbrücken and St. Johann. Halberg had been open to citizens during the time of the Saarbrücken princes, and even after the castle was destroyed, the residents of the surrounding area used the area for excursions and festivals. The citizens set up a A municipal beautification association with the goal of converting Halberg into a public park. The campaign was unsuccessful, however, and, in 1877, Stumm purchased all of Halberg for 700,000 marks and hired architect Edwin Oppler from Hanover was commissioned to design and build a new castle.

Stumm had become incredibly wealthy as a partner in Stumm Brothers, and between 1877 and 1880, was in competition with his brothers Ferdinand Eduard von Stumm and Hugo Rudolf von Stumm, who also had magnificent castles built (Rauischholzhausen Castle and Ramholz Castle), a neo-Gothic castle was designed by Oppler. The landscape park surrounding the castle was designed by the Royal Prussian gardener Eduard Neide and carried out by the architect Heinrich Siesmayer, who also designed the parks for Stumm's brother at Rauischholzhausen. The façade was built from yellow Jaumont limestone from Maizières-lès-Metz.

Stumm, and his brothers, were ennobled in 1888, with his title linked to Halberg, as Baron von Stumm-Halberg. The Prussian King and German Emperor Wilhelm II stayed at Halberg Castle in 1892 as a guest of Baron von Stumm-Halberg.

=== Later ownership ===
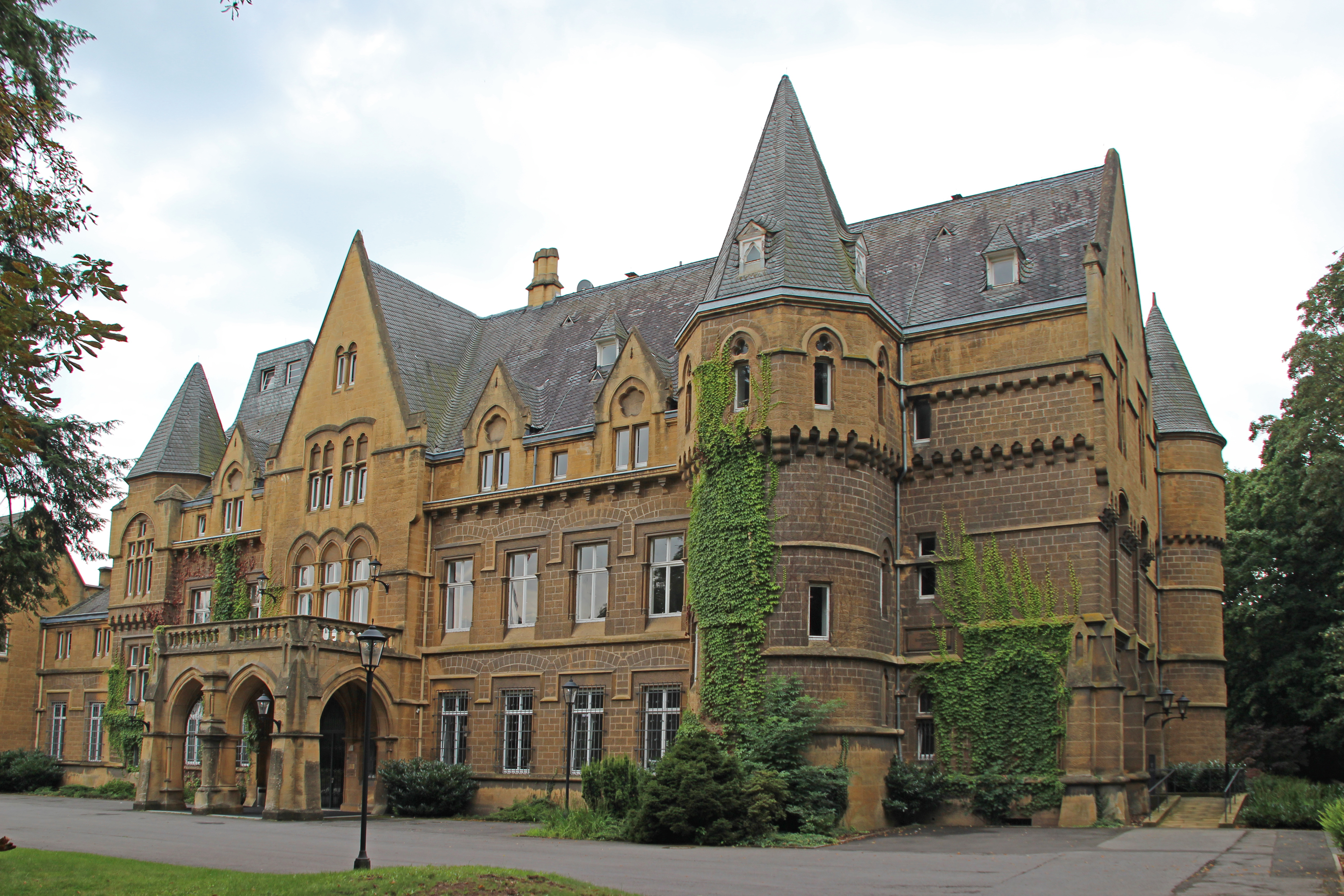
Other view of main building, 2014

Upon the death of Baron von Stumm-Halberg in 1901, the castle became the property of his heirs, widow Ida Charlotte Böcking (1839–1918) and their four daughters: Ida Henriette Charlotte (wife of politician Conrad von Schubert), Elisabeth Maria, Helene Karoline (wife of chamberlain Waldemar Anno Otto Kurt von Heimburg) and Bertha Hedwig (wife of diplomat Hellmuth Lucius von Stoedten).

In 1939, the property passed from the Stumm heirs to the Saarbrücken district and from the Saarbrücken district to the Großdeutscher Rundfunk for 538,000 Reichsmarks. During World War II, the castle served as a military post for the Saarbrücken anti-aircraft cannon regiment. After the War, the French military governor and High Commissioner Gilbert Grandval resided in the castle from 1948 to 1952. The garden façade of the castle was largely stripped of its neo-Gothic decorations by Grandval and his wife Yvonne, who were strongly opposed the neo-Gothic style. In 1952, the French customs administration replaced Grandval as landlord. During this time, the building underwent extensive changes and was further damaged by a fire in 1958.

In 1959, the Saarland Broadcasting Corporation acquired the complex. By 1969, several outbuildings of the old castle were demolished to make space for a number of new pavilion-style buildings (designed by architects Heinz Eber and Ernst Jung). A French/German restaurant is located within the castle.

== Gallery ==
Architectural drawings by Edwin Oppler, courtesy of the Hanover State Archives.

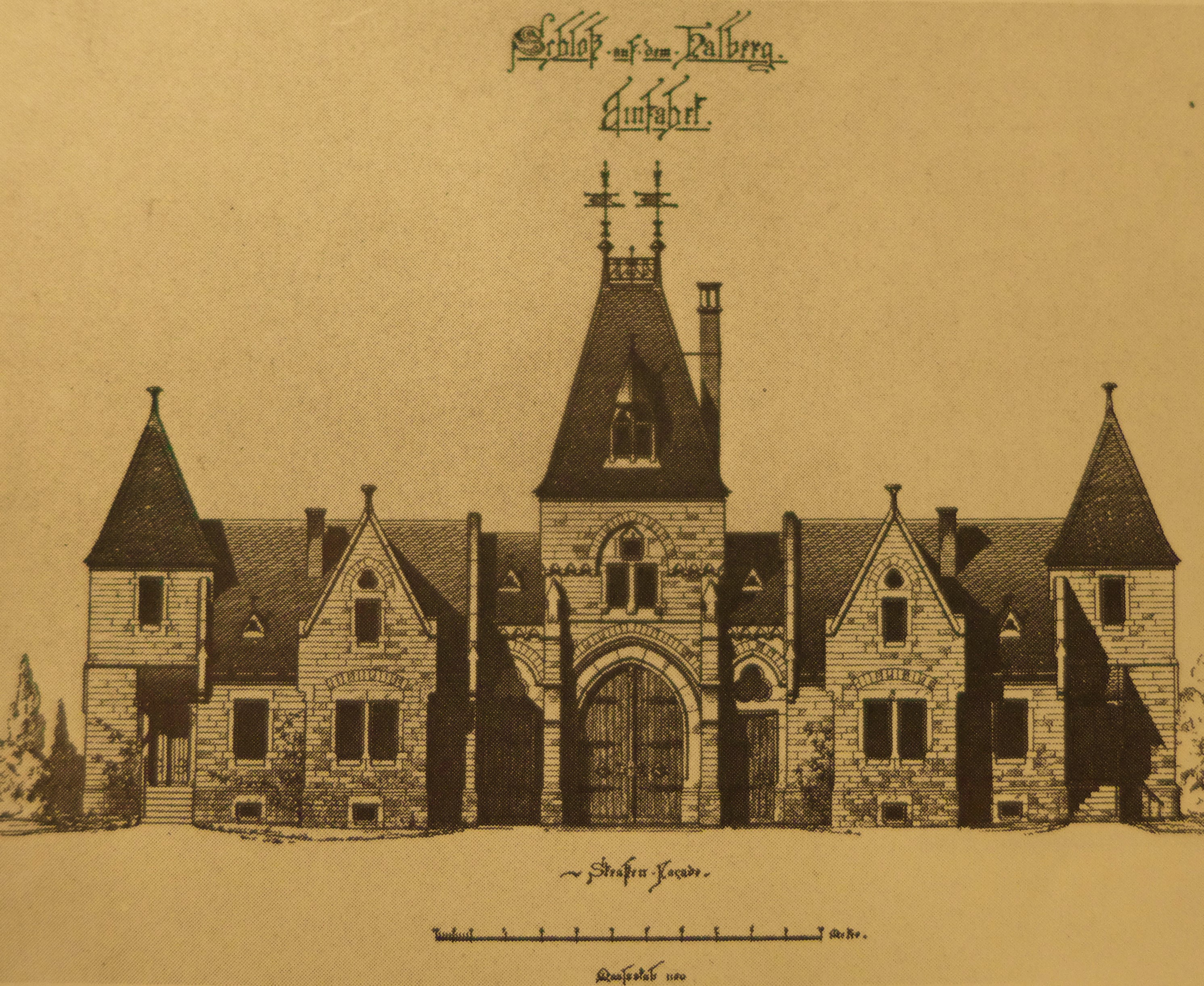
Façade of the gate building

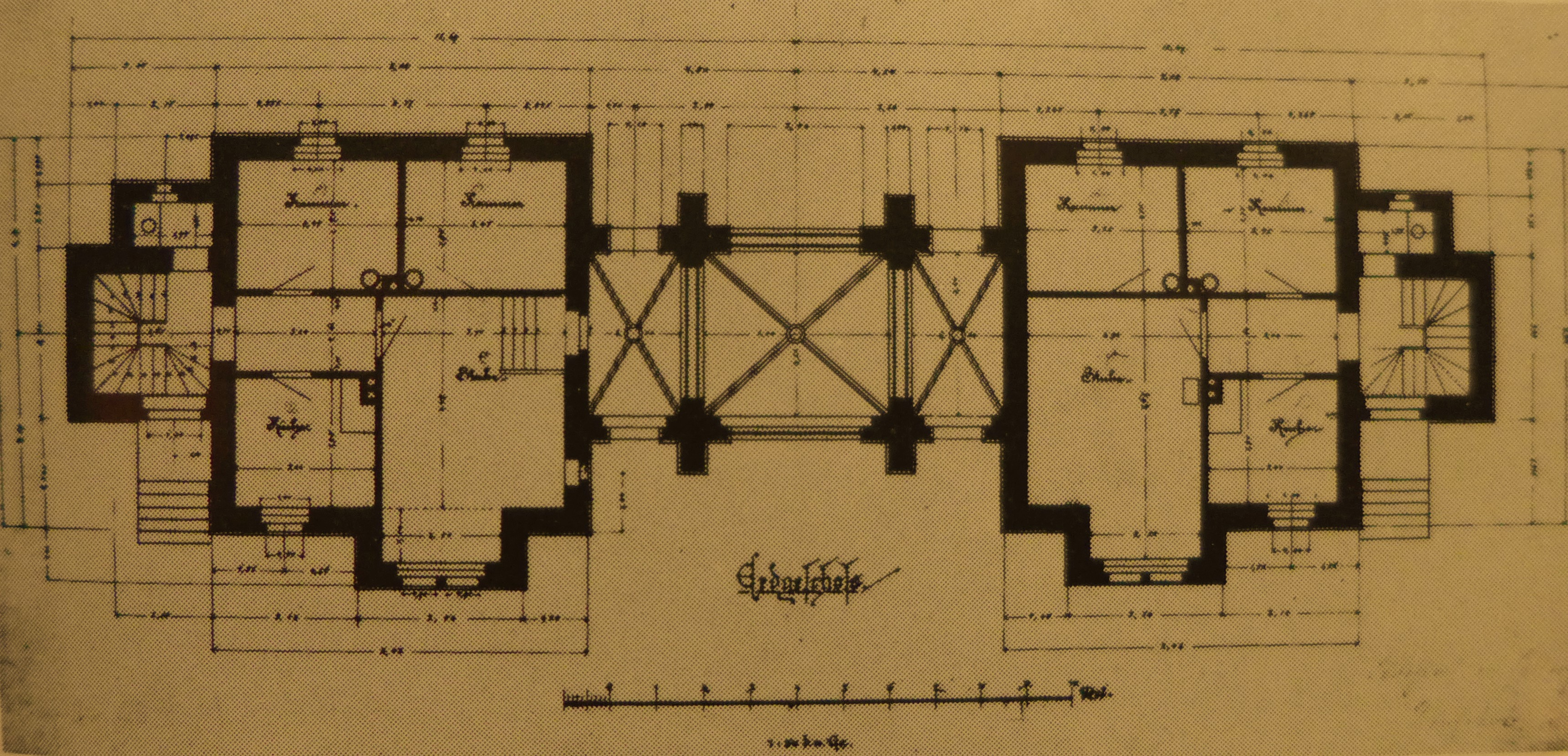
Floor plan of the gate building

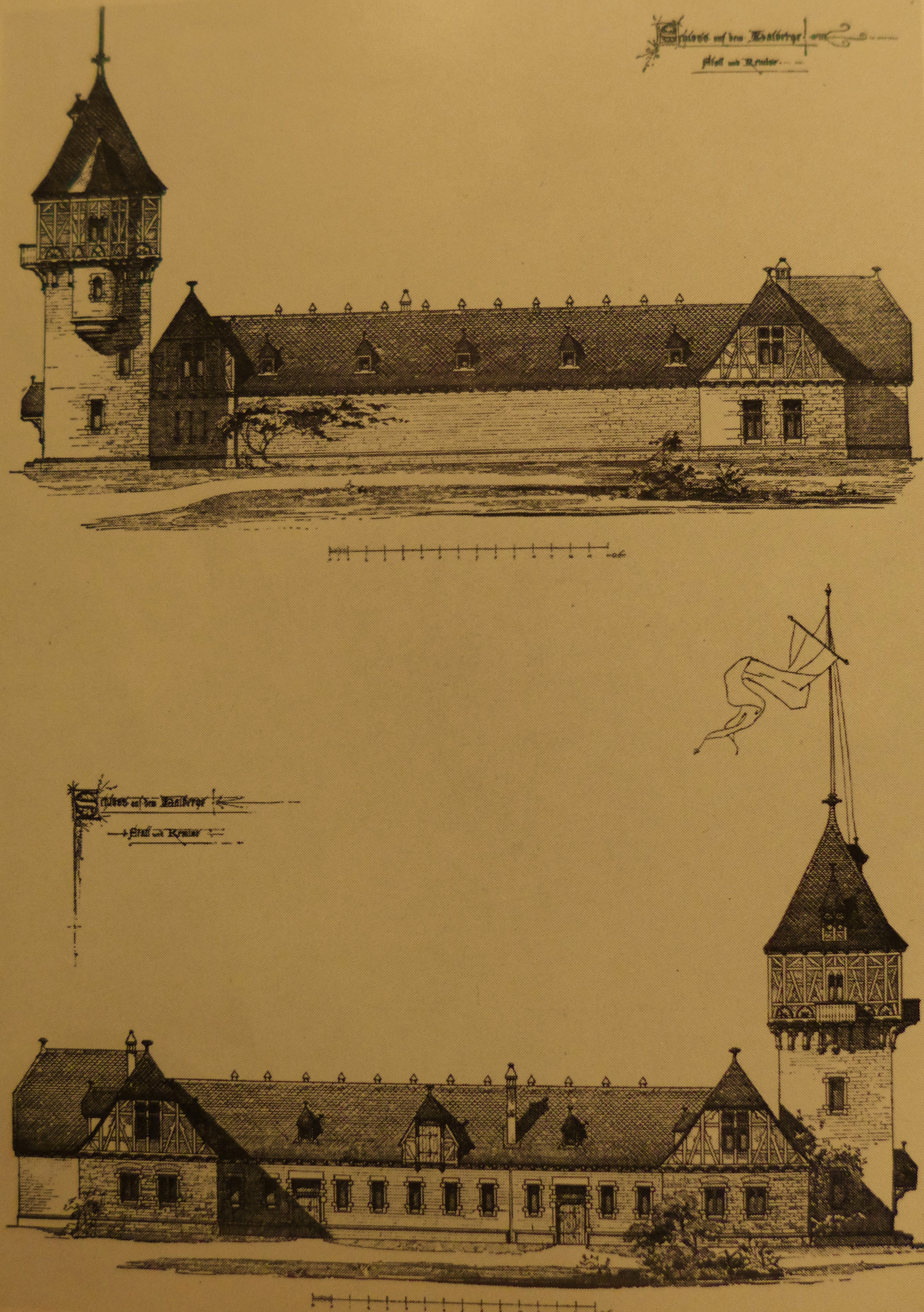
Three-wing stable and coach house (with water tower) (Note: Demolished in 1969 in favor of the new Saarland Radio conference building.)

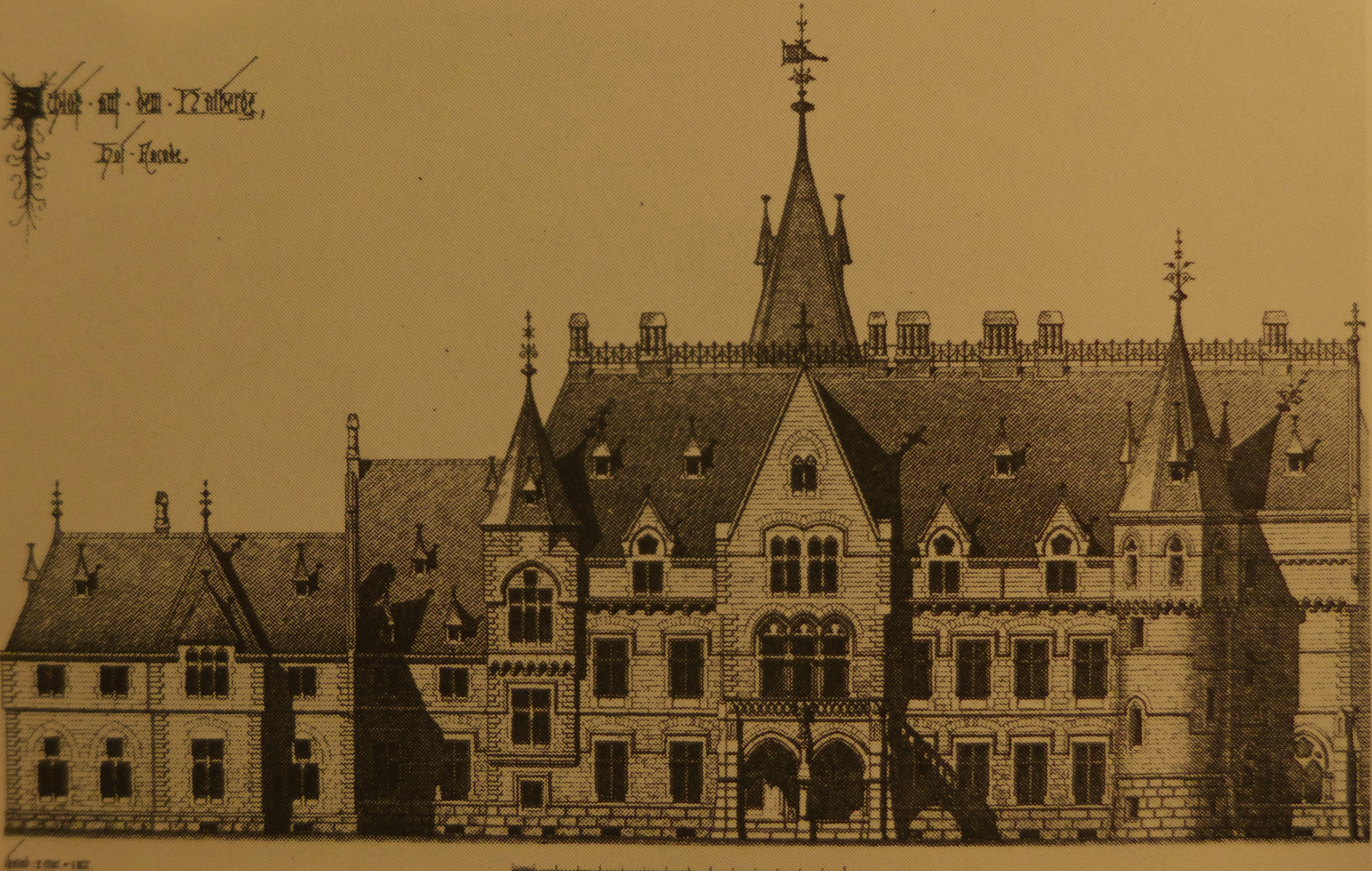
Entrance façade

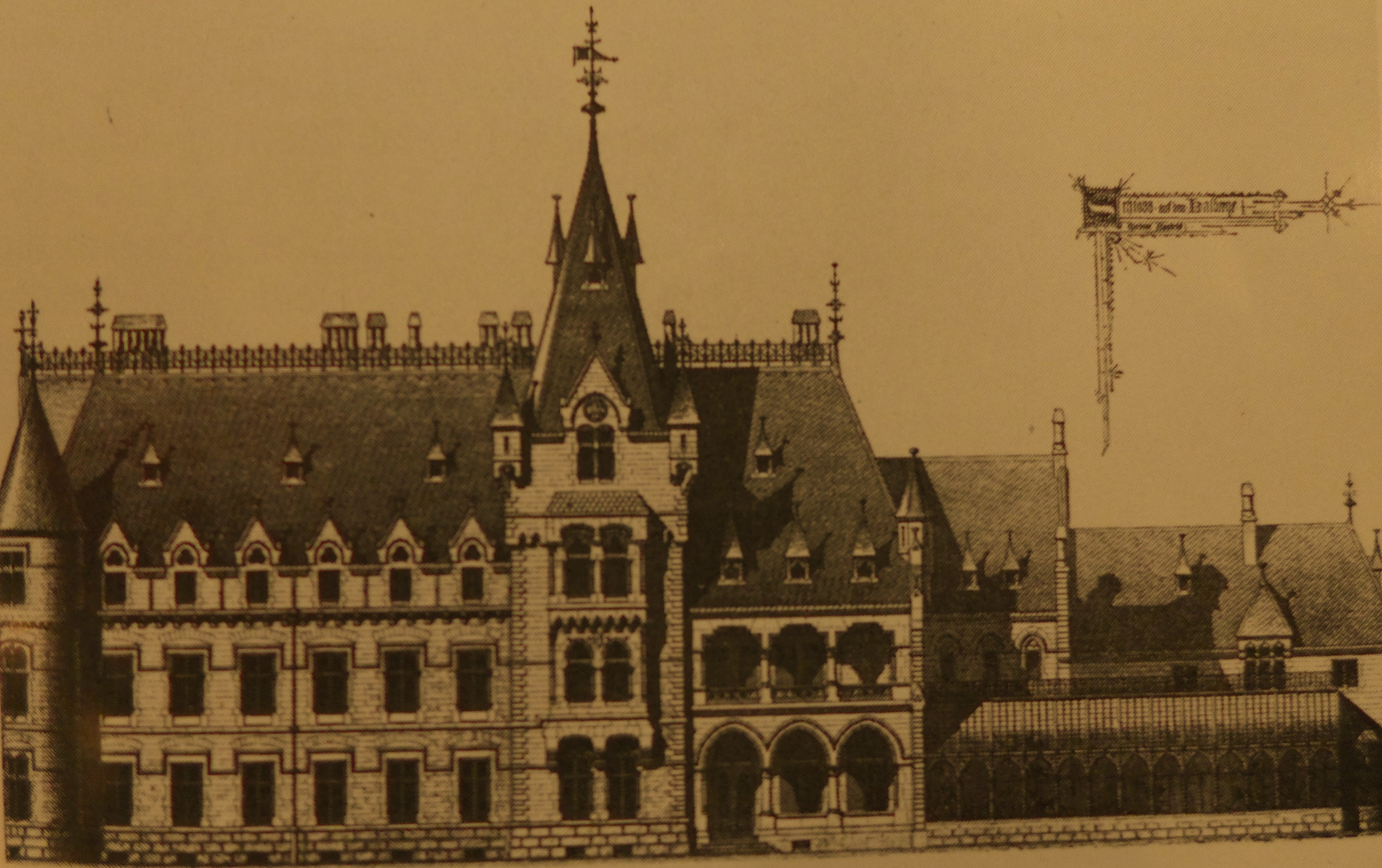
Garden side with original wooden pergola

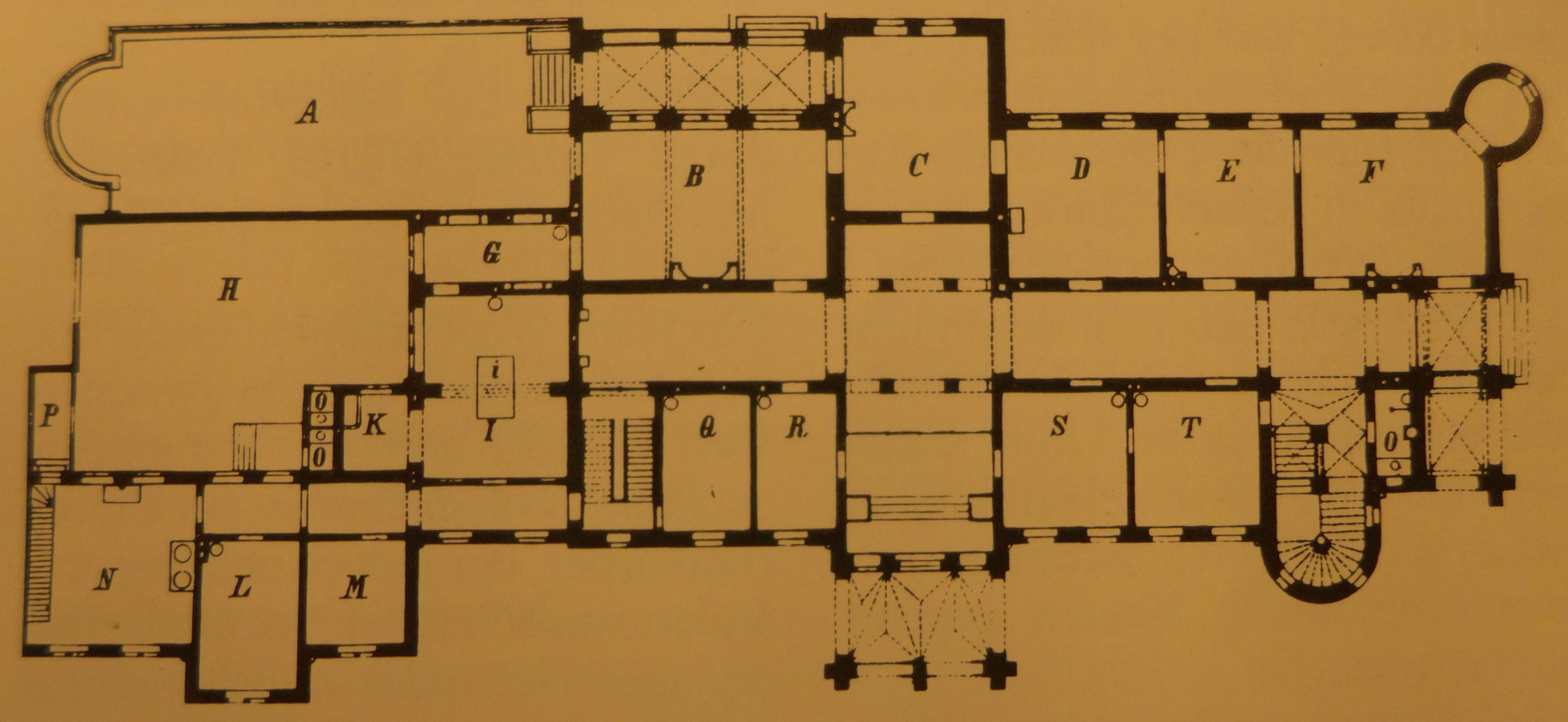
Floor plan of the ground floor

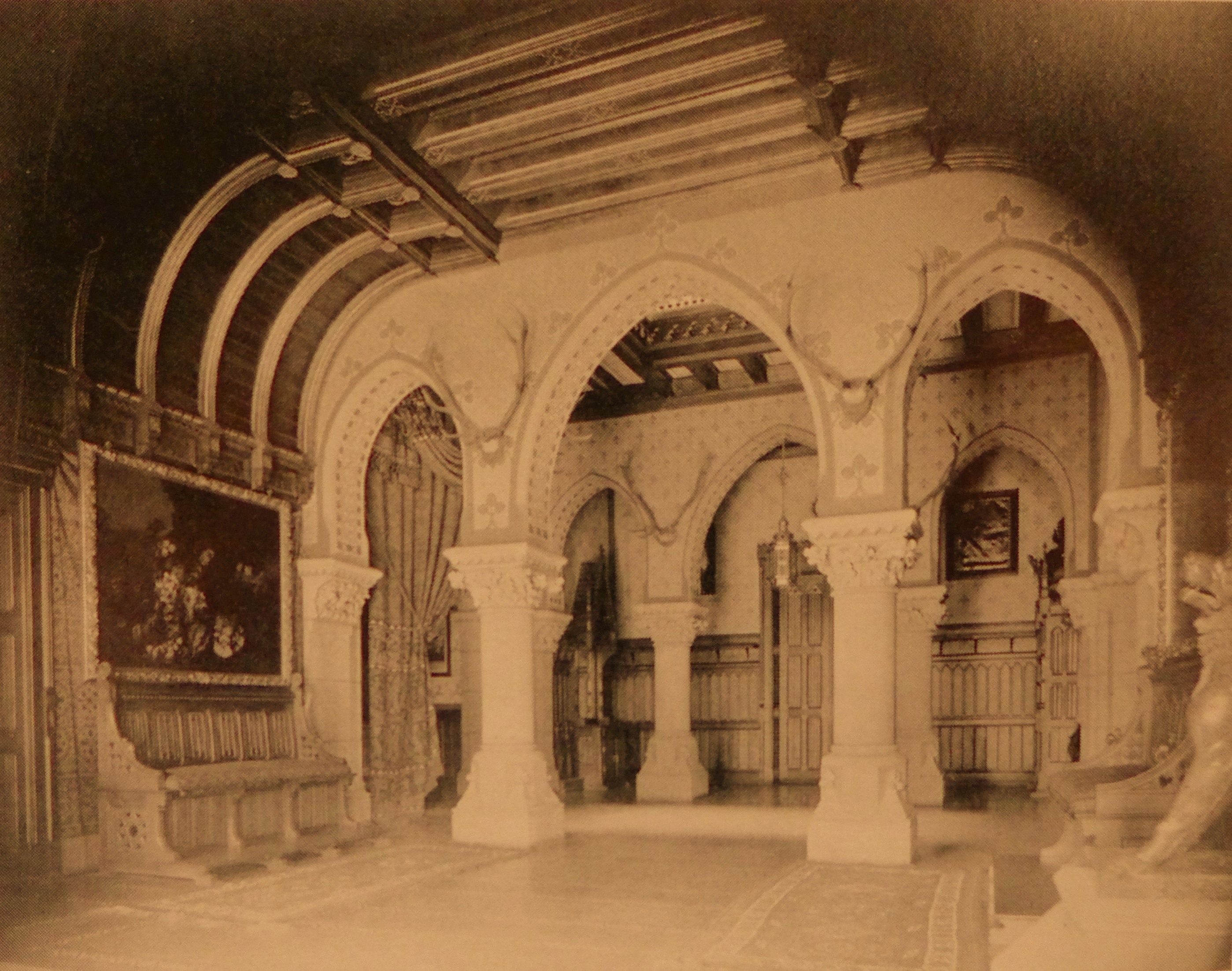
Entrance hall

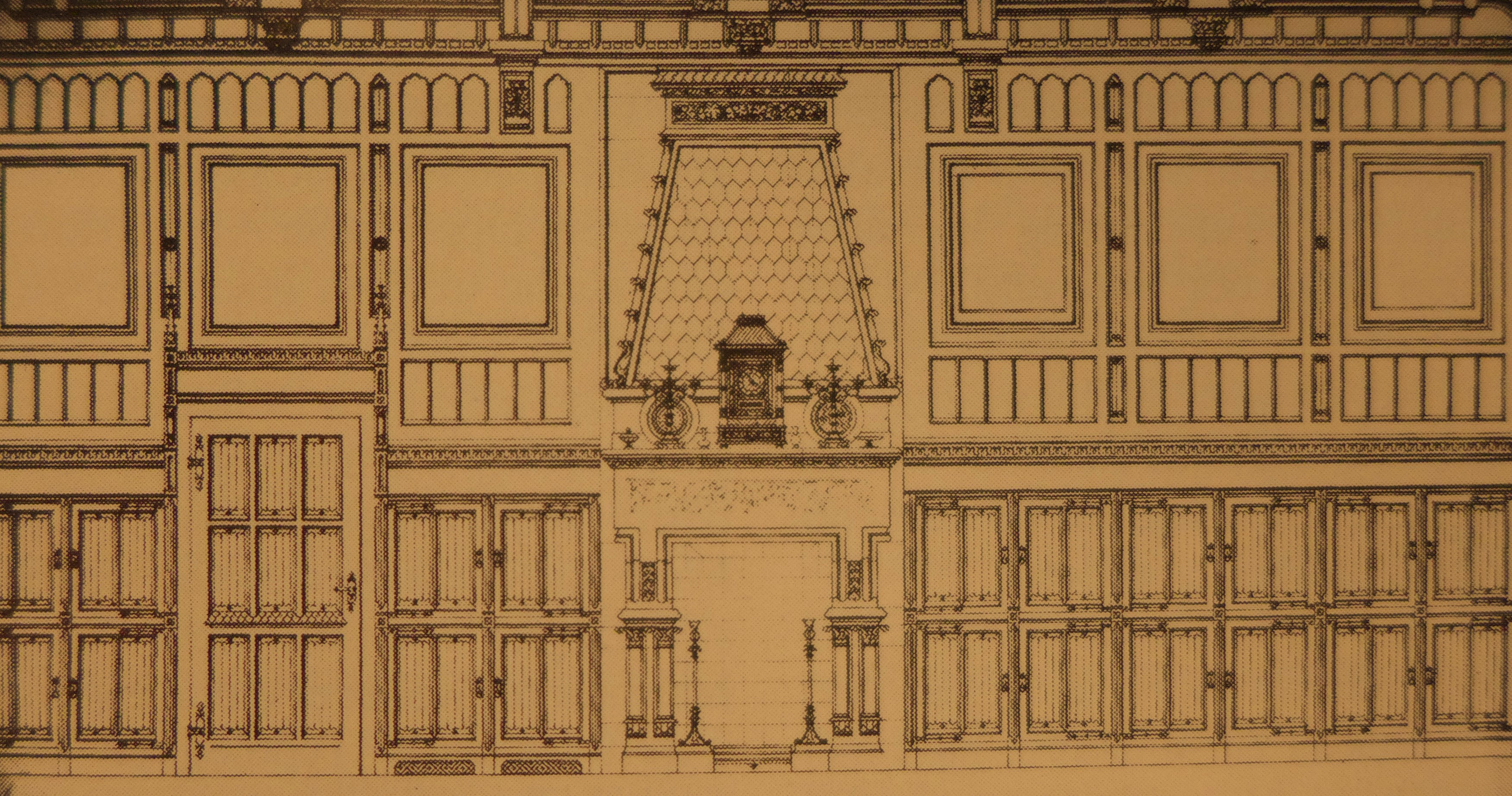
Dining room, fireplace wall

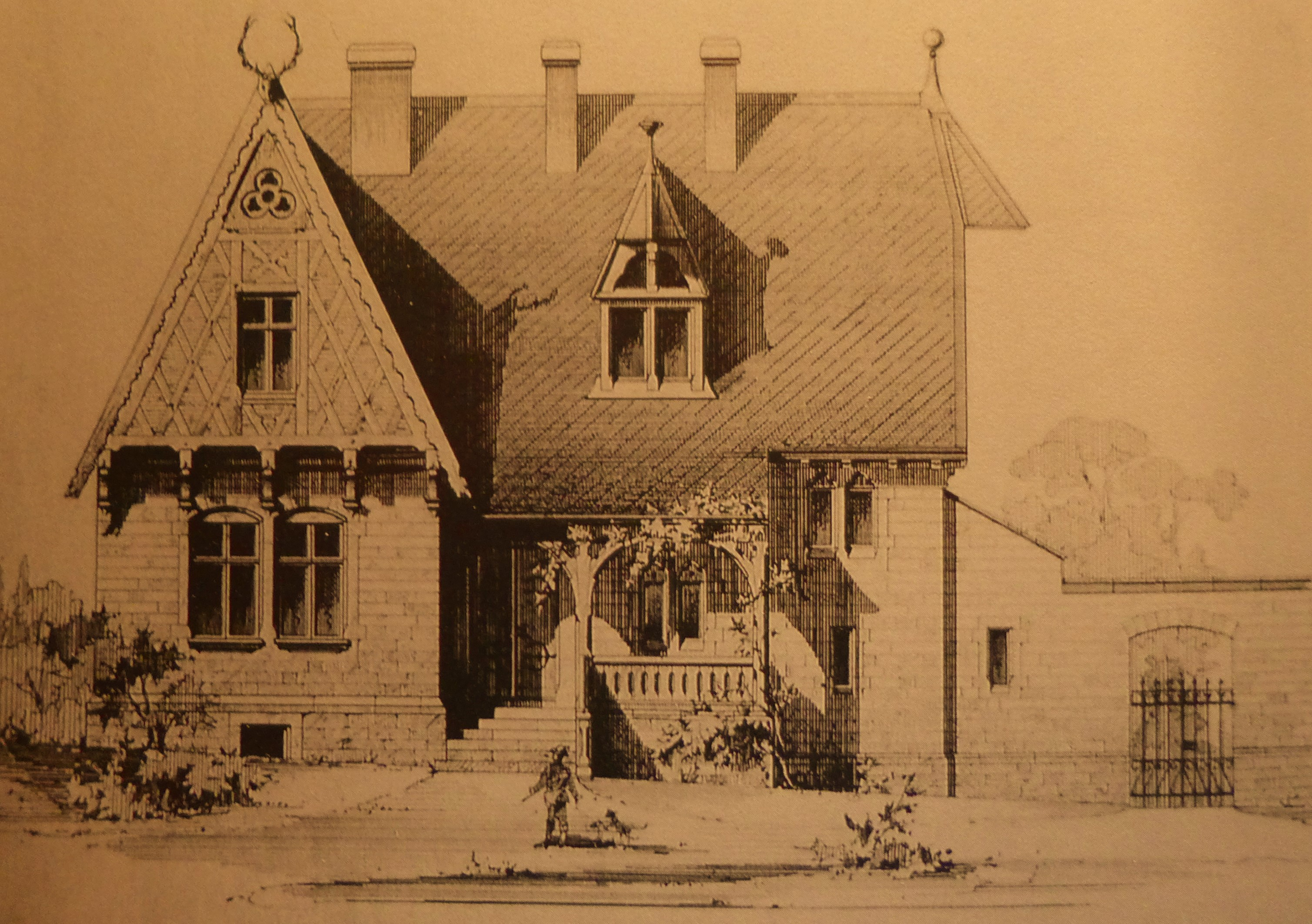
Forester's apartment (unbuilt)

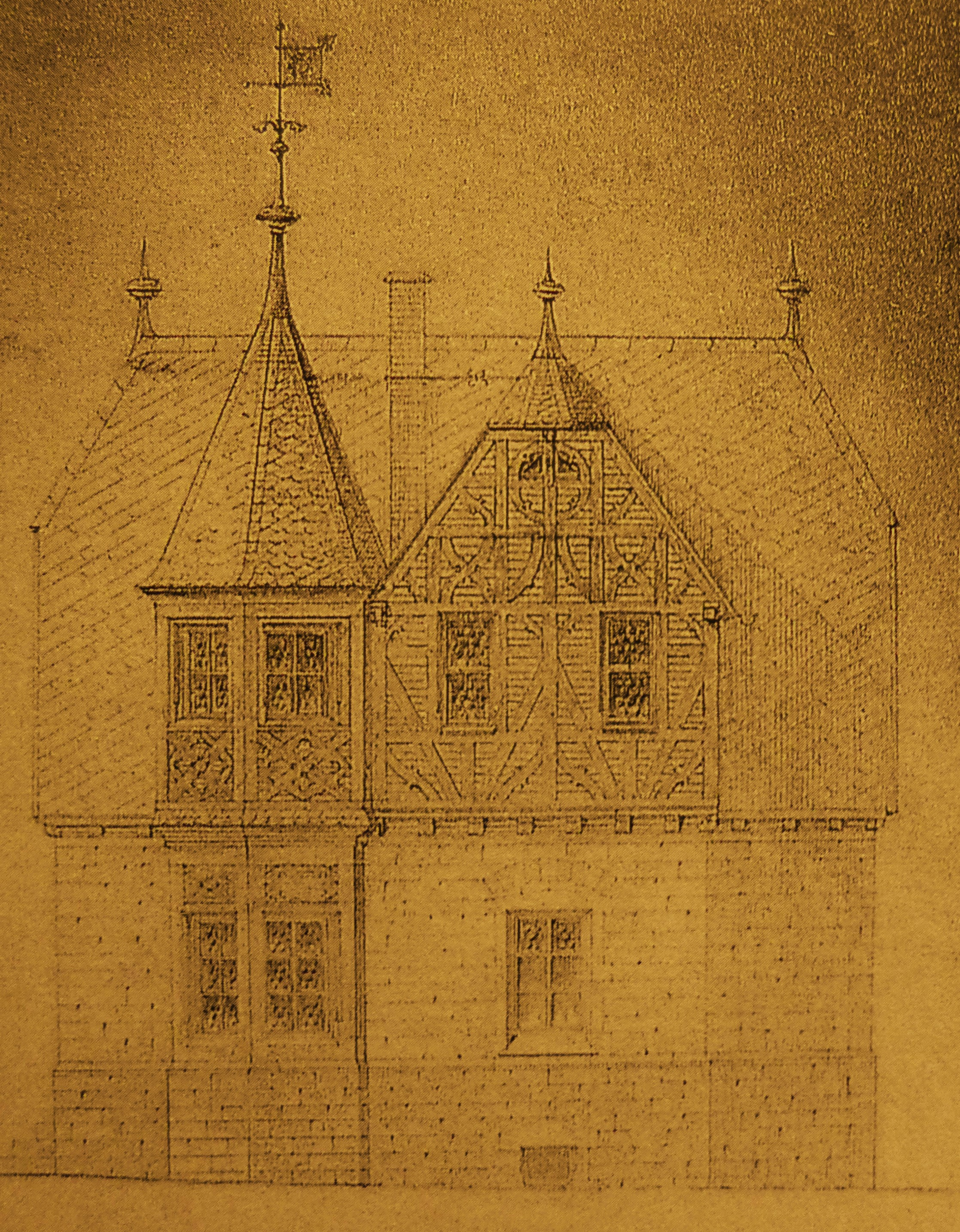
Servant's house

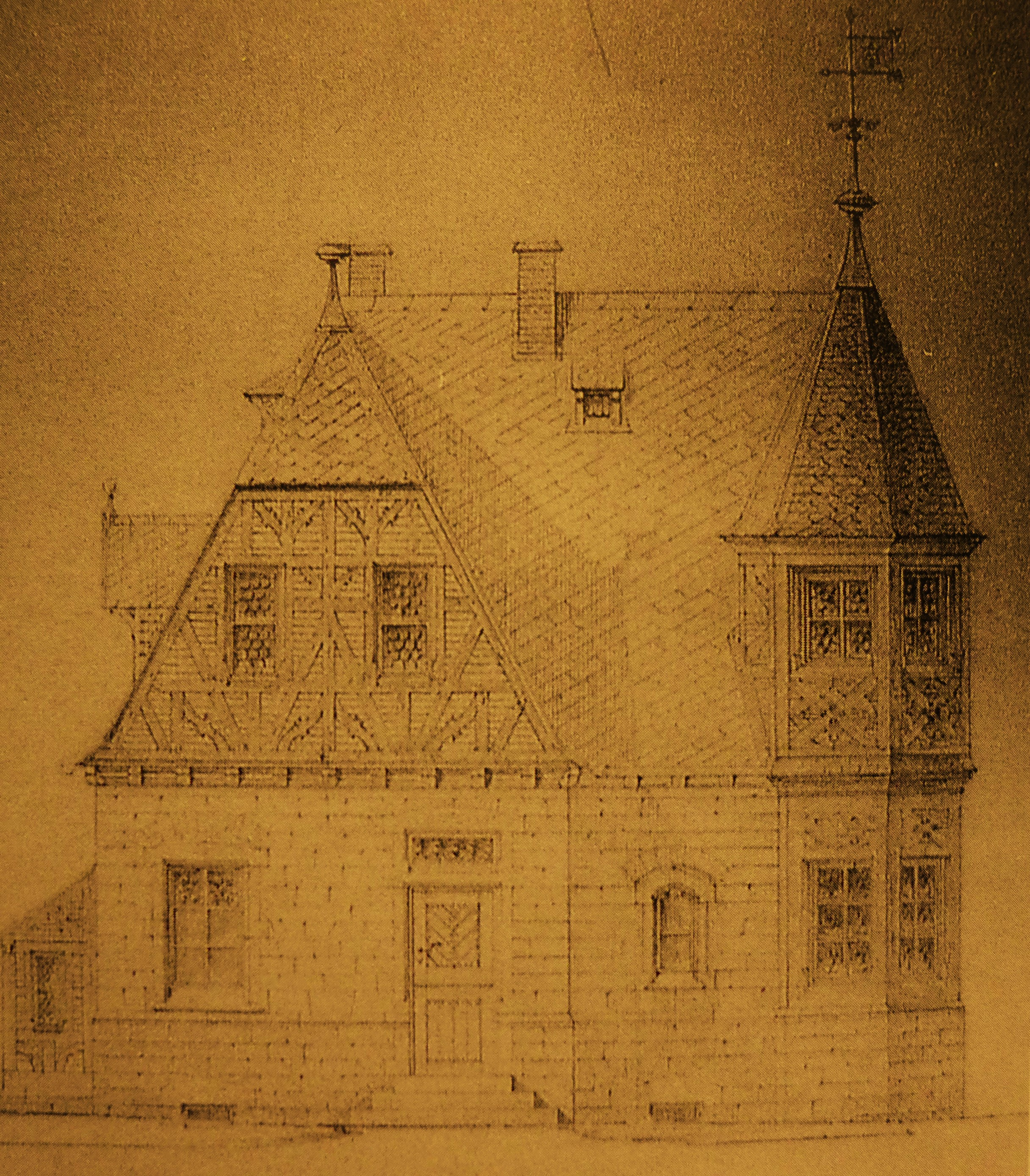
Servant's house
