= Edwin Oppler =

German architect

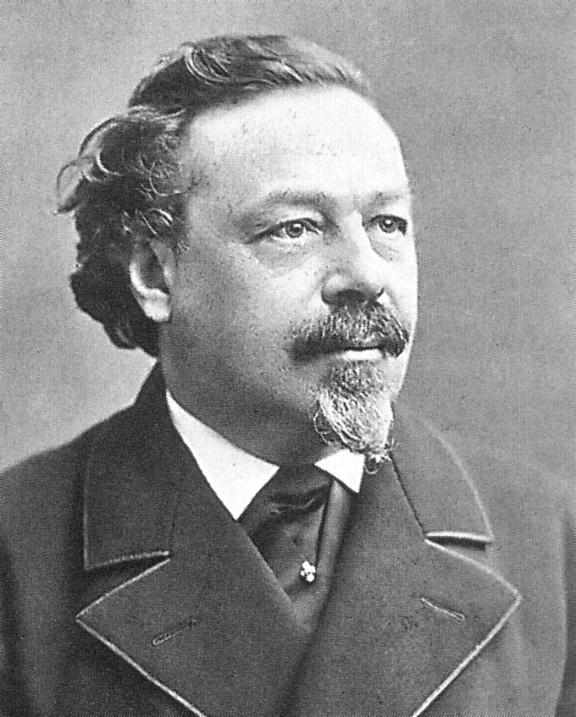
Edwin Oppler (date unknown)

Edwin Oppler (18 June 1831, in Oels – 6 September 1880, in Hanover) was a German architect of Jewish ancestry, and a major representative of the Neo-Gothic style. He designed several synagogues, throughout Germany, all of which were destroyed by rioters on Kristallnacht.

== Biography ==
He was the second son of Saloh Oppler, a wine merchant, and his wife Minna, née Seldis. Very little is known about his childhood, except that he attended primary school in Oels from 1837 to 1840, then went to school in Breslau. In 1849, he went to Hanover, where he studied with Conrad Wilhelm Hase at the Technical University until 1854. This was followed by an apprenticeship as a carpenter.

After becoming a member of the Architekten- und Ingenieur-Verein Hannover in 1856, he spent the next four years in Brussels and Paris, where he worked in the offices of Hoffmann & Massenot, with the stained glass artist, Eugène-Stanislas Oudinot and, primarily, with the architect Eugène Viollet-le-Duc. It was in the latter capacity that he became involved in the restoration of Notre Dame, and acquired his knowledge of Gothic architecture. He returned to Hanover in 1861.

In 1866, the year he was appointed a building officer, he married Ella Cohen, daughter of the Royal Physician, Hermann Cohen. They had four sons: Ernst, a painter and etcher; Alexander, a sculptor; Berthold, a doctor; and Siegmund, a jurist.

He established himself in the Jewish community through numerous commercial and residential buildings, designed for noble and bourgeois clients, but mostly through his synagogues and designs for Jewish cemeteries. From 1872 to 1878 he published a magazine, Die Kunst im Gewerbe (Commercial Art) and operated a studio together with Ferdinand Schorbach.

Many of his buildings were destroyed by bombing in World War II. One of his largest and most familiar, the Neue Synagoge in Hanover, was burnt during the anti-Jewish riots known as "Kristallnacht", in 1938.

He died from what was apparently a rapid onset of heart disease, aged only forty-nine.

== Selected projects ==
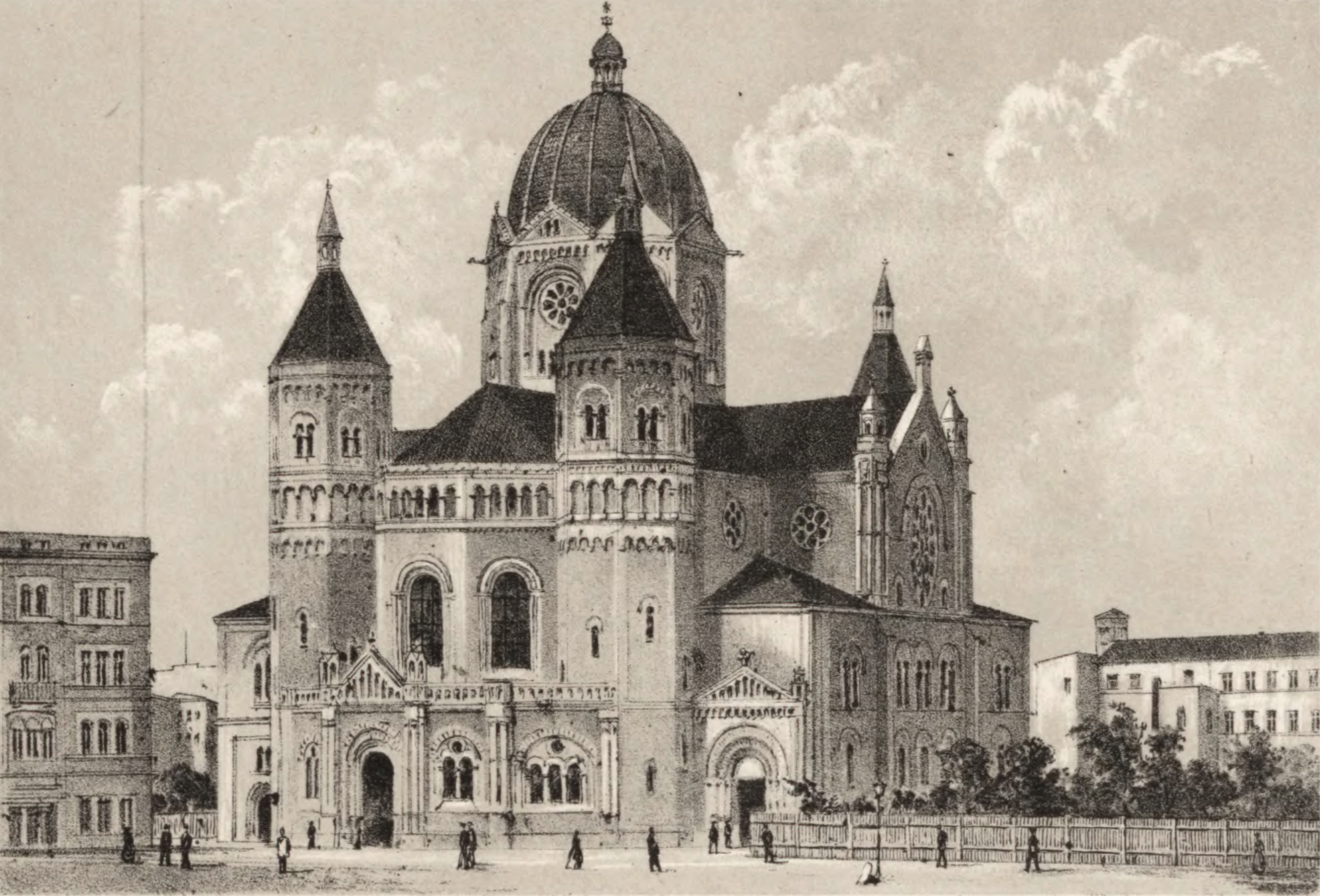
Neue Synagoge, Breslau

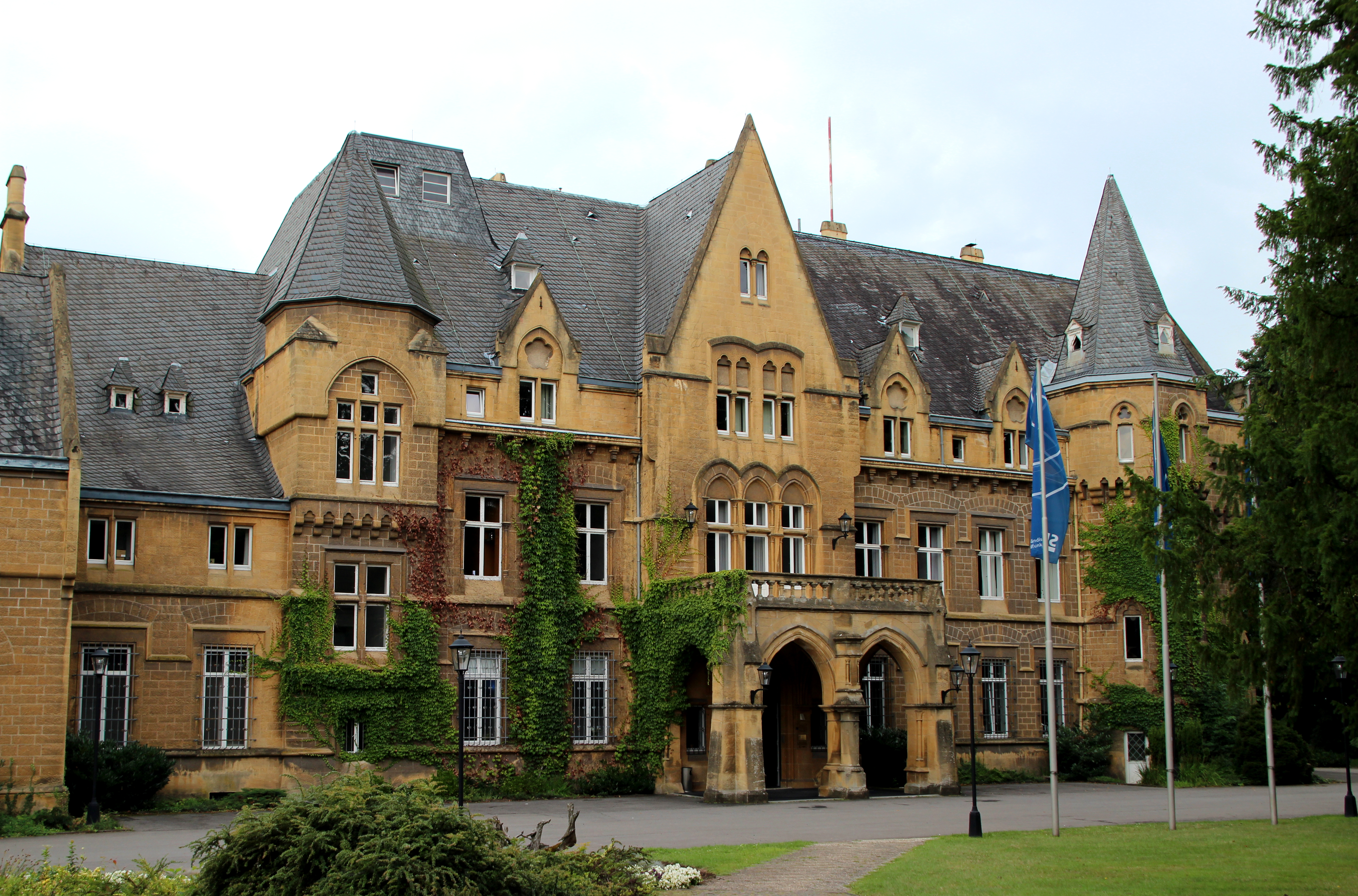
Schloss Halberg

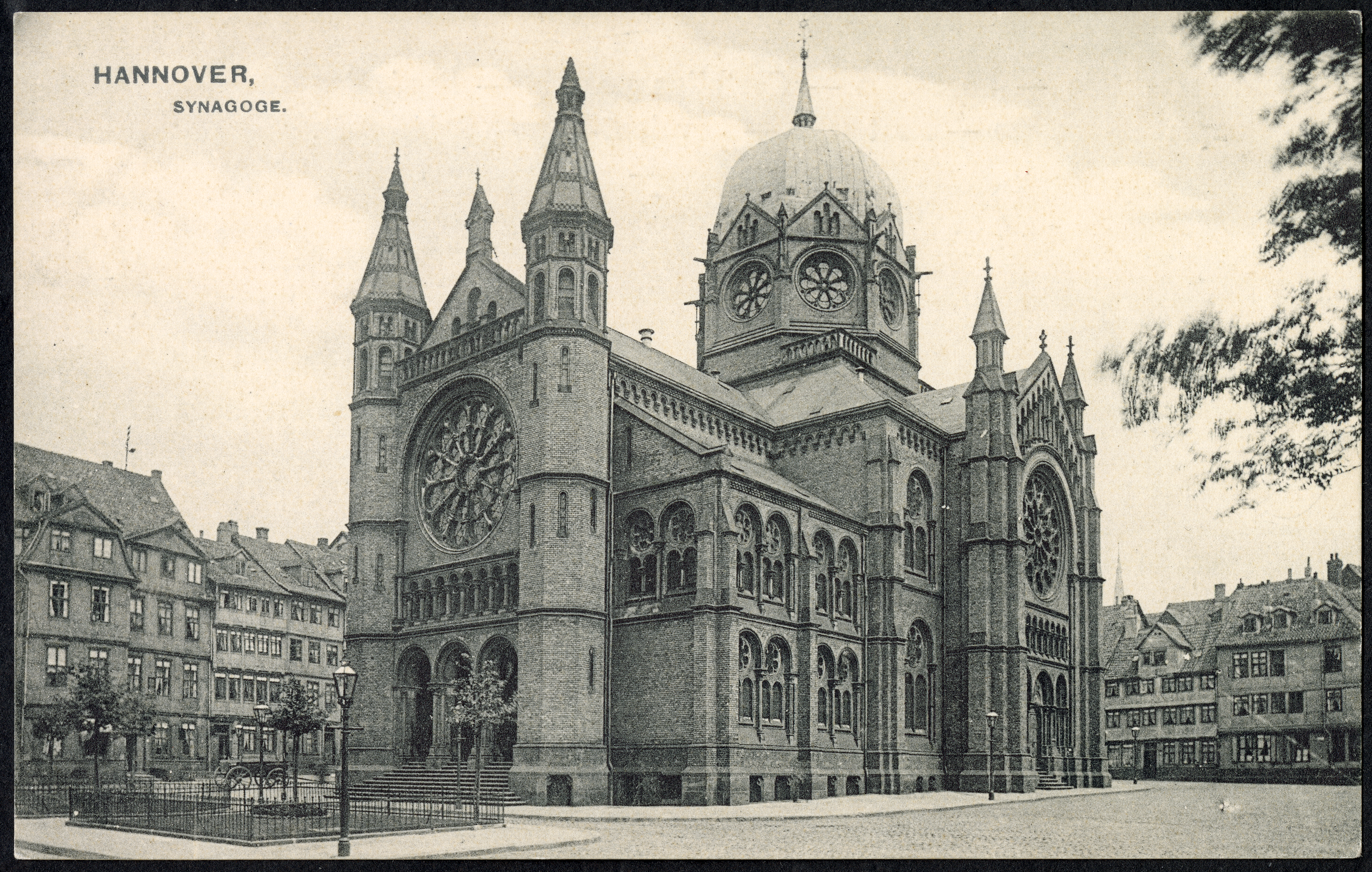
Neue Synagoge, Hanover

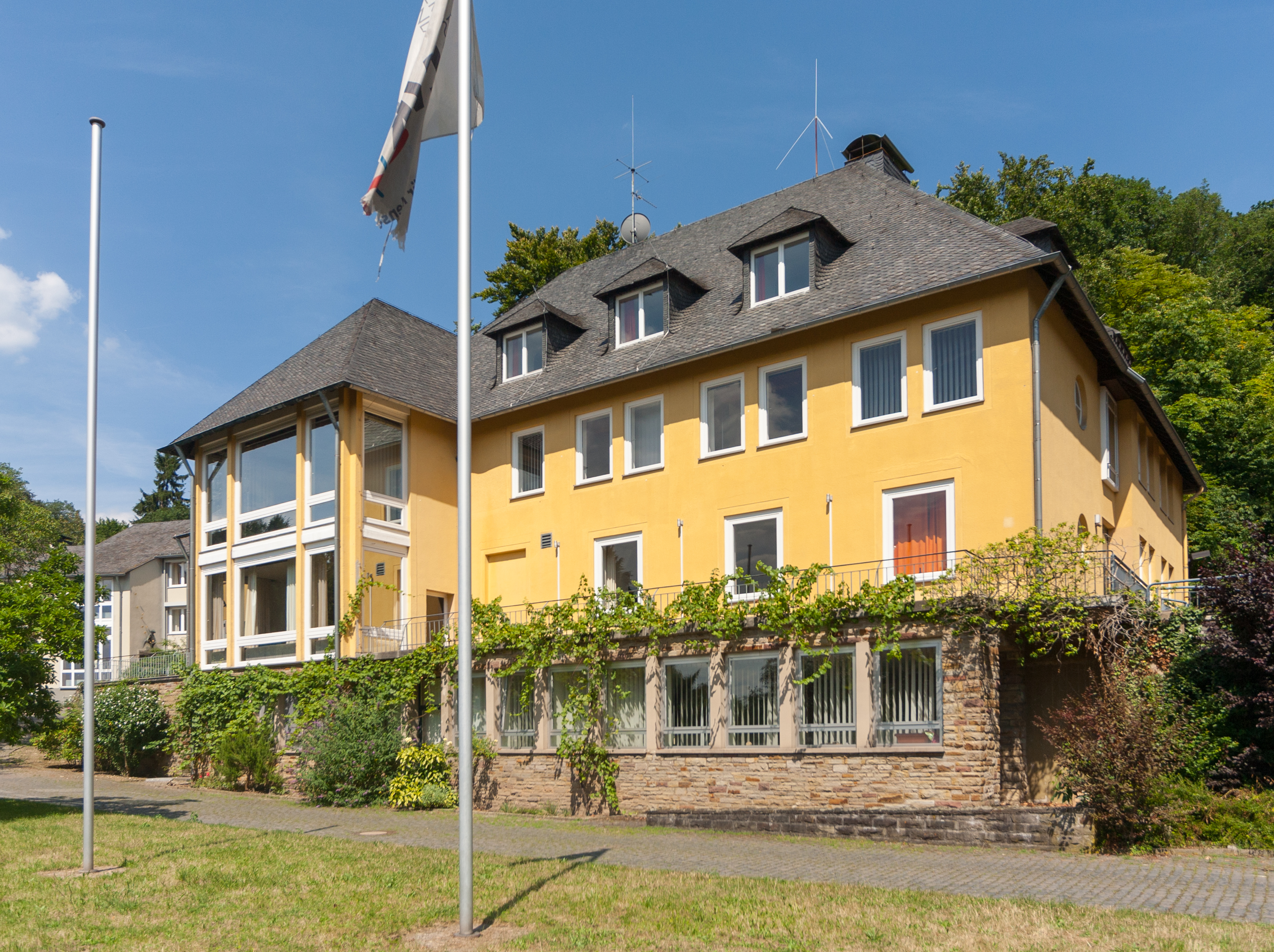
Haus Helsterberg
