= United States–West Germany relations =

- United States: West Germany

Diplomatic mission
- Embassy of the United States, Bonn: Embassy of Germany, Washington, D.C.

The United States and West Germany maintained close relations built upon on political, economic, and military cooperation, and a shared hostility against East Germany and the Soviet Union. Both countries viewed East Germany as a proxy state for Soviet interests, which they believed could have undermined stability in the region, especially regarding the status of Berlin.

The relationship was one of the closest the United States had with any country during the Cold War. Relations formally began in 1955 and after German reunification relations have continued under the current German Republic following the collapse of East Germany.

== History ==
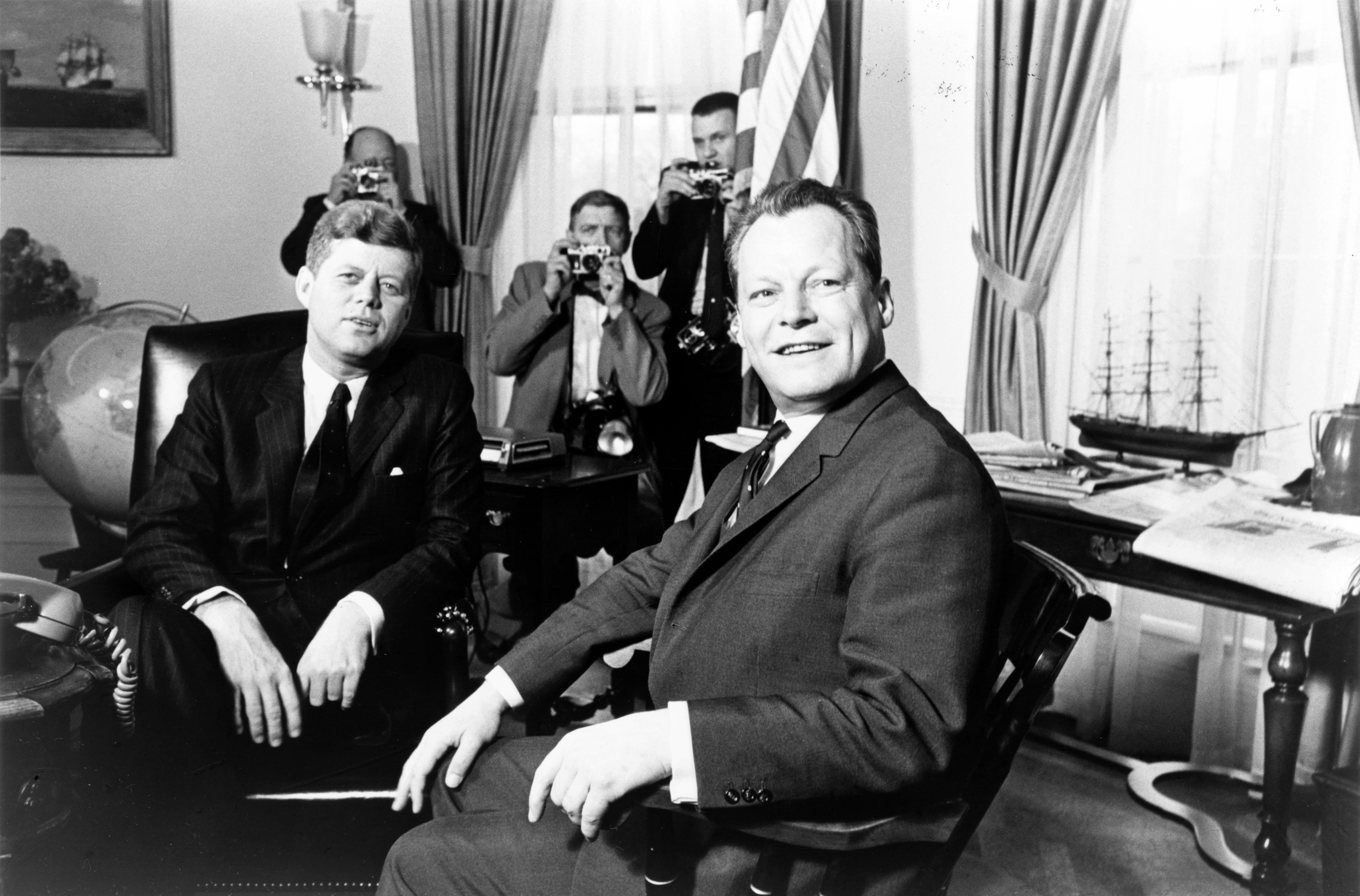
John F. Kennedy meeting with Willy Brandt, in the White House, March 13, 1961.

Following Germany's surrender in 1945 on May 8, 1945, the U.S. occupied Germany until 1949. The Soviet Union's occupied German Zone was what would become East Germany (GDR) being formally founded on October 7, 1949. The response by the U.S. was that it would not recognize the establishment of the East German state and that it was "without any legal validity," and that it would "continue to give full support to the Government of the German Federal Republic at Bonn in its efforts to restore a truly free and democratic Germany." Efforts to restore Germany under one nation collapsed which led to West Germany and the U.S. establishing formal relations on May 6, 1955.

=== Eisenhower administration ===
From April 6–17, 1953, Chancellor Konrad Adenauer became the first leader of West Germany to visit the United States. He arrived on the sixth in New York City before flying to Washington where he visited from April 7 to 9 and met with President Dwight D. Eisenhower. This marked the first interaction by leaders of both countries. From April 10–17, Adenauer took an eight-day tour of the United States visiting San Francisco, Carmel-by-the-Sea, Chicago, New York, and Boston before leaving on the seventeenth to Canada and Bonn the following day.

On October 29, 1954, the U.S. and West Germany signed the Treaty of Friendship, Commerce and Navigation between the United States of America and the Federal Republic of Germany, in Washington, D.C. The treaty entered into force two years later on July 14, 1956.

On July 1, 1955, Konrad Adenauer was one of several invited heads of state/government who attended the completed renovation ceremony of the Eisenhower house and farm and the thirty-ninth wedding anniversary of Dwight and Mamie Eisenhower in Cumberland Township, Pennsylvania.

From August 26–27, 1959, Eisenhower became the first American President to visit West Germany where he held informal meetings with Konrad Adenauer, and President Theodor Heuss. Eisenhower was greeted on the runway of Bonn Airport by Adenauer. Still, on the runway, Eisenhower addressed the crowd of more than one hundred thousand German citizens where he stated, "In my country, the name Adenauer has come to symbolize the determination of the German people to remain strong and free. And the American people stand by your stand in assuring that the loyal free people of free Berlin will like yourselves will continue always to enjoy that great privilege." Adenauer made a brief remark where he called the United States the "standard bearer of freedom throughout the world". Both men rode through the streets of Bonn waving to crowds.

=== Kennedy administration ===
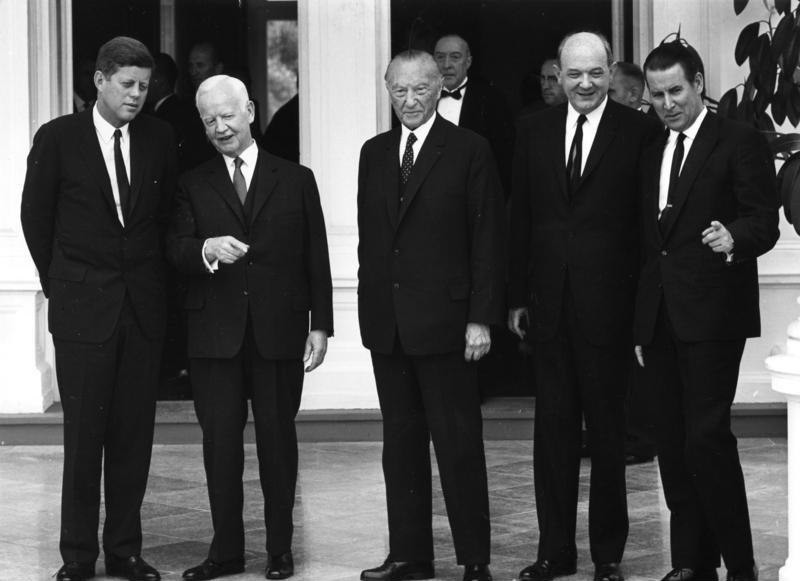
Kennedy (left) with Adenauer at Hammerschmidt Villa in Bonn, June 23, 1963.

After John F. Kennedy was elected President, relations between the U.S. and West Germany became closer which continued after his tenure in office as meetings between senior leaders from both countries became constant. On March 13, 1961, Willy Brandt, then the Mayor of West Berlin met with Kennedy at the White House over the status of Berlin.

From April 12–13, Adenauer met with Kennedy at the White House for the first time and was the first meeting between senior leaders since 1959. On the sixteenth, Adenauer and then-Vice President Lyndon Johnson visited Johnson's home state of Texas.

On April 20, Adenauer exchanged a letter with Kennedy on the Cuban Missile Crisis where Adenauer states he was informed by Lyndon Johnson over the crisis describing it as being further aggravated by Soviet leader Nikita Khrushchev.

==== Berlin Crisis ====
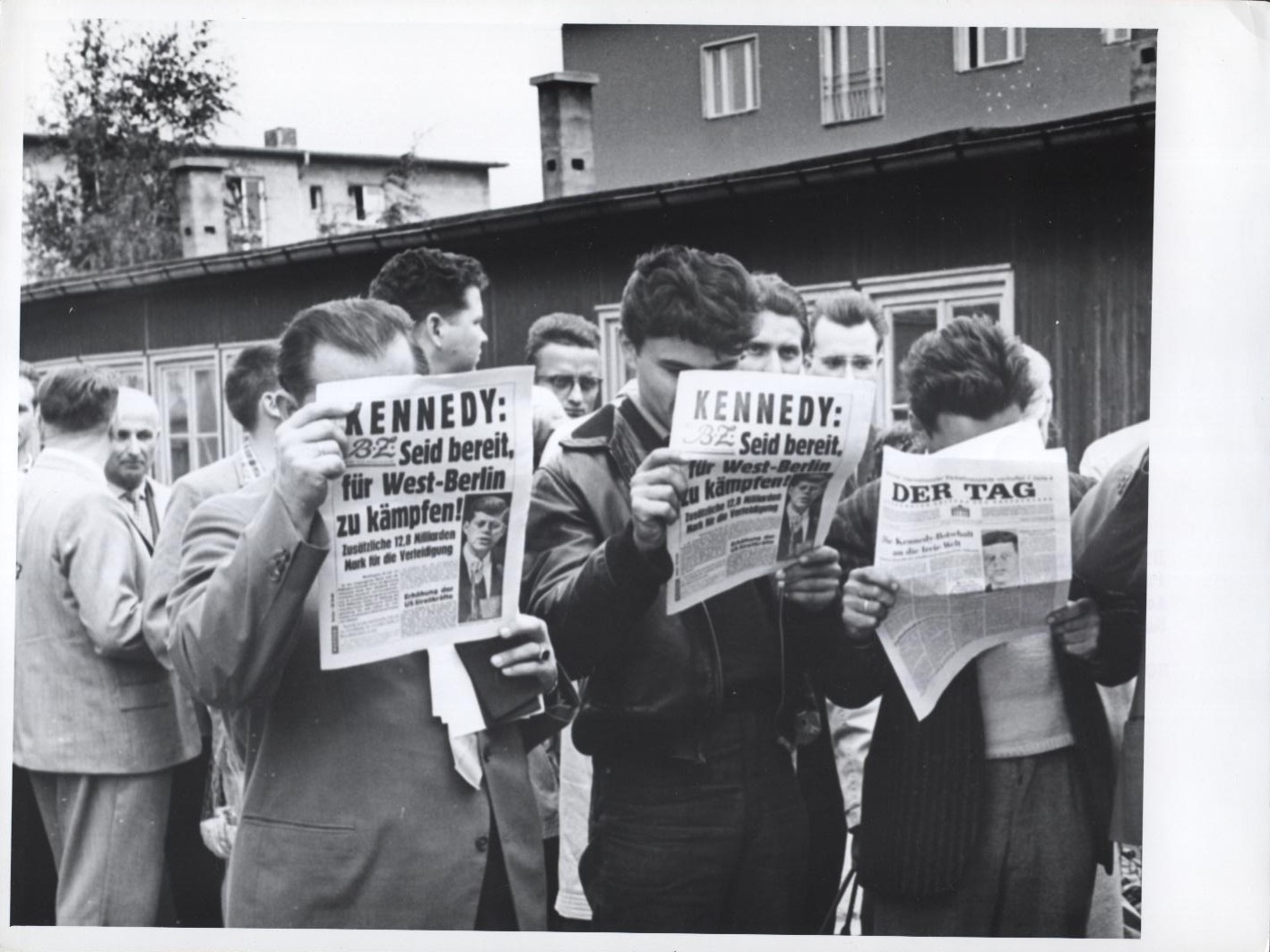
East German refugees reading news accounts of President John F. Kennedy’s July 25, 1961, address to the American people about the growing conflict with the Soviet Union over the status of Berlin.

On July 25, 1961, Kennedy gave a televised address from the Oval Office on the Berlin Crisis. Kennedy described Berlin as "the great testing place of Western courage and will". Kennedy warned the nation to assume that nuclear war was possible and requested from the U.S. Congress $3.27 billion dollars of appropriations for the U.S. Armed Forces, increasing the Army's size from 870,000 men to approximately one million, an increase of 29,000 and 63,000 men respectively in active duty strength of the Navy and the Air Force. Ships and planes that were headed for retirement to be retained or reactivated, increasing airpower tactically and sealift, airlift, and anti-submarine warfare capability. B-47 bombers that were to be deactivated were to be delayed. $1.8 billion, which was about half of the total sum was requested for the procurement of non-nuclear weapons, ammunition, and equipment.

Kennedy stated in his address that on the following day he would request from Congress funds to protect American citizens from a potential nuclear fallout over Berlin which was, "to identify and mark space in existing structures, public and private, that could be used for fall-out shelters in case of attack; to stock those shelters with food, water, first-aid kits and other minimum essentials for survival; to increase their capacity; to improve our air-raid warning and fallout detection systems, including a new household warning system which is now under development; and to take other measures that will be effective at an early date to save millions of lives if needed."

Kennedy's government faced a dramatic increase in the defense budget. The negative balance of payments with the European allies had aggravated American fiscal problems. In late-1961, US Defense Secretary Robert McNamara concluded an arrangement with West Germany whereby the latter was to annually purchase some American military hardware. However, this only partially alleviated the payments issue.

Kennedy ordered 500 military men to travel on trucks through East Germany to West Berlin to ensure that the West preserved the land-link to the city. In late October 1961, a dispute over the right of one U.S. diplomat to cross East Berlin flared into conflict. Soviet and American tanks faced one another at Checkpoint Charlie, but Kennedy through an intermediary offered Nikita Khrushchev a conciliatory formula and both superpowers withdrew their tanks.

On August 13, 1961, East Germany suddenly erected a temporary barbed wire barricade and then a concrete barrier, dividing Berlin known as the Berlin Wall. Kennedy noted that "it seem[ed] particularly stupid to risk killing millions of Americans... because Germans want[ed] Germany to be reunified".

In August 1961, Kennedy and Willy Brandt began letter exchanges over the Berlin crisis. The first letter was sent by Brandt on August 16. Brandt urged in his letter for direct action against the East Germans and the Soviets. Brandt went on to describe the Communist encroachment as "the most serious in the postwar history of this city since the (1948) blockade." And criticized Kennedy stating, "While in the past Allied Commandants have even protested against parades by the so-called National People’s Army in East Berlin, this time, after military occupation of the East Sector by the People’s Army, they have limited themselves to delayed and not very vigorous steps." Brandt wanted the issue to be taken in front of the United Nations as he described the actions of the Soviets had "violated the Declaration of Human Rights in most flagrant manner." Brandt stated, "It would be welcomed if the American garrison were to be demonstratively strengthened."

Kennedy responded on August 18 stating that the U.S. will continue the buildup of military strength in response to the Soviet threat to Berlin and supported Brandt's proposal for a plebiscite to demonstrate West Berlin's destiny is its freedom in connection with the West.

However, Kennedy found Brandt's letter to be an attack over his handling of the crisis. Brandt had finished the letter with "I consider the situation serious enough, Mr. President, to write to you in all frankness as is possible only between friends who trust each other completely." Kennedy angrily waved the letter at his Press Secretary Pierre Salinger saying, "Trust? I don’t trust this man at all. He’s in the middle of a campaign against old Adenauer and wants to drag me in. Where does he get off calling me a friend!" Kennedy had rejected Brandt's ideas outside of troop deployment. Kennedy had shown the letter to war reporter Marguerite Higgins in disgust to which she responded, "Mr. President, I must tell you quite openly that in Berlin the suspicion is growing that you want to sell out the West Berliners".

In October, a US-Soviet war nearly occurred as U.S. and Soviet tanks faced off across Checkpoint Charlie. The crisis was defused largely through a backchannel communication the Kennedy administration had set up with Soviet spy Georgi Bolshakov.

==== Post-Berlin Crisis ====
From November 20–22, 1961, Adenauer visited the White House meeting with Kennedy. On the 21st a luncheon was held in his honor.

On February 20, 1962, Adenauer sent Kennedy a letter congratulating the success of John Glenn's space flight where he became the first American to orbit the Earth.

In response to the Spiegel affair, the United States felt the effort of the leaks of the assessment of West German military capabilities had undone diplomatic efforts between West and East Germany over Berlin. On April 30, Heinrich von Brentano visited Washington and met with Kennedy to restore the trust between Bonn and Washington and the common initiatives that Brentano created when he was Foreign Minister.

On October 5, Kennedy met with Willy Brandt and FRG ambassador to the United States Karl Heinrich Knappstein. The meeting came at a time where anti-American protests were occurring in Bonn. Kennedy sent Brandt a letter on November 14 in response to Brandt's letter from October 29 where he congratulated his handling of the Cuban Missile Crisis. Kennedy rejected Brandt's idea of a plebiscite over Berlin until Soviet intentions had become clearer and offered that Brandt should continue to develop unified German proposals.

On October 17, West German Foreign Minister Gerhard Schröder met with Kennedy at the White House. The Soviet Union believed that Schröder told Kennedy of West Germany intelligence reports of Soviet missiles in Cuba during the missile crisis. However, a secret recording of the meeting did not reveal any such conversation about Cuba, the missiles, or any intelligence reports. The meeting revolved around Berlin. Kennedy had not told the minister of such discovery by the U.S. of the missiles.

From November 14–15, Adenauer returned to the U.S. for a two-day visit at the White House. Kennedy alluded Adenauer's visit as a turning point between the East and West relations in reference to the Cuban Missile Crisis to which Adenauer congratulated Kennedy's success in handling the crisis. Adenauer was invited by Kennedy in a letter from October 10. On the seventeenth to downplay rumors of tension between the leaders, Kennedy sent a letter to Adenauer.

==== Ich bin ein Berliner ====
Ich bin ein Berliner (I am a Berliner) speech
Speech from the Rathaus Schöneberg by John F. Kennedy, June 26, 1963. Duration 9:01; "Ich bin ein Berliner" first appears at 1:45, then again at 8:43.

Ich bin ein Berliner ("I am a Berliner") speech (audio)
Audio-only version (Duration 9:22)

From June 23–26, 1963, Kennedy visited West Germany for the first time of his presidency and was the first by a sitting president since Eisenhower in 1959. Kennedy's visit came at a time of more increased tension between the United States and the Soviet Union. The trip was to unite the United States, West Germany, France, Canada, and the United Kingdom, and to reassure the German populace that U.S. was committed to the affairs of Europe and was increasing its presence contrary to the statements of French President Charles de Gaulle. Kennedy visited the cities of Bonn, Cologne, Frankfurt, and Wiesbaden.

On the twenty-sixth, Kennedy visited West Berlin and at Checkpoint Charlie delivered his famous "Ich bin ein Berliner" speech in front of 150,000 West Germans. While visiting the Berlin Wall, he remarked to his aides that the wall "is a hell of a lot better than a war".

=== Johnson administration ===
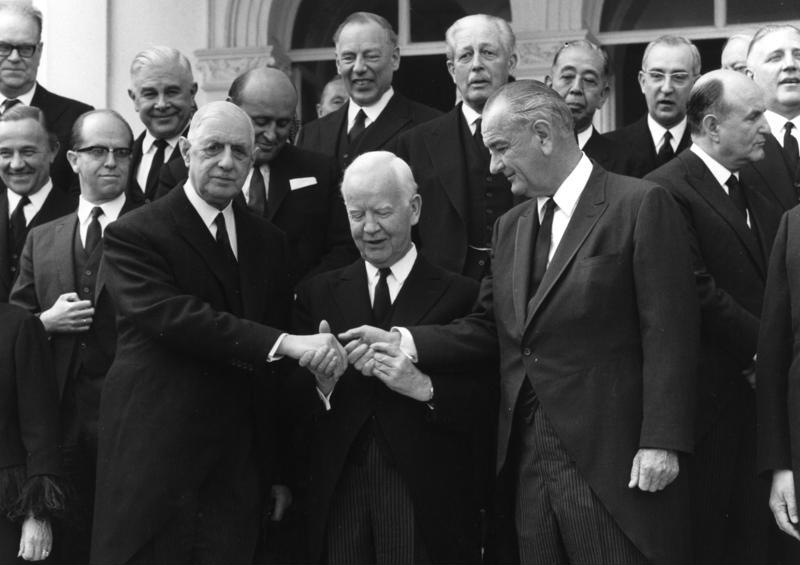
Lyndon Johnson (right) shaking hands with Charles de Gaulle (left) and Heinrich Lübke (center) in Bonn on April 25, 1967.

While serving as Vice President under Kennedy, Johnson visited West Germany from August 19–August 20, 1961. Meeting with Adenauer and Brandt, the men had discussed increasing military defense and an increase in American financial aid under the Mutual Security Act. Johnson gave a speech to a crowd in Berlin assuring Kennedy's pledge to keep the city's freedom. On the twentieth, Johnson took a tour of West Berlin meeting with U.S. soldiers of 1st Battalion, 8th Infantry Division. In order for the battalion to reach the western half of the city, they had crossed coming in from East Berlin in full battle armor in a convoy of nearly five hundred vehicles. Initially, State Department officials tried to dissuade Johnson from meeting the troops upon arrival. He retorted, "Who says I can’t go out there? The hell I can’t! With Stu and Rufe, I can go anywhere!" Johnson wanted to visit East Berlin but reluctantly abstained and allowed his trusted agents to tour East Berlin with a group of American officers.

Following Lyndon B. Johnson's accession to the presidency after Kennedy's assassination, relations between the two states still went uninterrupted with much of Kennedy's policies continued under Johnson. Chancellor Ludwig Erhard was scheduled to visit the U.S. on November 25, 1963, for an official visit to meet with President Kennedy. The planned meeting was reported in The Washington Post. However, Kennedy was assassinated on November 22.

Erhard did arrive on the twenty-fifth but to attend Kennedy's funeral. Erhard attended the funeral along with President Heinrich Lübke, Foreign Minister Gerhard Schröder, Defense Minister Kai-Uwe von Hassel, and Willy Brandt. The visit was rescheduled for December where he visited Texas from December 28–29, 1963. Johnson hosted Erhard at his ranch where they had a barbecue dinner in Erhard's honor. Erhard was gifted a cowboy hat by Johnson during the dinner.

Erhard returned to the U.S. for a three-day visit from June 11–13, 1964 where he held talks with Johnson at the White House, visited Cambridge, Massachusetts and New York City. The visit came at a crucial time as both leaders were deciding to restart talks with the Soviet Union over the Allied Control Council known as the Four Powers which was created after World War II. The meeting coincided with the onset of East Germany and the Soviet Union nearing completion of the Soviet–East German Treaty of Friendship that was signed on June 12. The Soviet Union had conferred with the U.S. that it would sign such a treaty two days prior on June 11.

From December 19–21, 1965, Erhard was invited back to the U.S. for talks with Johnson. On the twentieth, a state dinner was in Erhard's honor.

From September 26–27, 1966, Erhard visited the White House to hold talks with Johnson where Johnson proposed to Erhard to review the required strength of NATO forces stationed in Germany. During the meeting, Erhard asked Johnson for a moratorium on buying $1.35 billion of American military equipment before June 30, 1967. That evening a dinner was held with Erhard as the guest of honor.

Willy Brandt visited the U.S. for the first time as foreign minister from February 7–11, 1967. He was received by Johnson at the White House on February 8, 1967. Brandt expressed his concern that the treaty which became Treaty on the Non-Proliferation of Nuclear Weapons (NPT) would harm West Germany's pursuit of atomic energy for peaceful purposes.

Johnson visited West Germany for the first and only time as president from April 23–26, 1967. The visit was primarily to attend the funeral of Konrad Adenauer who died on April 19. On the twenty-sixth he had a direct conversation with Chancellor Kurt Georg Kiesinger in Bonn.

Chancellor Kiesinger made his first official visit to the United States from August 13–19, 1967, meeting with Johnson and administration officials.

=== Nixon administration ===
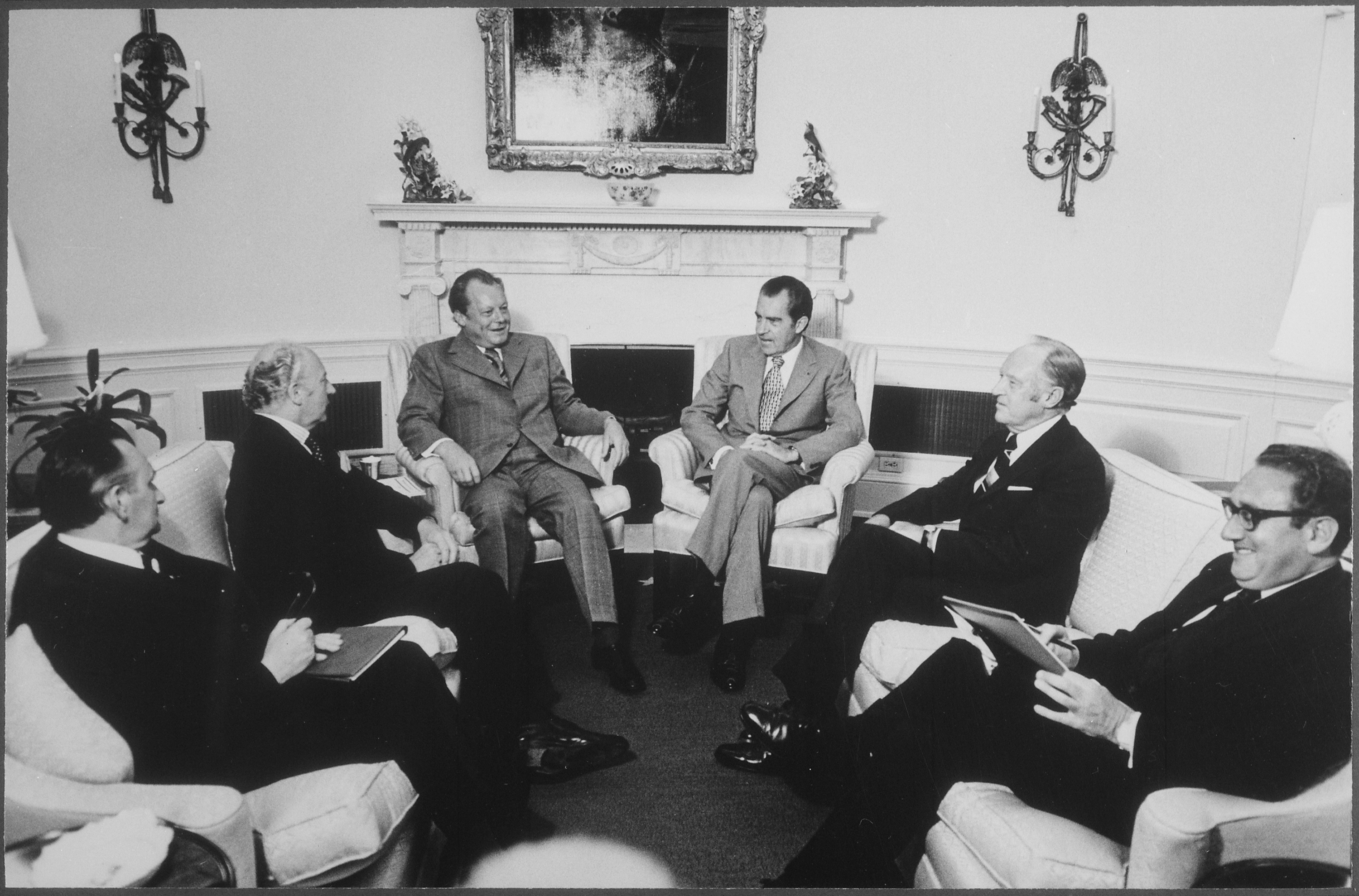
Brandt with Nixon in the Oval Office during the former's visit on May 2, 1973.

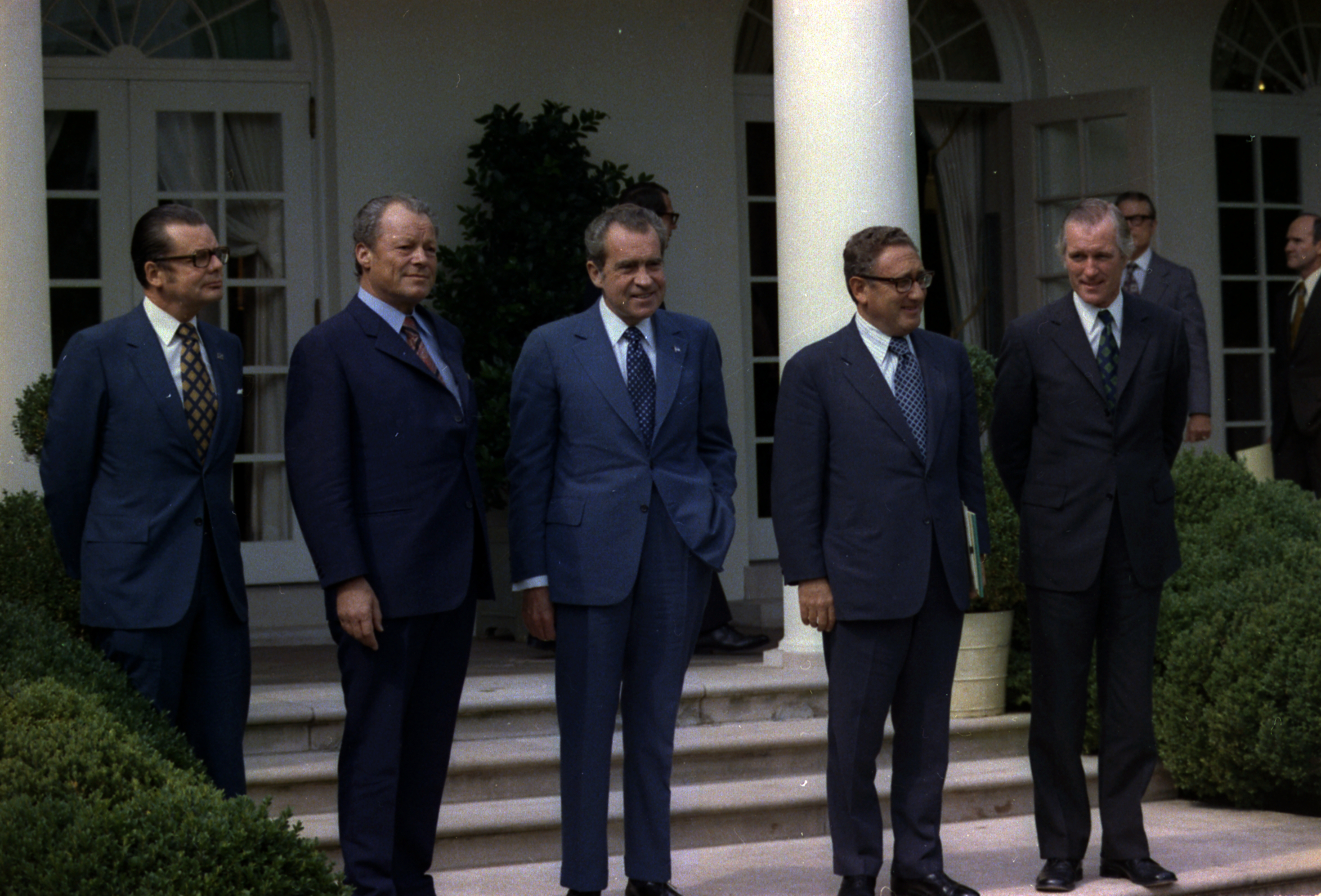
From left to right: Berndt von Staden, Willy Brandt, Richard Nixon, Henry Kissinger, Günther van Well on September 29, 1973.

On July 24, 1963, Richard Nixon, who at the time was the former Vice President of the United States, visited both East and West Germany, East Berlin, and met with Chancellor Adenauer. On March 13, 1967, Nixon met with Adenauer seeking his advice. Adenauer was ninety-one years old. Nixon remarked, "I attach great importance to Dr. Adenauer’s judgments, and I am delighted to have the opportunity to hear Dr. Adenauer's thoughts on different questions and problems." Adenauer told Nixon, "The Soviet Union is the biggest state on Earth and undergoing huge developments. The period of the European great powers has come to an end, once and for all." Adenauer said that the Soviet leadership had repeatedly told him that Russia and Germany should combine their respective power. "Behind this thought lies the fact that the Soviet Union cannot cope with the United States and China by itself." Warning Nixon about "sitting next to an armed robber in the same boat" meaning that the United States should be careful about signing treaties with the Kremlin. And stressed that Washington should gravitate toward Beijing in the hope of "counterbalancing" the Soviet Union.

After winning the 1968 United States presidential election, Nixon made his first and only visit to West Germany as president from February 26–27, 1969. Arriving at Tempelhof Airport, he was greeted by Chancellor Kiesinger for a press conference at the tarmac. At six p.m. he addressed the German Parliament. On the twenty-seventh at one p.m., Nixon spoke at a Siemens factory in West Berlin. Nixon also visited the Berlin Wall from the western portion of the city.

From March 31–April 1, 1969, Kiesinger visited the U.S. to attend the funeral of Eisenhower and met with Nixon on April 1. Kiesinger returned to the U.S. for an official visit from August 7–9, 1969. However, Kiesinger arrived in New York City on August 5. He met Nixon from the 7–9 with a state dinner on August 7 at the White House. On August 8, a dinner was held at German embassy with Kiesinger hosting Vice President Spiro Agnew and Second Lady Judy Agnew. Nixon and Kiesinger discussed West Germany's fears over the Soviet Union's then Brezhnev Doctrine to deter U.S. efforts to establish better relations with countries in the Soviet Bloc in Eastern Europe, the administration's then upcoming Strategic Arms Limitation Talks (SALT) with the Soviets, and possible isolationism seeking to disengage in Europe. Both leaders agreed that a unilateral U.S. troop withdrawal would be a mistake before SALT talks took place. Nixon vowed to Kiesinger, "We proudly stand with you as friends and allies." Nixon and Kiesinger agreed to set up a Bonn-Washington hotline similar to the Moscow–Washington hotline.

From April 4–11, 1970, the newly elected Chancellor Willy Brandt visited the U.S. first arriving in El Paso, Texas where he received a welcome letter from Nixon. Brandt was welcomed to the White House on April 10 with a welcome ceremony and stayed until the 11th. On April 11, Brandt and his delegation visited Kennedy Space Center for the launch of Apollo 13. Both Brandt and Nixon had similar policies on how to engage with the Soviet and Communist bloc. Nixon had Détente and Brandt had Ostpolitik. While similar in their peaceful engagement through verbal communication, Ostpolitik was mainly West Germany normalizing relations with East Germany, resolving the division of Germany, and fostering closer ties with Communist Eastern Europe. Ostpolitik worried some American foreign policy experts who felt it legitimized the communist bloc and weakened the West. However, the Nixon administration supported West Germany's efforts to ease tensions with East Germany.

Brandt returned to America from June 14–16, 1971, meeting with Nixon from 15–16 on West Berlin's status and potential opening a path for talks between NATO and the Warsaw Pact on reducing military forces in Europe. On November 28, it was confirmed that both men would meet each other at Key Biscayne, Florida from December 28–29 at Nixon's Florida White House. During their two day visit, Nixon assured Brandt that he would not make any separate deals with the Soviet Union on troop withdrawals from Europe when he was due to visit Moscow in May of 1972. Brandt would later stay in Florida on vacation in Sarasota, Florida and Longboat Key, Florida until January 13.

Brandt would return to visit the U.S. from May 1–2, 1973, meeting with Nixon in Washington. The first interaction between leaders from both countries in nearly two years. Brandt announced his visit on April 4 following a formal invitation sent on March 5. Brandt's visit came ten days before Leonid Brezhnev's to West Germany. However, Brandt was less enthusiastic about this visit than his previous visits after learning that Nixon had invited other Western European leaders to visit before Brandt. Brandt reportedly said, "Is this the way he wants to talk to Europe? Why doesn't Nixon come here? Why should we all line up to kiss the doormat?" Reports indicated that Brandt wanted certain exclusivity with calls from the White House during spring. Brandt arrived in the U.S. on April 29 leaving on May 3.

The last visit and interaction between Nixon and Brandt occurred on September 29, 1973. Brandt arrived on September 23 and on the 26th he addressed the United Nations General Assembly and would meet Nixon on the 29th in Washington.

Following Willy Brandt's resignation due to the Guillaume affair in 1974, Helmut Schmidt succeeded Brandt as Chancellor. Schmidt and Nixon would meet for the only time on June 26, 1974 during the 1974 Brussels NATO summit.

=== Ford administration ===
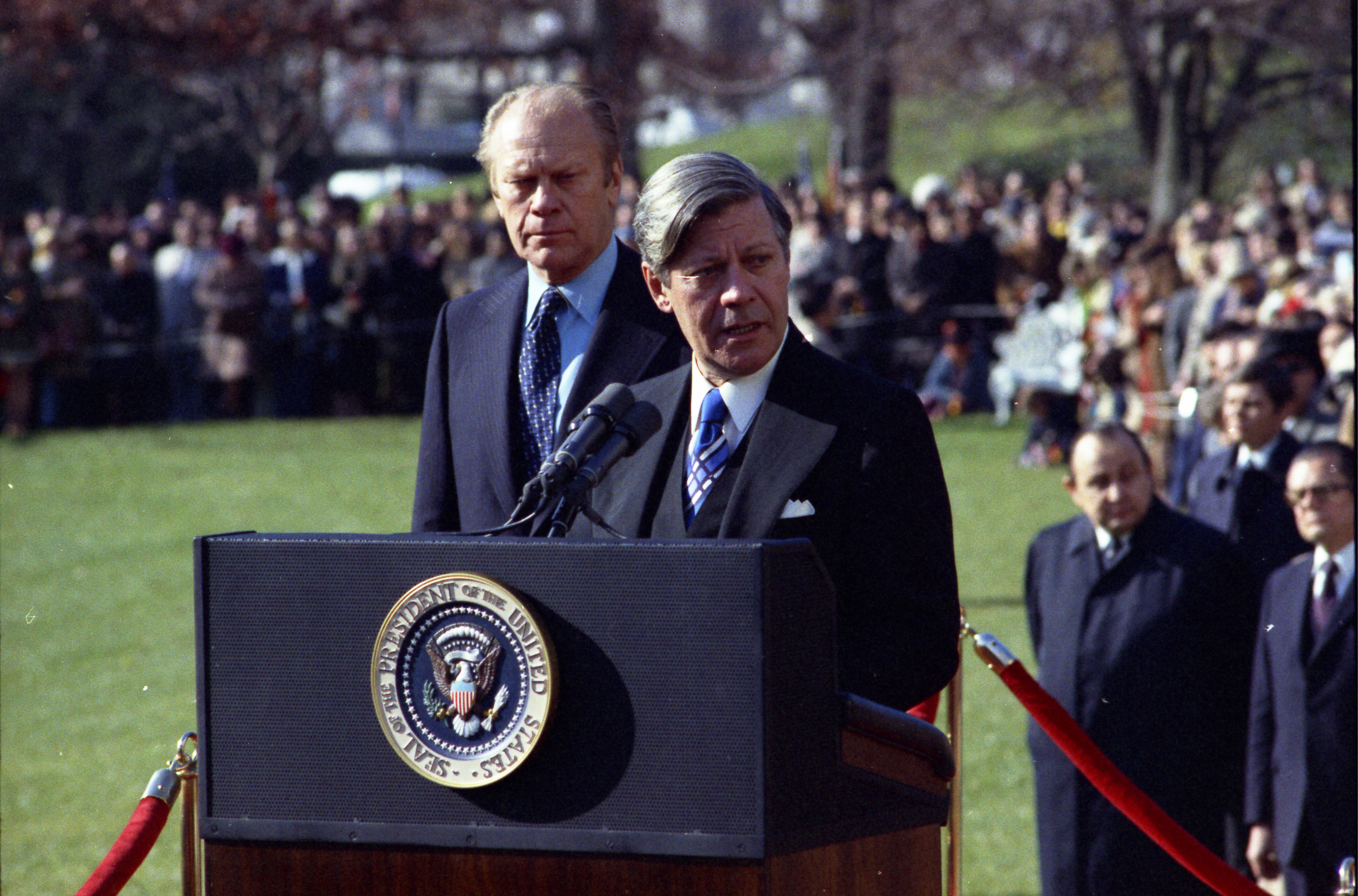
Gerald Ford listens to Helmut Schmidt during the arrival ceremony for Schmidt at the White House on December 5, 1974.

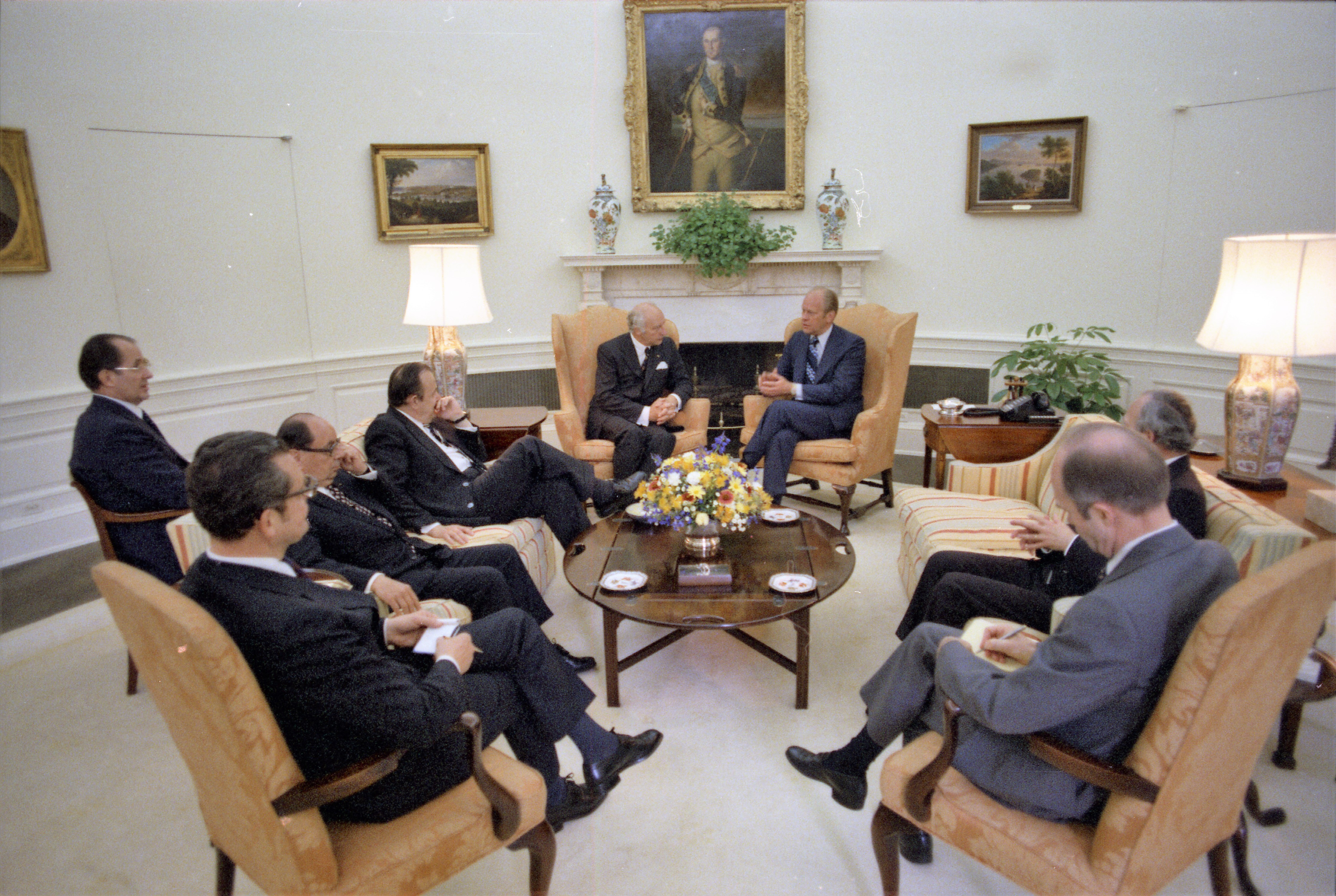
Ford and Scheel in the Oval Office on June 16, 1975 during the latter's visit to the U.S.

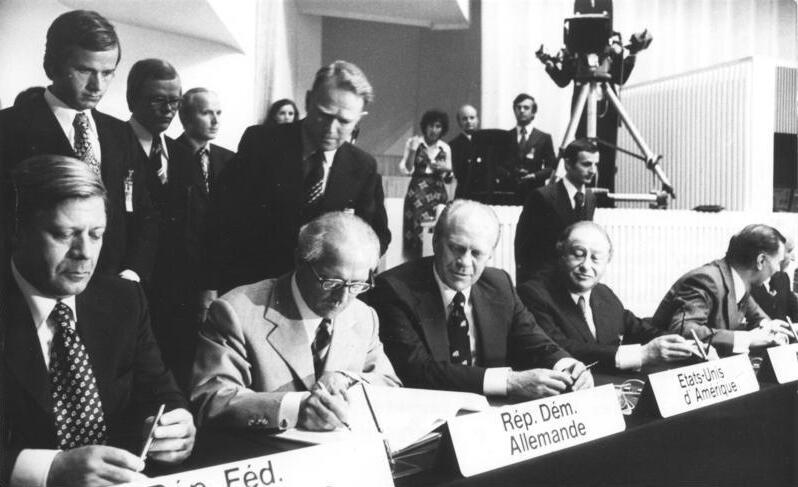
Chancellor of Federal Republic of Germany (West Germany) Helmut Schmidt, Chairman of the State Council of the German Democratic Republic (East Germany) Erich Honecker, US President Gerald Ford and Austrian chancellor Bruno Kreisky on August 1, 1975, signing the Helsinki Accords.

Gerald Ford became President of the United States following the resignation of Richard Nixon due to the Watergate scandal in 1974, similar to Helmut Schmidt's accession as head of government following his predecessor's resignation due to scandal. Ford and Schmidt met each other for the first time during the latter's state visit to the U.S. from December 4-6, 1974. Schmidt arrived on December 4 with a formal visit to the White House on the 5th for formal talks on the 5th and 6th. The primary focus was the energy crisis where both leaders agreed to bring France to help put an end to the crisis. Schmidt spoke with French President Valéry Giscard d'Estaing prior to his arrival and was trying to bring France and U.S. together over their approach and dispute to resolve the crisis as France was trying to go it alone by talking directly to the oil-producing countries. Ford later in the evening unexpectedly joined Schmidt at a meeting of American and German experts on international economic problems at the Blair House and took part in the final forty minutes of the conference.

From May 29–30, 1975, Ford and Schmidt would meet again during the 1975 Brussels NATO summit, where on the twenty-ninth the two had a luncheon at the American embassy.

From June 16–18, FDR President Walter Scheel visited the U.S. on a state visit and was hosted by President Ford at the White House. A state dinner was held on June 16.

From July 26–28, Ford visited West Germany traveling to Bonn and Linz am Rhein and meeting with both President Scheel and Chancellor Schmidt. The visit was the first of a five-nation European tour and in anticipation of the signing of the Helsinki Accords during the third summit of the Conference on Security and Co-operation in Europe. The conference took place from July 29–August 2, 1975 where Ford and Schmidt signed the accord along with East German president Erich Honecker and Soviet leader Leonid Brezhnev on August 1.

On October 3, Schmidt briefly visited the White House with talks with Ford in the afternoon with Ford hosting a luncheon.

Ford and Schmidt would meet again from November 15–17 as part of the 1st G6 summit.

From June 26–28, 1976, the United States would host the first G7 summit in Dorado, Puerto Rico with Schmidt among the attending world leaders.

From July 14–20, Schmidt visited the U.S. on an official visit. Arriving on July 14, he was hosted by Ford at the White House on the fifteenth for a state dinner later in the evening. Schmidt visited Colonial Williamsburg in Williamsburg, Virginia, Baltimore, and Philadelphia with a private visit to San Francisco.

=== Carter administration ===
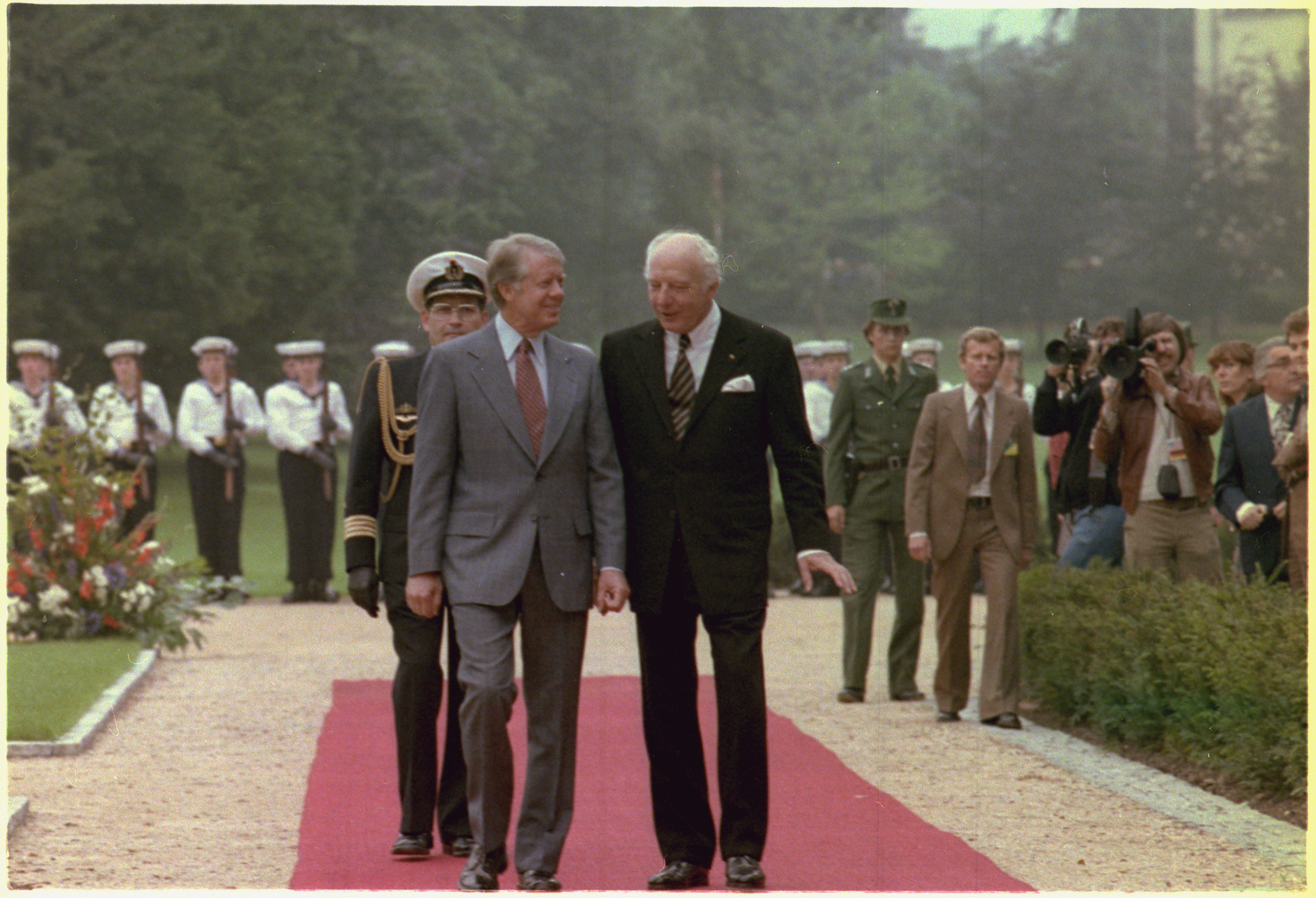
Jimmy Carter welcomed by Walter Scheel on July 14, 1978, in Bonn during Carter's state visit.

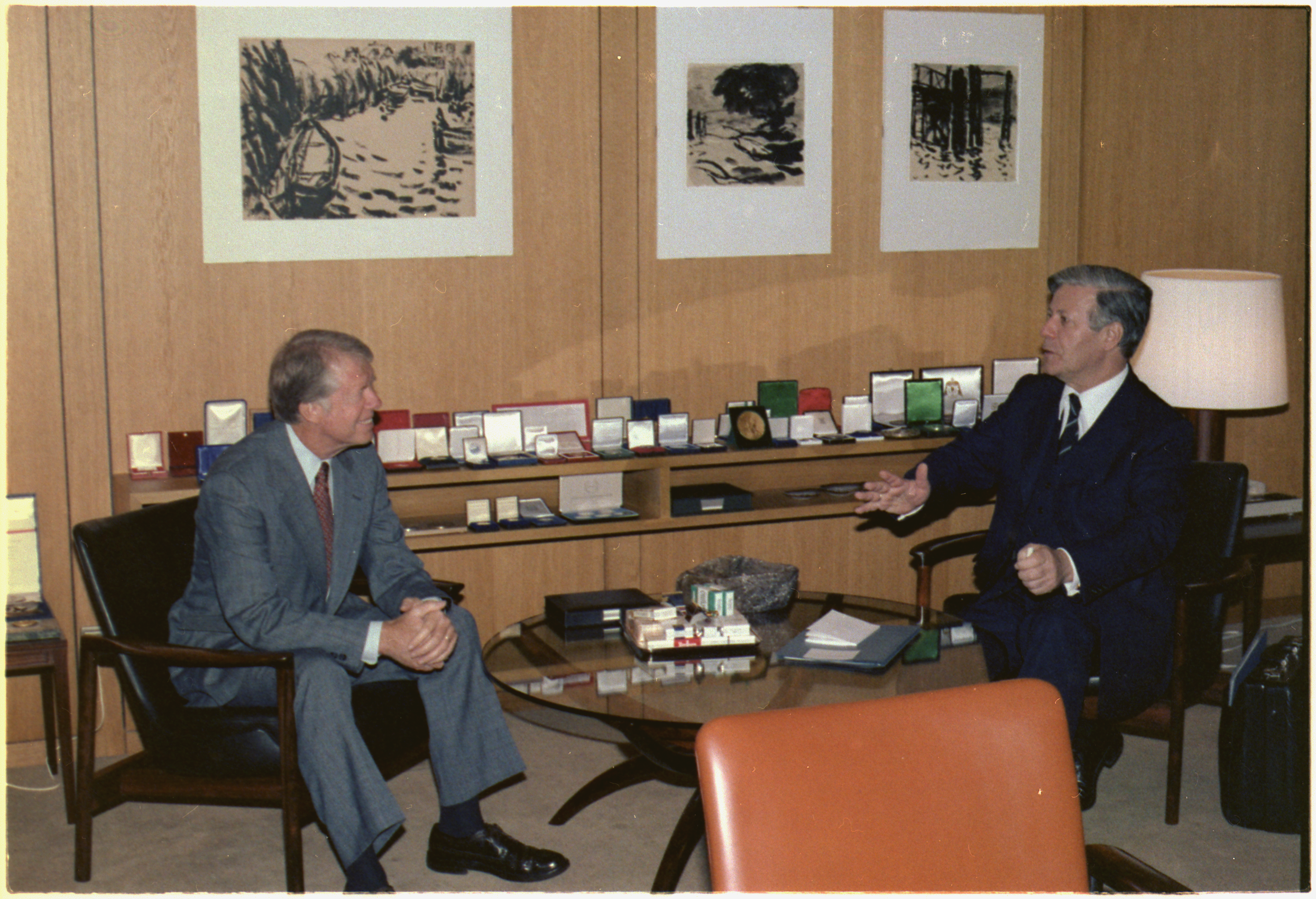
Carter and Helmut Schmidt speaking at Palais Schaumburg during Carter's state visit on July 14, 1978

From May 7–11, 1977, Jimmy Carter and Schmidt would meet each other for the first time in London during the 3rd G7 summit and 1977 London NATO summit. A point of contention between the two leaders was nuclear proliferation. Carter objected to Schmidt approving exports of nuclear technology valued at more than $10 billion to Brazil. Carter was opposed to nuclear proliferation and promoted arms control. Carter and Schmidt never really got along being one of the most famous contentious relationship between two western leaders. The source of the tensions date back to the 1976 United States presidential election where Schmidt had openly talked to Newsweek about his great rapport with and appreciation for Gerald Ford, Carter's opponent and eventual predecessor, in October weeks before the election. Schmidt stated, "I have to abstain from any interference in your campaign," he stressed, "but I really like your President, and I think he has done quite a bit of help in these past two years. I have been taking advice from him. This has been a two-way affair. But on the other hand, I am not going to say anything about Mr. Carter, neither positive nor negative, I have met him for one hour only." The headline that was published was "I like Ford". Schmidt's office sent apologies to Carter's campaign pinning the faux pas on an interview given very early in the morning when the chancellor wasn’t particularly careful about his words. Similar concerns were also felt by British Prime Minister James Callaghan who expressed to Schmidt in May 1976 about his "uncertainty" about how America would cope in superpower relations if "a very much unknown farmer governor" took over the White House.

Schmidt viewed Carter's human rights-based foreign policy as a grave danger to the efforts of détente and rapprochement between the Cold War blocs that had been achieved years prior. He assessed Carter as a "moralist" who was not up for the job of president. Carter thought that Schmidt was "volatile" and seemed to believe he knew more about other countries than their elected leaders. Further differences continued in regards to economic policies to confront the economic downturn of the 1970s and negotiations over arms control with the Soviets. Schmidt was appalled that Carter tore up the Ford-Brezhnev agreements at Vladivostok, pressing instead for "deep cuts". The Soviets flatly rejected it in March 1977 forcing both side to start negotiations once again from scratch.

On July 13–15, 1977, Schmidt visited the U.S. continuing from their discussions during the G7 and London summits. Contention continued between them as Schmidt wanted assurances that the focus on human rights would not jeopardize détente efforts in Central Europe. Both parties agreed on an initiative to reduce conventional forces in Central Europe as part of Mutual and Balanced Force Reductions between NATO and the Warsaw Pact. Schmidt was hosted at the White House with a state dinner on July 13.

Schmidt returned to visit the U.S. as it hosted the 1978 Washington NATO summit from May 30–31. Schmidt and Carter had a one-hour working breakfast at the White House prior to the start of the summit. Carter and Schmidt also reviewed planning for the 4th G7 summit in Bonn from July 16–17.

From July 14–17, Carter visited West Germany on a state visit and for the 4th G7 summit. The visit was reported to make officials in West Germany and West Berlin "a little bit nervous" over plans by Carter to host a town meeting in West Berlin with about 1,000 residents. Carter was welcomed by President Scheel and addressed American and German military personnel at Wiesbaden‐Erbenheim air base. Carter visited Frankfurt after arriving in Bonn and addressed a crowd of several thousand people in front of the town hall. About two hundred members of the West German Communist Party tried to protest the visit. However, police rounded them up and released them until after Carter left.

Carter would speak at the Berlin Airlift Memorial and held a town hall with the residents of West Berlin at Haus der Kulturen der Welt. It was the first town hall meeting held by a U.S. President abroad. The format was part of Carter's 1976 presidential campaign and had used five times during his presidency at this point. East Germans slowed traffic on highways into the western half of the city in an apparent protest against Schmidt and FDR Foreign Minister Hans-Dietrich Genscher attending with Carter. East Germans had sent a note protesting the presence of the two West German leader stating that they had no business in the city with Carter. Bonn rejected the East German protest and sent a sharp protest against the traffic disruption. During his address, Carter uttered "Was immer sei, Berlin bleibt frei," or "Whatever may be, Berlin stays free" which received applause. A phrase he stated during his visit to the Berlin airlift memorial. Carter had also denounced the Berlin Wall. Questions from the residents were described as softer than the ones Carter received at home since taking office. The questions mostly dealt with Berlin's status and the 1971 Four Power Agreement on Berlin that eased restrictions on the two cities. The West German Communist Party staged a demonstration while President Carter was speaking after their failed attempt in Frankfurt.

West German authorities were faintly annoyed at the insistence that Carter fly on Air Force One. Americans declined, however, insisting that the President had to stay close to the special communications facilities aboard Air Force One that keep him in constant contact with Washington. Unlike other state guests like Soviet leader Leonid Brezhnev, who visited FDR earlier in the year flew in a special West German aircraft.

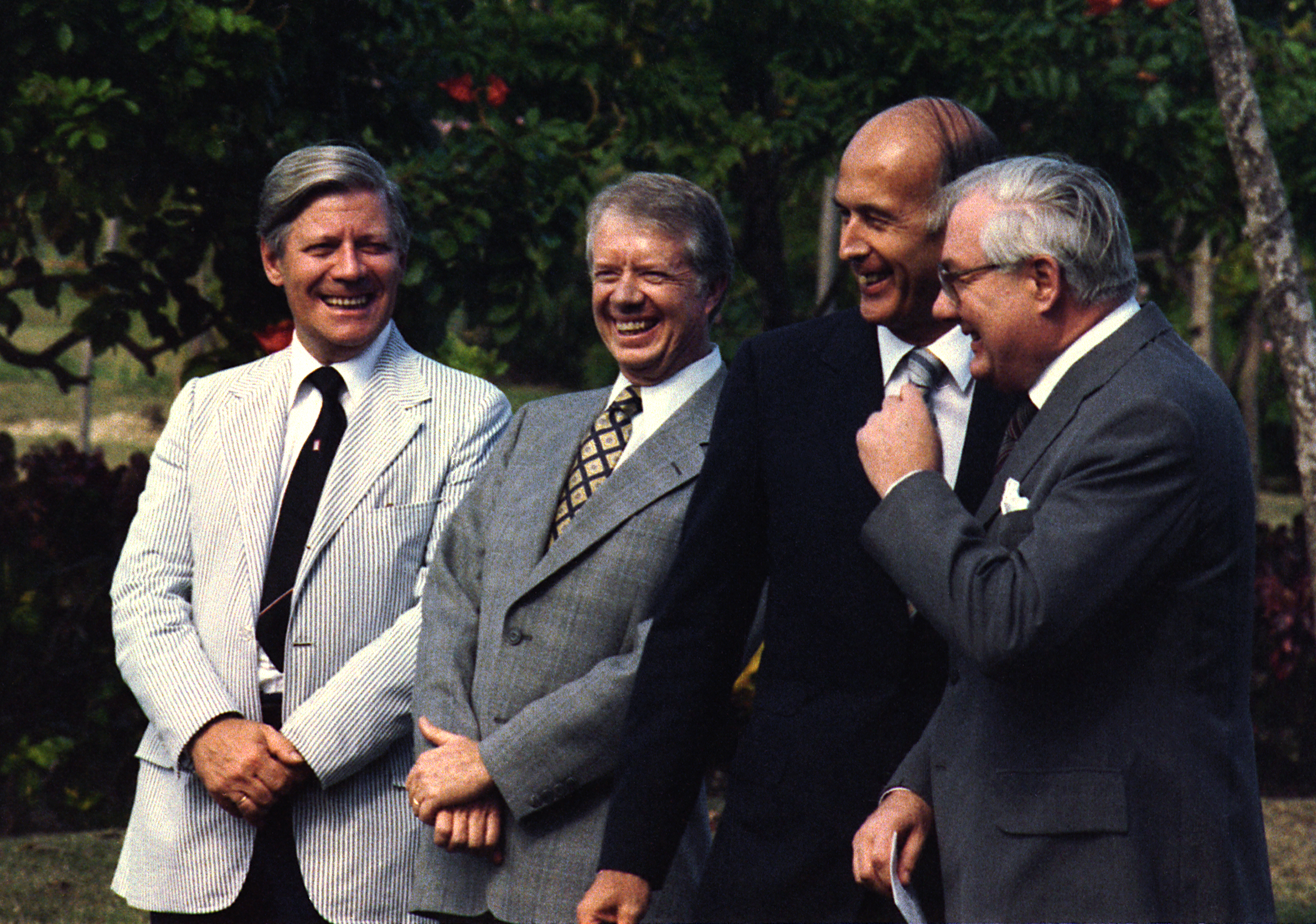
Helmut Schmidt, Jimmy Carter, Valéry Giscard d'Estaing, and James Callaghan in Guadeloupe

From January 4–7, 1979, Carter and Schmidt would meet during the Guadeloupe Conference in Guadeloupe along with their British and French counterparts, Valéry Giscard d'Estaing, and James Callaghan on discussions over the Middle East, the Iranian political crisis which resulted in the Iranian Revolution, the Cambodian–Vietnamese War, violence in South Africa, the increasing influence of the Soviet Union in the Persian Gulf, the Saur Revolution in Afghanistan, and the Political violence in Turkey.

From June 6–8, Schmidt visited the U.S. on a private visit. On June 6, he met with President Carter at the White House. Schmidt visited Cambridge, Columbia, South Carolina, and New York City. On June 7, Schmidt spoke at the commencement ceremony of Harvard University expressing his support for the SALT II Treaty which the United States and the Soviet Union signed on June 18.

From March 4–6, 1980, Schmidt returned to the U.S. for talks with Carter for talks on the Soviet Invasion of Afghanistan. One of Schmidt's closest associates described the meeting as the most sensitive and important German-American conversation in the six years since Schmidt had been in office. The visit was also crucial in terms of West German politics as elections for parliament that were held in October as Schmidt needed confidence from the U.S. to have an advantage over his opponent, Franz Josef Strauss. Strauss himself would meet Carter the following week on March 13.

Schmidt said West Germany was willing to start possible export restrictions on strategic goods for the Soviet Union if other Western allies did the same. Possible efforts in response to the invasion were some contracts and policy of offering guarantees on private loans given to firms exporting to the Soviet Union could be discussed but West Germany wanted to continue trade with the Soviet Union. Since most contracts were long-term, it would've been difficult to end them and then reestablish them if the situation improved. Trade between West Germany and Soviet Union was viewed as vital by the U.S. to stabilizing relations between the two countries.

Another concern was the Olympic boycott led by the U.S. which West Germany participated in. A view of Schmidt was that he might be pushed to commit West Germany to participate in an alternative Olympics in the United States if the Soviet's did not withdraw from Afghanistan, but viewed the boycott as unnecessarily provocative, and alternative games would only prolong the confrontation.

At the 6th G7 summit from June 22–23, tensions between the two leaders would escalate. Schmidt confronted Carter over a letter that Carter had sent him before the summit, which Schmidt found insulting. Schmidt reminded the president that Germany was not the 51st state of the U.S. and even got into a heated exchange with National Security Adviser Zbigniew Brzezinski. Schmidt insisted on sticking to his planned visit to the Kremlin in July. Carter's anger with what he considered to be Schmidt's double-dealing was expressed in the letter that the White House then leaked to the press. Schmidt incensed that he went over the whole history of their relationship. At one point he even exclaimed "Well, I don't mind a fight", to which Brzezinski retorted, "if a fight is necessary I am quite prepared not to shrink from a fight." According to Carter's memoirs, German foreign minister Hans-Dietrich Genscher later thanked the president for handling the difficult situation. Carter described it as "The most unpleasant personal exchange I ever had with a foreign leader."

From November 18–21, Schmidt visited the U.S. again on a private visit meeting with Carter and with President-elect Ronald Reagan who defeated Carter in the 1980 United States presidential election on November 20. Reagan and his wife, Nancy Reagan, were invited by Cater to the White House as part of Reagan's transition and visited on the twentieth. The victory of Reagan in itself was welcomed by Schmidt and Valéry Giscard d'Estaing who both stated that it strengthened the United States. Schmidt stated, "We Germans are also interested in a strong American administration and a strong America."

This was the last time Carter and Schmidt would meet ending what was a very tumultuous relationship. Carter confided in his diary that he was "glad to deliver Schmidt" to Reagan.

=== Reagan administration ===
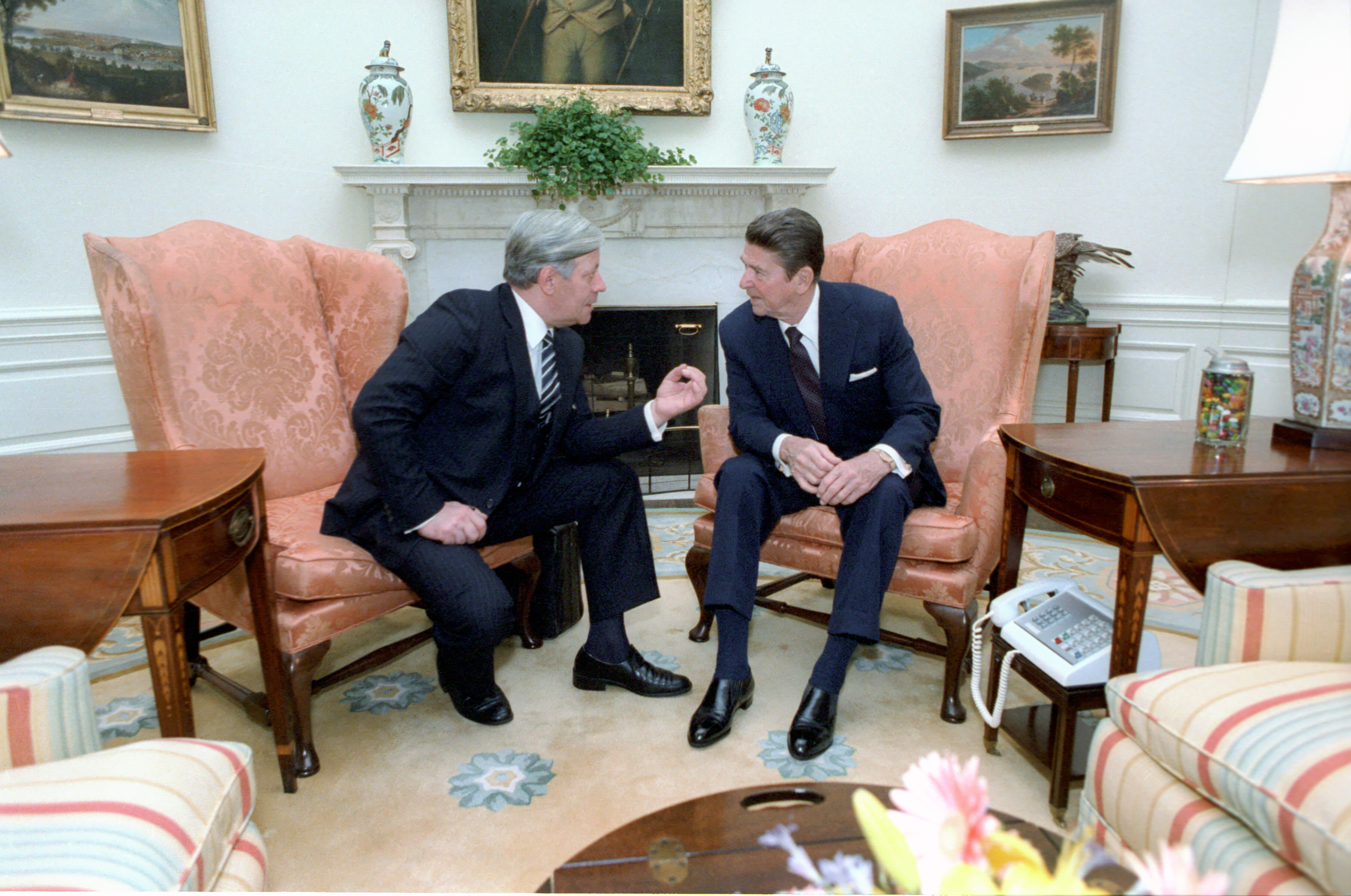
Helmut Schmidt and Ronald Reagan in the Oval Office on May 21, 1981.

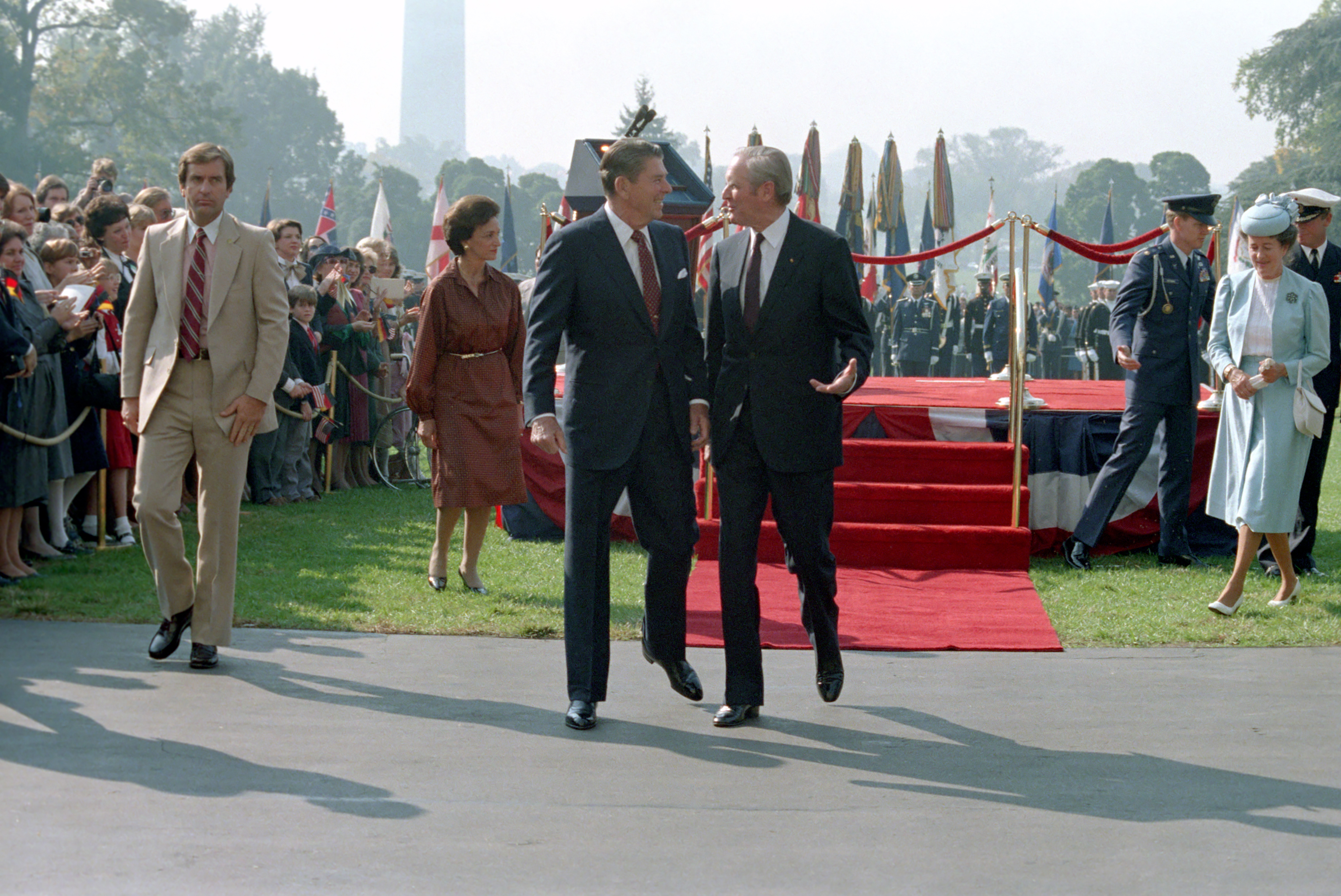
Ronald Reagan with Karl Carstens on the South Lawn for Carstens state visit, October 4, 1983.

From May 20–23, 1981, Reagan hosted a state visit for Helmut Schmidt at the White House. The talks between both leaders represented a sharp contrast from Carter and Schmidt. Schmidt praised Reagan as the talks were described as deeply satisfying, where Schmidt described the United States as "the most important nation in the world, the greatest nation."

From January 4–6, 1982, Schmidt visited the U.S. for a private visit and met with Reagan on January 5 as they both discussed the imposition of martial law in Poland.

Reagan would make his first visit to West Germany from June 9–11 as part of his attendance for the 1982 Bonn NATO summit. On the ninth, he addressed the Bundestag, with the summit held on the tenth. On the eleventh, Reagan visited West Berlin with Nancy Reagan. They visited Checkpoint Charlie and viewed the Berlin Wall. Reagan gave a speech at Schloss Charlottenburg to a crowd of about 20,000 people, where he declared, "We in America and in the West are still Berliners, too, and always will be". He also rhetorically asked, "Why is that wall there? Why are they so afraid of freedom on this side of the wall?" During the visit, protests occurred in opposition or Reagan's policy of military buildup by peace activists. On June 10, an estimated 300,000 to 400,000 people gathered in the Bonn Hofgarten, marking one of the largest peace demonstrations in West German history. During the visit to West Berlin, violent clashes broke out in Schöneberg, Charlottenburg, and Nollendorfplatz as Reagan arrived in the morning. Roughly 2,000–3,000 protesters clashed with over 10,000 police officers. Head of the Hamburg Interior Department Alfons Pawelczyk had warned about sympathizers with far left groups such as Red Army Faction as being behind attempts to cause chaos during the visit.

From July 20–27, Schmidt attended Bohemian Grove with Secretary of State George Shultz.

Helmut Kohl became Chancellor of the FDR following Helmut Schmidt's defeat in a constructive vote of no confidence on October 1. Kohl visited the U.S. for a formal state visit from November 14–16. The first of twenty-one working and official visits to the country. On November 16 in New York, Kohl expressed support for a summit between Reagan and new Soviet leader Yuri Andropov who took over after Leonid Brezhnev died earlier in the week on November 10.

Kohl would return two more times to the U.S. in 1983. The first was from April 14–15. And the second was from May 28–31 for the 9th G7 summit in Williamsburg, Virginia.

From October 3–6, West Germany President Karl Carstens made a state visit to commemorate the tricentennial of the first German immigration to America in 1683 of Mennonite families in Germantown, Philadelphia. The commemoration was largely the task of the German-American Tricentennial Commission created by the United States Congress and was passed into law by Reagan on January 14.

On the fourth, a ceremony was held for Carstens at the White House with a state dinner in his honor. On the fifth, Carstens addressed a joint session of the United States Congress. Carstens would visit Philadelphia, St. Louis, El Paso, Texas, Dallas, the Grand Canyon, Las Vegas, Seattle, Madison, Wisconsin, New York City, and New Haven, Connecticut at Yale University where Karstens studied law after World War II before departing on October 14.

Kohl would later return to the U.S. in 1984 for two more working visits. The first from March 3–6. And the second from November 29–30.

==== Bitburg controversy ====
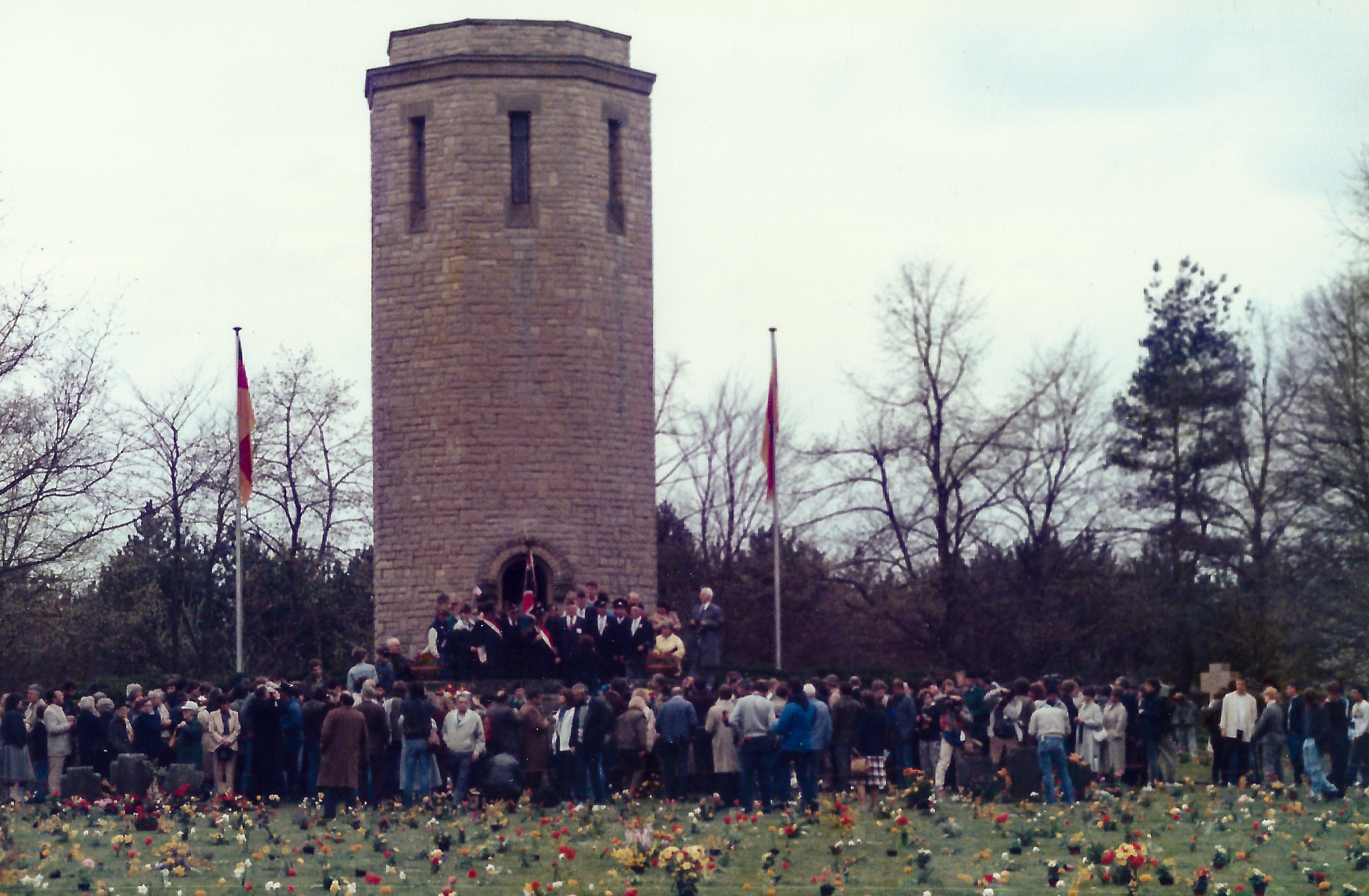
The cemetery after the ceremony

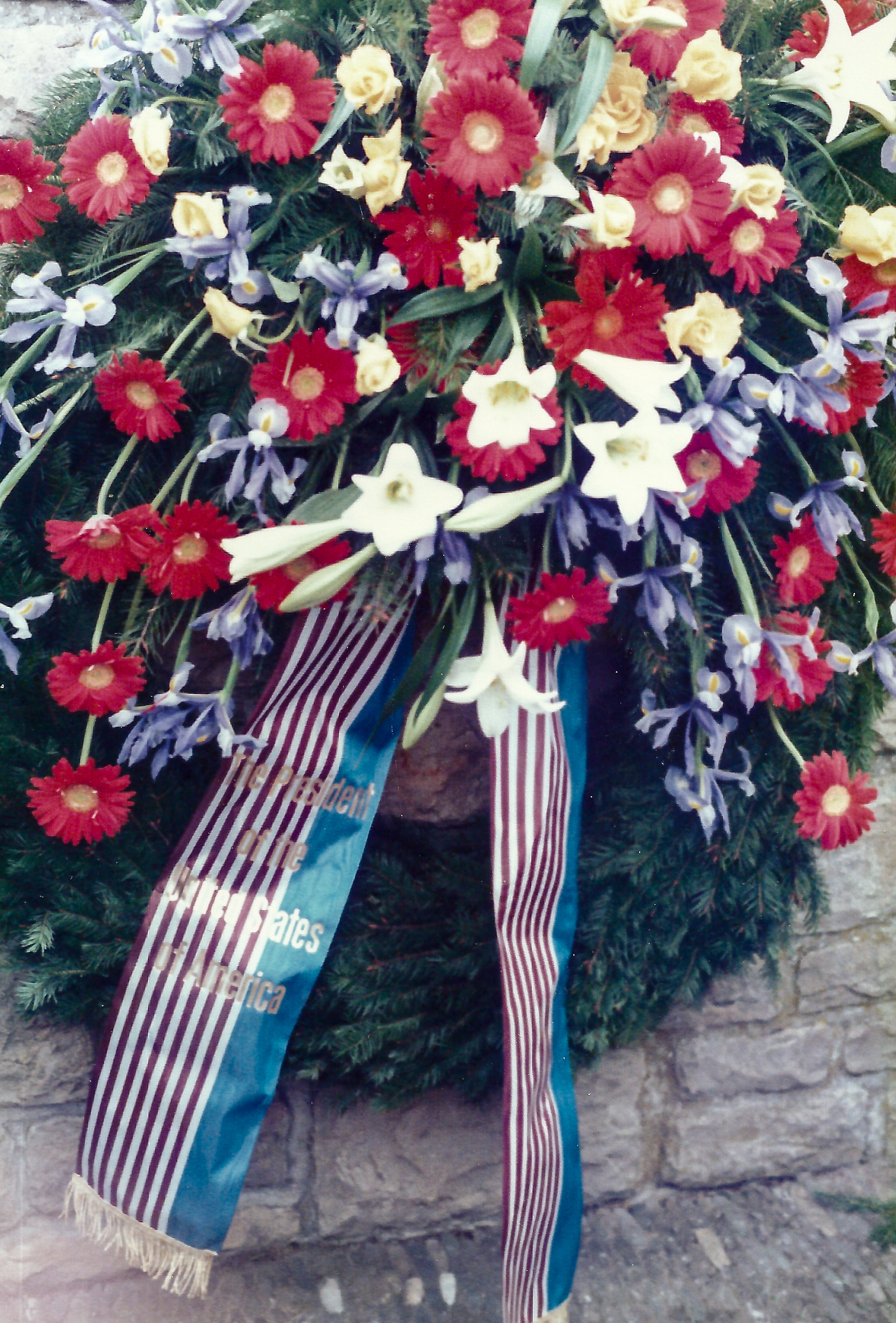
President Reagan's wreath

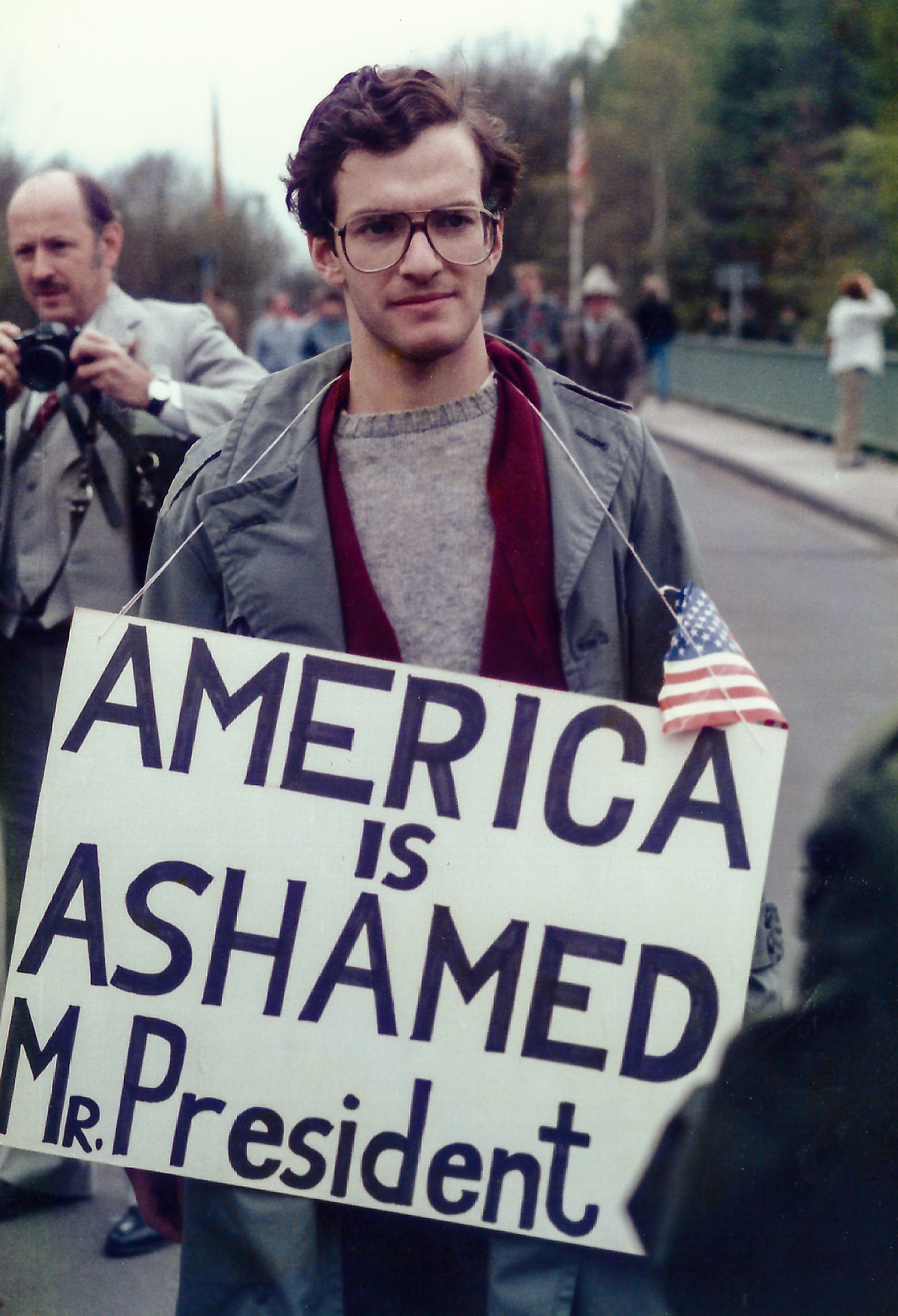
Protester with sign

From April 30–May 6, 1985, Ronald Reagan paid a second state visit to West Germany as part of his attendance of the 11th G7 summit in Bonn which took place from May 2–4. Reagan also visited the Bergen-Belsen concentration camp, Bitburg, and Hambach Castle as part of ceremonies commemorating the 40th anniversary of the end of World War II in Europe. The visit, however, was largely overshadowed by the Bitburg controversy. Reagan visited a military cemetery in Bitburg. The visit was intended to commemorate the 40th anniversary of the end of World War II in Europe, but aroused considerable criticism from Jewish communities within the United States and around the world when it became known that 49 of the 2,000 German soldiers buried at the site had been members of the Waffen-SS, the military arm of Nazi Germany's Schutzstaffel (SS). The entire SS had been judged to be a criminal organization at the Nuremberg trials. Although not part of the original itinerary, as part of their own reconciliatory gesture, Reagan and Chancellor Helmut Kohl made an impromptu visit to the Bergen-Belsen concentration camp before visiting Bitburg, thus reducing the time Reagan had to spend at Kolmeshöhe Military Cemetery to only eight minutes.

During Kohl's November 1984 visit to the U.S., Kohl appealed to Reagan to join him in symbolizing the reconciliation of their two countries at a German military cemetery. It was suggested that the Kolmeshöhe Cemetery, near Bitburg, was both suitably close and relevant, as 11,000 Americans attached to a nearby airbase lived in harmony with the same number of Germans. Reagan agreed, and later told an aide he felt he owed Kohl, who despite considerable public and political opposition had stood steadfast with Reagan on the deployment of Pershing II missiles in West Germany. In February 1985, then White House Deputy Chief of Staff Michael Deaver made a planning visit to Bitburg. At the Kolmeshöhe Cemetery, the 32 rows of headstones were covered with snow. Deaver and his team failed to notice that among them were 49 members of the Waffen-SS. A decision was made by the Reagan team not to include a visit to a Nazi concentration camps, as had been previously suggested by Kohl. The President said he did not want to risk "reawakening the passions of the time" or offend his hosts by visiting a concentration camp.

On April 11, 1985, White House Press Secretary Larry Speakes informed the media of the planned visit to Bitburg. When asked who was buried at Kolmeshöhe, Speakes said he thought both American and German soldiers were there. Reporters soon discovered that no American servicemen were in the cemetery (in fact, the remains of all U.S. soldiers had long since been removed from German soil) and that Waffen-SS graves were located close to the proposed ceremony.

Criticisms came from Jewish groups and military veterans. Elie Wiesel, holocaust survivor and then-chairman of the United States Holocaust Memorial Council stated, "A visit to this particular cemetery is to us unacceptable. This is not just a cemetery of soldiers. This is tombstones of the SS, which is beyond what we can imagine. These are and were criminals." Wiesel said the council had sent a telegram requesting a meeting between himself and Reagan. When questioned, Bitburg Mayor Theo Hallet stated that all German military cemeteries were likely to contain some SS graves. Decorations and memorials on the Waffen-SS graves were removed just prior to Reagan's visit.

Kohl responded in an interview with Time: "I will not give up the idea. If we don't go to Bitburg, if we don't do what we jointly planned, we will deeply offend the feelings of [my] people." A poll revealed that 72% of West Germans thought the visit should go forward as planned. Kohl admitted that rarely had German-American relations been so strained, and in the days leading up to the visit, the White House and the Chancellery were each blaming the other. The White House claimed that the Germans had given assurances that nothing in the Bitburg visit would be an "embarrassment" for the President: "As clumsily as we handled it, Kohl and his Co. have surpassed us in spades." A German official said, "The Americans also have a responsibility toward the president. They must also check on the history that is beneath their ground. It was not very intelligent. At the age of 15, only 18 days before Germany surrendered, I was asked if I wanted to join the SS. I could refuse because of my age. But they hanged a boy from a tree who was perhaps only two years older with a sign saying TRAITOR because he had run away. I can still see it now."

Reagan defended himself stating "These [SS troops] were the villains, as we know, that conducted the persecutions and all. But there are 2,000 graves there, and most of those, the average age is about 18. I think that there's nothing wrong with visiting that cemetery where those young men are victims of Nazism also, even though they were fighting in the German uniform, drafted into service to carry out the hateful wishes of the Nazis. They were victims, just as surely as the victims in the Nazi concentration camps." The controversy even promoted several resolutions to be introduced in the United States House of Representatives urging Reagan not to go to the cemetery. Later, 53 senators urged him in a letter to omit the ceremony. On April 27, 82 United States Senators voted to pass a resolution in a voice vote urging Reagan to cancel the visit to the cemetery.

Reagan was criticized for this statement by opponents of the visit. Equating Nazi soldiers with Holocaust victims, responded Rabbi Alexander M. Schindler, president of the Union of American Hebrew Congregations, was "a callous offence for the Jewish people". Some believed Communications Director Pat Buchanan had written the statement, which he denied in 1999. Buchanan also became part of the center of the controversy. NBC reported that Buchanan could be seen repeatedly writing the phrase "succumbing to the pressure of the Jews" during a meeting of officials over planning of the visit.

Kohl made a call to the White House days before Reagan's visit to make sure the President was not wavering in the face of criticism, not to mention pressure from Reagan's wife, Nancy Reagan. The Chancellor's aide, Horst Teltschik, later said: "Once we knew about the SS dead at Bitburg – knowing that these SS people were seventeen to eighteen years of age, and knowing that some Germans were forced to become members of the SS, having no alternative – the question was, Should this be a reason to cancel?" Reagan aide Robert McFarlane later said: "Once Reagan learned that Kohl would really be badly damaged by a withdrawal, he said 'We can't do that; I owe him.'" Prior to sending Deaver back to West Germany for the third time, just two days before the scheduled visit, Reagan told Michael Deaver, "I know you and Nancy don't want me to go through with this, but I don't want you to change anything when you get over there, because history will prove I'm right. If we can't reconcile after forty years, we are never going to be able to do it".

Teltschik was the aide of Kohl who was blamed for the fiasco of the visit, but both sides had traded blame.

Reporters soon discovered that no American servicemen were in the cemetery (in fact, the remains of all U.S. soldiers had long since been removed from German soil) and that Waffen-SS graves were located close to the proposed ceremony. Decorations and memorials on the Waffen-SS graves were removed just prior to Reagan's visit.

On May 5, Reagan and Kohl appeared at the Bergen-Belsen concentration camp. Reagan said, "All these children of God, under bleak and lifeless mounds, the plainness of which does not even hint at the unspeakable acts that created them. Here they lie, never to hope, never to pray, never to live, never to heal, never to laugh, never to cry... And then, rising above all this cruelty, out of this tragic and nightmarish time, beyond the anguish, the pain and suffering, and for all time, we can and must pledge: never again."

Reagan spent only eight minutes at the Kolmeshöhe Cemetery along with Kohl, 90-year-old General Matthew Ridgway, who had commanded the 82nd Airborne in World War II and Luftwaffe ace and former head of NATO, General Johannes Steinhoff. After Reagan placed a wreath at the cemetery memorial, they all stood to attention while a short trumpet salute was played. At the end, Steinhoff turned and, in an unscripted act, shook hands with Ridgway. A surprised Kohl later thanked Steinhoff, who said that it seemed to be the right thing to do.

Security was heavy for the five-kilometre (3 mi) route from the NATO airbase at Kolmeshöhe, lined with 2,000 policemen – one posted every 4 metres (12 ft): few protesters showed up. When Reagan arrived at the cemetery, filmmaker Michael Moore and a Jewish friend of his whose parents were at Auschwitz were there with a banner that read "We came from Michigan, USA to remind you: They killed my family".

They were shown live on TV networks across the country. Reagan made one last appearance with Kohl at United States Air Base at Bitburg, before 7,500 spectators waving American and West German flags. Kohl thanked the President for staying the course: "This walk... over the graves of soldiers was not an easy walk. I thank you personally as a friend that you undertook this walk with me". Reagan responded: "This visit has stirred many emotions in the American and German people too. Some old wounds have been reopened, and this I regret very much, because this should be a time of healing".

==== Post-Bitburg and Tear down this wall ====
Complete speech. The passage "tear down this wall" begins at 11:55 into this video.

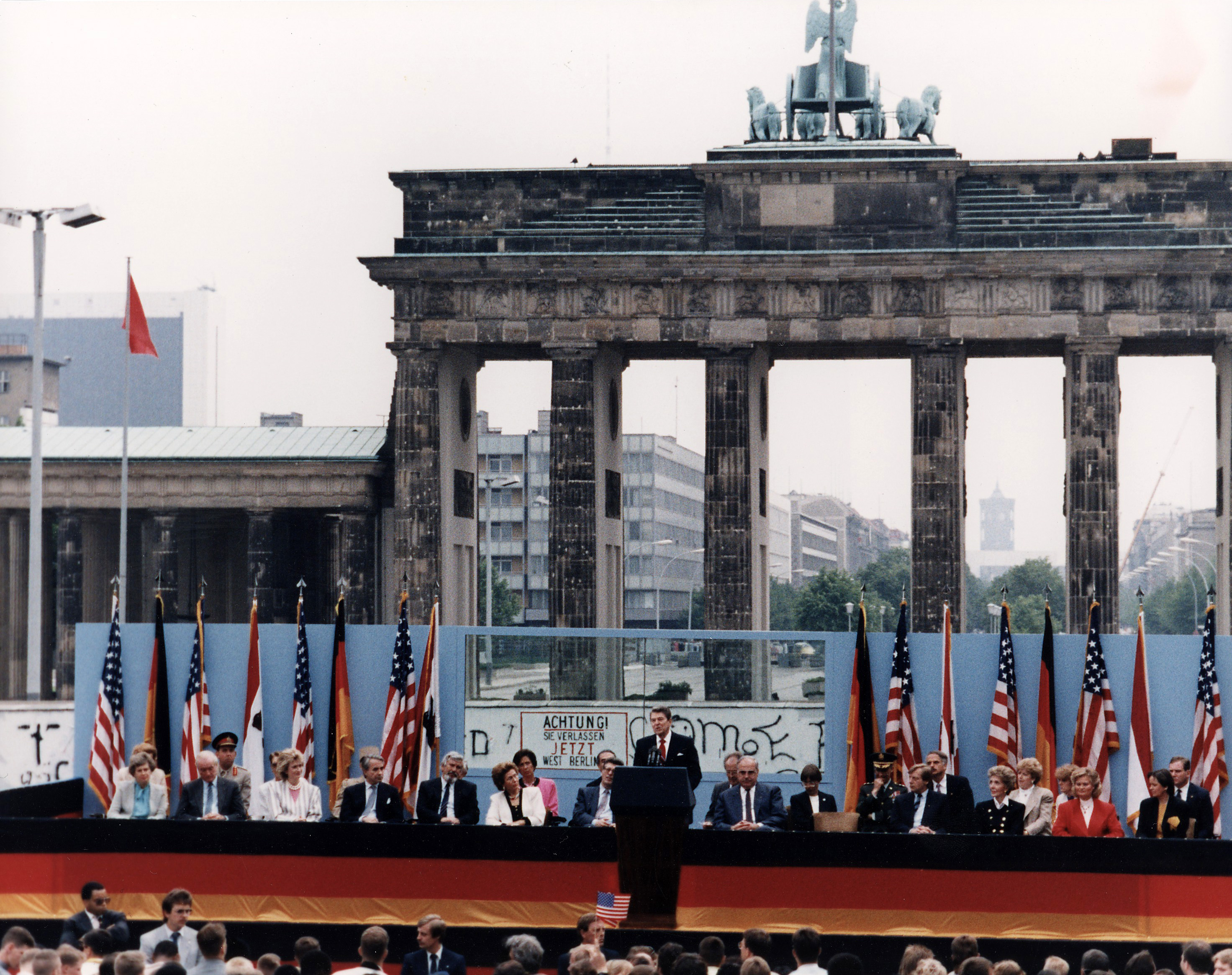
Reagan addressing the crowd at the Brandenburg Gate, June 12, 1987

On October 25, months after the Bitburg controversy, Kohl met with Reagan in New York City on the sidelines of the celebration of the 40th anniversary of the United Nations at the Waldorf Astoria hotel. Kohl was one of several world leaders to meet with Reagan. Kohl as part of his visit in New York City met with local Jewish leaders over the continuing controversy of the Bitburg commemoration visit. Kohl sought the meeting and met with several leaders, among them Israel Singer, the then-Secretary General of the World Jewish Congress. The luncheon was set up by Edgar Bronfman Sr., the then-President of the World Jewish Congress in his apartment in the Seagram Building. The meeting was not to clear the air over the controversy, but for Kohl to hear viewpoints, and was told that this meeting should have happened before the visit to which Kohl agreed with. Singer said to Kohl that "the victors and the vanquished cannot have a reconciliation without the victims", to which Kohl agreed with as well. In response to another appeal, Kohl was also said to have given the group assurances that West Germany would not sell Saudi Arabia its Leopard 2 tank. Kohl also spoke of West Germany's longstanding assistance to Israel and was then asked to assist Israel's efforts to gain diplomatic ties with Spain and Portugal.

Kohl returned to the U.S. for a state visit from October 20–23, 1986, his first visit to D.C. in two years, and the first state visit since 1982. A state dinner was held on the twentieth. On the twenty-first celebrating Oktoberfest at a Washington hotel stage, Kohl was interrupted when two men jumped onto the stage and displayed a banner that read "Solidarity with Nicaragua." According to a witness, the two came close enough to touching Kohl. On the twenty-third, Kohl visited Chicago for the Chicago Council on Foreign Relations.

Perhaps the most famous visit of Ronald Reagan's international trips as president took place from June 11–12, 1987, for a state visit. The visit was to commemorate the 750th Anniversary celebration of Berlin. On June 12, Reagan visited the Brandenburg Gate in West Berlin and addressed a crowd of about 20,000 people. The speech became famous for a key line from the middle part, "Tear down this wall!" in which he called Soviet leader Mikhail Gorbachev to open the Berlin Wall. The following day, The New York Times carried Reagan's picture on the front page, below the title "Reagan Calls on Gorbachev to Tear Down the Berlin Wall". In the post-Cold War era, it was often seen as one of the most memorable performances of an American president in Berlin after John F. Kennedy's 1963 speech "Ich bin ein Berliner".

Arriving in Berlin on June 12, Reagan and his wife were taken to the Reichstag where they viewed the wall from a balcony. Reagan then gave his speech at 2:00 p.m., in front of two panes of bulletproof glass shielding him from East Berlin. Among the spectators were West German president Richard von Weizsäcker, chancellor Kohl, and West Berlin mayor Eberhard Diepgen. In the speech, he said:

We welcome change and openness; for we believe that freedom and security go together, that the advance of human liberty can only strengthen the cause of world peace. There is one sign the Soviets can make that would be unmistakable, that would advance dramatically the cause of freedom and peace. General Secretary Gorbachev, if you seek peace, if you seek prosperity for the Soviet Union and Eastern Europe, if you seek liberalization: Come here to this gate! Mr. Gorbachev, open this gate! Mr. Gorbachev, tear down this wall!

On the day before Reagan's visit, 50,000 people had demonstrated against his presence in West Berlin. The city saw the largest police deployment in its history after World War II. During the visit itself, wide swaths of Berlin were closed off to prevent further anti-Reagan protests. The district of Kreuzberg, in particular, was targeted in this respect, with movement throughout this portion of the city in effect restrained completely (for instance the U1 U-Bahn line was shut down). Mentioning the demonstrators, Reagan said at the end of his speech: "I wonder if they ever asked themselves that if they should have the kind of government they apparently seek, no one would ever be able to do what they are doing again".

The speech received very little press coverage at the time according to Time twenty years later in 2007. John C. Kornblum, senior US diplomat in Berlin at the time of Reagan's speech, and US Ambassador to Germany from 1997 to 2001, said "[The speech] wasn't really elevated to its current status until 1989, after the wall came down." The Soviet press agency Telegraph Agency of the Soviet Union accused Reagan of giving an "openly provocative, war-mongering speech."

==== End of Reagan presidency ====
Kohl visited the U.S. for two last working visits of Reagan's presidency. The first was from February 17–19, 1988. The second and last took place on November 15. The visit took place six years after Kohl's first visit to the U.S. back in 1982. The visit was also the last interaction before Reagan's presidency ended on January 20, 1989. During the visit, Kohl and Reagan commemorated the German-American Friendship Garden. The garden commemorates 300 years of German immigration to the United States with flora and fauna native to both countries. The garden was the work of the German-American Tricentennial Commission and it was tasked to complete work on the project after Kohl's 1982 visit. Though this occurred in November, German-American Day takes place every October 6. The 100th Congress first officially recognized German-American Day in 1987.

=== George H. W. Bush, Revolutions of 1989, Reunifcation and end of relations ===
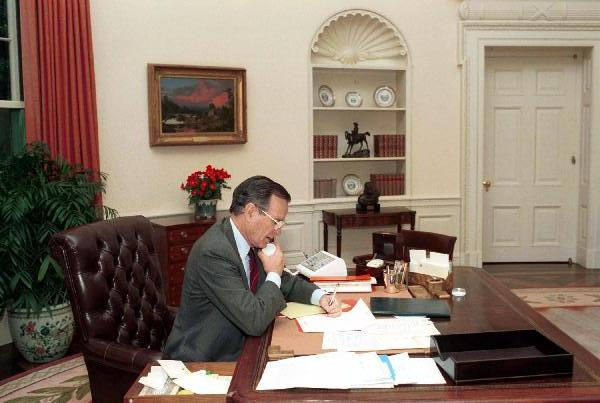
Bush on the phone with Helmut Kohl, May 5, 1989.

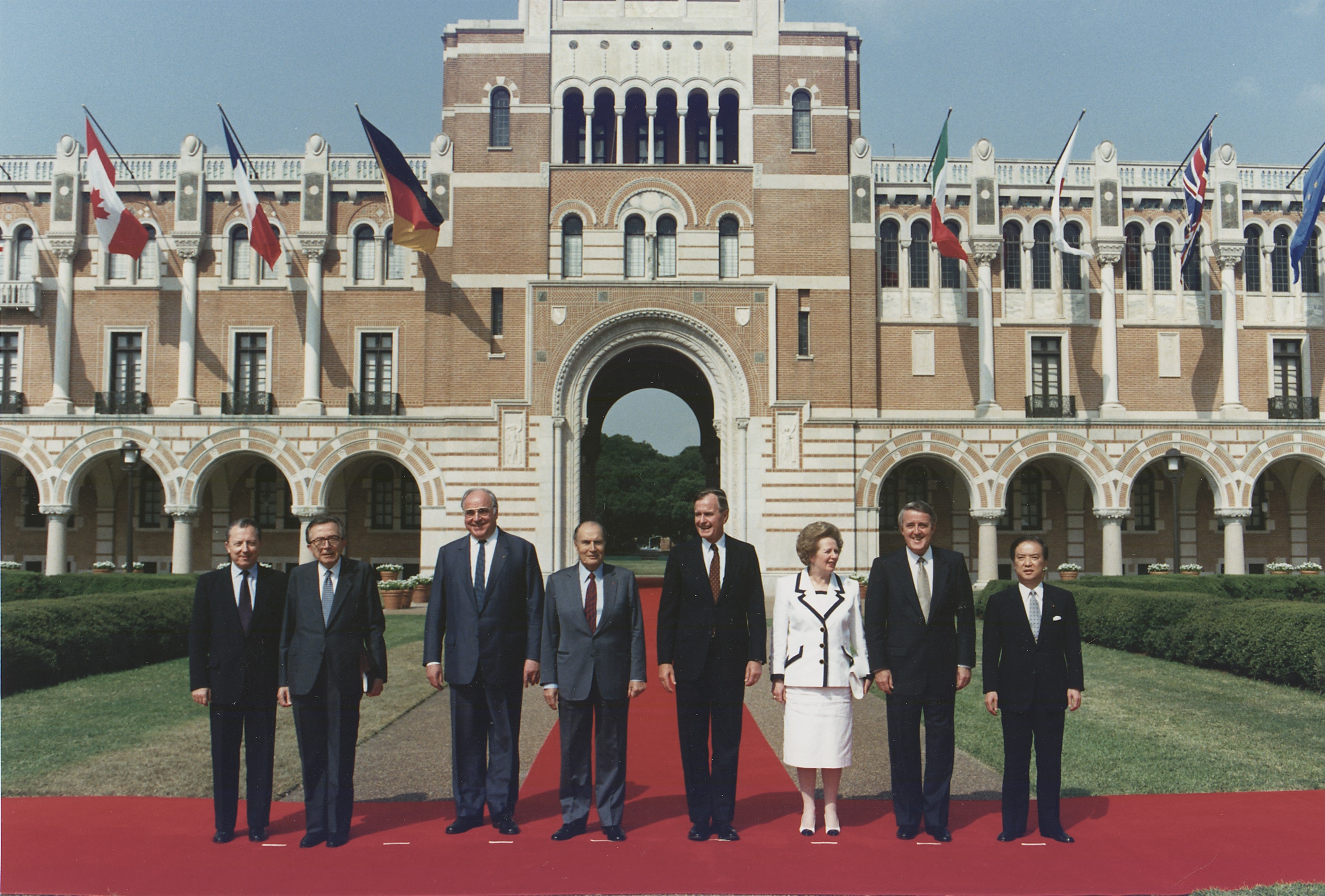
Bush (center in black suit) with from left to right: European Union Commission President Jacques Delors, Italian Prime Minister Giulio Andreotti, Kohl, French President François Mitterrand, British Prime Minister Margaret Thatcher, Canadian Prime Minister Brian Mulroney, and Japanse Preim Minister Toshiki Kaifu during the 16th G7 summit, July 9, 1990.

In the wave of the Revolutions of 1989, protests had broken out in East Germany that led to its inevitable dissolution and reunification with West Germany.

President George H. W. Bush had a phone call with Kohl on May 5, 1989, in an attempt to resolve the dispute over West Germany's demanding early talks with the Warsaw Pact on reducing short-range nuclear missiles in Europe. Some contents of the call were leaked which was criticized by West German officials.

Bush made his first and only visit to West Germany from May 30–31. This would be the last visit by an American president to the country before the collapse of East Germany and reunification of both Germany's and Berlin's. Following the success of the May 1989 Brussels NATO summit in which the 40th anniversary summit resulted in a last-minute compromise emerged as no immediate decision on Short-Range Nuclear Forces (SNF) modernization but a commitment to negotiate reductions in Conventional Armed Forces in Europe, as Bonn had wanted talks for the elimination of the SNF. But the U.S. and U.K. pushed for linking SNF talks to conventional force reductions and modernization first. Bush met with Kohl and gave a speech in Mainz at Rheingoldhalle Mainz in which he expressed his desire for the Berlin wall to come down and called for Glasnost in East Germany. A reference to Mikhail Gorbachev's policy in the Soviet Union.

On June 6, 1989, West German President Richard von Weizsaecker visited D.C. and met with Bush for a private visit.

On December 12, then-United States Secretary of State James Baker visited East Germany marking the first time a Secretary of State visited the GDR. Baker met with Hans Modrow, the head of the government of East Germany at the time. Baker said of his visit, "I felt it was important that we have the opportunity to have the premier and the people of the German Democratic Republic East Germany know of our support for the reforms that are taking place in this country." Modrow stated, "We started a dialogue with each other today" and described Baker's visit as a "political sign". Baker met with East German church leaders about the impending collapse of the East German economy if aid wasn't given and had emphasized the U.S.'s commitment to a peaceful reformation of the East German government. The visit came at a time when the Berlin Wall, and the inner German border fell in November, the Malta Summit from December 2 to 3 between the U.S. and the Soviet Union where the Cold War was declared over, and the following year's completion of German reunification. In November with the opening of the border between both Germany's, Egon Krenz, the last leader of the GDR, received a telegram from President George H. W. Bush congratulating Krenz for doing so.

From February 24–25, 1990, Kohl met with Bush at Camp David for discussions on the unification of Germany. Similar discussions continued with more visits by Kohl meeting with Bush at the White House on May 17 and June 8.

From July 8–11, Kohl made his last visit to the U.S. as the leader of West Germany when he attended the 16th G7 summit in Houston. The results and accomplishments of the summit was described as the "Bush-Kohl special relationship" as the deal given to Kohl was most of what he wanted in terms on financial aid to the Soviet Union, which Bush was opposed to, but was linked with aid to the new non-Communist governments of Eastern Europe. The alliance would create an aid program for nominally collective action, but each of the western countries and Japan were free to choose for itself which nations they would give the aide. In exchange, Kohl made concessions to the United States on trade and the environment, which included a pullback on global warming. West Germany had been pushing for a summit declaration that would have committed the seven nations to "clear reductions" in emissions of carbon dioxide and other greenhouse gases, but Bush was opposed to any such declaration. Kohl had told Bush in their meeting that "there is no contradiction between global environmental protection and growth," according to West German Finance Minister Theo Waigel. Kohl and other European leaders made pledges to cut emissions, but the U.S. made no such commitment even as Kohl had wanted the declaration to go further on the issue. He had called for "internationally binding regulations" to limit carbon dioxide emissions "at the earliest possible date" in a letter to the other six summit leaders the previous month. West Germany as part of the concession on trade, agreed on a framework for negotiating reductions in agricultural subsidies that U.S. officials had favored. It was aimed at reducing global trade barriers. For the U.S., agricultural subsidies stood as a major barrier to exporting agricultural products to Europe and Japan by less-developed nations and American farmers.

In 1990, German reunification was allowed with the signing and implementation of the Treaty on the Final Settlement with Respect to Germany which renounced France, the Soviet Union, the United Kingdom, and the United States' control of Germany. The treaty was signed by the four powers with both East and West Germany in Moscow on September 12 with its full effect taking place on March 15, 1991. On September 25, President George H. W. Bush submitted the treaty to the United States Congress for ratification and was unanimously passed by the United States Senate. Afterward, the U.S. recognized the West German state as the legitimate successor to both German states as the five constituent federal states of the German Democratic Republic were absorbed by the Federal Republic of Germany. The U.S. wasn't compelled to recognize the reunified Germany as a new nation and subsequently closed its embassy to East Germany in Berlin on October 2, 1990, while maintaining the embassy to former West Germany in Bonn. On October 3, Bush called Kohl briefly congratulating him on reunification.

On November 18, Bush made his second visit to Germany and the first by an American president after German reunification. Meeting with Kohl, he visited Speyer and Ludwigshafen in Rhineland-Palatinate, the home region of Kohl. He attended an organ recital at the historic Speyer Cathedral before addressing thousands of residents in the town square. Bush's arrival was during the pouring rain where he was nonetheless met with cheers of thousands of German citizens. The visit was to commemorate the successful German reunification two months earlier in October.

The embassy in former East Berlin would later reopen as the official American embassy to Germany in 1998 while the chancery in Bonn was permanently closed in 1999.

== Gallery ==
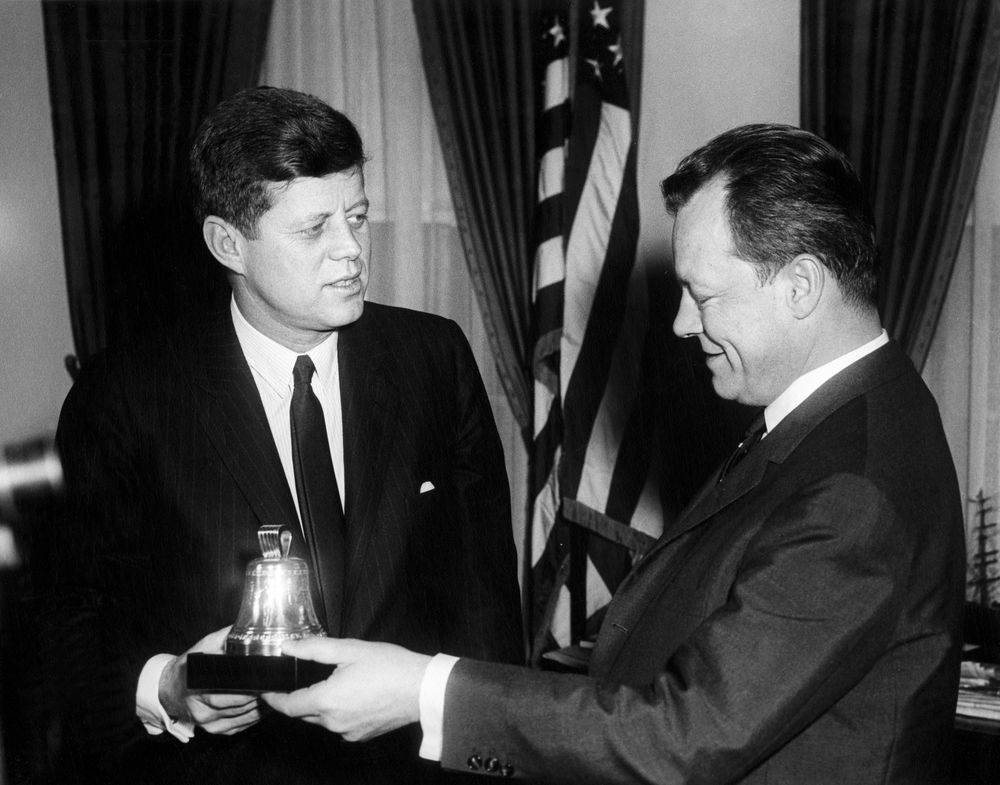
Willy Brandt gifting Kennedy a replica of the Freedom Bell in Berlin on March 13, 1961.

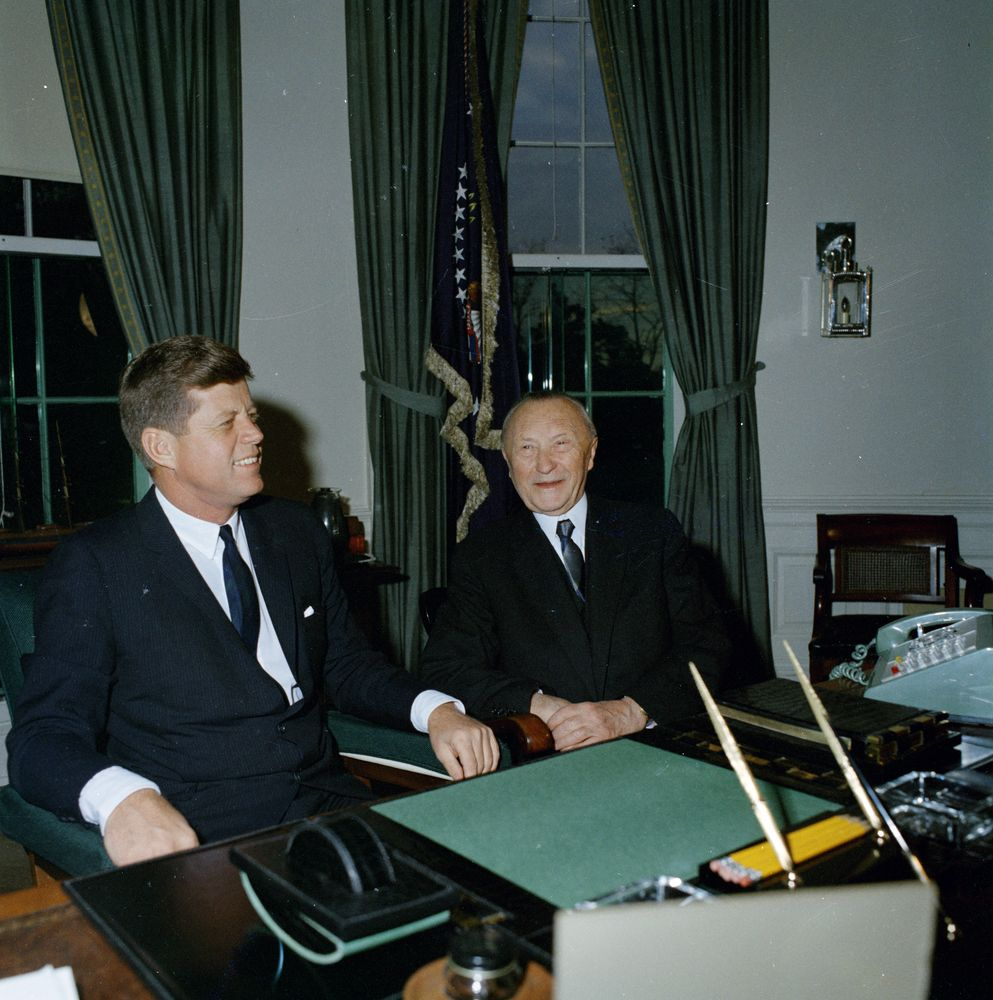
Kennedy and Adenauer on November 14, 1962.

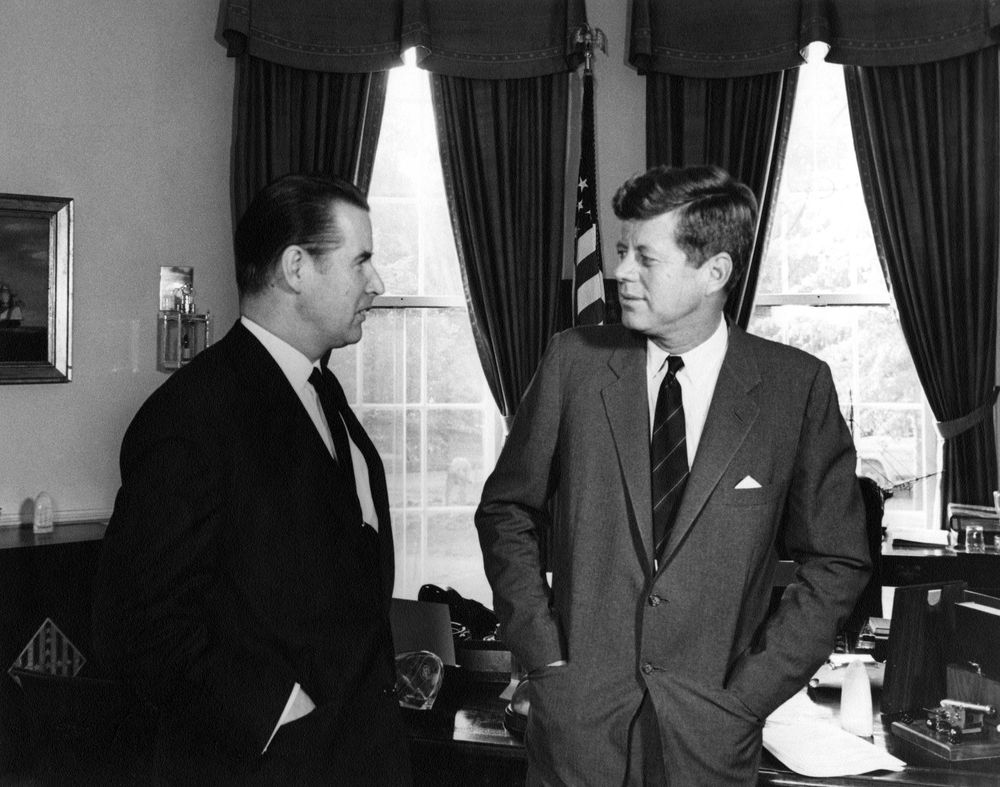
Kennedy and Foreign Minister Gerhard Schröder on October 17, 1962.

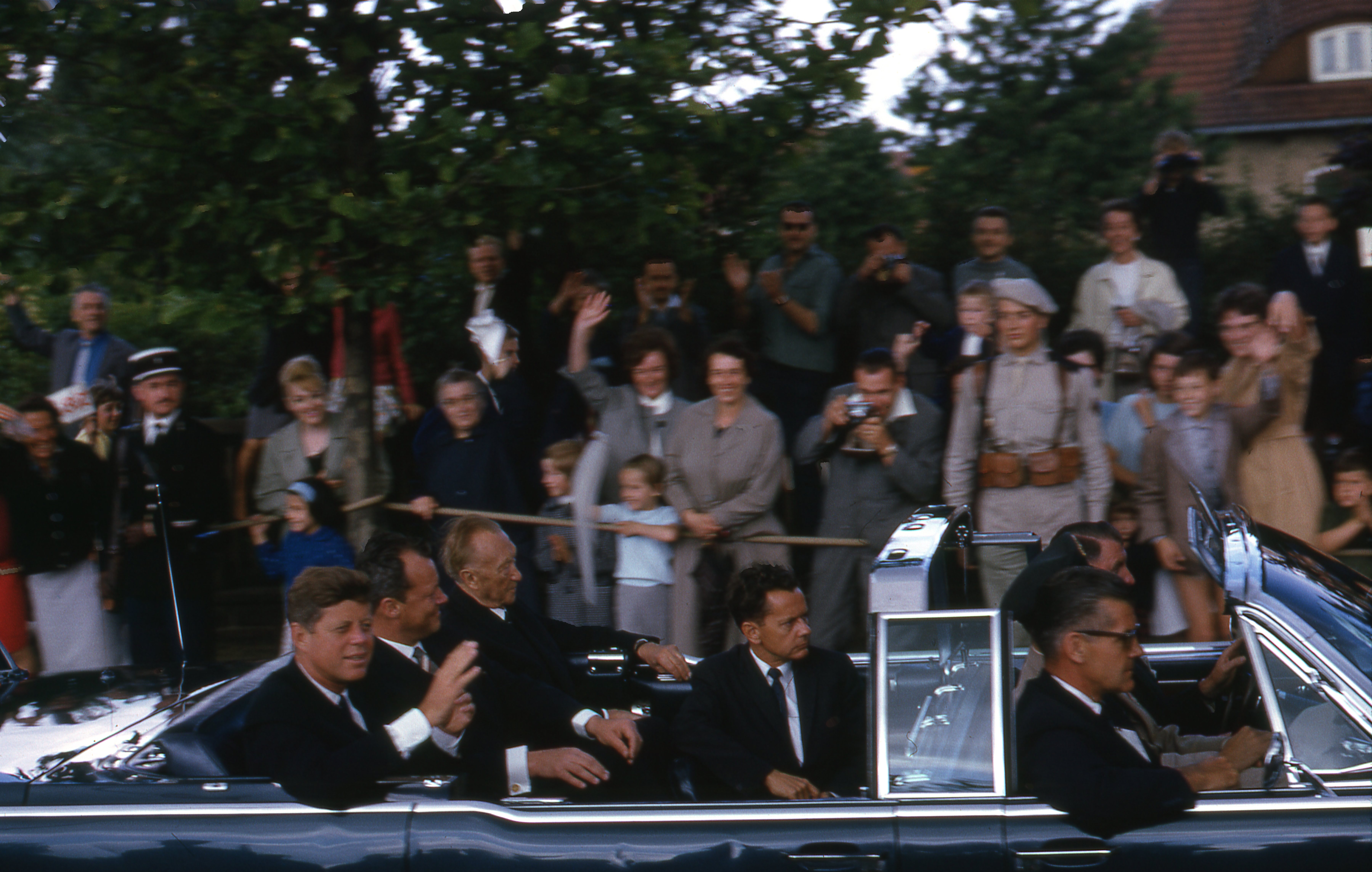
Kennedy, Brandt, and Adenauer riding together in Berlin en route to Kennedy delivering his Ich bin ein berliner speech .

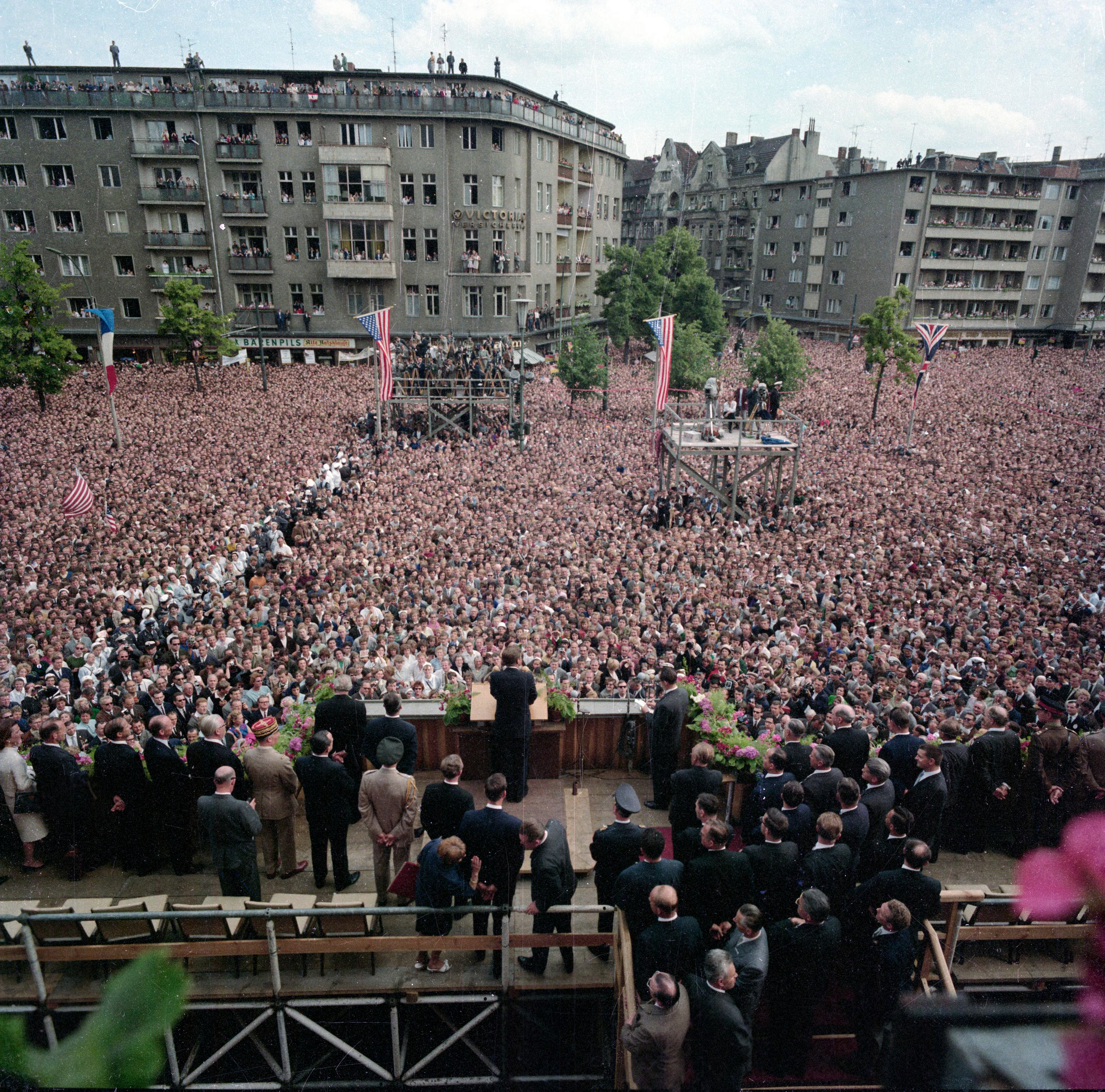
Kennedy delivering his Ich bin ein berliner speech to a crowd of more than 150,000 in West Berlin.

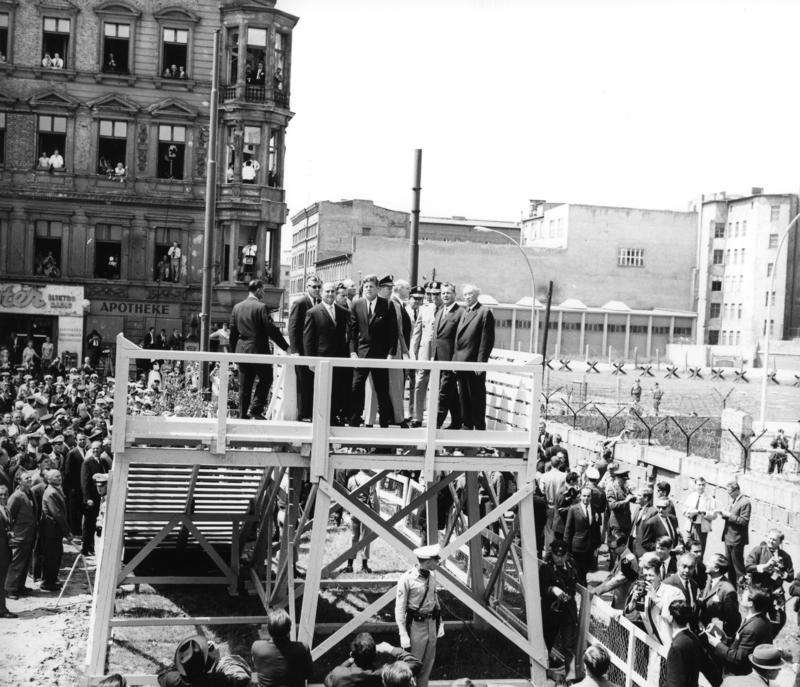
Kennedy visiting the Berlin Wall at Checkpoint Charlie.

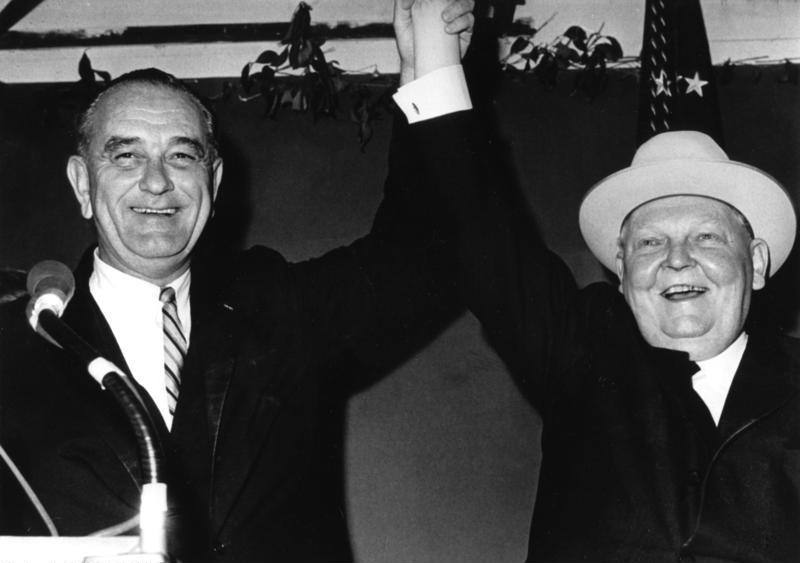
Johnson and Ludwig Erhard on December 29, 1963, during a state dinner. Erhard wearing the cowboy hat gifted by Johnson.

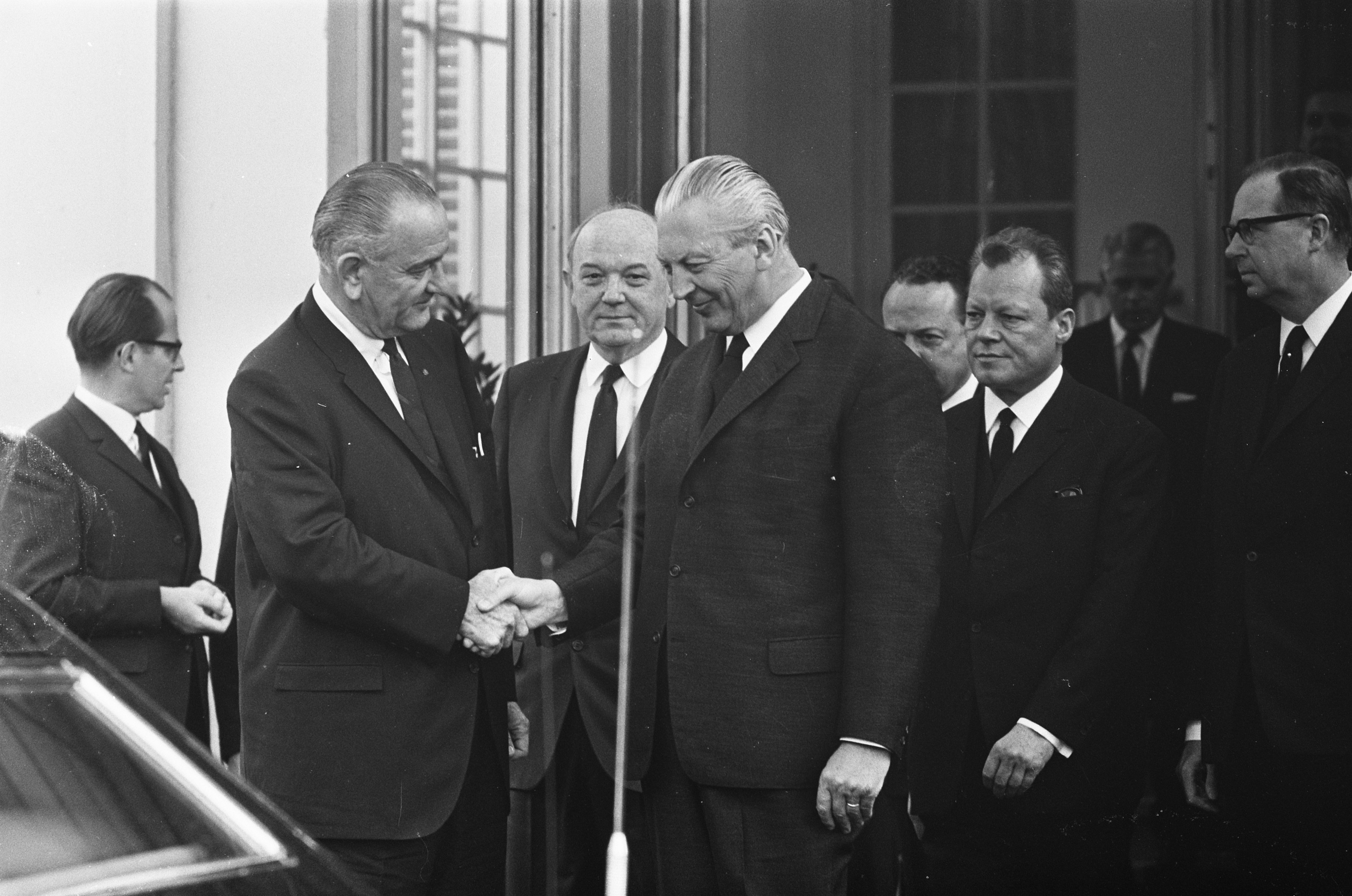
Johnson, Kiesinger, Dean Rusk, and Willy Brandt on April 24, 1967.

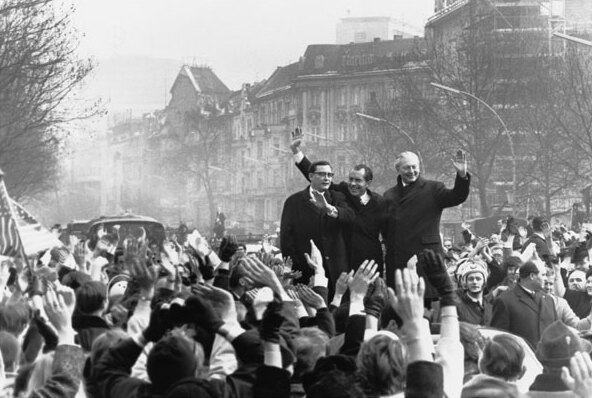
Richard Nixon with Kurt Georg Kiesinger and Klaus Schütz waving to the crowd in West Berlin on February 27, 1969.

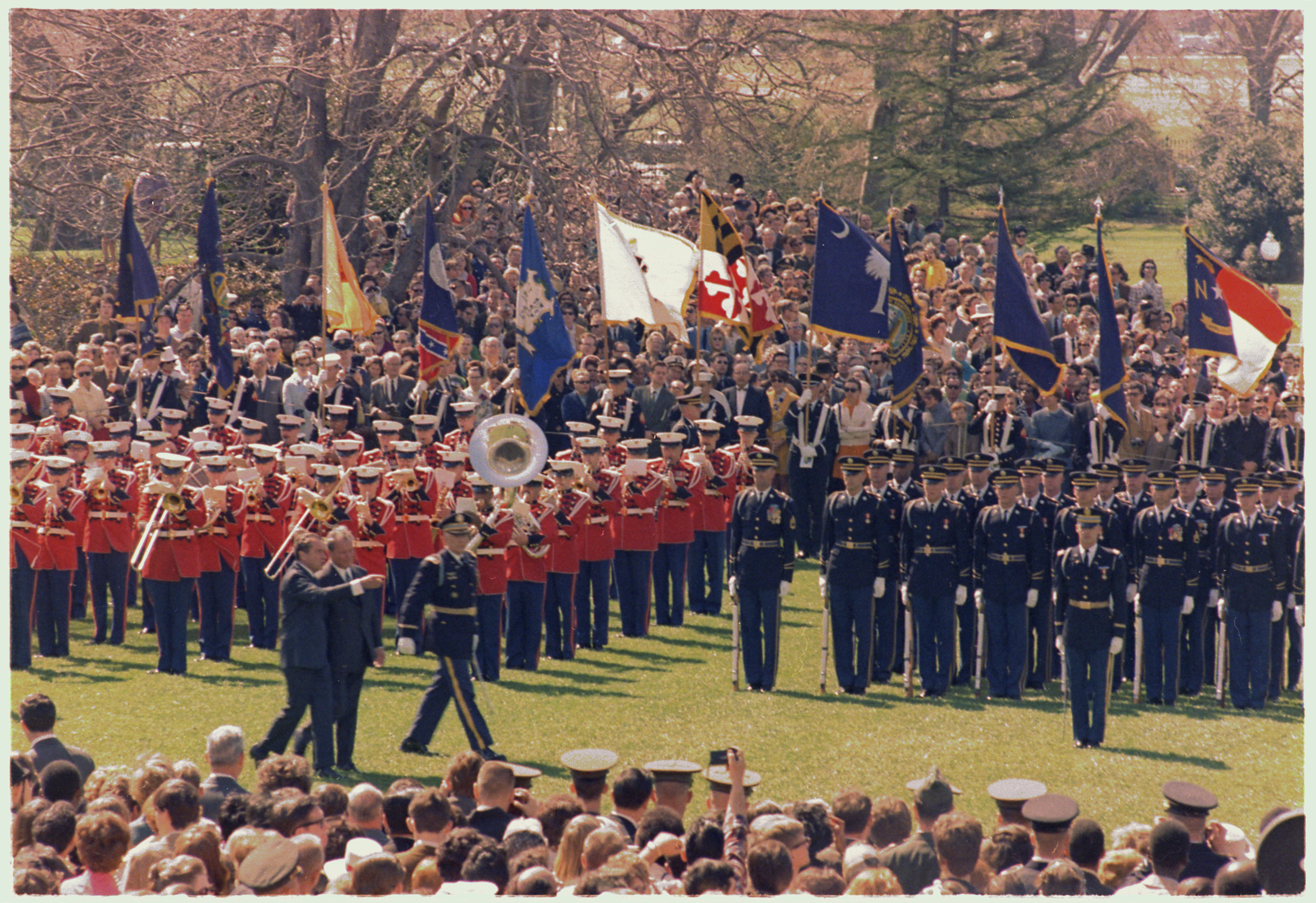
Nixon and Brandt on the South Lawn for Brandt's welcoming ceremony for Brandt on April 10, 1970.

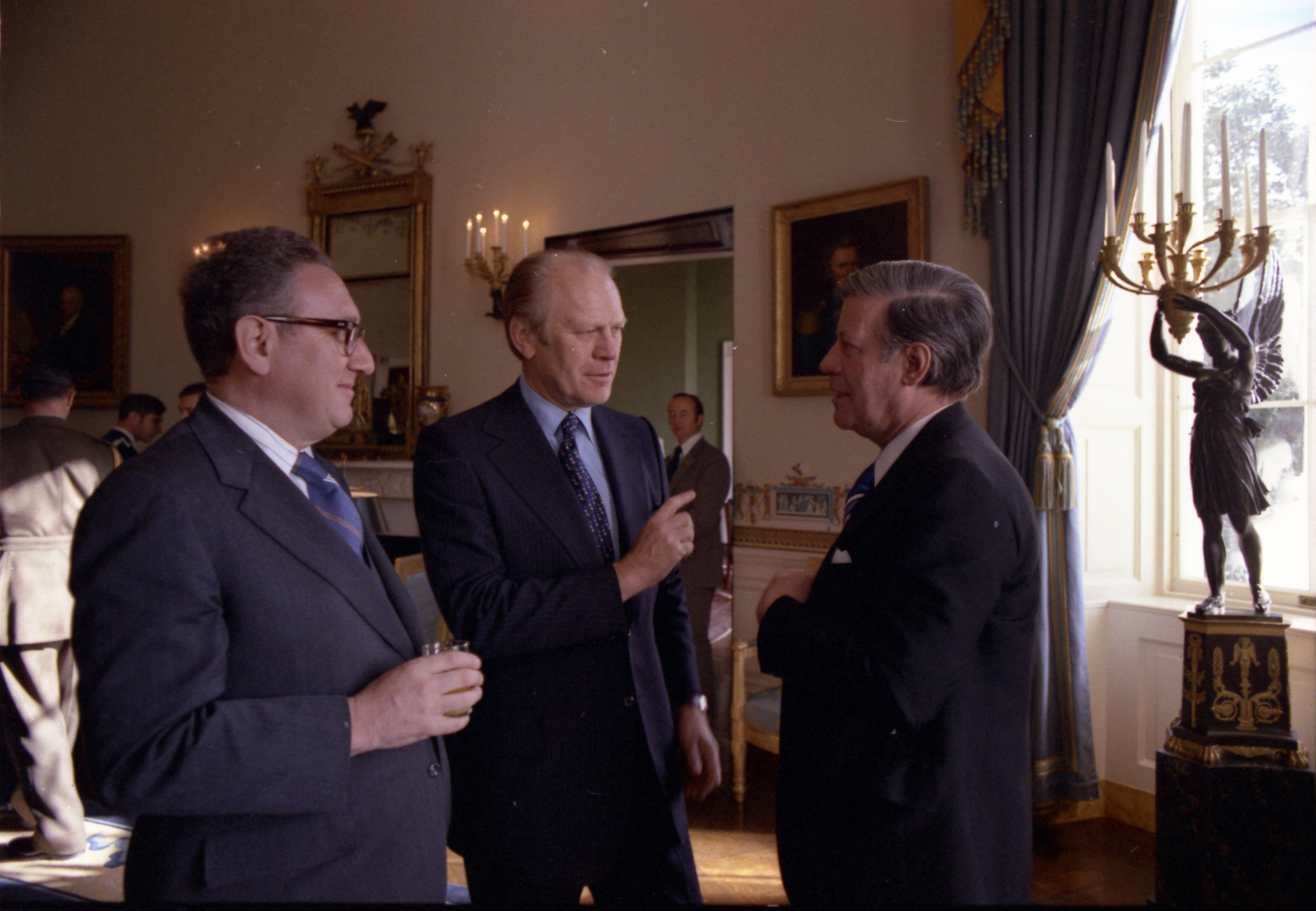
Henry Kissinger, Gerald Ford, and Helmut Schmidt talking in the Blue Room at a Reception following the State Arrival Ceremony for Chancellor Schmidt on December 5, 1974.

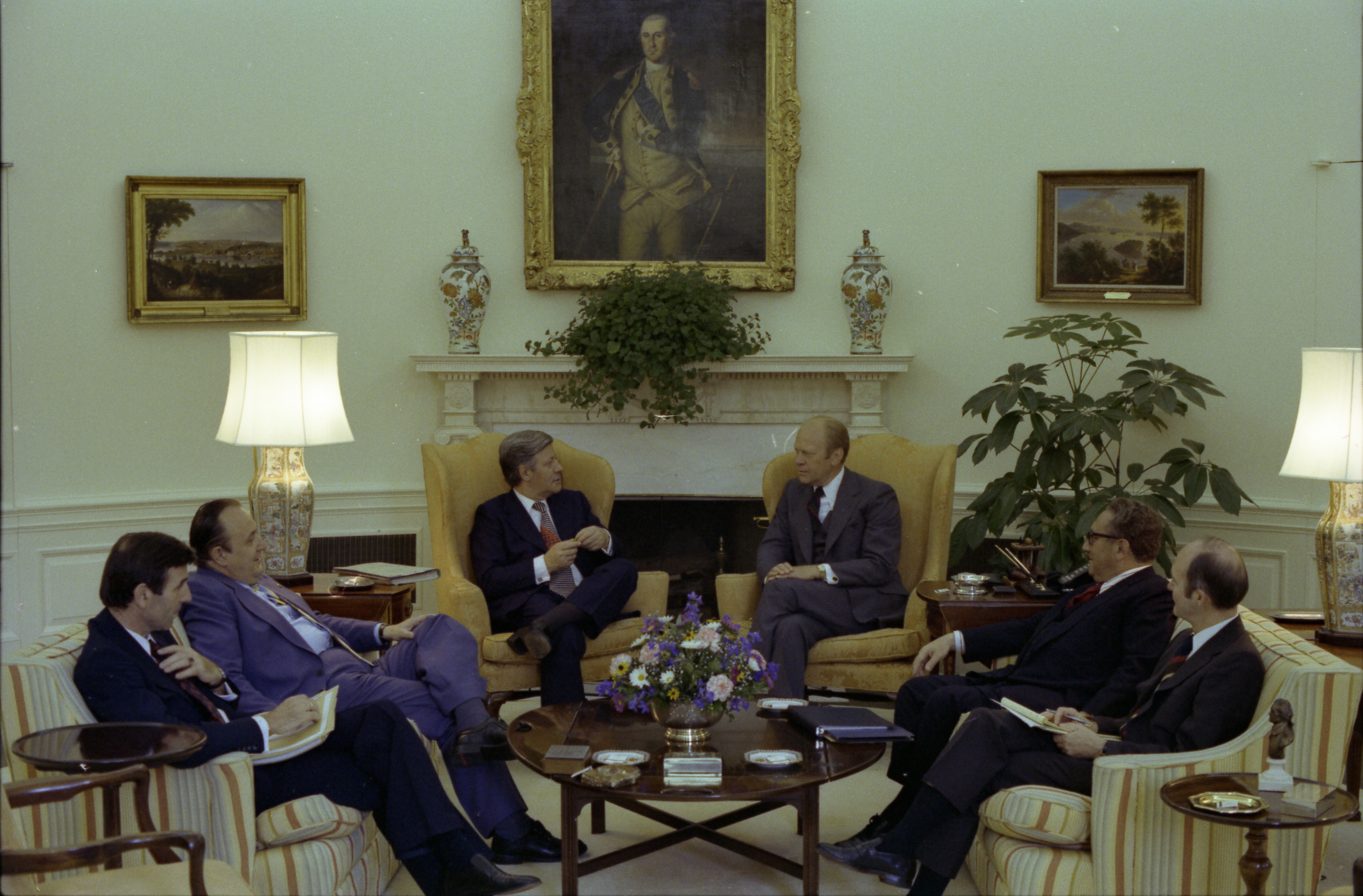
Ford and Schmidt in the Oval Office on July 15, 1976.

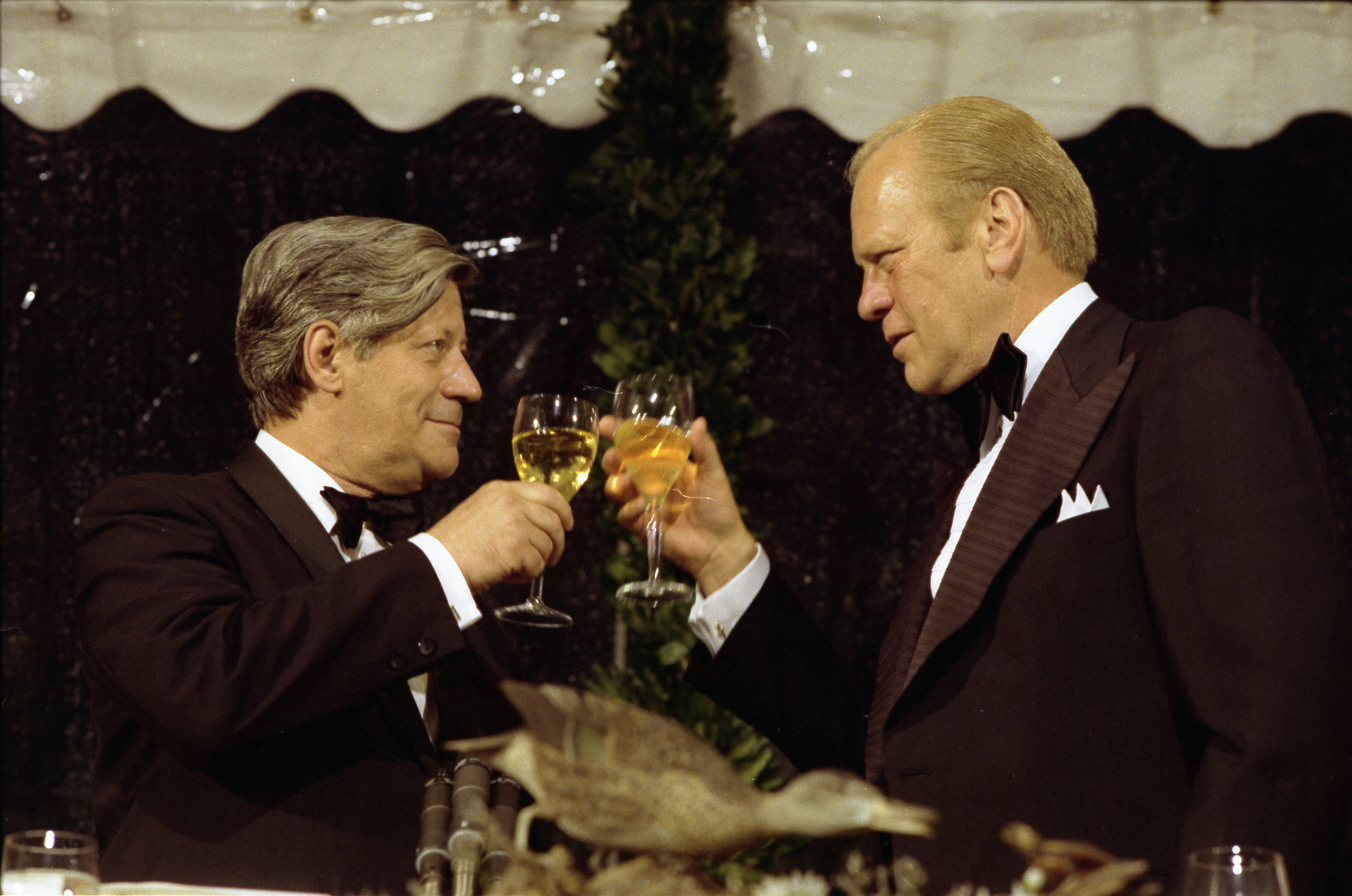
Ford and Schmidt at the state dinner for Schmidt on July 15, 1976

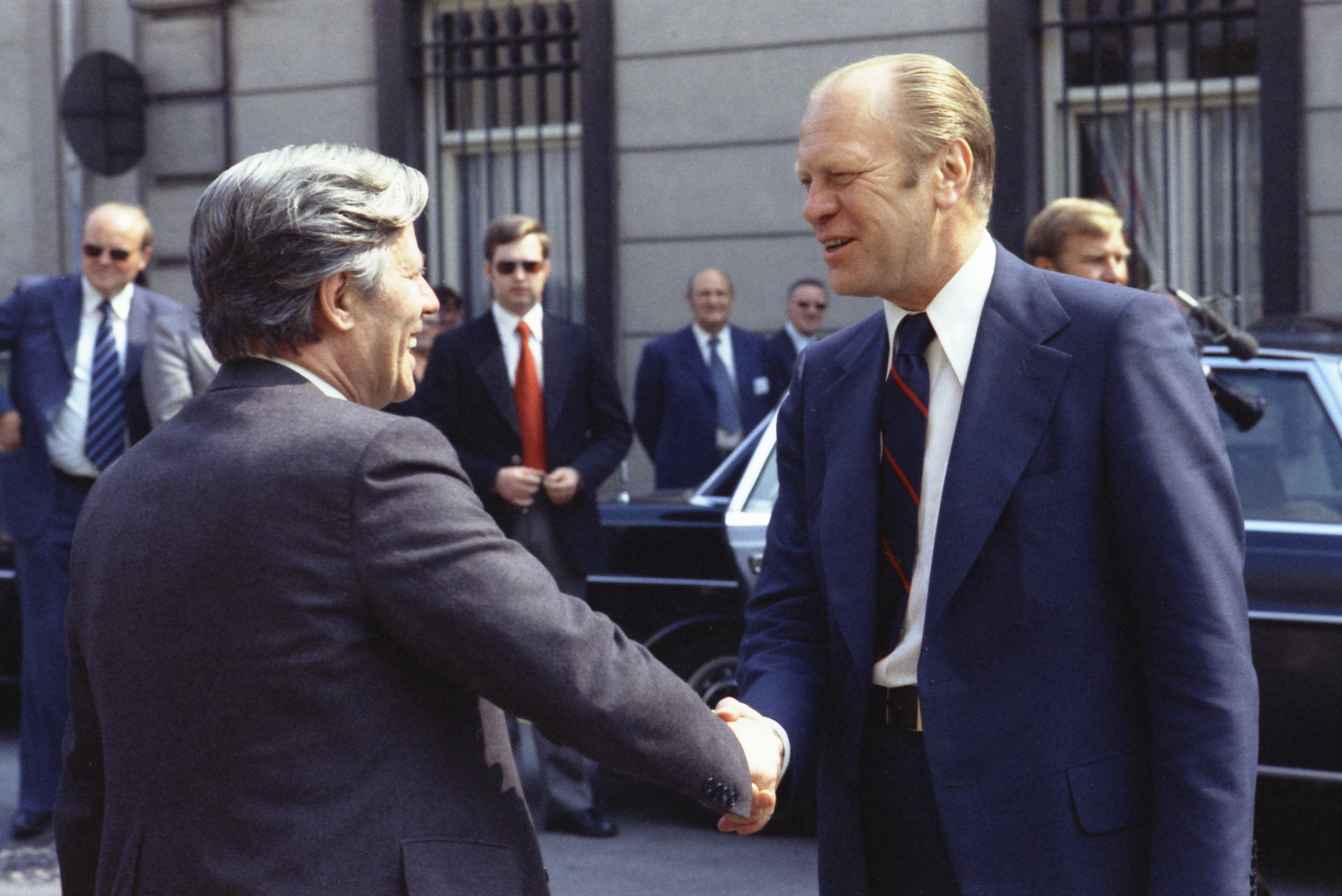
Gerald Ford escorts Helmut Schmidt, Chancellor of the Federal Republic of Germany, to his limousine after a luncheon meeting at the American Embassy Residence during the 1975 Brussels NATO summit

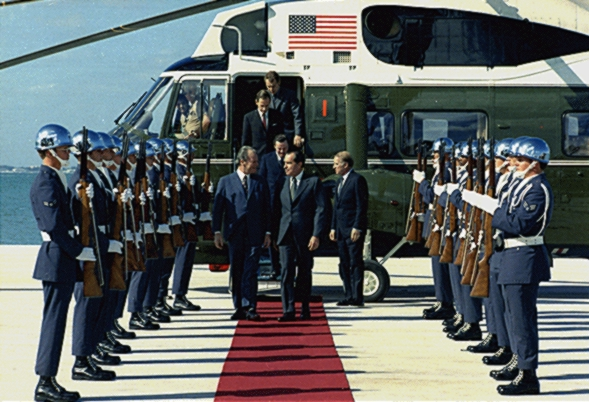
Willy Brandt and Nixon in Key Biscayne, Florida on December 28, 1971.

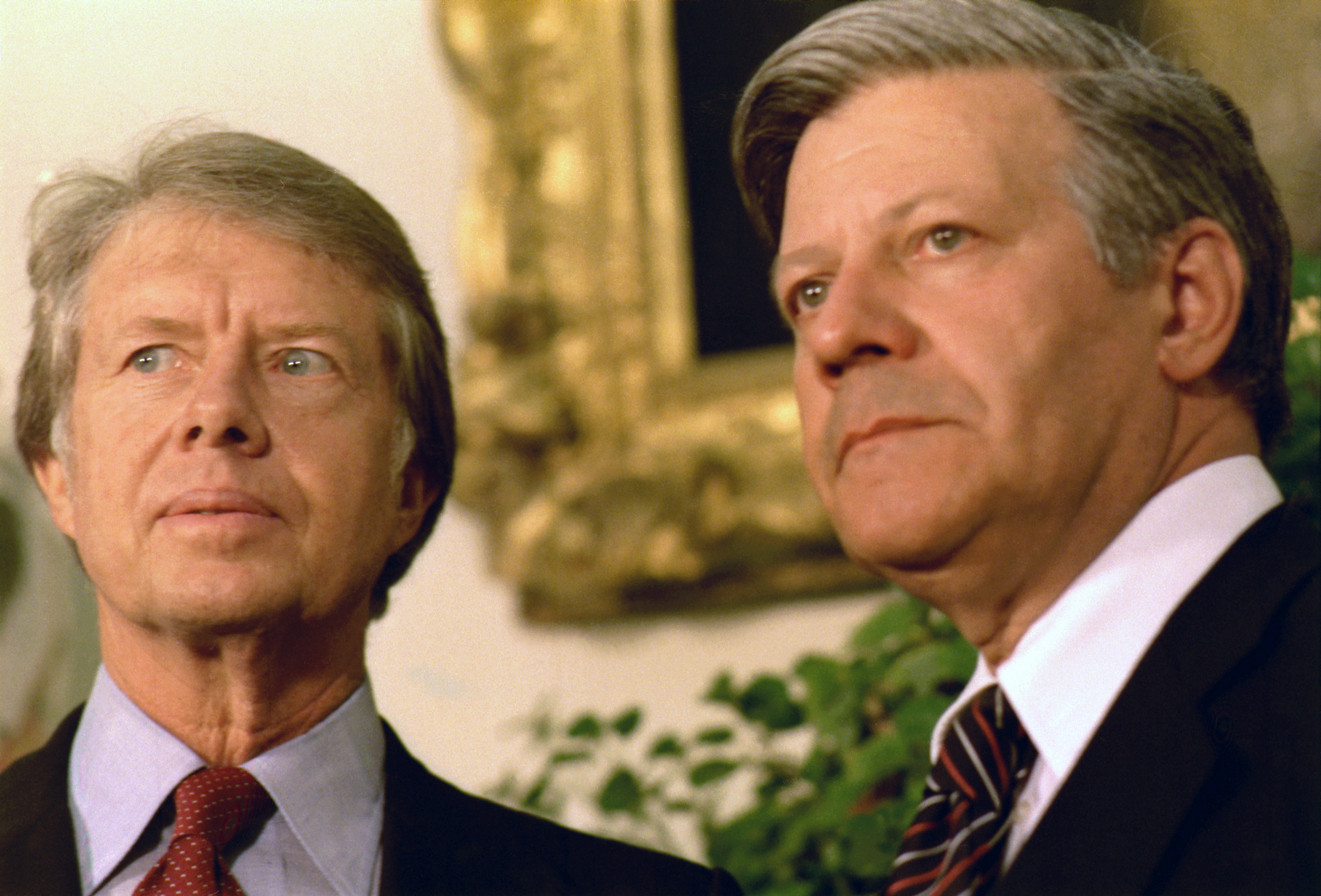
Jimmy Carter and Willy Brandt at the White House on July 13, 1977.

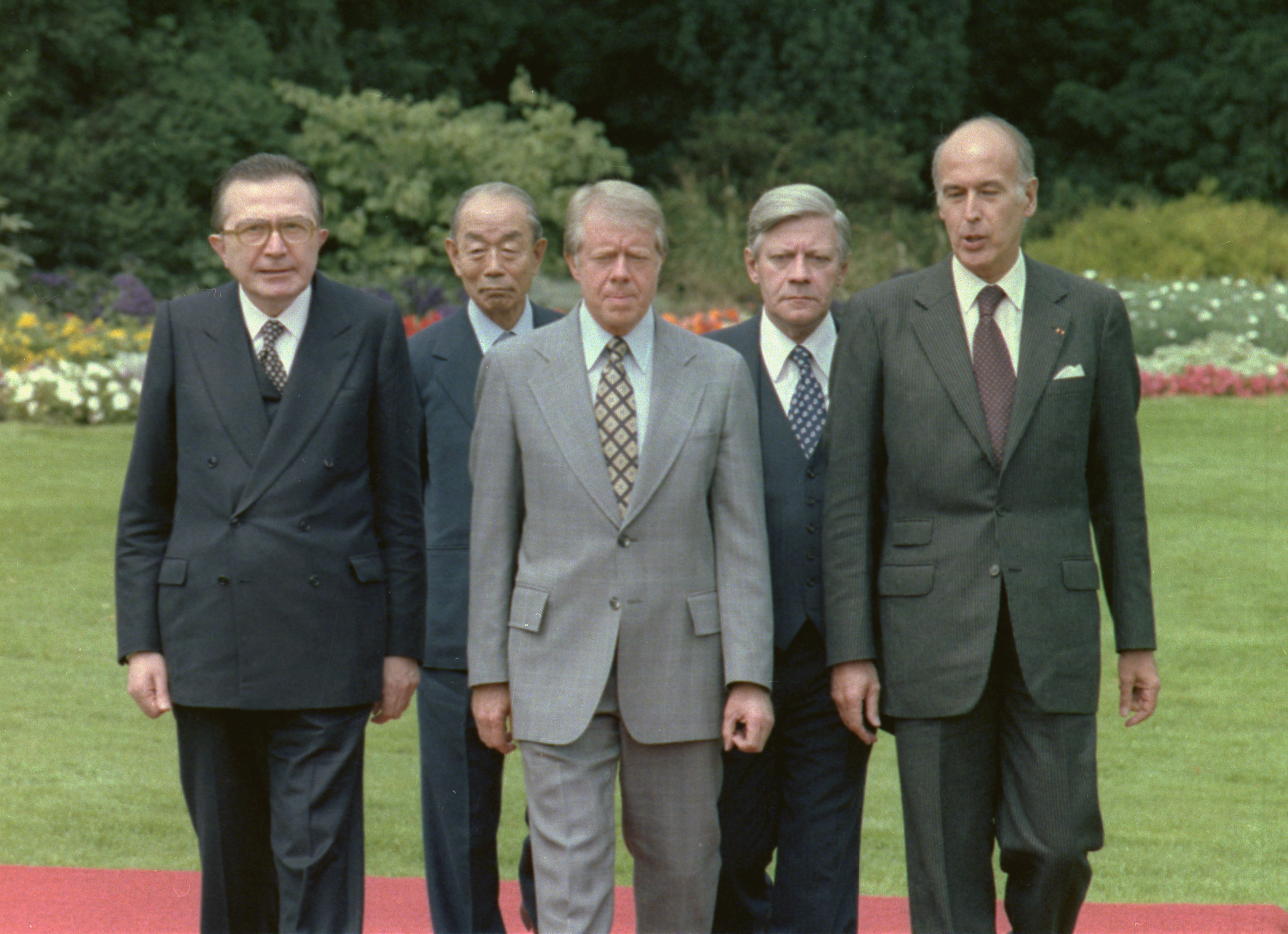
Giulio Andreotti, Takeo Fukuda, Jimmy Carter, Helmut Schmidt and Valéry Giscard d'Estaing at the G7 Economic Summit in Bonn, Germany, July 16, 1978

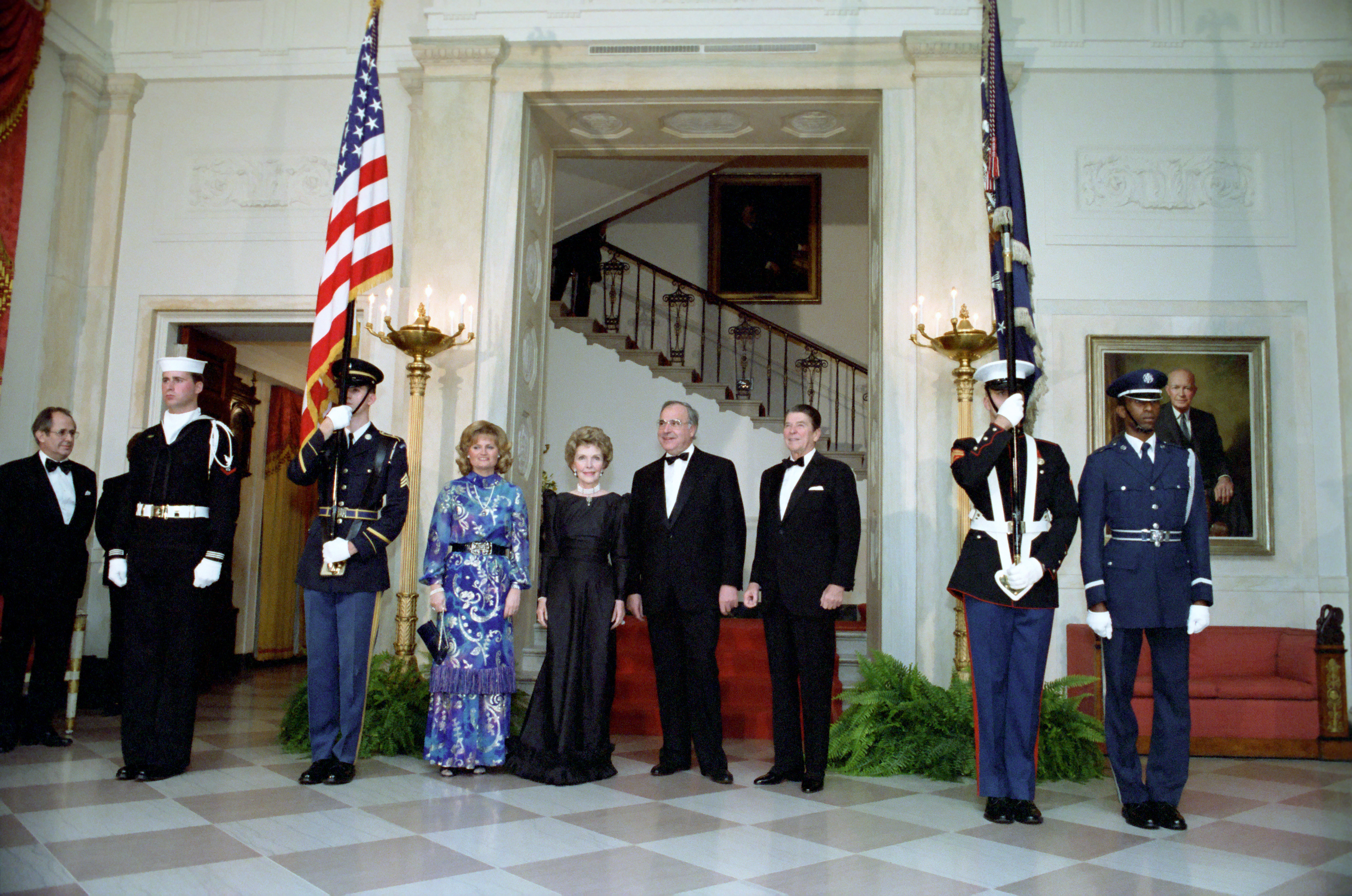
Reagan and Kohel with their wives at a White House Ceremony on November 15, 1982.

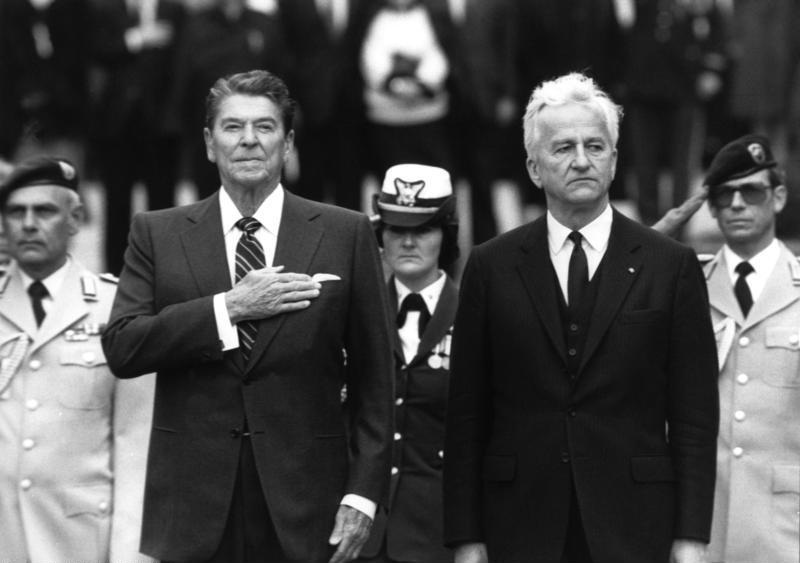
Ronald Reagan with Richard von Weizsäcker in Bonn, May 2, 1985.

== See also ==
- Foreign relations of the United States
- Foreign relations of Germany
- Embassy of the United States, Bonn
- Embassy of the United States, Berlin
- Embassy of Germany, Washington, D.C.
- Ambassadors of the United States to Germany
- Ambassadors of Germany to the United States
- Germany–United States relations
- East Germany–West Germany relations
- East Germany–United States relations
- East Germany–Soviet Union relations
- West Germany–Soviet Union relations
- Soviet Union–United States relations
