= East Germany–United States relations =

- East Germany: United States

Diplomatic mission
- Embassy of Germany, Washington, D.C.: Embassy of the United States, Berlin

Relations between East Germany and the United States formally began in 1974 until the former's collapse in 1990. The relationship between the two nations was among the most hostile during the Cold War as both sides were mutually suspicious of each other. Both sides conducted routine espionage against each other and conducted prisoner exchanges for their respective citizens which included spies for both the Americans and Soviets.

East Germany maintained extremely close relations with the Soviet Union, the main rival of the United States during this period, and was viewed as a proxy state of the Soviets. The US had better and close relations with West Germany, East Germany's closest rival, which was viewed by East Germany and the Soviets as a proxy state of the US.

== History ==
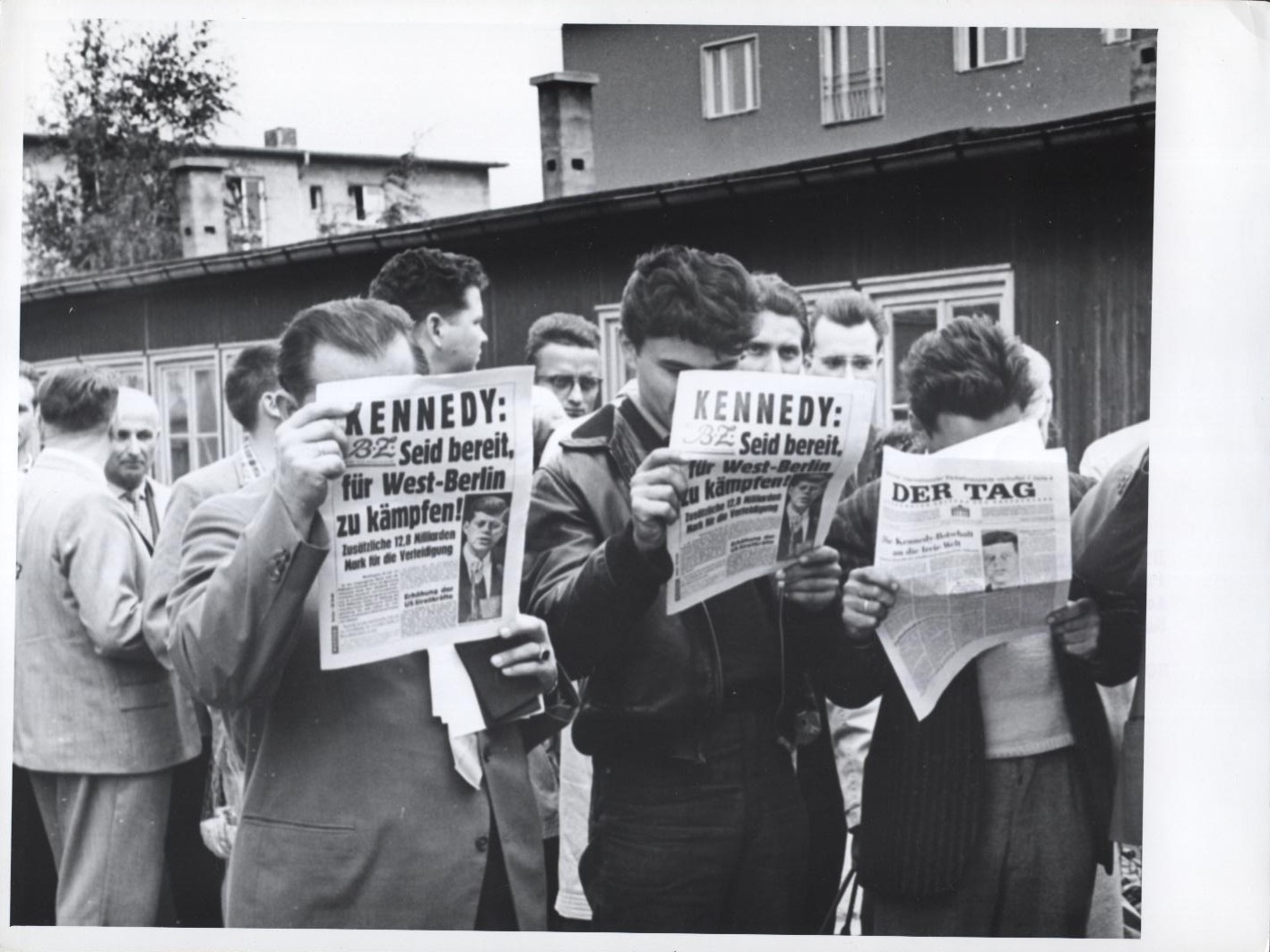
East German refugees reading news accounts of President John F. Kennedy’s July 25, 1961, address to the American people about the growing conflict with the Soviet Union over the status of Berlin.

Following the end of World War II after Germany's surrender in 1945 on May 8, the U.S. had occupied Germany until 1949. The Soviet Union's occupied German Zone was what would become East Germany (GDR) being formally founded on October 7, 1949. The response by the U.S. was that it would not recognize the establishment of the East German state and that it was "without any legal validity," and that it would "continue to give full support to the Government of the German Federal Republic at Bonn in its efforts to restore a truly free and democratic Germany." Efforts to restore Germany under one nation collapsed which led to West Germany and the U.S. establishing formal relations on May 6, 1955.

In 1972 after the signing of the Basic Treaty between East and West Germany, the United States began negotiations to establish formal relations with East Germany from July 15 to July 26. Contact was only made possible after the Four Power Agreement on Berlin which was agreed upon by France, the United Kingdom, the United States, and the Soviet Union which allowed both East and West Germany to maintain relations and reestablished ties between the two parts of Berlin, improved travel and communications between the two parts of the city and brought numerous improvements for the residents of the Western Sectors.

On September 4, 1974, East Germany and the United States signed and released a joint communiqué announcing the formal establishment of relations. In December 1974, both countries formalized relations and named ambassadors with the appointment of Rolf Sieber for East Germany and John Sherman Cooper for the U.S. The United States was represented in then-East Berlin, and East Germany was represented with a diplomatic office as part of the then-West German embassy and now the current Embassy of Germany in Washington, D.C.

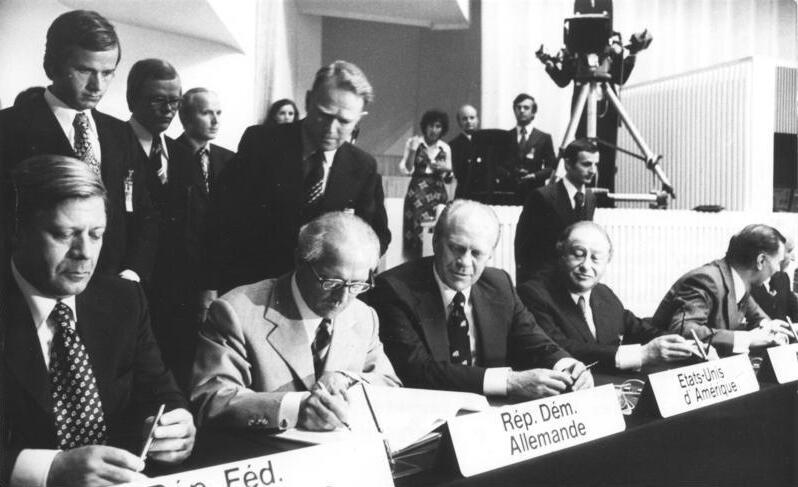
Chancellor of Federal Republic of Germany (West Germany) Helmut Schmidt, Chairman of the State Council of the German Democratic Republic (East Germany) Erich Honecker, US President Gerald Ford and Austrian chancellor Bruno Kreisky on August 1, 1975, signing the Helsinki Accords.

From July 30 to August 1, 1975, U.S. President Gerald Ford met with Erich Honecker and had a brief conversation during the Helsinki summit which led to the passing of the Helsinki Accords. This marked the first time leaders of both countries met and spoke to each other.

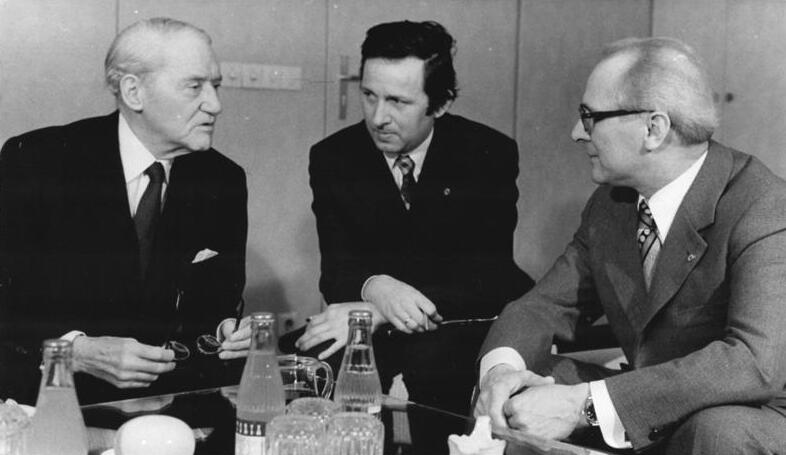
U.S. Ambassador John Sherman Cooper (left) meeting with Erich Honecker (right) on February 27, 1975, in East Berlin.

In September 1979, a consular treaty was signed, although no U.S. consulates were set up in any East German cities outside East Berlin.

In January 1984, East Germany allowed six East Germans to leave the country that had been holding up in the American embassy waiting to be granted asylum as well as protection from being arrested by East German authorities in a letter they had sent to then-President Ronald Reagan. The group had threatened to go on a hunger strike until they would be allowed to leave by the GDR. Eventually, they were allowed to leave East Germany in three automobiles past a checkpoint at the Berlin Wall into West Berlin.

On January 10, 1986, Erich Honecker met with a U.S. Congressional delegation led by Tom Lantos in Berlin marking the first time senior leaders from both countries met face-to-face in a formal manner and in each other's respective nation since the establishment of relations. Congressman Benjamin Gilman told the press that the delegation had shared their concerns about "travel, freedom of religion, the border of West Berlin, current world-political problems and questions concerning bilateral relations between the German Democratic Republic (East Germany) and the U.S.A." The meeting lasted for three-and-a-half hours and was the first Congressional delegation to visit East Germany since 1983. The 1983 delegation hadn't met with Honecker.

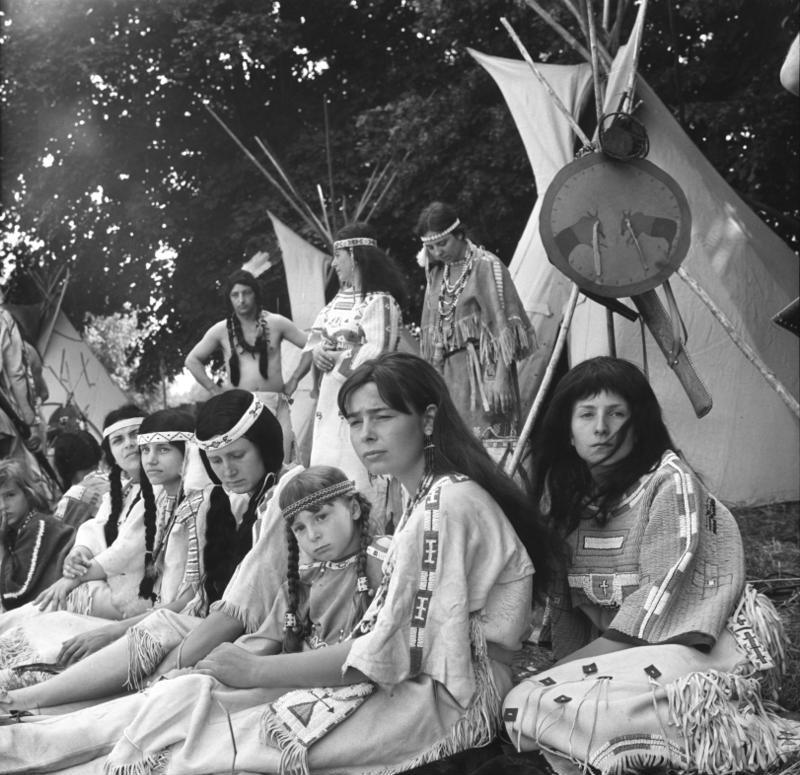
Interessengemeinschaft Mandan-Indianer Leipzig 1970, the popular image of Native Americans made Indian living history quite popular in East Germany.

On October 4, 1989, eighteen East German citizens entered the U.S. Embassy seeking asylum prompting East German police officers to seal off access to the embassy from a crowd trying to make their way into the embassy as well. The eighteen citizens snuck their way inside through a side door and were later persuaded to leave on the assurance the GDR government would favorably view their emigrant visa applications.

On December 12, 1989, then-United States Secretary of State James Baker visited East Germany marking the first time a Secretary of State visited the GDR. Baker met with Hans Modrow, the head of the government of East Germany at the time. Baker said of his visit, "I felt it was important that we have the opportunity to have the premier and the people of the German Democratic Republic East Germany know of our support for the reforms that are taking place in this country." Modrow stated, "We started a dialogue with each other today" and described Baker's visit as a "political sign". Baker met with East German church leaders about the impending collapse of the East German economy if aid wasn't given and had emphasized the U.S.'s commitment to a peaceful reformation of the East German government. The visit came at a time when the Berlin Wall, and the inner German border fell in November, the Malta Summit from December 2 to 3 between the U.S. and the Soviet Union where the Cold War was declared over, and the following year's completion of German reunification. In November with the opening of the border between both Germany's, Egon Krenz, the last leader of the GDR, received a telegram from President George H. W. Bush congratulating Krenz for doing so.

On June 11, 1990, Prime Minister Lothar de Maizière became the first and only leader of East Germany to visit the White House meeting with H.W. Bush. Bush discussed what was described "about his vision as to the postwar Europe, post-German unification Europe." Maizière also spoke at Georgetown University.

German reunification was allowed with the signing and implementation of the Treaty on the Final Settlement with Respect to Germany which renounced France, the Soviet Union, the United Kingdom, and the United States' control of Germany. The treaty was signed by the four powers with both East and West Germany in Moscow on September 12 with its full effect taking place on March 15, 1991. On September 25, President George H. W. Bush submitted the treaty to the United States Congress for ratification and was unanimously passed by the United States Senate. Afterward, the U.S. recognized the West German state as the legitimate successor to both German states as the five constituent federal states of the German Democratic Republic were absorbed by the Federal Republic of Germany. The U.S. wasn't compelled to recognize the reunified Germany as a new nation and subsequently closed its embassy to East Germany in Berlin on October 2, 1990, while maintaining the embassy to former West Germany in Bonn.

The embassy in former East Berlin would later reopen as the official American embassy to Germany in 1998 while the chancery in Bonn was permanently closed in 1999.

=== Prisoner exchanges and espionage ===
Over the years both the American and East German governments had been involved in routine espionage activities against one another. The more prominent of these have resulted in prisoner exchanges and criminal convictions.

==== Prisoner exchanges ====
In August 1977, Alan Van Norman, a 20-year-old college student, had been arrested by East German authorities as he was trying to help a family escape to West Germany. An East German lawyer, Wolfgang Vogel, helped secure Van Norman's release after negotiating for the U.S. release of Robert Thompson, a former U.S. Air Force clerk. In 1965, Thompson had confessed to having passed hundreds of photos of secret documents to the Soviet Union since 1957 while he was based in West Berlin, at the Office of Special Investigation at Tempelhof Air Base. Thompson had served in West Germany from December 1952 to December 1958.

U.S. Congressman Benjamin Gilman and an Israeli member of parliament, Shabtai Kalmanowitz, led the negotiations of the exchange and as a prelude to the release of Thompson and Norman, as well as Miron Marcus, a 24‐year‐old Israeli businessman, by the People's Republic of Mozambique. Marcus had been held in Mozambique for nineteen months after his private plane was forced down on a flight from Rhodesia to his home in South Africa. Marcus was released in April. On May 1, 1978, Norman was released by the East Germans as was Thompson. The exchange had taken place behind closed doors at the U.S. Embassy in East Germany.

In February 1986, Congressman Gilman and then-Secretary of State George Shultz were involved in negotiating the release of Soviet dissident Natan Sharansky who had been arrested in 1975 for spying on behalf of the United States and sentenced to 13 years of forced labor in 1978. Negotiations for his release were discussed between Gilman and Erich Honecker during the former's visit in January as part of a Congressional delegation. Wolfgang Vogel help negotiate Sharansky's release on February 11 along with spies Czech citizen Jaroslav Javorský and West German citizens Wolf-Georg Frohn, and Dietrich Nistroy were exchanged for Czech spies Karl Koecher and Hana Koecher held in the United States, Soviet spy Yevgeni Zemlyakov, Polish spy Marian Zacharski, and East German spy Detlef Scharfenorth (the latter three held in West Germany). The men were released in two stages, with Sharansky freed first then whisked away, accompanied by the United States Ambassador to West Germany, Richard Burt. The exchange took place on the Glienicke Bridge between West Berlin and East Germany, which had been used before for this purpose.

==== Espionage ====
From 1983 to 1988, James Hall III, a United States Army warrant officer and signals intelligence analyst stationed in Germany sold eavesdropping and code secrets to both East Germany and the Soviet Union. Hall offered his services to the Soviets back in November 1981. He was employed in early 1982 and smuggled top-secret documents out of the station to the KGB. In 1983, Hall's activities diversified when he and Hüseyin Yıldırım, a Turkish-American auto mechanic, served as Hall's courier for transporting the sensitive materials to East German agents. Yıldırım was not aware of Hall's contact with the KGB. After some time, the KGB and the Stasi realized by the identical American documents that they were being serviced by the same agent. The KGB confronted Hall during a meeting in Vienna, Austria in June 1985, and demanded that he work only for them. However, Hall opted to work for the Stasi, becoming the sole agent for the East Germans. Hall was eventually arrested on December 21, 1988, in Savannah, Georgia, after telling an undercover FBI agent that over a period of six years, he had sold Top Secret intelligence data to East Germany and the Soviet Union. At the time, Hall believed that he was speaking to a Soviet contact, and during this conversation claimed that he had been motivated only by money. Hall was convicted of espionage on July 20, 1989; he was sentenced to 40 years imprisonment, fined $50,000, ordered to forfeit all proceeds from his activities, and given a dishonorable discharge. He served his sentence at the United States Disciplinary Barracks, Fort Leavenworth, Kansas, from which he was released in September 2011 after 22 years.

Yıldırım was arrested on December 21, 1988, by the FBI as a result of the Army's investigation into Hall. Yıldırım was convicted on July 20, 1989, and sentenced to life imprisonment without the possibility of parole. Yıldırım was released from Federal Correctional Institution, Lompoc on December 29, 2003, and was extradited back to his native Turkey within the scope of a bilateral treaty on prisoner exchange between Turkey and the United States. Yıldırım arrived in Turkey on December 30 and was interrogated by the public prosecutor and put before a court in Bakırköy, Istanbul. The court sentenced him to 15 years in prison on charges of spying and two years for prison break according to the Turkish Penal Code. However, his sentence was reduced to one day in prison after deducting the years of his confinement in the United States. He spent one day at Metris Prison in Istanbul to comply with the law and was released on December 31, 2003.

On April 22, 1991, Jeffrey Carney, a U.S. Air Force intelligence specialist was captured by agents of the United States Air Force Office of Special Investigations after it had been revealed he had been working for the Stasi through declassified documents released after the fall of East Germany. Carney was working for the Stasi after he had become alienated by the policies of Ronald Reagan and the Air Force's intelligence-gathering operations. Carney was transferring U.S. Military documents while working in West Berlin. Carney was feeling isolated, alienated, under psychological stress where he felt he had no one to talk to about his problems. He also had admitted that his homosexuality was the primary reason he had become a spy with the fear of having it be discovered. Carney initially intended to defect to East Germany, but his Stasi counterparts wanted him to stay to continue to gather intelligence. After he was transferred to Goodfellow Air Force Base in 1984, Carney would travel across the world on assignments delivering documents to his Stasi handlers meeting his handlers in Mexico City and Rio de Janeiro in 1985. Feeling cut off from his supervisors in East Berlin and at increasing risk in what became known as "The Year of the Spy" he sought out the protection of the East German embassy in Mexico City. From there he was flown to Havana with the assistance of the Cuban government. Weeks later he returned to East Berlin via Prague.

Documents he handed over included intercepting and translating non-secure telephone communications of U.S. military commanders as well as the East German telephone lines dedicated to the American embassy in East Berlin. Around the same time after his transfer to Goodfellow, Carney applied for permanent asylum in East Germany and until 1990 his whereabouts had remained unknown and was carried on the rolls as a deserter. Carney had only become a person of interest after the collapse of the East German government and Stasi documents were released to the German public. Former Stasi officers turned informants help locate Carney near his apartment in Pintschstraße 12, in Friedrichshain, which was located in then-East Germany. After interrogation and being charged with espionage, conspiracy, and desertion, Carney pleaded guilty and was sentenced to thirty-eight years in prison in December 1991. Carney served the mandatory terms of his sentence at Quantico, Virginia, and later at the United States Disciplinary Barracks in Fort Leavenworth, Kansas. Carney was released in 2002, after serving 11 years, seven months, and twenty days on a twenty-year sentence in accordance with his pretrial agreement.

== See also ==
- Foreign relations of Germany
- Foreign relations of the United States
- Embassy of Germany, Washington, D.C.
- Embassy of the United States, Berlin
- Ambassadors of East Germany to the United States
- Ambassadors of the United States to East Germany
- Germany–United States relations
- East Germany–West Germany relations
- East Germany–Soviet Union relations
- United States–West Germany relations
- Soviet Union–United States relations
- Tear down this wall!
- Zschernig v. Miller
- 1958 helicopter incident
- 1964 T-39 shootdown incident
