= Harald Braun =

Harald Braun may refer to:

- Harald Braun (director)
- Harald Braun (diplomat)
