= Gerhard Herder =

German diplomat (born 1928)

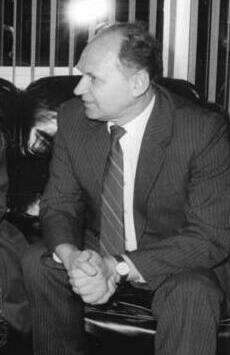
- Herder in Washington, D.C., 1988

3rd Ambassador of East Germany to the United States
- In office 12 July 1983 – 2 October 1990
- President: Erich Honecker; Egon Krenz
- Preceded by: Horst Grunert
- Succeeded by: Position abolished

Personal details
- Born: 13 August 1928 (age 96); Bagienice, Warmian-Masurian Voivodeship, East Prussia (now Poland)

Gerhard Herder (born 13 August 1928) is a former German diplomat who served as an ambassador for East Germany to Lebanon and to the United States from 1983 until 2 October 1990, following the collapse of the GDR.

== Early life ==
Herder, son of a carpenter, attended high school and earned his Abitur. Herder served as a Luftwaffenhelfer during World War II and became a prisoner of war held by the Soviet Union. He was released from captivity in 1949 and became a member of the Free German Youth (FDJ) and the Socialist Unity Party of Germany (SED). He worked as a full-time FDJ functionary and from 1953 was head of the Department of International Relations in the Central Council of the FDJ. From 1951 to 1953 he studied foreign policy and law at the German Academy of Political and Legal Sciences (DASR) in Potsdam-Babelsberg. From 1956 he worked as a research assistant at the Institute of International Law at the DASR, passed his state examination in law in 1958, and received his doctorate in law in 1961. From 1960 to 1962 Herder was a lecturer at the Institute of International Law of the DASR.

== Career ==
From 1962 he worked for the Ministry of Foreign Affairs of the GDR (MfAA) until 1963 as a deputy and then until 1965 as head of the legal and contracting department and as a scientific advisor to State Secretary Otto Winzer. From 1965 to 1967 he was head of the policy department of the MfAA. From 1968 to 1972 he headed the commercial agency in the function of a legation councilor and was ambassador to from March to November 1973 Lebanon. From 1974 to 1983 he was head of the GDR delegation to the Geneva Disarmament Committee and since 1979 at the same time Permanent Observer Mission of the GDR to the UN in New York and international organizations headquartered in Geneva.

Herder was appointed as the third and ultimately the last ambassador to the U.S. in 1983 and began serving on 12 July 1983, when he presented his credentials to President Ronald Reagan. Herder served until 2 October 1990, with accreditation to Canada where the GDR did not have a physical diplomatic presence. His tenure ended on 2 October 1990, with the completion of German reunification the following day as the GDR folded and was absorbed by the former West German government.

== Later life ==
Herder is now a pensioner and lives in Berlin.
