= 120 Wall Street =

Office skyscraper in Manhattan, New York

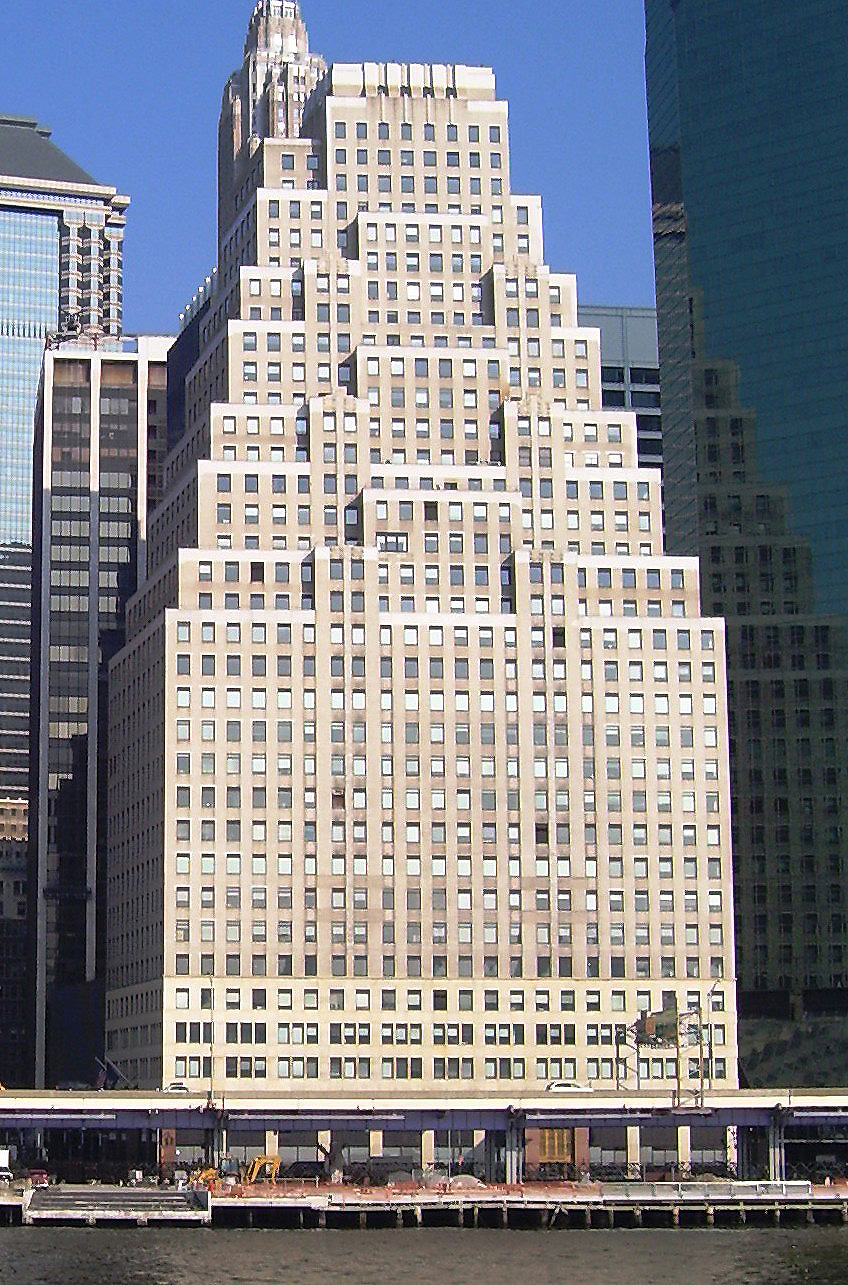
- as seen from the East River
- Interactive map of the 120 Wall Street area

General information
- Architectural style: Wedding-cake style/Стиль торта
- Location: Wall Street, 120 Wall Street, New York City, United States
- Coordinates: 40.705°N 74.006°W
- Current tenants: Concepts of Independence; Droga5; Guttmacher Institute; INROADS, NYC; Lucis Trust & World Goodwill; National Urban League; Network for Teaching Entrepreneurship; The New Press; United Negro College Fund
- Opened: March 1930; 96 years ago
- Renovated: 2002
- Cost: US$12 million (1929)
- Owner: Silverstein Properties

Height
- Height: 399 ft (122 m)

Technical details
- Floor count: 34

Design and construction
- Architect: Ely Jacques Kahn
- Architecture firm: Buchman & Kahn

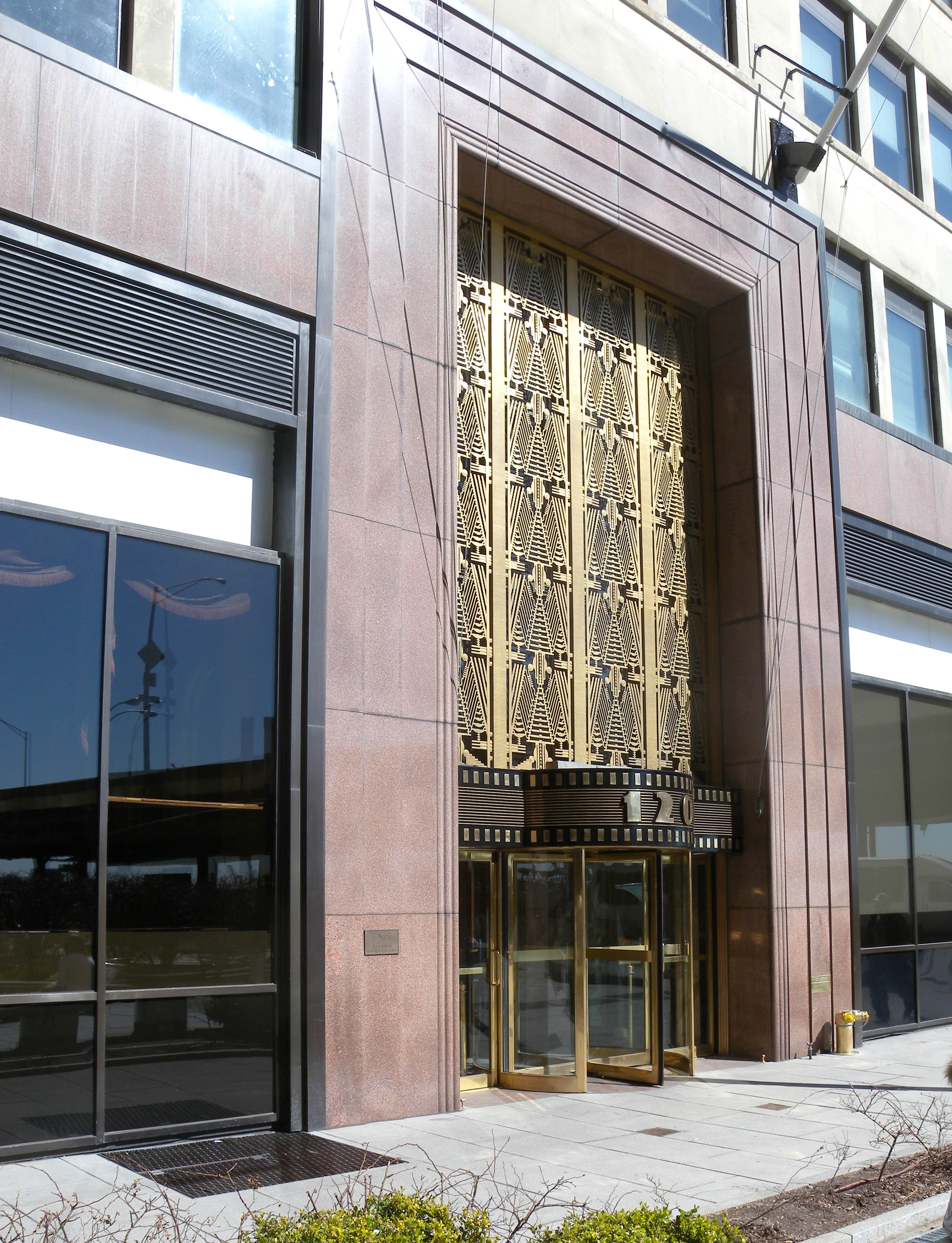
Entrance

120 Wall Street is a skyscraper in the Financial District of Lower Manhattan in New York City. It was completed in 1930. The building is 399 ft (122 m) tall, has 34 floors, and is located on the easternmost portion of Wall Street, and also borders Pine Street and South Street. The architect was Ely Jacques Kahn of Buchman & Kahn.

The tower is tiered on three sides, forming the classic wedding-cake style outline emblematic of post-1916 Zoning Resolution New York skyscrapers. The setbacks recede in shallow formations from a large 16-story platform. Red-granite panels frame wide-paned commercial windows at street level as part of the five-story limestone base.

The building has 615,000 square feet (57,100 m^{2}) of space and occupies a 23,000-square-foot (2,100 m^{2}) lot.

== History ==
Greenmal Holding Corporation (Henry Greenberg and David Malzman) acquired the site in 1928 from the American Sugar Company. In February 1929, the company obtained a $4,050,000 construction loan for the building. The cost was estimated at $12,000,000, with the edifice resting upon a 51 caisson deep foundation.

The building opened in March 1930. The original anchor tenant of the building was the American Sugar Refining Company. New York Life Insurance Company bid $1,000,000 to foreclose a $5,569,605 lien against the skyscraper at a June 26, 1933 foreclosure auction. 120 Wall Street was the only major high-rise building on the East River downtown waterfront for many years until the post-1970s construction boom.

In 1980, the 120 Wall Company, LLC, an affiliate of Silverstein Properties, acquired the building for $12 million. In 1992, in cooperation with the city's Economic Development Corporation, Silverstein Properties obtained the designation of 120 Wall Street as New York City's only Association Center. The designation creates reduced rents for not-for-profit organizations. Tenants include The New Press, AFS Intercultural Programs, the Network for Teaching Entrepreneurship, Illuminating Engineering Society of North America, Pacifica Foundation WBAI-FM, the Lucis Trust & World Goodwill, the world headquarters locations of the National Urban League, Juvenile Diabetes Research Foundation, The United Negro College Fund, the Alan Guttmacher Institute, the Center for Reproductive Rights, and Lambda Legal. Concepts of Independence, a consumer organization for the disabled, is also a tenant.

In October 2020, Wells Fargo, JP Morgan Chase and Citigroup provided a $165 million mortgage loan.
