= Wedding-cake style =

Visual style in architecture

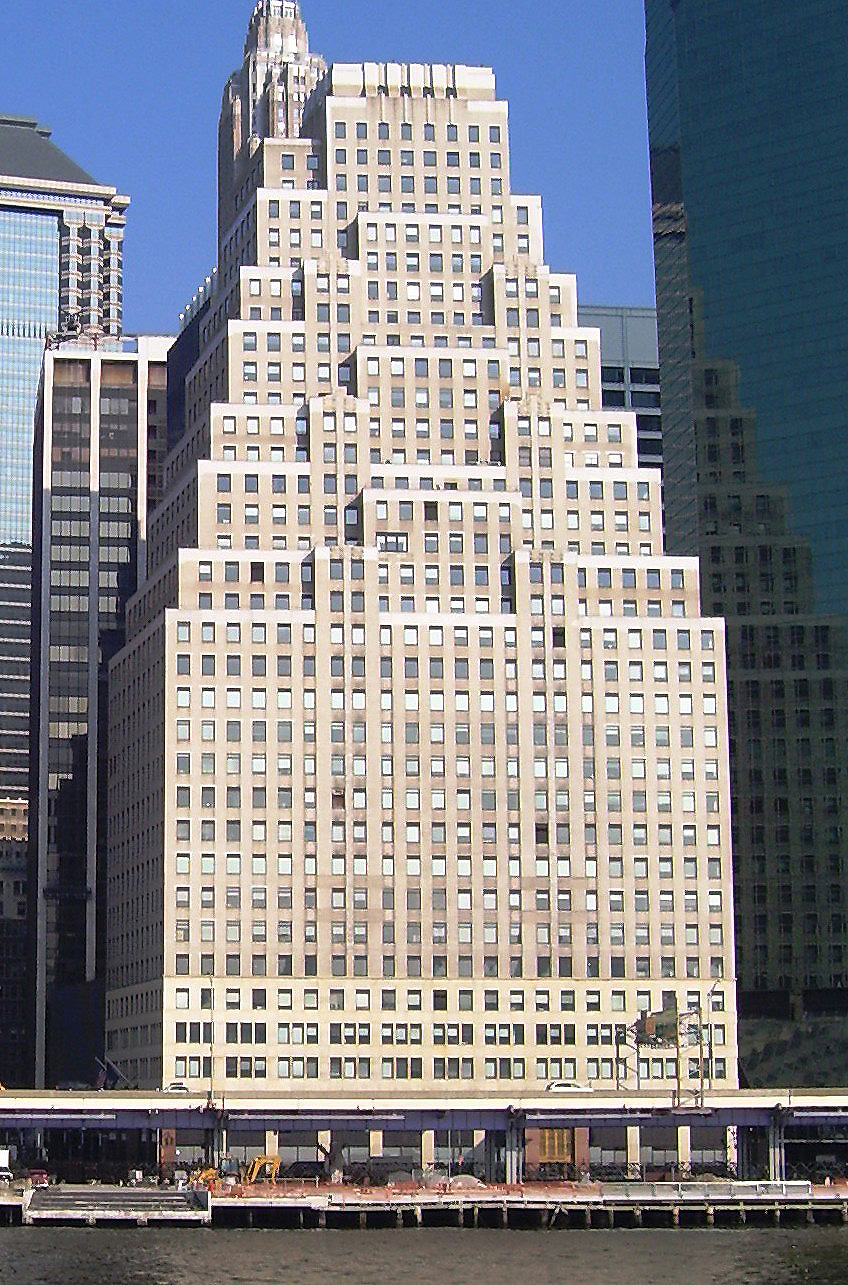
120 Wall Street in New York, a skyscraper from 1930, is an archetype of wedding-cake architecture.

In architecture, a wedding-cake style is an informal reference to buildings with many distinct tiers, each set back from the one below, resulting in a shape like a wedding cake, and may also apply to buildings that are richly ornamented, as if made in sugar icing.

- In Italy, the Monument to Vittorio Emanuele II is in wedding cake style.
- The British wedding-cake style was created by Sir Christopher Wren, who often placed a steeple at the top of a series of classically detailed diminishing lower stages as with St. Paul's Cathedral.
- In the United States, the style has been predominant in New York City, thanks to the 1916 Zoning Resolution, a former zoning code which forced buildings to reduce their shadows at street level by employing setbacks, resulting in a ziggurat profile. Many iconic New York buildings in the Art Deco style were designed to comply with these zoning regulations, and those designs were highly influential on building projects in other cities. The wedding cake design subsequently became a common feature of many Art Deco buildings around the world. The dome of the United States Capitol in Washington, D.C. is also described as being of wedding-cake style.
- In Russia, the wedding-cake style supercharged with boldly scaled classical detailing is a typical feature of Stalinist architecture.

== Wedding-cake style in the Stalinist architecture ==
=== Russia ===
The Stalinist architecture is an architectural style popular during the Soviet period from the early 1930s to the late 1950s. As wedding-cake style buildings are some of these, it was used frequently in Stalinist architecture (Russian: Сталинский стиль) in Russia. The most representative example of Russian architecture in the wedding-cake style is the large group of buildings called Vysotki or Stalinsky Vysotki (Russian: Сталинские высотки).

Nicknamed in the US: The Seven Sisters (Russian: Сталинские высотки, literally Stalin's Skyscrapers) were built from 1947 to 1953. The Seven Sisters is inspired by the Palace of the Soviets. The Palace of the Soviets was planned to be built in the early 1930s on the banks of the Moscow River, where the Cathedral was located, but the plan was aborted. The Seven Sisters were initially planned to have eight structures after World War II, but the eighth wasn't built.

The wedding-cake style in Stalinist architecture is characterized by tiered construction and towering buildings towards the center. It is also decorated with classical-style sculptures and sculptures of Soviet symbols. At Stalin's suggestion, a spire, which is made of metal and glass, was added. This Stalinist wedding-cake style is an attempt to distinguish it from American buildings of the 1930s. 17th-century Russian architecture and Gothic religious buildings influenced the overall exterior decoration of wedding-cake style architecture in Russia.

The seven sisters include:

- The Kotelnicheskaya Embankment Building.
- The Krasnoselsky District Red Gate Building.
- The Ministry of Foreign Affairs of Russia main building.
- The Hotel Ukraina.
- The Kudrinskaya Square Building.
- The Leningradskaya Hotel.
- The main building of Moscow State University.
The Seven Sisters

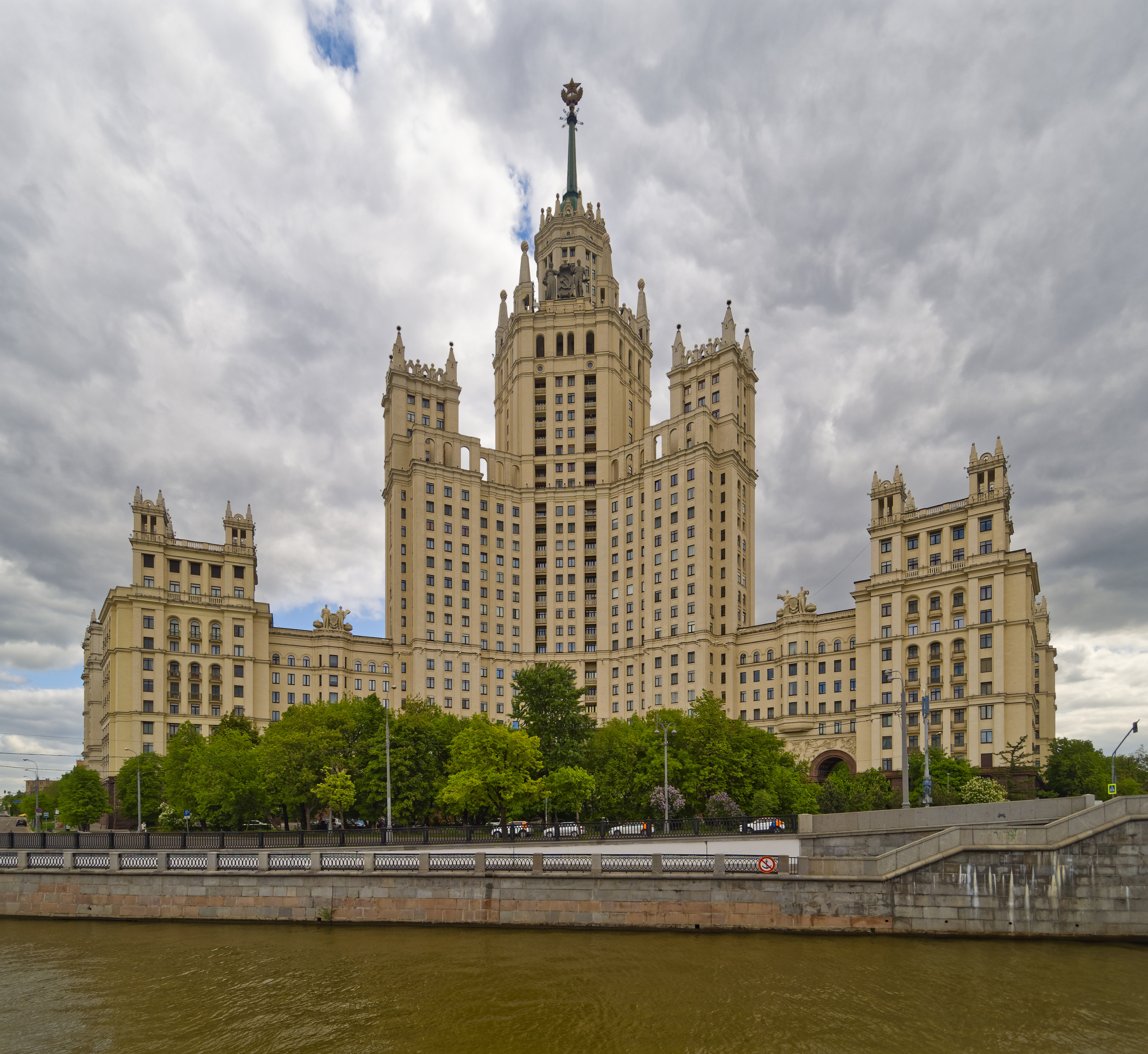
The Kotelnicheskaya Embankment Building.

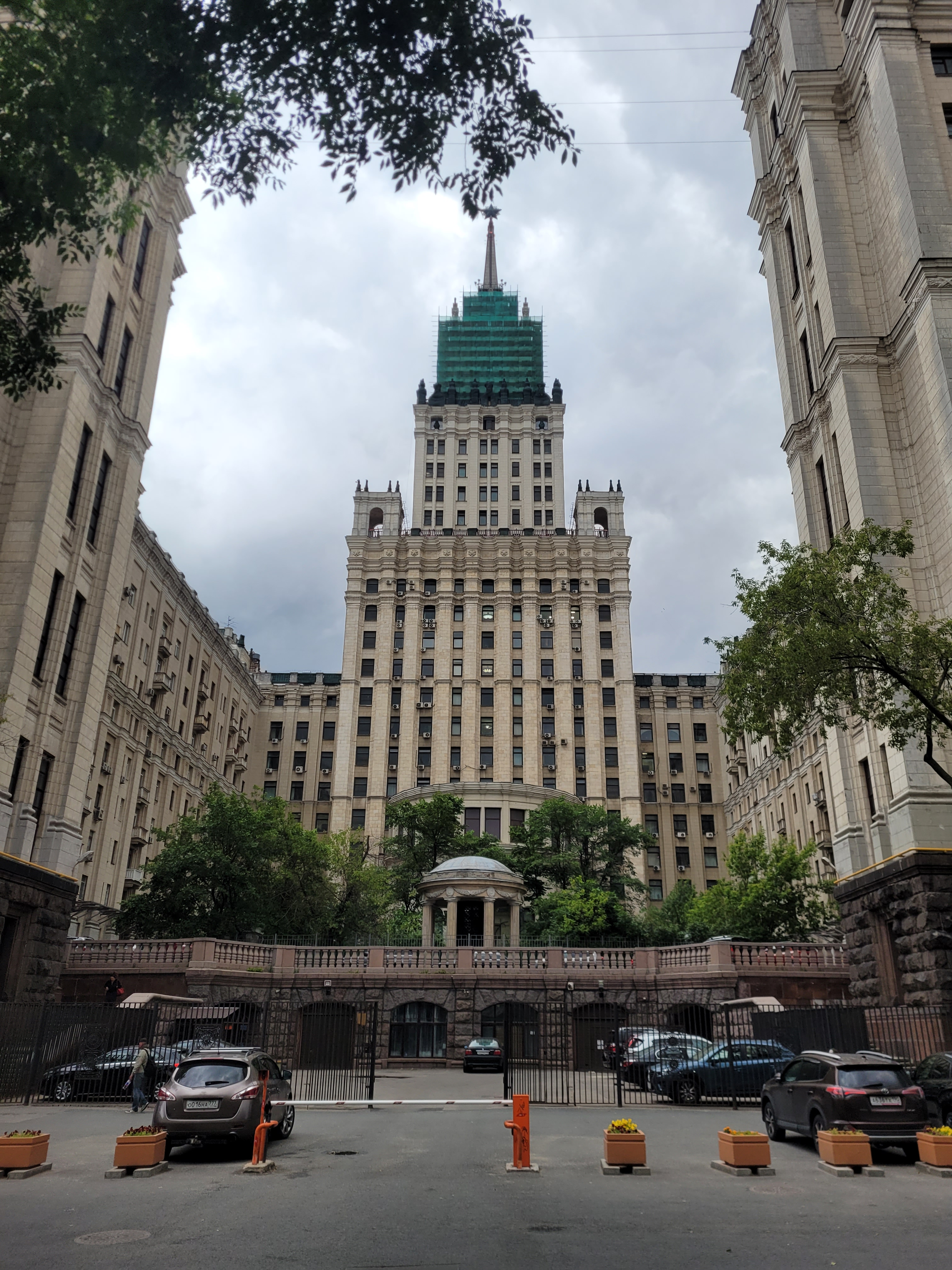
The Krasnoselsky District Red Gate Building.

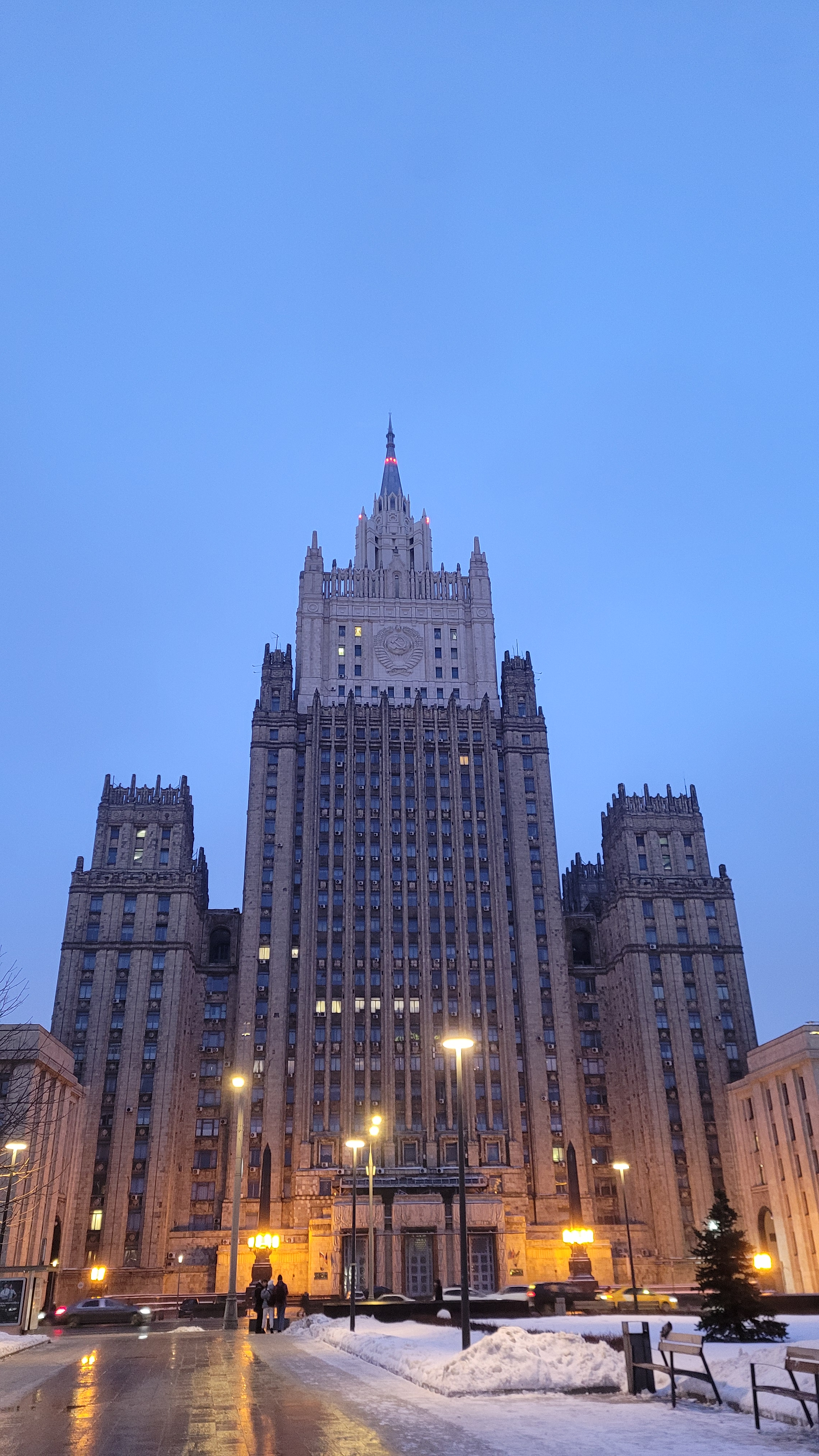
The Ministry of Foreign Affairs of Russia main building.

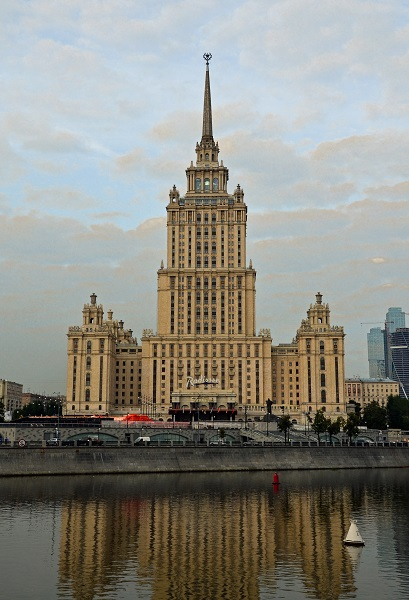
The Hotel Ukraina.

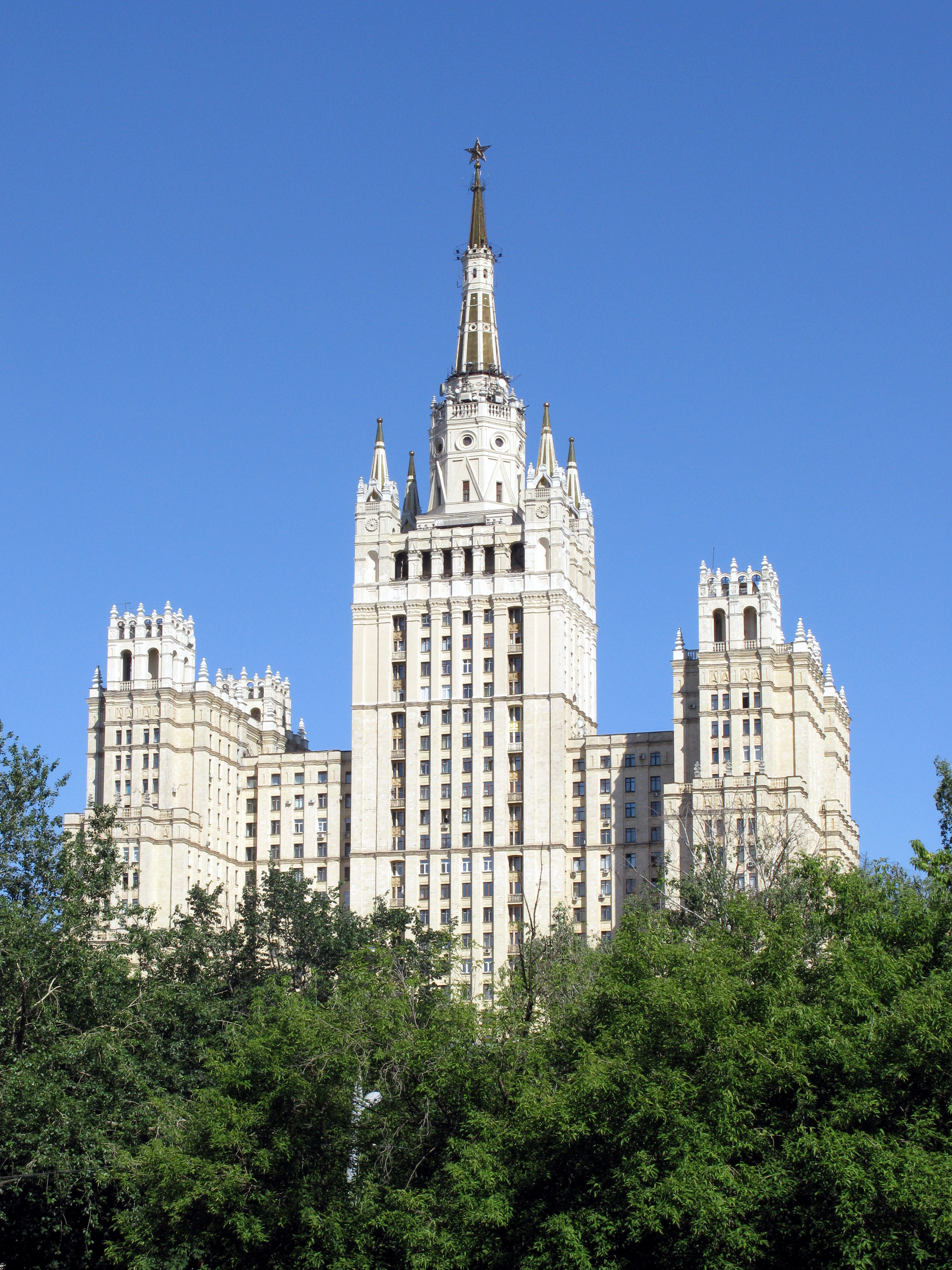
The Kudrinskaya Square Building.

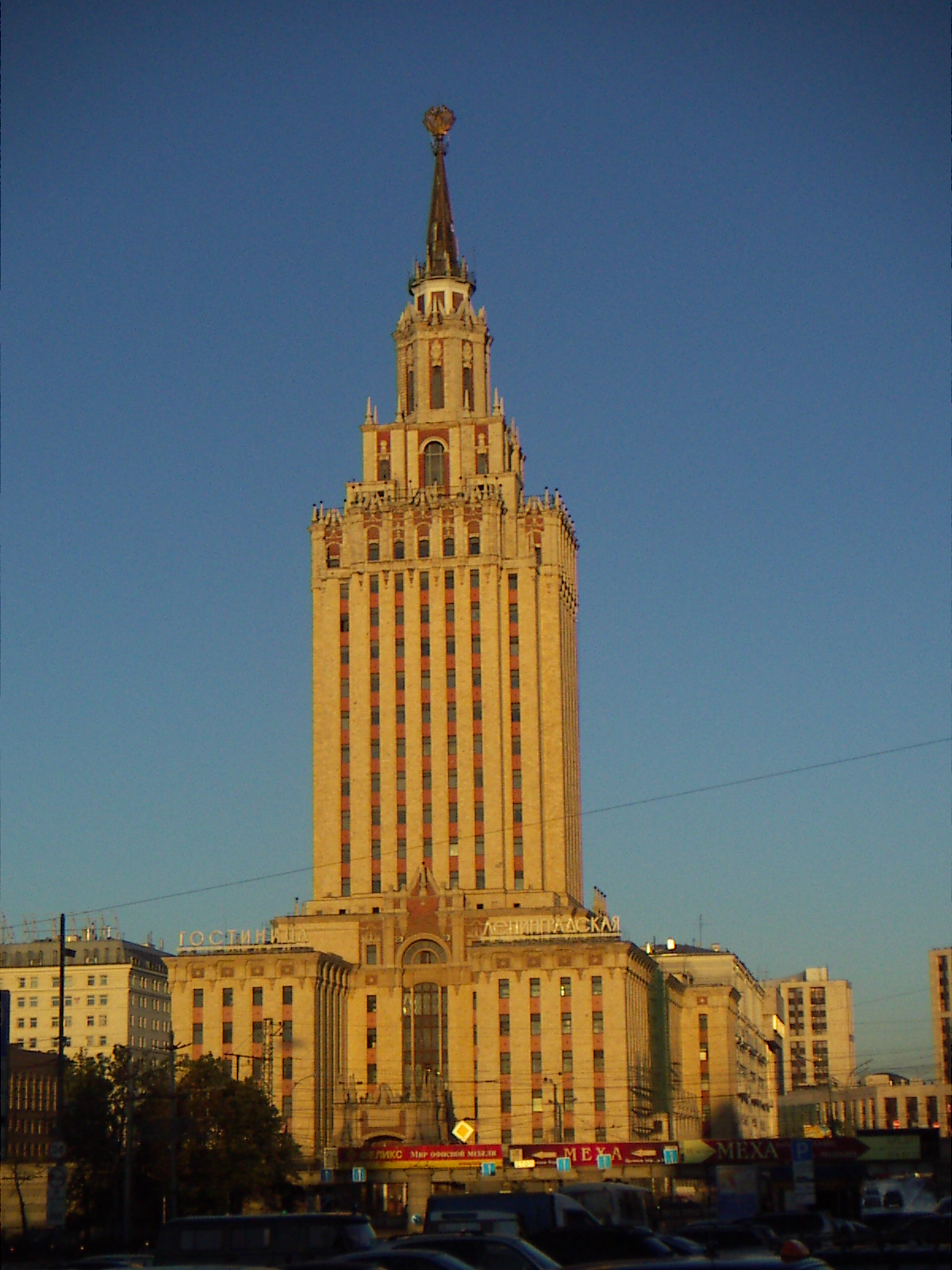
The Leningradskaya Hotel.

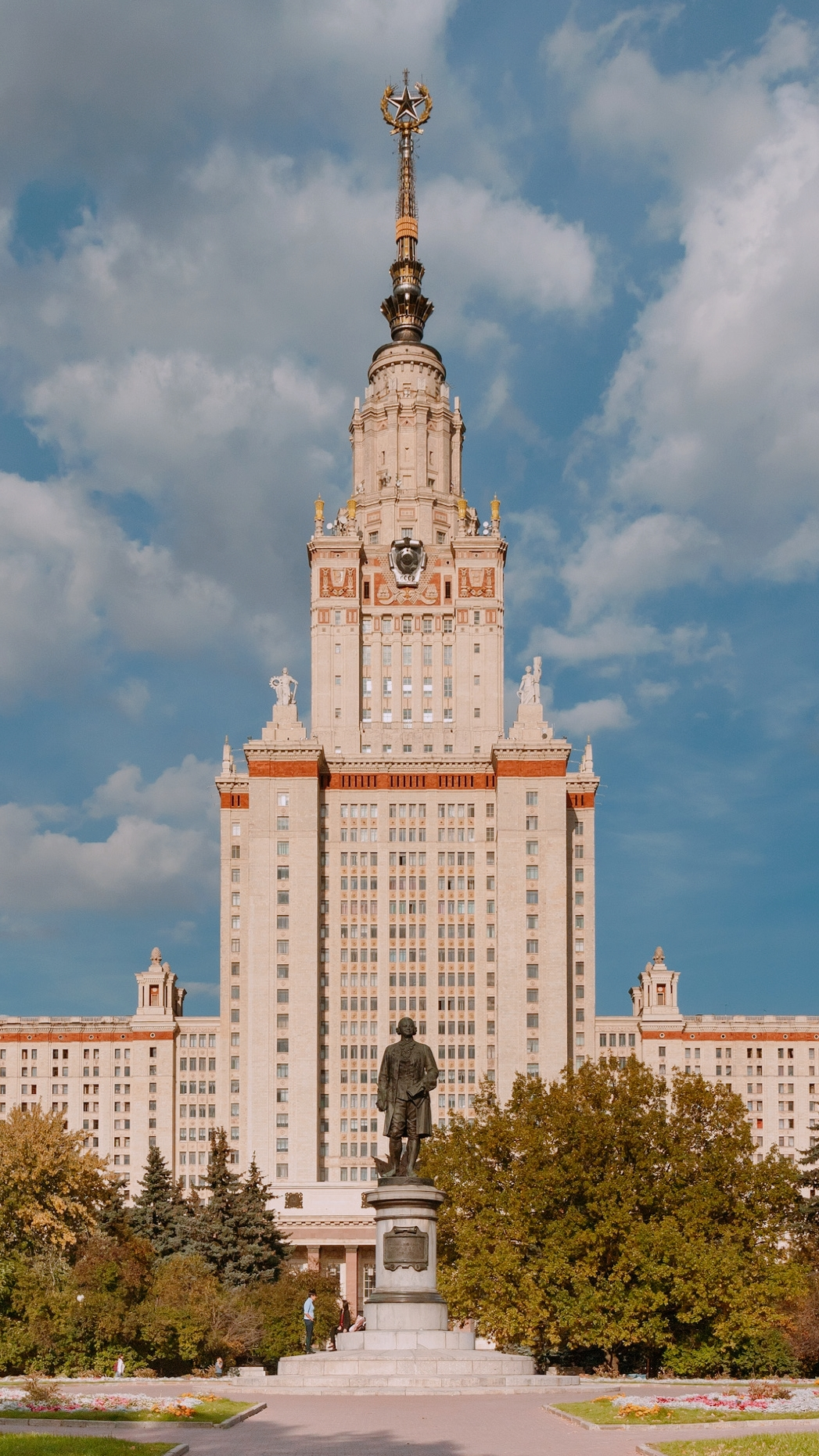
The main building of Moscow State University.

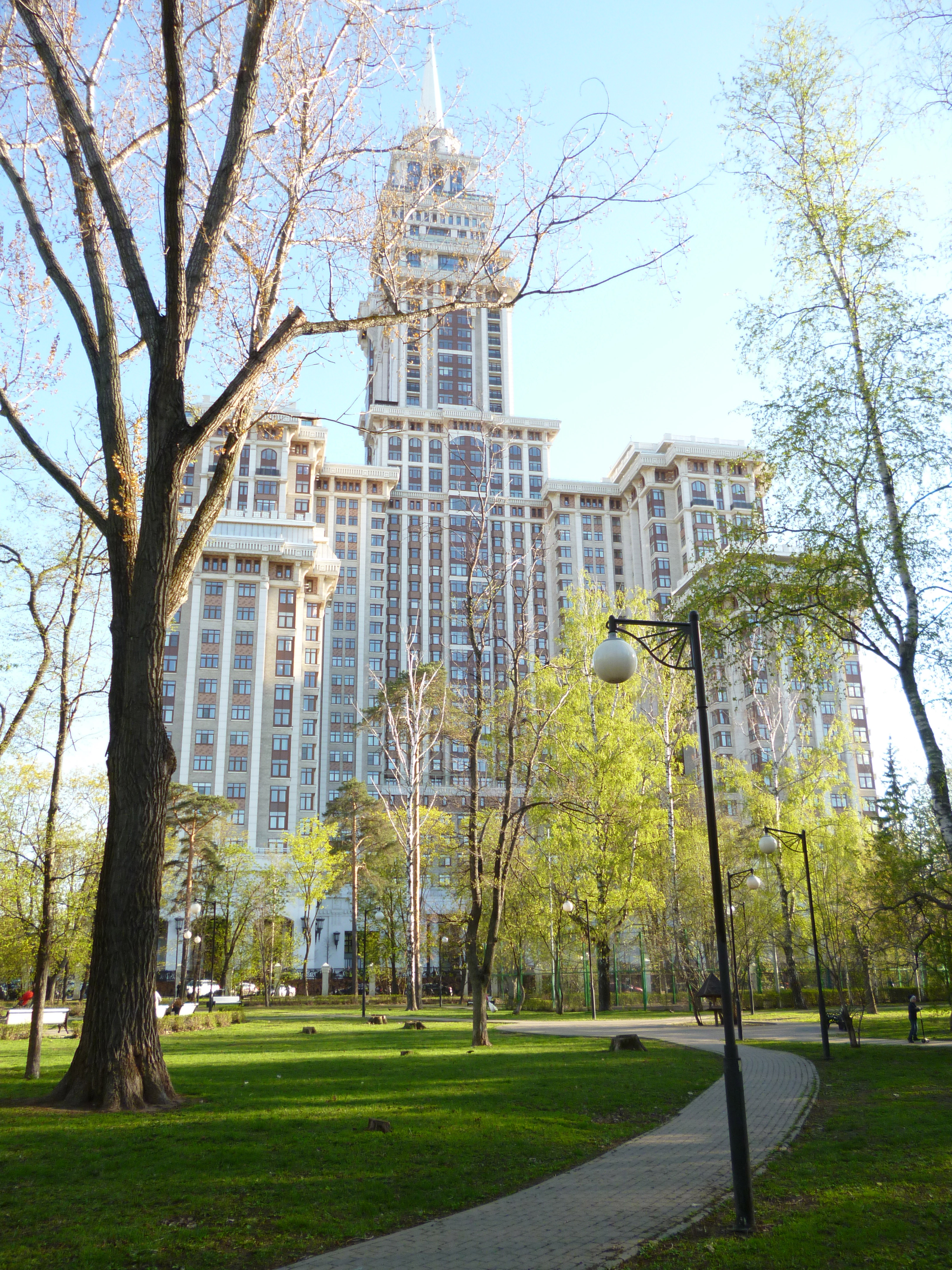
The Triumph Palace

At the beginning of the 21st century, there were signs of a revival of the Stalinist wedding-cake style of architecture, driven by the resentment over the decline of the Soviet Union and its failure to achieve prosperity despite the cultural influx from other capitalist countries. A building that exemplifies this aspect is the Triumph Palace in Moscow. Triumph Palace, people call it the Eighth Sisters following the Seven sisters, it is an ultra-large apartment complex with various luxurious facilities. Construction began in 2001 and was completed in 2006.

=== Germany ===
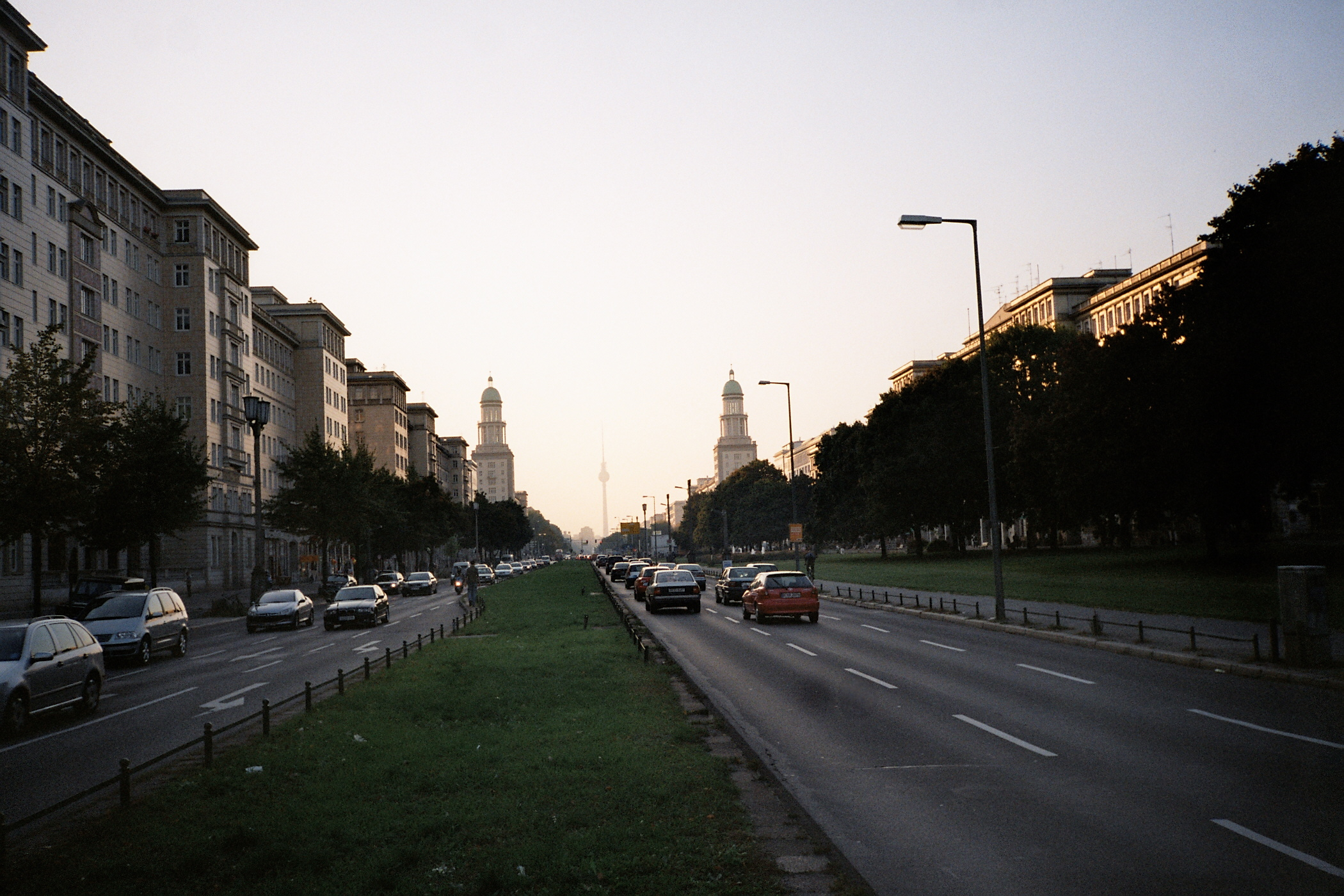
Karl-Marx-Allee Berlin

The German Democratic Republic (German: Deutsche Demokratische Republik, commonly known as DDR (GDR) and informally as East Germany or Ostdeutschland) was founded in 1949. After World War II, according to the Berlin Declaration and The Potsdam Agreement, Germany's eastern territories were Soviet-occupied zones by the Soviet Union. Until German unification on October 3, 1990, the GDR interacted with the Soviet Union closely. GDR was greatly influenced politically and economically by the Soviet Union. With this background, the GDR adopted this style as part of its reconstruction program after World War II. This Stalinist (German: sozialistischen Klassizismus, literally socialist classicism) wedding-cake style architecture was also given name Zuckerbäckerstil (English: patisserie style) in Germany as a derogatory tone. In particular, These patisserie-style (or also called wedding cake-style) buildings were built along Karl Marx-Allee (English: Karl Marx Avenue), which was part of Post-War Reconstruction in East Germany.
