= Christoph Heusgen =

German diplomat

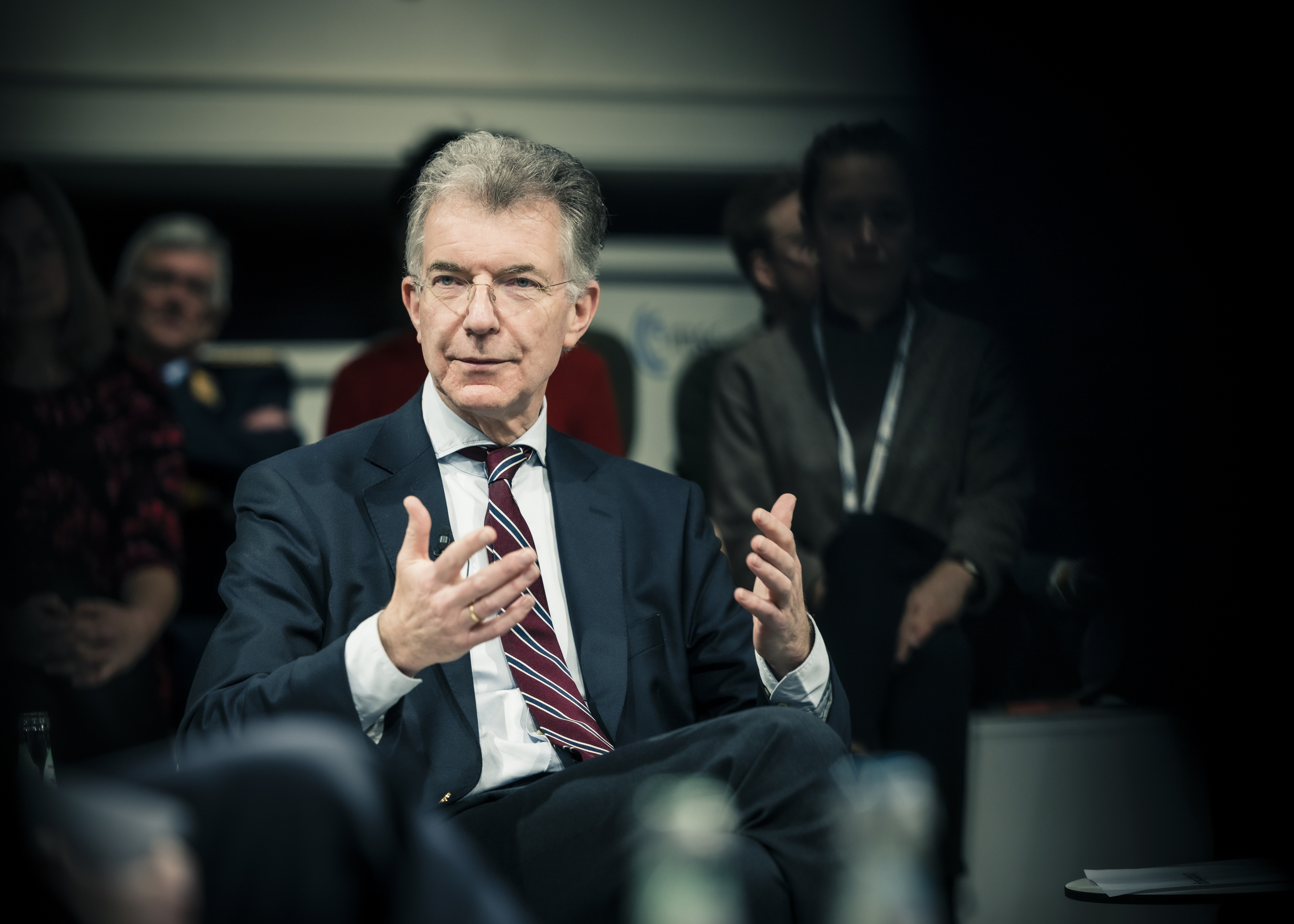
Heusgen in 2023

Christoph Heusgen (born 17 March 1955) is a German diplomat who has served as chairman of the Munich Security Conference from 2022 to 2025.

Heusgen served as German Ambassador to the United Nations in New York from 2017 to 2021. He was Under-Secretary for Foreign and Security Policy in the German Chancellery from 2005 to 2017, and described as Angela Merkel's most influential foreign policy and security adviser. During Germany's tenure as a non-permanent member of the United Nations Security Council, Heusgen served as President of the Council in April 2019 and assumed the presidency again in July 2020, with his term ending in December 2020.

== Early life and education ==
The son of pharmacists, Heusgen grew up in Neuss where he graduated from Quirinus-Gymnasium in 1973. During his high school years, he spent a year as an exchange student at Western Reserve Academy, a boarding school in Hudson, Ohio. Heusgen studied in St. Gallen, at Georgia Southern University (GSU) and at Panthéon-Assas University in Paris, and obtained a doctorate from the University of St. Gallen in 1980. Heusgen also enjoyed watching football, stating that he was a fan of FC Bayern Munich.

== Career ==
=== Career in the diplomatic service ===
Heusgen joined the diplomatic service of West Germany in 1980. His first posting was in the press and economic affairs at the Consulate General in Chicago from 1983 to 1986. He served at the German Embassy in Paris until 1988, before returning to the Federal Foreign Office headquarters in Bonn, where he took on the role of Private Secretary to the Coordinator for German-French Relations Rainer Barzel from 1988 to 1990. Heusgen also held the positions of Deputy Head of the special section in charge of negotiations of the Treaty of Maastricht (1990–1992), Deputy Head in charge of European Affairs in the private office of Foreign Minister Klaus Kinkel (1993–1997).

Heusgen was later appointed Director of the Policy Unit of the High Representative Javier Solana in the General Secretariat of the Council of the European Union in Brussels from 1999 to 2005. During that time, together with Robert Cooper, he notably led efforts on drafting the first-ever European Security Strategy in 2003.

=== Chief foreign policy advisor to the Chancellor, 2005–2017 ===
In 2005 Heusgen became Under-Secretary for Foreign and Security Policy in the German Chancellery. In this capacity, he served as chief advisor on foreign and security policy to Chancellor Angela Merkel. By the end of his term, he was the longest-serving official in this position. He was succeeded in 2017 by Jan Hecker, a former judge at the Federal Administrative Court.

=== Ambassador to the United Nations, 2017–2021 ===
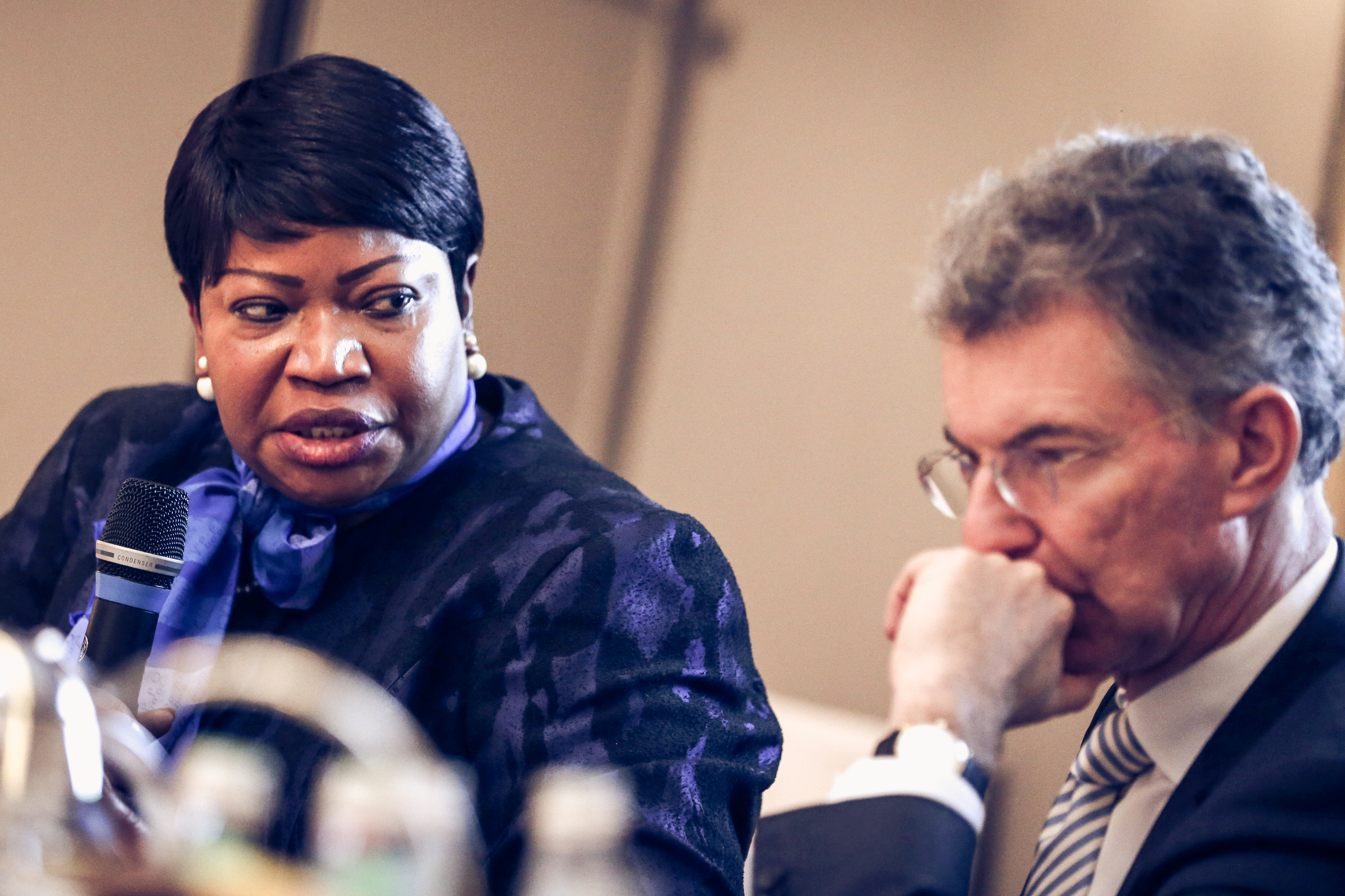
Heusgen and Fatou Bensouda in February 2019

In November 2016 it became known that Heusgen would succeed Harald Braun as Permanent Representative of Germany to the United Nations in New York in 2017. In that capacity, he led the country's campaign for the United Nations Security Council election in 2018. He subsequently served as the President of the United Nations Security Council in April 2019 and took up the post again in July 2020 when Germany assumed the Presidency once more.

During his time as chair of the Security Council, Heusgen notably led negotiations in July 2020 on extending aid deliveries to Syria for one year. Opposition from both Russia and China caused the council to agree on only one remaining Turkey border crossing. At the time, he told his Chinese and Russian counterparts to report to their capitals that he had asked, "How those people who gave the instructions to cut off the aid of 500,000 children... are ready to look into the mirror tomorrow."

In a programmatic announcement 2018, Heusgen criticized the Trump administration's withdrawal from multilateral formats and its increasingly-unilateral approach, which created "noticeable uncertainty in the UN system."

On 6 October 2020, Heusgen delivered a statement, on behalf of the group of 39 countries, including Germany, the United Kingdom and the United States, that denounced China for its treatment of ethnic minorities in Xinjiang and for its curtailing of freedoms in Hong Kong. Later that month, Heusgen appealed to China to release the former diplomat Michael Kovrig, who has been detained by China since 2018. Heusgen used his last scheduled UN Security Council session, whose official agenda topic was Iran, to call again on China to release Kovrig and the consultant Michael Spavor, who had likewise been detained in 2018. Chinese Deputy Ambassador Geng Shuang bluntly dismissed the appeal.

=== Chairman of Munich Security Conference ===
In 2022 he succeeded Wolfgang Ischinger, chairman of the Munich Security Conference.

== Positions ==
In June 2022, he called former Russian President Dmitry Medvedev "a clown". Heusgen called for the delivery of German Leopard main battle tanks to Ukraine at the end of 2022.

In October 2023 Christoph Heusgen expressed concern that an Israeli ground offensive in Gaza could further worsen the humanitarian and political situation. He warned of the danger of a wildfire. He called for a two-state solution. In an interview with ZDF he used the term "Hamas action" for the 7 October attacks, for which he was criticized by Israel's ambassador to Germany, Ron Prosor, who referred to Heusgen's comments as "outrageous" and a trivialization of the attacks; Heusgen later expressed regret for this. In other interviews Heusgen condemned the attack and called for solidarity with Israel and military support. In an interview with Berliner Zeitung in September 2025, Heusgen warned that Germany risked being convicted of complicity in genocide in Gaza due to its supply of weapons to Israel, and called on the German government to recognize the State of Palestine.

== Other activities ==
=== Corporate boards ===
- Bosch, Member of the International Advisory Committee (since 2022)

=== Non-profit organizations ===
- European Council on Foreign Relations (ECFR), Member (since 2021)
- Dag Hammarskjöld Fund for Journalists, Member of the Honorary Advisory Council (since 2017)
- International Gender Champions (IGC), Member
- International Peace Institute (IPI), Member of the International Advisory Council
- German Institute for International and Security Affairs (SWP), Member of the council (2005–2017)

== Recognition ==
- 2006 – Grand Decoration of Honour in Gold for Services to the Republic of Austria
- 2009 – Order of Prince Henry
- 2015 – Badge of Honour of the Bundeswehr in Gold (awarded by Federal Minister of Defence Ursula von der Leyen)

== Personal life ==
Heusgen is married to fellow career diplomat Ina Heusgen, and has four children. He is a fan of FC Bayern Munich and in his free time he runs marathons. During his time at the Chancellery, he regularly invited foreign ambassadors to the Neuss Schützenfest in his hometown, including Phil Murphy in 2012, Simon McDonald in 2014, Philippe Étienne in 2015 and John B. Emerson in 2016.

== Criticisms ==
In 2017, the German tabloid Bild spread leaked information from Russian hacker group Fancy Bear, believed to be linked to Russian intelligence agency GRU, who had hacked into the United Nations' email system and obtained Heusgen's correspondences, including one which suggested that he helped his wife get a job at the UN. Journalists familiar with the issue of working couples reported that it is not uncommon for both partners to seek employment.

In 2019, the Simon Wiesenthal Center included Heusgen on their list of the year's 10 worst acts of antisemitism, due to a comparison he had made between rocket attacks by Hamas on Israel and the construction of illegal Israeli settlements, as well as his supposed "anti-Israel voting record" at the UN. Bild "accused Heusgen in an editorial of 'pure malice' against the Jewish state." The Wiesenthal Center further added that Heusgen "equated 130 rockets fired by terrorist Hamas at Israeli civilians in one week in March with the Jewish state's demolition of terrorists' homes". The accusation was refuted by the Chancellor Angela Merkel before the Bundestag, as well by several members of the German Government, including Andreas Michaelis, then State Secretary at the Federal Foreign Office. Michaelis, Germany's former Ambassador to Israel, urged the Wiesenthal Center to remove Heusgen from the list, calling his inclusion "a big mistake" which "misses the mark and targets an honorable friend of Israel"; the Wiesenthal Center rejected doing so. Israel's Ambassador to Germany Jeremy Issacharoff also defended Heusgen, saying the accusation was "completely inappropriate." The German Foreign Office pointed to Heusgen's long track record of supporting Israel's security.
