= East Germany–Pakistan relations =

- East Germany: Pakistan

East Germany–Pakistan relations (German: Ostdeutsch-pakistanische Beziehungen) refers to historical foreign and bilateral relations between German Democratic Republic (East Germany) and State of Pakistan. The relations were established in the 1950s but remained hostile throughout the cold war.

During its existence, the East Germany had been even more dependent on the USSR's guidelines for its foreign policy and did not develop any independent concept. In the 1960s, the relations deteriorated when Pakistan's role was revealed in a notorious incident in the Soviet Union, though the relations with West Germany further grew. Both, East and West German foreign policy was tilted towards India as the largest country with the largest economy and maybe also because of the mentioned historical traditions idealizing India. In addition, East Germany had a preference for India because of India's attachment to the Soviet Union through the treaty of friendship and mutual cooperation concluded in 1972. Although, East Germany retained neutrality policy during the 1971 war of India and Pakistan; East Germany became the third country in the world, and the first country in Europe, to officially recognized Bangladesh in 1972 after its succeeded independence in 1971. In addition, East Germany supported the USSR and Afghanistan during the Soviet–Afghan War in the 1980s, whereas Pakistan supported the opposing mujahideen rebels.

Furthermore, East Germany viewed Pakistan as a United States ally and therefore had a low priority in its foreign relations. On other the hand, the West Germany idealized Pakistan as an example of successful development policy in third world country.
