= Gunter Pleuger =

German diplomat and politician

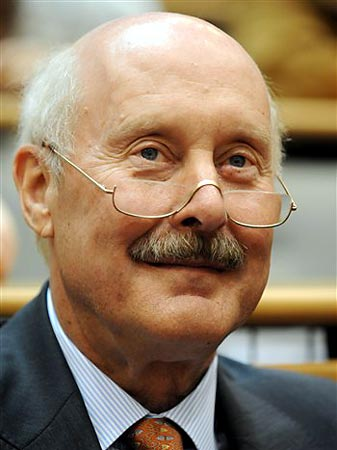
Pleuger

Gunter Pleuger (born 25 March 1941 in Wismar, Germany) is a German diplomat and politician.

He studied in politics and law in Bonn, and subsequently Cologne.

From 11 November 2002 to 2006, Pleuger was the German ambassador to the United Nations. He was succeeded by Thomas Matusek. Since 1 October 2008, he has acted as president of the Viadrina European University in Frankfurt (Oder).
