= Horst Grunert =

German diplomat

2nd Ambassador of East Germany to the United States
- In office 2 October 1978 – 1983
- President: Erich Honecker
- Preceded by: Rolf Sieber
- Succeeded by: Gerhard Herder

Personal details
- Born: April 10, 1928
- Died: September 19, 2005 (aged 77)

Horst Grunert (April 10, 1928 – September 19, 2005) was a German diplomat who served as the second Ambassador of East Germany to the United States from 1978 to 1983 and as ambassador to Austria from 1983 to 1986.

== Early life ==
Grunert was born into a working-class family and was called upon as a Luftwaffenhelfer during World War II between 1944 and 1945 after graduating from high school. After the war, Grunert trained as Neulehrer and worked as a history teacher in the district of Perleberg. From 1950 to 1951 he attended a course at the party college of the Socialist Unity Party of Germany (SED).

== Career ==
In 1951 he was an employee in the Ministry of Foreign Affairs of the GDR (MfAA). In 1953 he was appointed as the Second Secretary at the Embassy in Warsaw, Poland serving in the position until 1956. From 1956 to 1957 he was the Second Secretary at the Commercial Representation in Finland. In a distance learning course from 1955 to 1958 at the German Academy of Political Science and Law in Potsdam-Babelsberg, he obtained a degree in political science. From 1958 to 1961 he headed the office of Foreign Minister Lothar Bolz and from 1961 to 1962 he was an employee in the Representation of the Chamber of Foreign Trade in the United Kingdom. From 1963 to 1965 he was head of the Cultural Department of the MfAA, from 1965 to 1968 he was the Consul General in Syria.

In 1971 Grunert received his doctorate as Dr. rer. and worked from 1968 to 1972 as the Director of the Center for Information and Documentation of the MfAA. From 1972 to 1973 he was head of the Permanent Observer Mission of the GDR to the UN in New York. From 1974 to 1978 Grunert was the Deputy Secretary of State.

Grunert was appointed as the second ambassador of East Germany to the United States in 1978 succeeding Rolf Sieber. He presented his credentials on October 2 to President Jimmy Carter. Grunert served until 1983 with accreditation to Canada where the GDR did not have a physical diplomatic presence. He was succeeded by Gerhard Herder. From 1983 to 1986 he was the ambassador to Austria.

== Later life ==
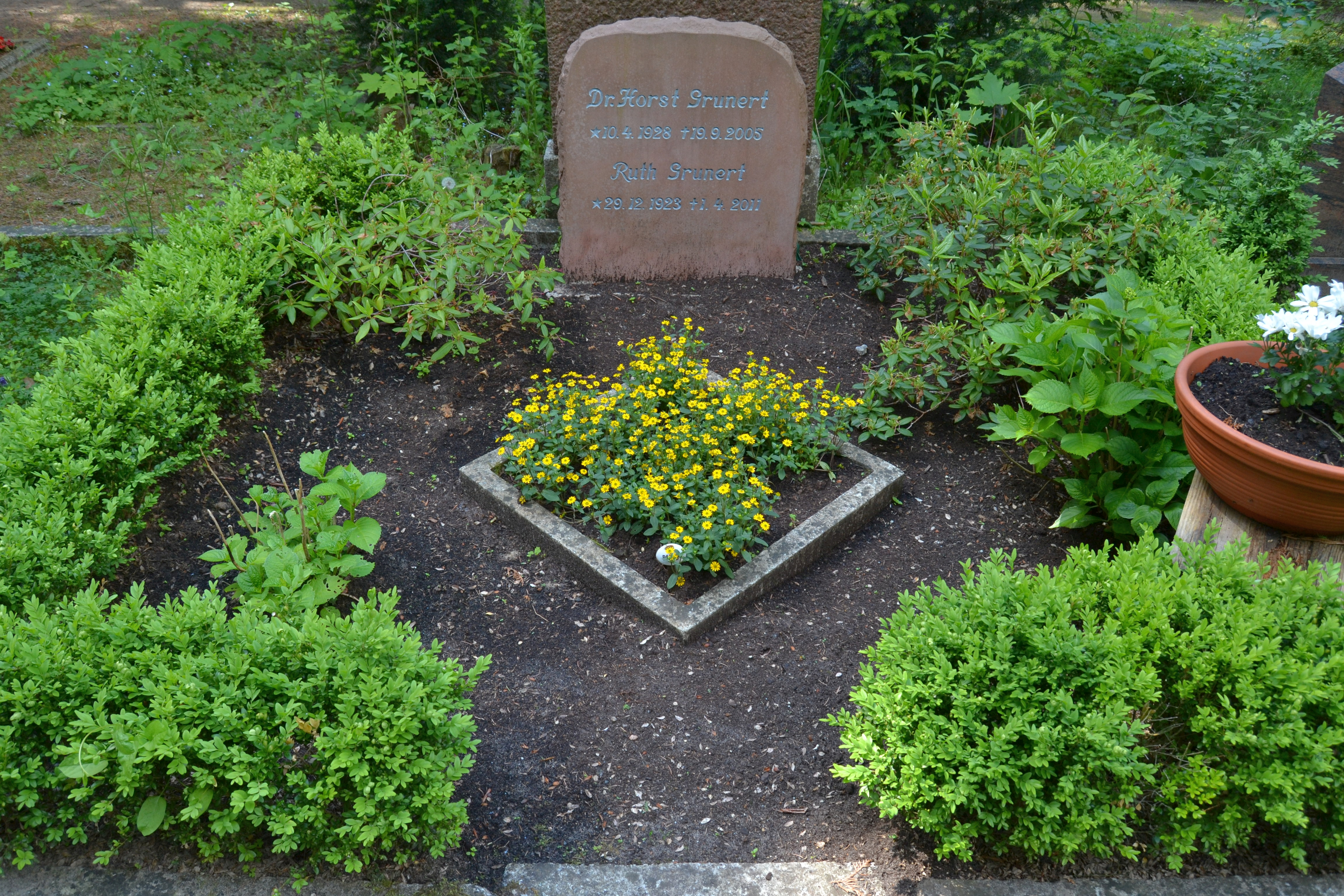
Grunert's grave in the municipal cemetery of Schöneiche.

From 1986 to 1990 Grunert was a professor at the Institute for International Relations at the German Academy of Political Science and Law in Potsdam-Babelsberg and in 1990 became president of the League for Friendship of Peoples of the GDR.

Grunert died in 2005 at the age of 76.
