= List of ambassadors of East Germany to the United States =

Ambassador of East Germany to the United States
- Incumbent; None
- Inaugural holder: Rolf Sieber
- Formation: November 1974
- Abolished: October 2, 1990

East Germany had diplomatic relations with the United States from 1974 to 1990. From 1975 the GDR's ambassadors to the U.S. were also accredited to Canada, until 1987 when East Germany opened an embassy in Ottawa.

Listed below are the head East German diplomatic agents to the United States, their diplomatic rank, and the effective start and end of their service in the United States.

== List of East German ambassadors to the United States (1974–1990) ==
Name and title	Portrait	Presentation of credentials	Termination of mission
Rolf Sieber, Ambassador		December 11, 1974	1978
Horst Grunert, Ambassador		October 2, 1978	1983
Gerhard Herder, Ambassador		July 12, 1983	October 2, 1990

== See also ==
- East Germany–United States relations
- Embassy of the United States, Berlin
- Embassy of Germany, Washington, D.C.
- Ambassadors of the United States to East Germany
- Germany–United States relations
- Ambassadors of Germany to the United States
- Ambassadors of the United States to Germany
