= Antje Leendertse =

German diplomat (born 1963)

Antje Leendertse (born March 7, 1963) is a German diplomat. Since September 2025, she has served as the Permanent Representative of Germany to the United Nations in Geneva, a position she previously held from February 2017 to April 2018. Prior to that, she served as Permanent Representative of Germany to the United Nations in New York from September 2021 to August 2025, as Political Director at the Federal Foreign Office from April 2018 to February 2019, and subsequently as State Secretary at the Federal Foreign Office under Minister Heiko Maas until mid-2021.

== Career ==
Leendertse began her preparatory service for the higher foreign service in 1990 and joined the Federal Foreign Office after completing it in 1992. After working in the Department for Mediterranean Countries in the Political Division of the Federal Foreign Office, she worked at the Embassy in Russia from 1993 to 1997 and in the United Nations Policy Division at the Federal Foreign Office from 1997 to 1999. She then worked in the Press Division of the Federal Foreign Office from 1999 to 2005, where she was deputy spokesperson from 2002 to 2005. After a subsequent posting at the Embassy in the United Kingdom from 2005 to 2006 and a year's parental leave, she served as Permanent Representative of the Ambassador to Finland from 2007 to 2009.

After her return, she was Head of Division for the Western Balkans at the Federal Foreign Office from 2009 to 2012 and then Commissioner for Eastern Europe, the Caucasus and Central Asia at the Federal Foreign Office from 2012 to March 2014. From March 2014 to March 2015, Leendertse was Federal Government Commissioner for Disarmament and Arms Control at the Federal Foreign Office. She was then Deputy to the Special Representative of the Federal Government for the OSCE Chairmanship Gernot Erler and Head of the OSCE Chairmanship Task Force 2016. From February 2017 to April 2018, Leendertse was Ambassador and Permanent Representative of the Federal Republic of Germany to the United Nations Office and other international organizations in Geneva.

Foreign Minister Heiko Maas appointed Leendertse as the new Political Director at the Federal Foreign Office in April 2018. She succeeded Andreas Michaelis, who was promoted to State Secretary. Just under a year later, she was appointed Permanent State Secretary, succeeding Walter Johannes Lindner, who became Ambassador to India, on March 22, 2019.

In the summer of 2021, Leendertse was criticized for dismissing and downplaying urgent warnings from the German embassy in Afghanistan that Kabul would soon fall as the Taliban advanced, supposedly in the (ultimately futile) hope of delaying the fall of the city until after the 2021 federal election.

From September 2021 to August 2025, Leendertse served as Germany’s Permanent Representative to the United Nations in New York City. Since September 2025, she has been the head of the Permanent Mission of the Federal Republic of Germany to the United Nations in Geneva.

== Positions ==
Leendertse is a member of the International Gender Champions, which promotes gender equality in national and international organizations.
