= Inroads (organization) =

INROADS is a non-profit organization founded in 1970 by Frank C. Carr to fix the lack of ethnic diversity in corporate America. INROADS launched with only 25 interns working at 17 sponsoring corporations in the Chicago area. Since then, INROADS has expanded to become an international organization serving nearly 2,000 interns annually at over 200 sponsoring corporations. The organization is now based in St. Louis, Missouri.

== Qualifications ==
INROADS is open to graduating high school seniors and college students with two or more years left before they graduate from college. A student must have a GPA of 3.0 or better if in college. If the student is a senior in high school, they may qualify with a GPA of 3.0 or better and have either an ACT score of 20 or better, SAT score of 1000 or better, or be ranked in the top ten percent of their graduating class. These qualifications may vary by an affiliate, however.

== Internships ==
All the internships offered through INROADS are paid internships though the actual rate of pay varies from company to company. Also in addition to working at the sponsoring company, INROADS interns are required to attend training sessions hosted by INROADS to teach interns business skills. Some of the many sponsoring companies are Texas Instruments, Boeing, TD Bank Financial Group, Regions Bank, Liberty Mutual Insurance, Travelers Insurance, Target, MetLife, Pfizer, Google, Deloitte, PricewaterhouseCoopers, RBC Capital Markets, Sunoco Inc, KPMG, Bridgestone/Firestone, Allstate Insurance, Johnson and Johnson, Coca-Cola, PECO, Vanguard, United Health Group, United Technologies and Kraft.
