= Rolf Sieber =

German university rector, diplomat, and politician (1929–2020)

1st Ambassador of East Germany to the United States
- In office 11 December 1974 – 1978
- President: Erich Honecker
- Preceded by: Position established
- Succeeded by: Horst Grunert

Personal details
- Born: December 10, 1929; Lunzenau, Mittelsachsen, Weimar Republic (now Germany)
- Died: July 26, 2020 (aged 90)

Rolf Sieber (December 10, 1929 – July 26, 2020) was a German politician, diplomat, and rector who served as the first Ambassador of East Germany to the United States from 1974 to 1978. He was the rector of Berlin School of Economics and Law from 1979 to 1988. Prior to his appointment and while serving as ambassador, he was a member of the Volkskammer from 1963 to 1976.

== Early life ==
Sieber was born in Lunzenau, Mittelsachsen, Saxony into a working-class family. He completed a commercial apprenticeship from 1944 to 1947 that was interrupted several times due to World War II. After the war ended in 1945, Sieber became a member of the Communist Party of Germany (KPD). After the Communist Party unified with the Social Democratic Party of Germany (SPD) in April 1946, the parties became Socialist Unity Party of Germany (SED). In order to achieve the Abitur necessary for a university degree, Sieber attended the pre-study institute from the academic year of 1948/49, later ABF or Workers and Peasants Faculty of Leipzig University. He passed the Abitur in 1950 and belonged to the first student class of the newly founded Berlin School of Economics (HfÖ), now Berlin School of Economics and Law, in Karlshorst, Berlin. Due to his good academic standing, Sieber was already delegated to Moscow in 1951, probably one of the first GDR students in the Soviet Union, where he attended lectures at the Moscow State Economic Institute and lomonosov University. He completed his studies in 1956 as a graduate economist.

Subsequently, Sieber worked in various functions in teaching at the HfÖ until 1973. First a research assistant, then a senior assistant, he received his doctorate in 1959 at the university with the dissertation On the Nature and Development of Some Fundamental Theses of the Theory of "Organized Capitalism" and the Views of "Economic Democracy" in Germany in the years 1918-1933. In 1963 he was habilitated with the publication Wirtschaftstheorien, die die rechtssozialisten verteidigen and in 1964 he was appointed professor with a teaching assignment, at the same time he became vice-rector of the university. From 1969 Sieber held the Chair of the History of Political Economy at the Section Marxism-Leninism of the HfÖ. In addition, he had been a member of the company union leadership of the Free German Trade Union Federation since 1961 and of the central SED party leadership of the university since 1963.

== Career ==
From 1963 to 1967 Sieber was the FDGB Berlin representative in the Volkskammer. From 1967 to 1976 he was a member of the Volkskammer of the FDGB parliamentary group. Then from 1967 to 1974, Sieber was chairman of the Interparliamentary Group, which under his leadership sought admission to the International Parliamentary Union (IPU). This took place in September 1972 at the 60th IPU Conference in Rome and was an important step for the worldwide diplomatic recognition of the GDR from 1973. Sieber was a member of the National Committee for Political Sciences of the GDR founded in 1974 at the Academy of Sciences of the GDR.

Because of his appearances on the international stage as head of the Inter-Parliamentary Group of the Volkskammer and because of his origin, which did not originate from the party apparatus, the GDR Foreign Ministry considered him suitable to take over an ambassador post in Western countries. As early as the early 1970s, he was asked whether he could imagine an ambassadorial post in the United States. Provided that he did not finally switch to the diplomatic service and was prepared accordingly, Sieber agreed. He then spent time at the GDR embassy in Stockholm where Ambassador Peter Steglich taught him the tools of diplomacy. In addition, there was an intensive lesson in English at the Foreign Language Institute of the GDR Foreign Ministry. From 13 to 23 August 1971, Sieber led a delegation to India meeting with Prime Minister Indira Gandhi, Lok Sabha Speaker Gurdial Singh Dhillon, Rajya Sabha Chairman Gopal Swarup Pathak, Minister of External Affairs Swaran Singh, Raj Bahadur Minister of Parliamentary Affairs, Raghunath Keshav Khadilkar, and Karan Singh.

In September 1974, Sieber was appointed as ambassador to the United States after East Germany and the U.S. established formal relations with effect from September 4, 1974. He began serving as ambassador on December 11 when he presented his credentials to President Gerald Ford. Sieber began his service as ambassador in November 1974 and served as ambassador until 1978 while also being accredited to Canada where the GDR did not have a physical diplomatic presence.

During Sieber's time as ambassador, the first bilateral agreements were concluded between the U.S. and East Germany, the effects of which he and his embassy staff had to prepare and supervise. For the first time, from 1 January 1977, GDR merchant ships were allowed to call directly at US ports in order to transport goods from there to the GDR. Until then, the GDR had to use foreign shipping companies at often overpriced prices. The preliminary talks with the relevant port authorities took place via the GDR embassy. Among other things, the GDR merchant ships transported feed grain from the U.S. for GDR agriculture. In addition, there were first contracts of GDR companies with U.S. corporations such as Dow Chemical or Standard Oil. Another highlight of Sieber's work as ambassador was the diplomatic preparation and partial supervision of a nine-month exhibition of the Staatliche Kunstsammlungen Dresden in the U.S. under the title Die Pracht Dresden – 500 Jahre Kunstsammlung – Eine Ausstellung aus der Deutschen Demokratische Republik. The 710 works of art were shown for three months each in Washington, D.C., New York City, and San Francisco, with the new building of the National Gallery of Art in Washington opening on June 1, 1978, with the exhibition from the GDR.

In the fall of '78 Sieber was succeeded by Horst Grunert who was the then-Deputy Foreign Minister of the GDR.

== Later life ==
After his return to the GDR, Sieber was appointed rector of the Berlin University of Economics on 12 January 1979, replacing Walter Kupferschmidt. In this capacity, he was also a member of the SED district leadership in Berlin. From 1982 Sieber was also chairman of the GDR-USA Friendship Society. In 1986, Rolf Sieber became a member of the Problem Council for US Research at the Scientific Council for Foreign Policy Research of the GDR.

In 1988, together with Karl-Heinz Röder, at the invitation and mediation of the International Research & Exchanges Board (IREX), he was received by the Nobel Laureate in Economics Paul Samuelson of Massachusetts Institute of Technology (MIT) and US Presidential Advisor and Economist John Kenneth Galbraith of Harvard University for a comprehensive scientific exchange of views. One of his last official acts was the incorporation of the Josef Orlopp Technical School for Foreign Trade into the HfÖ in August 1988. On October 28, 1988, Sieber was replaced as rector by Christa Luft. He remained a professor at the university until the dissolution of the HfÖ.

In retirement, Sieber became involved in the Society for the Protection of Civil Rights and Human Dignity (GBM) and published several writings there.

Rolf Sieber died at the age of 90 in 2020.
