= Permanent Representative of Germany to the United Nations =

Ambassador and Permanent Representative of Germany to the United Nations
- Incumbent; Ricklef Beutin since August 2025
- Style: His Excellency
- Appointer: Frank-Walter Steinmeier
- Inaugural holder: Hans Riesser
- Formation: 1952
- Website: Permanent Mission

The role of the ambassador and permanent representative of Germany to the United Nations is as the leader of the German delegation to the United Nations in New York City and as head of the Permanent Mission of the Federal Republic of Germany to the UN. The position has the rank and status of an ambassador extraordinary and plenipotentiary and is also the representative of Germany in the United Nations Security Council.

The permanent representative, currently Ricklef Beutin, is charged with representing Germany, both through its non-permanent seat on the U.N. Security Council and also during plenary meetings of the General Assembly, except in the rare situation in which a more senior officer (such as the minister for foreign affairs or the president) is present.

== History of representatives ==
The Federal Republic of Germany (West Germany) was admitted to the UN as an observer in 1955. The German Democratic Republic (East Germany) was admitted as an observer in 1972. On 18 September 1973 both were admitted as full members by the United Nations General Assembly, following the recommendation of the Security Council by Resolution 335 on 22 June 1973. Through the accession of the German Democratic Republic to the Federal Republic of Germany, it was effective on 3 October 1990.

== Office holders ==
=== Ambassadors of the Federal Republic of Germany ===
Incumbent	Start of term	End of term
Hans Riesser	1952	1955
Felix von Eckardt	1955	1956
Georg von Broich-Oppert	1956	1958
Carl Werner Dankwort	1958	1960
Karl Heinrich Knappstein	1960	1962
Sigismund Freiherr von Braun	1962	1968
Alexander Böker	1968	1971
Walter Gehlhoff	1971	1974
Rüdiger Freiherr von Wechmar	1974	1981
Günther van Well	1981	1984
Hans Werner Lautenschlager	1984	1987
Alexander Graf York von Wartenburg	1987	1989
Hans-Otto Bräutigam	1989	1990
Detlev Graf zu Rantzau	1990	1995
Tono Eitel	1995	1998
Dieter Kastrup	1998	2001
Hanns Heinrich Schumacher (Chargé d'affaires)	2001	2002
Gunter Pleuger	2002	2006
Thomas Matussek	2006	2009
Peter Wittig	2009	2014
Harald Braun	2014	2017
Christoph Heusgen	2017	2021
Antje Leendertse	2021	2025
Ricklef Beutin	2025	present

=== Ambassadors of the German Democratic Republic ===
Incumbent	Start of term	End of term
Horst Grunert	1972	1973
Peter Florin	1973	1982
Harry Ott	1982	1988
Siegfried Zachmann	1988	1990

== See also ==
- Germany and the United Nations
- Foreign relations of Germany
