= Harald Braun (diplomat) =

German diplomat

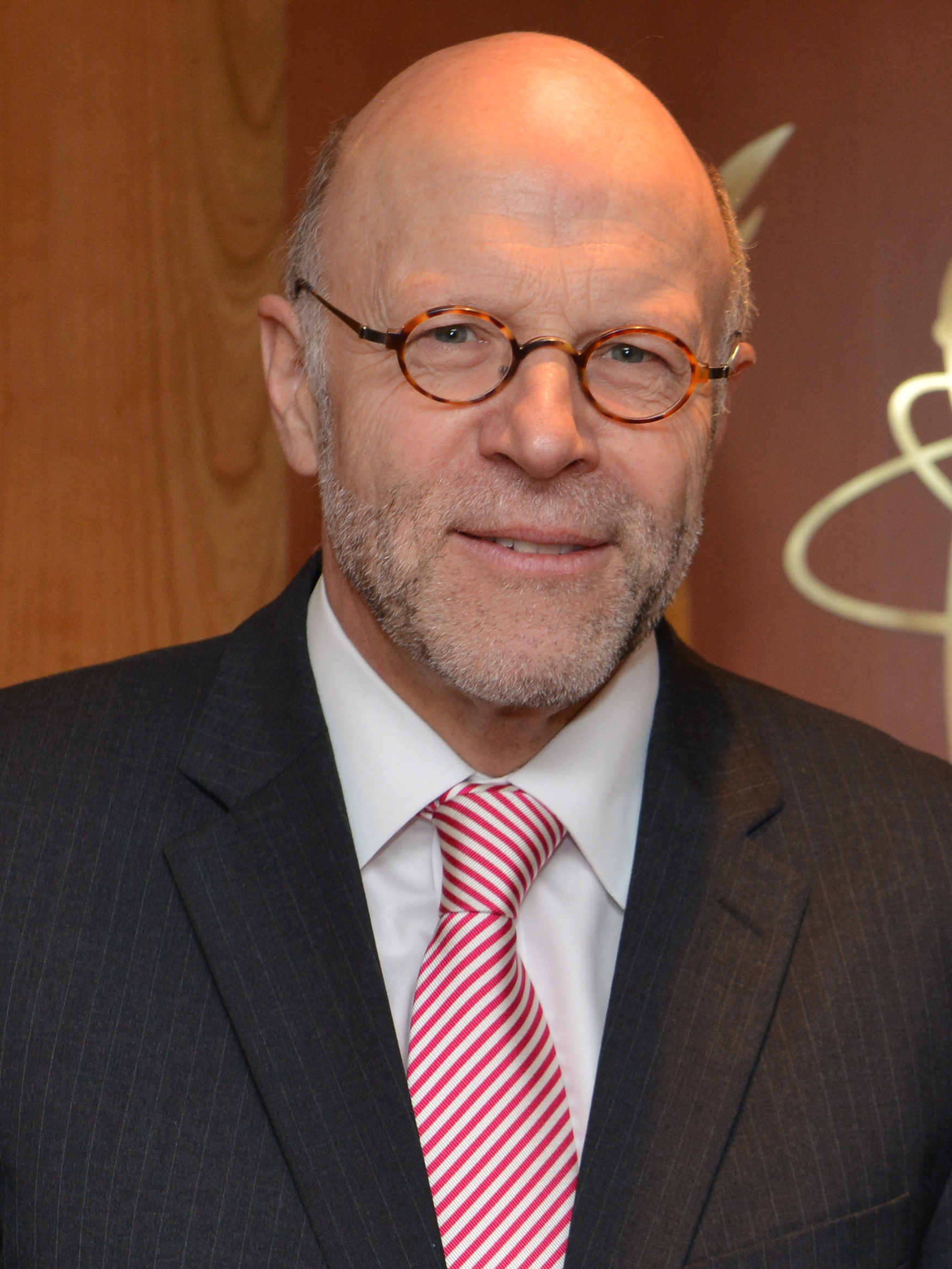
Harald Braun visiting the IAEA in 2014

Harald Braun (born 1952) is a former senior German diplomat who served as the Permanent Representative of Germany to the United Nations in New York from 2014 to 2017. In 2016, Ambassador Braun was elected vice president of the 71st UN General Assembly. From 2011 to 2014 he was State Secretary of the German Foreign Ministry.

After graduating from Goldberg-Gymnasium in Sindelfingen in 1971, Harald Braun served for two years in the German army, followed by an apprenticeship at IBM Germany. He then completed two M.A. degrees in economics and history in Tübingen and New York and added a doctorate at SUNY Stony Brook before entering the Foreign Service in 1981.

His diplomatic postings include Beirut, London, Bujumbura, Washington and Paris. Harald Braun also served as deputy foreign and security adviser to the federal chancellor (2003–05).

From 2005 to 2008, he spent three years in the private sector as corporate senior vice president for group policy and external affairs at Siemens AG in Munich.

Since 2008, Harald Braun has been an honorary professor for global studies and diplomacy at the State University of New York at Stony Brook. In 2017 Chancellor Angela Merkel appointed him chairman of the board of trustees of EVZ Foundation, the German foundation to compensate victims of forced and slave labour during the Nazi period.

He is currently Vice Chairman of the Board of Mainmark Foundation, Presidium Member, United Nations Association of Germany, and is active in a number of professional and charitable organisations.

Ambassador Braun was awarded an honorary citizenship of Washington D.C. He is Grand Officier of the French Légion d'honneur, bearer of the Grand Cross of the Italian Order of Merit and further international distinctions, as well as a member of the Knights of the Order of St. John.

He is married and has three children and three grandchildren.
