= East Germany–Soviet Union relations =

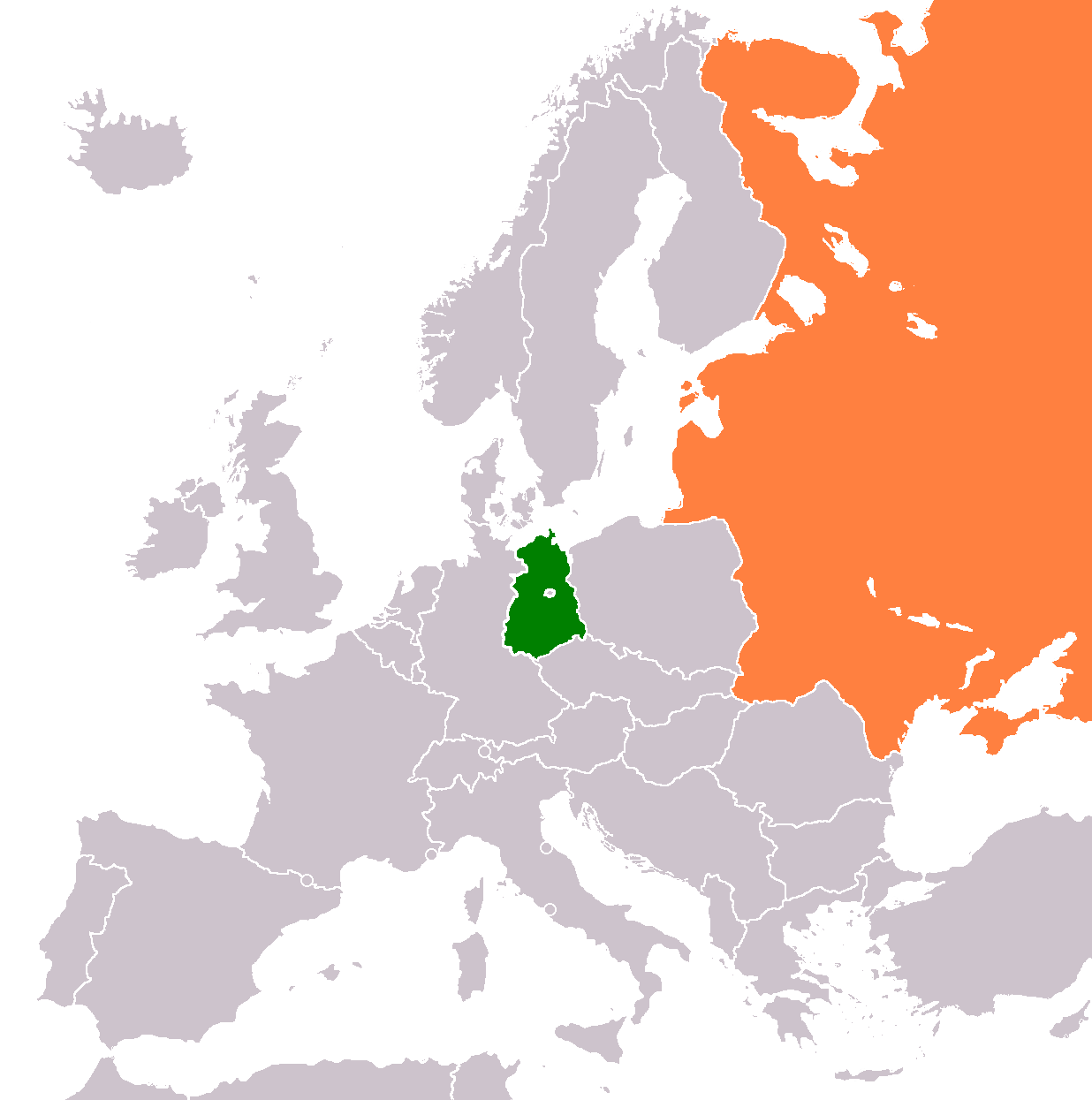

- East Germany: Soviet Union

Throughout their existence East Germany and the Soviet Union maintained close diplomatic relations. The Soviet Union was the chief economic and political sponsor of East Germany (German Democratic Republic, GDR).

== Country comparison ==
Common name	East Germany	Soviet Union
Official name	German Democratic Republic	Union of Soviet Socialist Republics
Emblem		
Flag		
Capital	East Berlin	Moscow
Largest city	East Berlin	Moscow
Population	16,111,000 (1990)	286,730,819 (1989)
Government	Socialist state	See Government of the Soviet Union
First Leader	Otto Grotewohl	Vladimir Lenin
Last Leader	Lothar de Maizière	Mikhail Gorbachev
Religion	State atheism	State secularism (de jure), state atheism (de facto)
Official languages	German	Russian

== The rise of the GDR economy ==
=== Stalin era ===
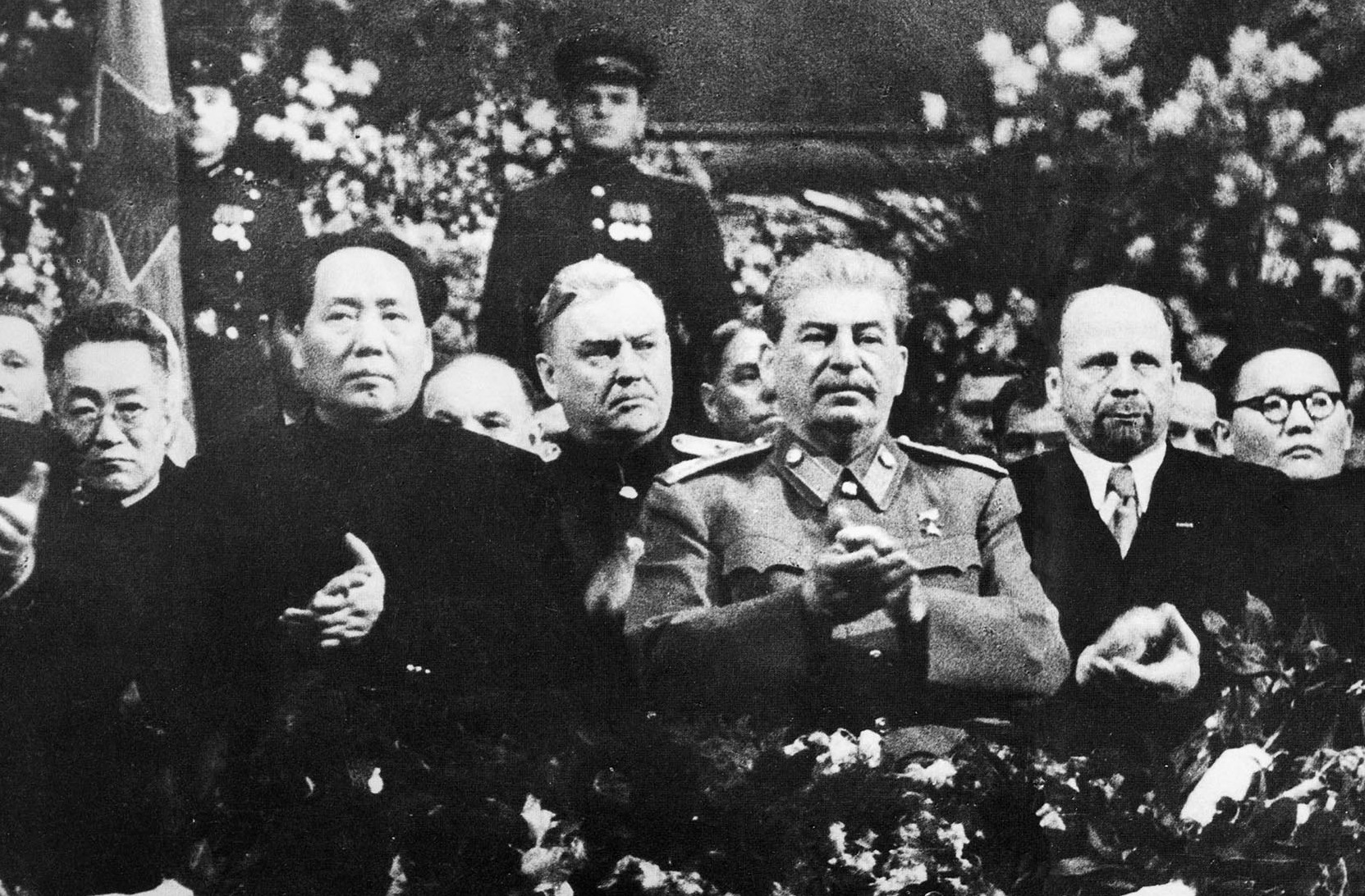
Mao, Bulganin, Stalin, Ulbricht and Tsedenbal 1949

East Germany emerged from the Soviet occupation zone as a legacy of the Second World War. As early as 1946, the Soviets founded a border police to secure the emerging border. The Soviets appointed the German communist Walter Ulbricht, who returned from Soviet exile in 1945, and whose Ulbricht group was tasked with building new state structures. The forced unification of the KPD with the SPD to form the Socialist Unity Party of Germany (SED) was carried out in April 1946 under the influence of Soviet power.

After the founding of the SED, Ulbricht was initially pushed to the margins, but in 1948 he was given the task by Stalin to ideologically “purge” the new party. A campaign to purge the SED of the influences of Titoism and social democracy took place and the SED was aligned with the Stalinist party model. As a reward, Ulbricht became the leading politician of the German Democratic Republic (East Germany), founded on October 7, 1949.

After Adenauer rejected the offers of the Stalin notes, the East German integration into the Eastern Bloc was strengthened and the SED announced the building of socialism ("Aufbau des Sozialismus") in July 1952. After an “intensification of the class struggle “ was announced, the economic situation worsened. An increase in labor standards shortly after Stalin's death sparked the uprising of June 17, 1953, which was crushed with the help of Soviet tanks, leaving at least 50 dead. Up to 1,500 people were sentenced to prison and the Red Army handed down five death sentences. The state security apparatus was then strengthened and migration westward increased.

=== De-stalinization and Khrushchev era ===
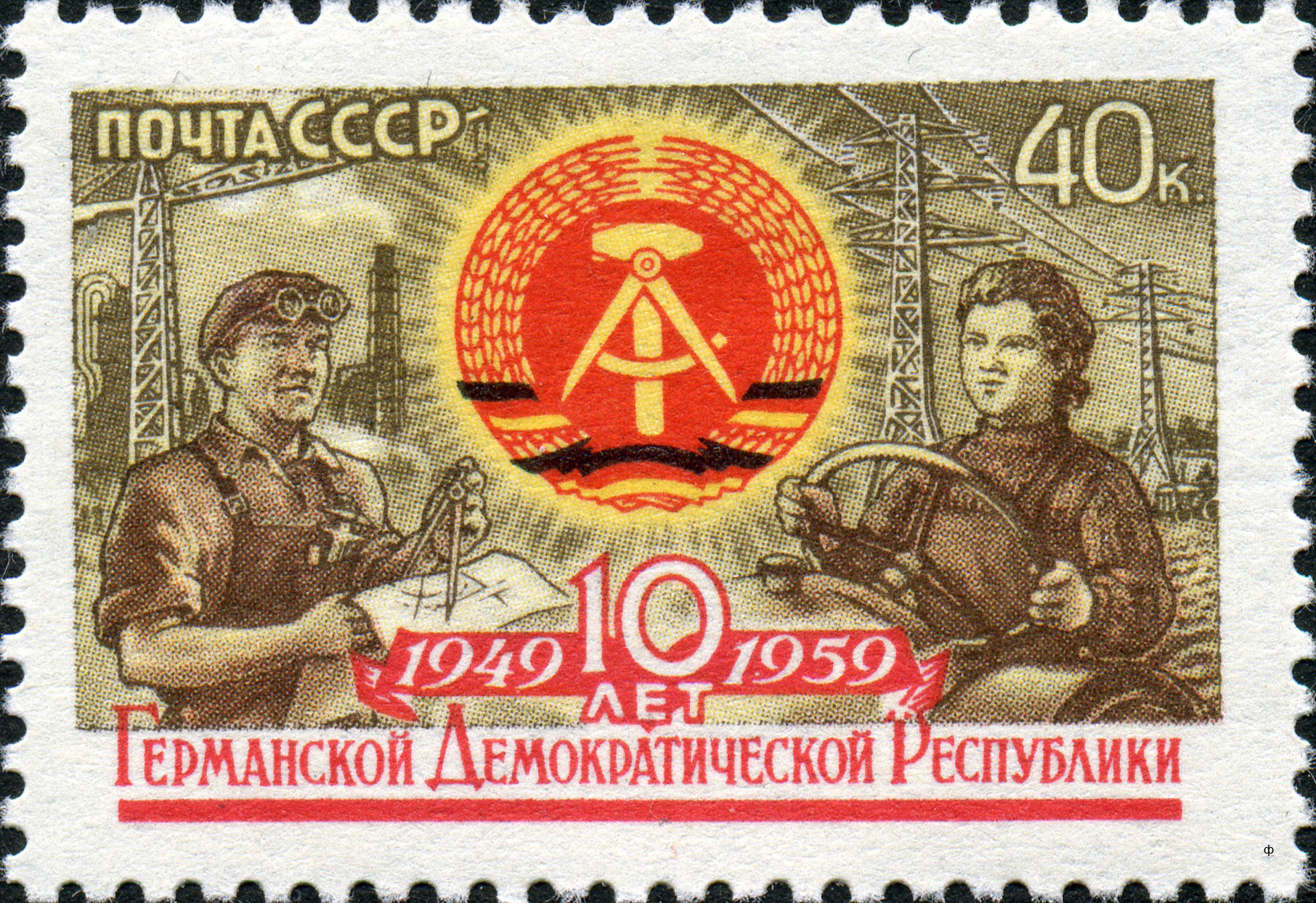
Soviet Union stamp of 1959, marking the tenth anniversary of the German Democratic Republic (East Germany)

As part of de-Stalinization, Ulbricht now announced a “German path to socialism,” which he had previously rejected. However, the ties to the Soviet Union remained close and the East Germany joined the Warsaw Pact in 1955 with the “Treaty on Relations between the GDR and the USSR”.

The Berlin Crisis of 1958–1959 began in November 1958 when Nikita Khrushchev called for a revision of the Potsdam Agreement. As a result, the Soviets stationed nuclear missiles on the territory of the GDR for the first time that could reach Western Europe. Meanwhile, a second wave of socialisation of production led to extensive collectivization of agriculture and increased population emigration. In response to this, the GDR began building the Berlin Wall in 1961 and sealing off the border with the West Germany to prevent the population from emigrating, which was referred to in the GDR as the construction of an “Anti-Fascist Protection Rampart”. The border was closed at the initiative of Khrushchev in the Berlin Crisis of 1961, who feared for the survival of the GDR if emigration continued. He told Hans Kroll: “Of course, we closed the border, that was at our instigation. Technically, the GDR carried out this because it is a German question.” However, he publicly distanced himself from it and instead let Ulbricht speak, as the construction of the wall was a clear admission of weakness.

On 13 June 1963, Soviet-GDR joint communique recorded Ulbricht's praise for Khrushchev's policy of "mutual example" in a manner that could be read as giving approval in principle to further Soviet efforts in that vein, including a reduction in the Soviet forces in East Germany.

In 1964, Anastas Mikoyan's 10–12 March trip to East Berlin, ostensibly to celebrate the 70th birthday of inactive and ailing Premier Otto Grotewohl, was particularly curious in light of the fact- that no other bloc dignitaries of Mikoyan's rank attended. Mikoyan's appearance seemed to represent a Soviet effort to assuage East German fears on certain economic and military points of disagreement.

=== Brezhnev era ===
On the day Khrushchev left for his vacation, East German Premier Willi Stoph made a sudden visit to Moscow and commenced an intensive three-day series of talks with Kosygin and other high-level Kremlin leaders. The timing of Stoph's visit was ostensibly for the purpose of opening an exhibit devoted to the 15th anniversary of the GDR.

Then in rapid succession, Suslov and Brezhnev came forward with strong statements reassuring the East German leaders about Soviet intentions toward East Germany. Suslov made a flat no-sell-out pledge in Moscow on the same day (5 October) that Brezhnev was welcomed in East Berlin by Ulbricht, who had refused to greet Khrushchev's son-in law two months earlier. Ulbricht on 6 October responded with a rather defiant lecture on the limits of Soviet interference in GDR sovereignty. And at the same podium Brezhnev promised that there would be no "behind-the-back" deals detrimental to GDR interests.

Mikhail Suslov, in his 5 October speech at a Kremlin meeting devoted to the GDR anniversary, went out of his way to deny the possibility of a Bonn-Moscow deal at the expense of the GDR's "sovereignty". Suslov voiced the flat "guarantee" that "even if all the gold in the world were offered, the relations between Moscow and East Berlin would still not be for sale.

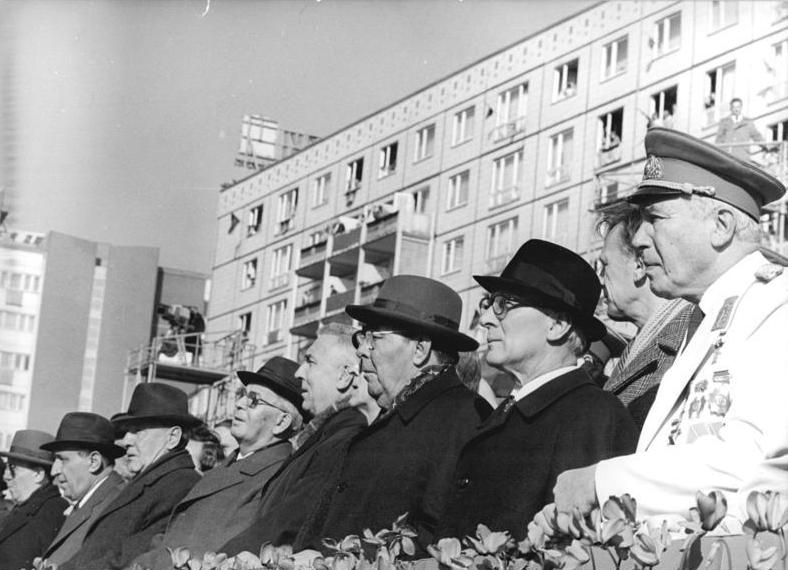
Leonid Brezhnev with Erich Honecker on the 30th anniversary of the founding of the GDR (1979)

The initial GDR reaction to Khrushchev's ouster and its treatment of the sell-out question was ambivalent. On the one hand, there was evidence to suggest that Khruschev's removal brought quick relief to the leaders in East Berlin about the fate of East Germany's future. The GDR's first official reaction to the Kremlin coup, which was registered in the 17 October communique of the Central Committee of the Socialist Unity Party of Germany—the first Eastern European party statement on the Khrushchev ouster—was that the friendship treaty of June 1964 will be carried out "honorably" implying, perhaps, that there was some question among the East German leaders as to whether it would have been honorably implemented prior to Khrushchev's ouster.

The new leadership may have felt that other more pressing domestic and foreign matters demanded their initial concentration and that any major diplomatic action such as the Bonn visit—on the German question should be postponed. Concentration on other foreign and domestic matters may also explain, in part, Moscow's dropping of any element of urgency in the new Soviet peace treaty line.

In April 1971, Erich Honecker took power in the GDR, who was able to win the support of Leonid Brezhnev during his power struggle with Ulbricht. Honecker followed the Soviet model very closely, which enabled him to improve relations with the USSR. In 1974 he proclaimed that “there is virtually no crucial area of daily life in which friendship with the Soviet Union is not reflected.”

On 5 October 1979, while Brezhnev was visiting East Germany in the 30th anniversary of the foundation of the East German state, the two countries signed a ten-year agreement of mutual support under which East Germany would provide ships, machinery and chemical equipment to the Soviet Union and the Soviet Union would provide fuel and nuclear equipment to East Germany.

=== 1980s and Gorbachev era ===
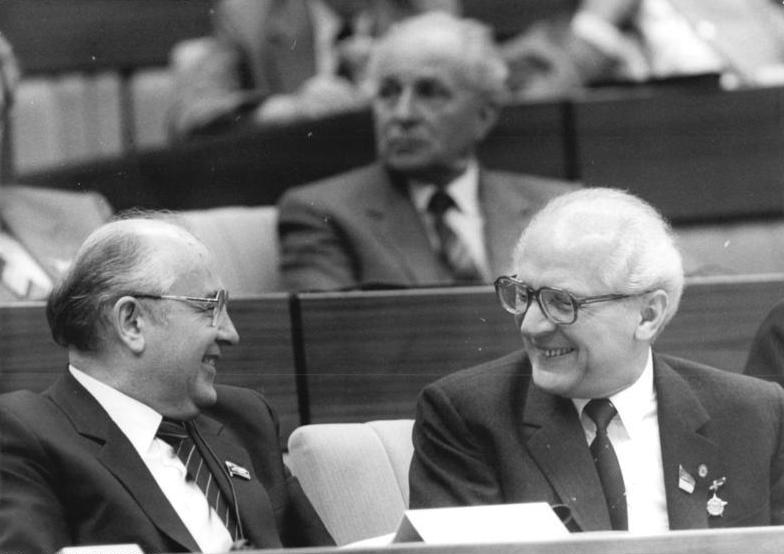
Mikhail Gorbachev with Erich Honecker in 1986

In 1981, the Soviets reduced their oil deliveries, whereupon the West Germany offered aid payments in return for travel relief for GDR citizens. Due to the poor economic situation, the GDR was forced to accept the offer, which Moscow disliked.

After reforms were introduced under Mikhail Gorbachev in the mid-1980s, Honecker refused to make any changes and became increasingly distanced from reality. The hardliner Honecker had already wanted the National People's Army invade the People's Republic of Poland in 1981 in order to suppress Solidarity and in 1988 he announced "socialism in the colors of the GDR" in order to distance himself from the reformers in the Kremlin. Gorbachev visited the GDR in October 1989 on the last and 40th anniversary of its existence, although the process of dissolution of the Eastern Bloc had already begun. He warned the GDR leadership to pursue reforms with the words: “If we stay behind, life will punish us immediately.” A reporter used this to construct the well-known saying: “life punishes those who come too late".

Before German reunification, there were intensive negotiations between Gorbachev, Kohl and the major Western powers. The Treaty on the Final Settlement with Respect to Germany was negotiated in September 1990, paving the way for the reunification of Germany on 3 October 1990.

== Economic relations ==
The GDR had close economic ties to the Soviet Union through the Council for Mutual Economic Assistance and was supplied with oil from the Friendship Pipeline, which was built in 1959. The Soviets were the most important trade and economic partner, with which almost 38 percent of the GDR's foreign trade was transacted in 1981. The Soviets supplied petroleum and other raw materials to the GDR, while uranium from the GDR was very important for the Soviet nuclear industry.

== Cultural relations ==
The GDR emerged under the influence of the Soviet Union and remained tied to it throughout its existence. The influence of the USSR as a role model and socialist brother state was not only limited to politics and economics, but also to culture. Erich Honecker summed this up when he announced in 1974 that “there is practically no crucial area of everyday life in which friendship with the Soviet Union is not reflected.” Russian was taught as the first foreign language in school and the Society for German-Soviet Friendship was the second largest mass organization in the GDR with six million members. Soviet-Russian culture, music, cuisine and media products were widespread in the GDR.

Glasnost and Perestroika were rejected by the GDR in the 1980s. In the final phase of the GDR, the government even had Soviet media such as Sputnik censored because they began to report critically as part of Gorbachev's reforms.
