= Foreign relations of Germany =

The Federal Republic of Germany (up until 1990 abbreviated as FRG, opposed to GDR) is a Central European country and founding member of the European Union, a member of G4, G7, the G20, the Organizations for Economic Co-operation and Development, the North Atlantic Treaty Organization (NATO) and the only remaining of two former German members of the United Nations. It maintains a network of 229 diplomatic missions abroad and holds relations with more than 190 countries. As one of the world's leading industrialized countries it is recognized as a major power in European and global affairs.

Germany's relations to other powers are characterized by its past and by its commitment to promote peace, stability, the rule of law and democracy, while it seeks a progressing integration into the European Union. The heavily West-aligned Germany inherited diplomatic relations and missions from communist East Germany, which was "Germany" to those countries which had only relations to one of the two German states. However, due to its allegiance and market economy, the perception of Germany by some of the former Eastern bloc countries changed with Germany's reunification.

== History ==
The history of German foreign policy covers diplomatic developments and international history since the foundation of Germany in 1871.

Before 1866, Habsburg Austria and its German Confederation were the nominal leader in German affairs, but the Hohenzollern Kingdom of Prussia exercised increasingly dominant influence in German affairs, owing partly to its ability to participate in German Confederation politics through its Brandenburg holding, and its ability to influence trade through its Zollverein network. The question of excluding or including Austria's influence was settled by the Prussian victory in the Austro-Prussian War (also named the German War or the German-German War) in 1866, excluding the Austrian Empire from Germany. The unification of Germany was the political purpose of the Franco-Prussian War of 1870–71, in which the smaller German states joined behind remaining Prussia in a smashing victory over France. The German Empire was erected in 1871 by Otto von Bismarck, who dominated German and indeed all of European diplomatic history until he was forced to resign in 1890.

Germany's diplomatic weight increased by transitioning its economy and society from an agrarian country to Europe's second industrial powerhouse, which soon sought competition with the leading economic power of that era, Great Britain. As from 1884, Germany engaged – as the last major European power – in overseas colonization, but held only few colonies for economical exploitation, leaving Germany vulnerable to the protectionist mercantilism of other colonial powers who controlled the world's market of raw materials. Germany's development and transition led to internal tensions, which Emperor Wilhelm II., infamous for his Hun speech throughout Europe and an increasing diplomatic liability, sought to hedge with naval armament and increased imperialism much to the suspicion of the other European powers, especially the Entente Cordiale. Encircled by the Triple Entente, and due to the negligence of Germany's emperor and his diplomatic advisors by giving Austria-Hungary a "blank cheque" on treating Entente-allied Serbia for the assassination of Archduke Ferdinand, the Empire of Germany had to fight back its enemies in a war on multiple fronts and was cut off from international trade routes, leading to hunger and impoverishment in Europe's most populous country.

Germany was defeated in the battlefield in 1918, with its riches turning to spoils for the victors. The country had neither say nor seat at the table on which the victors negotiated how Germany and its treasures would be apportioned. The Treaty of Versailles forced Germany to convey away Alsace-Lorraine to France, a part of East Prussia to the Second Polish Republic and to accept the occupation of major industrial areas around Germany's centers for coal and steel production in Silesia and the Rhine province. When Germany was unable to fulfill the Allied demand for reparations in gold, France occupied the Ruhr valley to shave Germany's coal production. The Weimar Republic had to solve these crises to gain back its international stand in diplomacy, which lead Germany to joining the League of Nations in 1926.

However, the ransack and ongoing compromisation of Germany after World War I came with a toll on its internal stability and put the republic's attempt to establish peace and order to failure and its diplomatic influence from marginal to inept. Political extremist factions from left and right put the screws on Germany's politics by rallying against the weakened republic. International indifference to the events in the defeated country only turned into cautious unease after the Reichstag fire and Adolf Hitler's rise to power in 1933. The newly appointed chancellor ran on a platform of revising the Treaty of Versailles by rearmament, shaking off the shackles of occupation and "gaining room to live" (occupation) in the East. Racial and genocidal undertones in his program were internationally ignored as the new government was able to establish the long-sought peace and order in Germany and pursued international recognition as a stabilizing power: although Hitler's government withdrew Germany's membership from the League of Nations in 1933 much to the wary of the remaining nations, Germany managed to appease the world by hosting the Olympic Games of 1936 and presenting the world a stable, progressive and prospering country while secretly starting a program for rearmament at the same time. Shortly after the games, Germany signed the Anti-Comintern Pact with Japan, which sought to establish a common sphere of interest between Germany and Japan and their allied countries as well. Initially the pact was directed against the Soviet Union.

Despite its public presentation, Germany soon would raise suspicion by its rapidly progressing military programs, which weren't overlooked by international press. With massive interference in the internal affairs of Austria, which was unable to overcome economical challenges for 20 years after the fall of the Austro-Hungarian Empire, Germany managed to annex Austria in the Anschluss, reversing the resolution of the German war 70 years earlier and violating the Treaty of Versailles once again, which forbade the union of both countries. Germany tested its newly gained strength on boosting the Sudeten crisis of 1938, as Sudeten Germans, attracted by Germany and its success, rebelled against Czechoslovak authorities. The crisis lead to the Munich Agreement, the first gain in territory for Germany since World War I. However, Hitler was dissatisfied with how the crisis was solved peacefully. The policy of appeasement by Neville Chamberlain allowed for Hitler to violate the agreement shortly after signing it, by dissolving the Czechoslovak government and occupying the rest of the country in 1939, followed by the wary European powers of France and Great Britain to draw a red line for Poland. Germany signed the Pact of Steel with Italy, shaping with the Anti-Comintern Pact with Japan before and with the Tripartite Pact later on, what will come to be the Axis alliance.

After signing the Molotov-Ribbentrop Pact with the USSR on 24 August 1939, which led Japan to distance itself from Germany until the Tripartite Pact was signed in 1940, Germany invaded Poland on 1 September 1939, with the declaration of war followed by Britain and France three days later. The declarations of war did little to change the outcome of the Blitzkrieg against Poland, which soon was occupied by German and Soviet forces. Less than two years later, Germany would invade the USSR under violation of the pact. The same year, the Axis-allied Japanese Empire would attack Pearl Harbor, and as Germany was bound to aid Japan diplomatically by the Tripartite Pact, Hitler declared war against the USA four days after, unintentionally ending any remaining meaningful isolationist opposition in the U.S. against joining the European war and changing the U.S. stance to the rest of the world to this day.

The following years, German diplomacy is occupied with supporting the war effort and keeping together the Axis alliance as well as attending to the minor Axis-allied governments in Europe, such as Hungary, Romania, Slovakia, Bulgaria (all Warsaw Pact states after the Soviet Union won the war in the East) and Croatia to facilitate the "Final Solution". As Germany found itself on the losing side over time, Germany's diplomacy lost its ability to back up the increasingly futile war effort. Only the invocation of favors and long-lasting diplomatic aid and relationships with countries like Chile and Argentina, as well as their own network, enabled the escape of some Nazi high-ranks and collaborators into exile, such as Dr. Josef Mengele. The government of Germany, and therefore its diplomatic corps, ceased to exist according to the Allied Control Council's 1st Proclamation.

Germany as a state was only reestablished in August 1949 in three of the four Allied occupation zones, but international representation for the state was not reestablished until 15 March 1951. As a habit, chancellor Konrad Adenauer employed former Nazis for his administration, and for foreign affairs, he employed former NSDAP diplomats, which left a dark stain on the founding history of the newly formed Federal Foreign Office as a democratic institution.

The first years of the Bonn republic were characterized by the efforts of a second democratic Germany to rehabilitate itself in the eyes of the world. Adenauer's government decided to align West Germany with the Western bloc and made controversial decisions in its early years. Only ten years after World War II has ended, his government decided to rearm Germany once again, founding the Bundeswehr in 1955 and joining the NATO, after he discarded Stalin's attempt to negotiate reunification and neutralization of Germany in 1952. The years of Germany's division and the relations of the two German states, West-German FRG and East-German GDR, to each other mirrored the grander conflict at the Iron Curtain and the two systems. Mutual distrust, exclusion and agitation against one another captured the division of the two German nations. The FRG would characterize any attempt to open diplomatic relations to "the other German state" as an unfriendly act which would provoke the closure of the West-German diplomatic mission in the attempting country. The GDR assumed the sole right of representation for all Germans within the Eastern bloc. However, West Germany attracted some of the communist countries to open diplomatic missions despite the risk of spurning the East-German government, as the Eastern bloc was in dire need of hard currency and its members tried to open channels to markets which would trade in such.

In the 1970s, chancellor Willy Brandt would attempt to ease the relations between the two German states to prevent future confrontations like the Cuba crisis a few years earlier, in which the world narrowly escaped a World War III and nuclear annihilation. West Germany acknowledged the borders which were established after World War II, namely the Oder–Neisse line with Poland. The chancellor's Kniefall von Warschau would mark a major pivot point in the international perception of Germany, from a defeated and criminal warmongering power to a society which collectively would feel ashamed by its past, would swear to abstain military power and dominance and to uphold peace and to seek friendly relations with the People Germany wronged in the past. The gesture found cautiously positive remarks internationally, and Willy Brandt was awarded the Nobel Peace Prize of 1971, to this day the only German chancellor ever being awarded the prize. 1973, both East and West Germany became United Nations members.

Willy Brandt's policies helped grander diplomatic efforts between the two super powers and would bear fruit shortly after his tenure, when the Helsinki Accords were signed in 1975. The Accords enabled organizations of the civil society and NGOs to assess whether the Soviet Union would abide the legally binding declarations it signed, for the rule of law, civil liberties and guarantees of property. They also lead to the arising of human rights activism in the East bloc and to media activity directed from the West towards the East.

"Leonid Brezhnev had looked forward, Anatoly Dobrynin recalls, to the 'publicity he would gain... when the Soviet public learned of the final settlement of the postwar boundaries for which they had sacrificed so much'... '[Instead, the Helsinki Accords] gradually became a manifesto of the dissident and liberal movement'... What this meant was that the people who lived under these [communist] systems — at least the more courageous — could claim official permission to say what they thought."

— John Lewis Gaddis, The Cold War: A New History (2005),

Especially for the partaking East German government, which was confident at first the Accords would denote a victory for East bloc diplomacy, the Accords would turn out to be a calamity in internal affairs. West German media, consumed by the East German population despite attempts of inhibition, informed their audience about their rights the East German government just signed off on, very much including the sensitive issue of freedom of movement, especially between the two German states which shared a fortified and dangerous-to-life border, symbolized by the Berlin Wall. Ever since the Accords have been signed, the East German government had to face increasing mail of citizens who petitioned for "permanent departure" to West Germany, invoking the Helsinki Accords.

As East Germany's economical situation became untenable in the 1980s, West German prime minister of Bavaria, Franz Josef Strauß, procured a new credit line for the GDR in 1983, which (by its interest) would impede the economical collapse of East Germany. Combined with the growing frictions within East Germany's society and the continuous escape movement of Germans through Eastern Europe and diplomatic missions of Germany, the GDR would survive its 40th anniversary and peaceful protests by only less than a year, with the collapse of its communist government heavily quickened by negotiations of West Germany to enable the "permanent departure" of Germans by a non-stop train from the Czech Republic through East Germany to West Germany. The departure met intense media coverage, creating a lasting impression on both sides of the German border and forecasting the eventual fall of the Berlin Wall.

In 1990, both German states with both freely elected governments, as well as the four former occupying powers, would sign an agreement about Germany's future. The agreement became effective on 3 October of the same year, which became the German Unity Day.

== Primary institutions and actors ==
=== Federal Cabinet ===
The three cabinet-level ministries responsible for guiding Germany's foreign policy are the Ministry of Defense, the Ministry of Economic Cooperation and Development and the Federal Foreign Office. In practice, most German federal departments play some role in shaping foreign policy in the sense that there are few policy areas left that remain outside of international jurisdiction. The bylaws of the Federal Cabinet (as delineated in Germany's Basic Law), however, assign the Federal Foreign Office a coordinating function. Accordingly, other ministries may only invite foreign guests or participate in treaty negotiations with the approval of the Federal Foreign Office.

=== Bundestag ===
With respect to foreign policy, the Bundestag acts in a supervisory capacity. Each of its committees – most notably the foreign relations committee – oversees the country's foreign policy. The consent of the Bundestag (and insofar as Länder are impacted, the Bundesrat) is required to ratify foreign treaties. If a treaty legislation passes first reading, it is referred to the Committee on Foreign Affairs, which is capable of delaying ratification and prejudice decision through its report to the Bundestag.

In 1994, a full EU Committee was also created for the purpose of addressing the large flow of EU-related topics and legislation. Also, the committee has the mandate to speak on behalf of the Bundestag and represent it when deciding an EU policy position. A case in point was the committee's involvement regarding the European Union's eastern enlargement wherein the Committee on Foreign Affairs is responsible for relations with ECE states while the EU Committee is tasked with the negotiations.

=== NGOs ===
There is a raft of NGOs in Germany that engage foreign policy issues. These NGOs include think-tanks (German Council on Foreign Relations), single-issue lobbying organizations (Amnesty International), as well as other organizations that promote stronger bilateral ties between Germany and other countries (Atlantic Bridge). While the budgets and methods of NGOs are distinct, the overarching goal to persuade decision-makers to the wisdom of their own views is a shared one. In 2004, a new German governance framework, particularly on foreign and security policy areas, emerged where NGOs are integrated into actual policymaking. The idea is that the cooperation between state and civil society groups increases the quality of conflict resolution, development cooperation and humanitarian aid for fragile states. The framework seeks to benefit from the expertise of the NGOs in exchange for these groups to have a chance for influencing foreign policy.

== Disputes ==
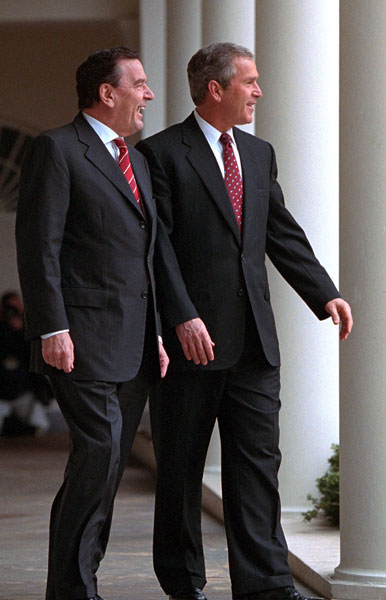
Chancellor Gerhard Schröder with U.S. President George W. Bush at the White House in 2001

In 2001, the discovery that the terrorist cell which carried out the attacks against the United States on 11 September 2001, was based in Hamburg, sent shock waves through the country.

The government of Chancellor Gerhard Schröder backed the following U.S. military actions, sending Bundeswehr troops to Afghanistan to lead a joint NATO program to provide security in the country after the ousting of the Taliban.

Nearly all of the public was strongly against America's 2003 invasion of Iraq, and any deployment of troops. This position was shared by the SPD/Green government, which led to some friction with the United States.

In August 2006, the German government disclosed a botched plot to bomb two German trains. The attack was to occur in July 2006 and involved a 21-year-old Lebanese man, identified only as Youssef Mohammed E. H. Prosecutors said Youssef and another man left suitcases stuffed with crude propane-gas bombs on the trains.

As of February 2007, Germany had about 3,000 NATO-led International Security Assistance Force force in Afghanistan as part of the war on terrorism, the third largest contingent after the United States (14,000) and the United Kingdom (5,200). German forces are mostly in the more secure north of the country.

However, Germany, along with some other larger European countries (with the exception of the UK and the Netherlands), have been criticised by the UK and Canada for not sharing the burden of the more intensive combat operations in southern Afghanistan.

== Global initiatives ==
=== Humanitarian aid and development cooperation ===
Germany is the second largest net contributor to the United Nations. The development policy of the Federal Republic of Germany is an independent area of German foreign policy. It is formulated by the Federal Ministry for Economic Cooperation and Development (BMZ) and carried out by the implementing organisations, which are currently working in more than 60 countries. The German government sees development policy as a joint responsibility of the international community. In 2024 Germany was the second biggest donor of development cooperation after the United States, spending 32.4 billion USD, equivalent to 0.67% of GNI, on Official development assistance.

== International organizations ==
Germany is a member of the P5+1, Council of Europe, European Union, European Space Agency, G4, G7, International Monetary Fund, NATO, OECD, Organization for Security and Co-operation in Europe, UN, World Bank Group and the World Trade Organization.

=== European Union ===
The flag of Europe

European integration has come a long way since the European Coal and Steel Community (ECSC) and the Elysée Treaty, and Germany has been heavily involved in many of these efforts.

- Maastricht Treaty

Most of the social issues facing European countries in general: immigration, aging populations, straining social-welfare and pension systems – are all important in Germany. Germany seeks to maintain peace through the "deepening" of integration among current members of the European Union member states

- European Defence Force
- Introduction of the single currency € Euro

Germany has been the largest net contributor to EU budgets for decades (in absolute terms – given Germany's comparatively large population – not per capita) and seeks to limit the growth of these net payments in the enlarged union.

- European Constitution

=== NATO ===
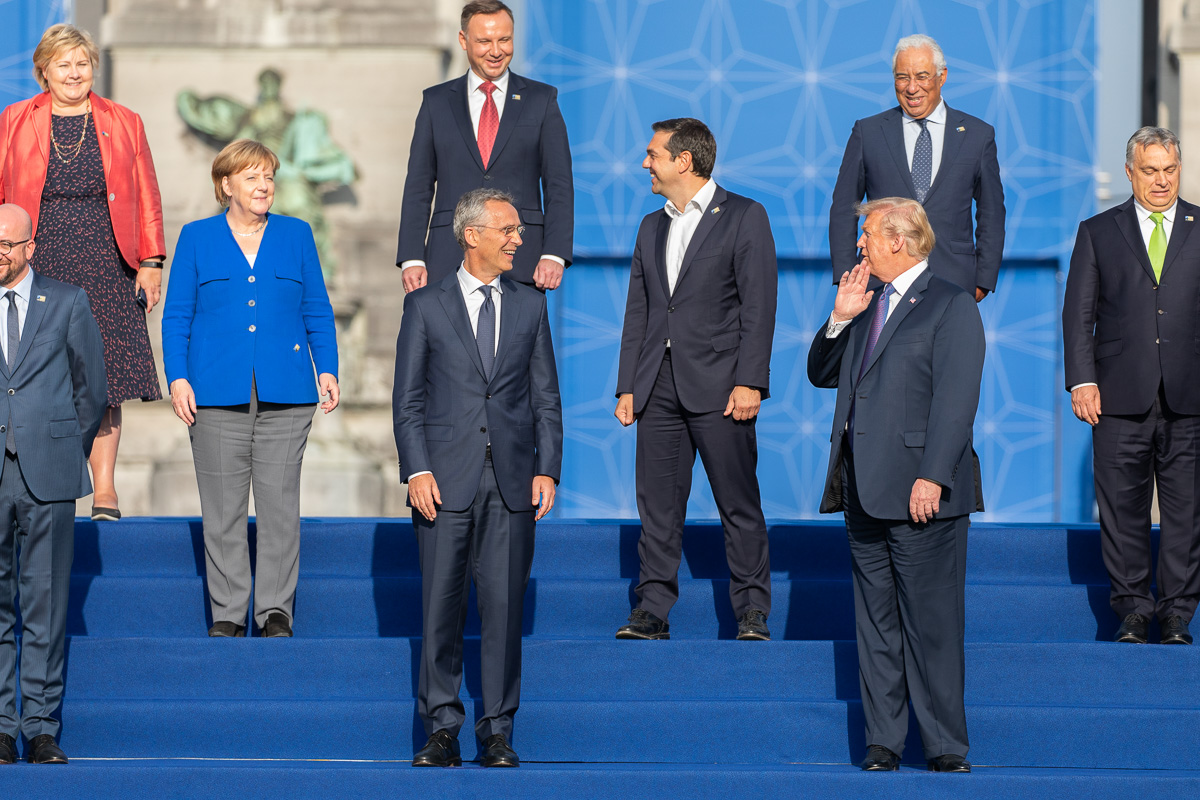
A meeting of NATO heads of States and governments on 11 July 2018 in Brussels

Under the doctrine introduced by the 2003 Defense Policy Guidelines, Germany continues to give priority to the transatlantic partnership with the United States through the North Atlantic Treaty Organization. However, Germany is giving increasing attention to coordinating its policies with the European Union through the Common Foreign and Security Policy.

=== UN ===
The German Federal Government began an initiative to obtain a permanent seat in the United Nations Security Council, as part of the Reform of the United Nations. This would require approval of a two-thirds majority of the member states and approval of all five Security Council veto powers.

This aspiration could be successful due to Germany's good relations with the People's Republic of China and the Russian Federation. Germany is a stable and democratic republic and a G7 country which are also favourable attributes. The United Kingdom and France support German ascension to the supreme body. The U.S. is sending mixed signals.

NATO member states, including Germany, decided not to sign the UN treaty on the Prohibition of Nuclear Weapons, a binding agreement for negotiations for the total elimination of nuclear weapons, supported by more than 120 nations.

== Diplomatic relations ==
List of countries which Germany maintains diplomatic relations with:

#	Country	Date
1	Netherlands	6 March 1951
2	India	7 March 1951
3	Sweden	4 April 1951
4	Luxembourg	23 April 1951
5	Norway	10 May 1951
6	United Kingdom	20 June 1951
7	Belgium	27 June 1951
8	Denmark	27 June 1951
9	Peru	28 June 1951
10	United States	2 July 1951
11	Brazil	10 July 1951
12	France	11 July 1951
13	Greece	12 July 1951
14	Ireland	26 July 1951
15	South Africa	14 August 1951
16	Italy	4 September 1951
17	Pakistan	15 October 1951
18	Monaco	16 October 1951
19	Canada	8 November 1951
20	Serbia	8 December 1951
21	Panama	17 December 1951
22	Argentina	30 December 1951
23	Uruguay	9 January 1952
24	Australia	28 January 1952
25	Chile	4 February 1952
26	Iran	26 February 1952
27	Nicaragua	10 April 1952
28	Japan	19 April 1952
29	Venezuela	28 April 1952
30	Switzerland	6 May 1952
31	Liechtenstein	6 May 1952
32	Thailand	28 May 1952
33	Turkey	21 June 1952
34	Indonesia	25 June 1952
35	Iceland	10 July 1952
36	Ecuador	14 July 1952
37	El Salvador	25 August 1952
38	Mexico	29 August 1952
39	Paraguay	1 October 1952
40	Costa Rica	7 October 1952
41	Syria	14 October 1952
42	Egypt	16 October 1952
43	Portugal	10 November 1952
44	Spain	16 November 1952
45	Jordan	17 November 1952
46	Bolivia	30 December 1952
47	Colombia	13 January 1953
48	Lebanon	20 May 1953
49	Liberia	23 July 1953
50	Dominican Republic	11 September 1953
51	Iraq	19 September 1953
52	Haiti	23 September 1953
53	New Zealand	10 November 1953
54	Sri Lanka	9 December 1953
55	Ethiopia	23 January 1954
—	Holy See	1 June 1954
56	Myanmar	3 August 1954
57	Philippines	8 October 1954
58	Saudi Arabia	10 November 1954
59	Afghanistan	22 December 1954
60	Libya	3 June 1955
61	Cuba	30 June 1955
62	Russia	13 September 1955
63	Austria	5 January 1956
64	Sudan	12 March 1956
65	Tunisia	7 December 1956
66	Morocco	26 March 1957
67	South Korea	25 May 1957
68	Ghana	24 June 1957
69	Malaysia	31 August 1957
70	Laos	31 January 1958
71	Nepal	23 April 1958
72	Guinea	30 July 1959
73	Guatemala	9 October 1959
74	Cameroon	1 January 1960
75	Honduras	20 January 1960
76	Burkina Faso	31 January 1960
77	Togo	27 April 1960
78	Madagascar	26 June 1960
79	Democratic Republic of the Congo	30 June 1960
80	Somalia	1 July 1960
81	Ivory Coast	7 August 1960
82	Chad	11 August 1960
83	Republic of the Congo	15 August 1960
84	Cyprus	20 August 1960
85	Mali	23 September 1960
86	Senegal	23 September 1960
87	Nigeria	1 October 1960
88	Mauritania	28 November 1960
89	Central African Republic	1 December 1960
90	Sierra Leone	27 August 1961
91	Tanzania	9 December 1961
92	Gabon	13 April 1962
93	Algeria	3 July 1962
94	Jamaica	6 August 1962
95	Uganda	9 October 1962
96	Benin	15 October 1962
97	Yemen	24 October 1962
98	Niger	11 January 1963
99	Burundi	24 January 1963
100	Trinidad and Tobago	28 August 1963
101	Rwanda	13 December 1963
102	Kenya	18 December 1963
103	Cambodia	19 February 1964
104	Kuwait	20 May 1964
105	Zambia	24 October 1964
106	Malta	4 December 1964
107	Gambia	26 April 1965
108	Israel	10 May 1965
109	Malawi	24 September 1965
110	Singapore	6 November 1965
111	Botswana	1 October 1966
112	Maldives	10 October 1966
113	Barbados	30 November 1966
114	Romania	31 January 1967
115	Guyana	14 March 1967
116	Lesotho	15 February 1968
117	Mauritius	23 March 1968
118	Eswatini	15 November 1968
119	Bangladesh	4 February 1972
120	Oman	16 May 1972
121	Bahrain	17 May 1972
122	United Arab Emirates	17 May 1972
123	Poland	14 September 1972
124	China	11 October 1972
125	Finland	7 January 1973
126	Qatar	15 January 1973
127	Bahamas	10 July 1973
128	Fiji	1 August 1973
129	Czech Republic	11 December 1973
130	Bulgaria	21 December 1973
131	Hungary	21 December 1973
132	Mongolia	31 January 1974
133	Grenada	6 February 1974
134	Guinea-Bissau	17 April 1974
135	Mozambique	25 June 1975
136	São Tomé and Príncipe	12 July 1975
137	Vietnam	23 September 1975
138	Suriname	25 November 1975
139	Tonga	1 May 1976
140	Samoa	18 May 1976
141	Papua New Guinea	16 September 1976
142	Seychelles	18 January 1977
143	Djibouti	23 January 1978
144	Comoros	2 February 1978
145	Solomon Islands	11 July 1978
146	Tuvalu	26 June 1979
147	Angola	16 August 1979
148	Zimbabwe	18 April 1980
149	Cape Verde	2 June 1980
150	Saint Vincent and the Grenadines	13 June 1980
151	Kiribati	1 July 1980
152	Saint Lucia	1 August 1980
153	Dominica	9 December 1980
154	Vanuatu	22 April 1981
155	Belize	1 March 1982
156	Antigua and Barbuda	11 March 1982
157	Brunei	30 January 1984
158	Saint Kitts and Nevis	27 August 1984
159	Nauru	20 September 1984
160	Albania	2 October 1987
161	Namibia	21 March 1990
162	Estonia	28 August 1991
163	Latvia	28 August 1991
164	Lithuania	28 August 1991
165	Marshall Islands	23 September 1991
166	Croatia	15 January 1992
167	Slovenia	15 January 1992
168	Ukraine	17 January 1992
169	Armenia	31 January 1992
170	Kyrgyzstan	3 February 1992
171	Kazakhstan	11 February 1992
172	Azerbaijan	20 February 1992
173	Tajikistan	28 February 1992
174	Turkmenistan	6 March 1992
175	Uzbekistan	6 March 1992
176	Belarus	13 March 1992
177	Georgia	13 April 1992
178	Federated States of Micronesia	21 April 1992
179	Moldova	30 April 1992
180	Bosnia and Herzegovina	13 November 1992
181	Slovakia	1 January 1993
182	Eritrea	3 August 1993
183	North Macedonia	16 December 1993
184	Andorra	8 March 1994
185	San Marino	1 October 1995
186	Palau	11 November 1997
187	North Korea	1 March 2001
—	Cook Islands	11 September 2001
188	Timor-Leste	20 May 2002
189	Montenegro	14 June 2006
—	Kosovo	21 February 2008
190	Equatorial Guinea	6 September 2010
191	South Sudan	9 July 2011
—	Sovereign Military Order of Malta	15 November 2017
192	Bhutan	25 November 2020
—	Niue	3 February 2026

== Bilateral relations ==
=== Africa ===
Country	Notes
Algeria	See Algeria–Germany relations: Algeria has an embassy in Berlin and a consulate-general in Frankfurt.; Germany has an embassy in Algiers.
Angola	See Angola–Germany relations: Angola has an embassy in Berlin.; Germany has an embassy in Luanda.
Benin	Benin has an embassy in Berlin.; Germany has an embassy in Cotonou.
Botswana	See Germany–Botswana relations: Botswana has an embassy in Berlin.; Germany has an embassy in Gaborone.
Burkina Faso	Burkina Faso has an embassy in Berlin.; Germany has an embassy in Ouagadougou.
Burundi	See Burundi–Germany relations: Burundi has an embassy in Berlin.; Germany has an embassy in Bujumbura.
Cape Verde	Cape Verde has an embassy in Berlin.; Germany is represented in Cape Verde through its embassy in Senegal.
Cameroon	See Cameroon–Germany relations: Cameroon has an embassy in Berlin.; Germany has an embassy in Yaoundé.
Central African Republic	See Central African Republic–Germany relations: The Central African Republic is represented in Germany through its embassy in France.; Following the closing of the German embassy in Bangui in 1997 Germany is represented through its embassy in Cameroon.
Chad	See Chad–Germany relations: Chad has an embassy in Berlin.; Germany has an embassy in N'Djamena.
Comoros	Comoros is represented in Germany through its embassy in Belgium.; Germany is represented in Comoros through its embassy in Tanzania.
Democratic Republic of the Congo	See Democratic Republic of the Congo–Germany relations: DR Congo has an embassy in Berlin.; Germany has an embassy in Kinshasa.
Republic of the Congo	Republic of the Congo has an embassy in Berlin.; Germany has an embassy in Brazzaville.
Egypt	See Egypt–Germany relations: Egypt has an embassy in Berlin and consulates-general in Frankfurt and Hamburg.; Germany has an embassy in Cairo.
Eritrea	See Eritrea–Germany relations: Eritrea has an embassy in Berlin and a consulate general in Frankfurt.; Germany has an embassy in Asmara
Equatorial Guinea	See Equatorial Guinea–Germany relations: Equatorial Guinea has an embassy in Berlin.; Following the closing of the German embassy in Malabo in 2021 Germany is represented through its embassy in Equatorial Guinea.
Ethiopia	See Ethiopia–Germany relations: Ethiopia has an embassy in Berlin and a consulate-general in Frankfurt.; Germany has an embassy in Addis Ababa.
Gabon	See Gabon–Germany relations: Gabon has an embassy in Berlin.; Germany has an embassy in Libreville.
Gambia	See The Gambia–Germany relations: Gambia is represented in Germany through its embassy in Belgium.; Germany has an embassy in Banjul.
Ghana	See Germany–Ghana relations: Ghana has an embassy in Berlin.; Germany has an embassy in Accra.
Guinea	See Germany–Guinea relations: Germany has an embassy in Conakry; Guinea has an embassy in Berlin
Kenya	See Germany–Kenya relations: Germany has an embassy in Nairobi.; Kenya has an embassy in Berlin.
Liberia	See Germany–Liberia relations: Liberia has an embassy in Berlin.; Germany has an embassy in Monrovia.
Libya	See Germany–Libya relations: Libya has an embassy in Berlin and a consulate-general in Frankfurt.; Germany has an embassy in Tripoli
Madagascar	See Germany–Madagascar relations: Madagascar has an embassy in Berlin.; Germany has an embassy in Antananarivo.
Malawi	See Germany–Malawi relations: Malawi has an embassy in Berlin.; Germany has an embassy in Lilongwe.
Mali	See Germany–Mali relations: Mali has an embassy in Berlin.; Germany has an embassy in Bamako.
Mauritania	See Germany–Mauritania relations Both countries established diplomatic relations on 28 November 1960 when has been accredited first Ambassador of FRG to Mauritania with residence in Dakar, M. Reichhold. On 6 May 1961 first Ambassador of Mauritania to FRG M. Mamadou Toure presented his credentials to President Lubke.: Mauritania has an embassy in Berlin.; Germany has an embassy in Nouakchott.
Morocco	See Germany–Morocco relations: Morocco has an embassy in Berlin and consulates-general in Düsseldorf and Frankfurt.; Germany has an embassy in Rabat.
Mozambique	See Germany–Mozambique relations: Mozambique has an embassy in Berlin.; Germany has an embassy in Maputo.
Namibia	See Germany–Namibia relations: Namibia has an embassy in Berlin.; Germany has an embassy in Windhoek.
Niger	See Germany–Niger relations: Niger has an embassy in Berlin.; Germany has an embassy in Niamey.
Nigeria	See Germany–Nigeria relations: Nigeria has an embassy in Berlin and a consulate-general in Frankfurt.; Germany has an embassy in Abuja and a consulate-general in Lagos.
Rwanda	See Germany–Rwanda relations: Rwanda has an embassy in Berlin.; Germany has an embassy in Kigali.
São Tomé and Príncipe	São Tomé and Príncipe is represented in Germany through its embassy in Belgium.; Germany is represented in São Tomé and Príncipe though its embassy in Gabon.
Senegal	See Germany–Senegal relations: Senegal has an embassy in Berlin.; Germany has an embassy in Dakar.
Sierra Leone	See Germany–Sierra Leone relations: Sierra Leone has an embassy in Berlin.; Germany has an embassy in Freetown.
Somalia	See Germany–Somalia relations: Somalia has an embassy in Berlin.; Germany is represented in Somalia through its embassy in Kenya.
South Africa	See Germany–South Africa relations: South Africa has an embassy in Berlin and a consulate-general in Munich.; Germany has an embassy in Pretoria and a consulate-general in Cape Town.
South Sudan	See Germany–South Sudan relations: South Sudan has an embassy in Berlin.; Germany closed its embassy in Juba from 22 March 2025 to 09 June 2025.
Sudan	See Germany–Sudan relations: Sudan has an embassy in Berlin.; Due to the war in Sudan, Germany closed its embassy in Khartoum in 2023.
Tanzania	See Germany–Tanzania relations: Tanzania has an embassy in Berlin.; Germany has an embassy in Dar-es-Salaam.
Togo	See Germany–Togo relations: Togo has an embassy in Berlin.; Germany has an embassy in Lomé.
Tunisia	Tunisia has an embassy in Berlin, a consulate-general in Bonn, and consulates in Hamburg and Munich.; Germany has an embassy in Tunis.
Uganda	See Germany–Uganda relations: Uganda has an embassy in Berlin.; Germany has an embassy in Kampala.
Zambia	Zambia has an embassy in Berlin.; Germany has an embassy in Lusaka.
Zimbabwe	See Germany–Zimbabwe relations: Zimbabwe has an embassy in Berlin.; Germany has an embassy in Harare.

=== Americas ===
Country	Notes
Antigua and Barbuda	Antigua and Barbuda is represented in Germany through its embassy in the United Kingdom.; Germany is represented in Antigua and Barbuda through its embassy in Trinidad and Tobago.
Argentina	See Argentina–Germany relations: Argentina has an embassy in Berlin, consulates-general in Frankfurt and Hamburg, and a consulate in Bonn.; Germany has an embassy in Buenos Aires.; See also: German Argentine
Bahamas	The Bahamas is represented in Germany through its embassy in the United Kingdom.; Germany is represented in the Bahamas through its embassy in Jamaica.
Barbados	See Barbados–Germany relations: Barbados is represented in Germany through its embassy in Brussels (Belgium).; Germany is represented in Barbados from its embassy in Port of Spain (Trinidad and Tobago).
Belize	See Belize–Germany relations: Belize is represented in Germany through its embassy in Brussels.; Germany is represented in Belize through its embassy in Guatemala.
Bolivia	See Bolivia–Germany relations: Diplomatic relations between the two states were broken during the First World War.; Relations were restored after the war under the agreement concluded on 20 July 1921.; Bolivia has an embassy in Berlin.; Germany has an embassy in La Paz.; See also: German Bolivians
Brazil	See Brazil–Germany relations: Brazil has an embassy in Berlin and consulates-general in Frankfurt and Munich.; Germany has an embassy in Brasília and consulates-general in Porto Alegre, Recife, Rio de Janeiro and São Paulo.; See also: German Brazilian
Canada	See Canada–Germany relations Canada operates consulates in Munich and Düsseldorf. In addition to its embassy in Ottawa, Germany maintains consulates in Toronto, Montreal and Vancouver.
Chile	See Chile–Germany relations: Chile has an embassy in Berlin, consulates-general in Frankfurt, Hamburg, and Munich and honorary consulates in Bremen, Cologne and Stuttgart.; Germany has an embassy in Santiago and honorary consulates in Antofagasta, Concepción, La Serena, Puerto Montt, Punta Arenas, Temuco, Valdivia, and Vina del Mar.
Colombia	See Colombia–Germany relations: Colombia has an embassy in Berlin, a consulate-general in Frankfurt and three honorary consulates in Bremen, Hamburg and Stuttgart.; Germany has an embassy in Bogotá and four honorary consulates in Armenia, Barranquilla, Cali, and Medellín.
Costa Rica	See Costa Rica–Germany relations: Costa Rica has an embassy in Berlin.; Germany has an embassy in San José.
Cuba	See Cuba–Germany relations: Cuba has an embassy in Berlin and an embassy outpost in Bonn.; Germany has an embassy in Havana.; The Federal Republic of Germany Germany ended diplomatic relations on January 14, 1963, due to the Hallstein Doctrine, two days after Cuba recognized the German Democratic Republic.; Diplomatic relations were re-established on 18 January 1975.
Dominica	Dominica is represented in Germany through its embassy in London.; Germany is represented in Dominica through its embassy in Trinidad and Tobago.
Dominican Republic	See Dominican Republic–Germany relations: The Dominican Republic has an embassy in Berlin and consulates-general in Frankfurt and Hamburg.; Germany has an embassy in Santo Domingo.
Ecuador	See Ecuador–Germany relations: Ecuador has an embassy in Berlin and a consulate in Hamburg.; Germany has an embassy in Quito.
El Salvador	See El Salvador–Germany relations: El Salvador has an embassy in Berlin.; Germany has an embassy in San Salvador.
Grenada	Grenada has closed its embassy in Germany on 17 August 2013.; Germany is represented in Grenada through its embassy in Trinidad and Tobago.
Guatemala	See Germany–Guatemala relations: Guatemala has an embassy in Berlin.; Germany has an embassy in Guatemala City.
Guyana	See Germany–Guyana relations: Guyana is represented in Germany through its embassy in Brussels.; Germany is represented in Guyana through its embassy in Trinidad and Tobago.
Haiti	See Germany–Haiti relations: Haiti has an embassy in Berlin.; Germany has an embassy in Port-au-Prince.
Honduras	See Germany–Honduras relations: Honduras has an embassy in Berlin.; Germany has an embassy in Tegucigalpa.
Jamaica	See Germany–Jamaica relations: Jamaica has an embassy in Berlin.; Germany has an embassy in Kingston.
Mexico	See Germany–Mexico relations: Mexico has an embassy in Berlin and a consulate in Frankfurt.; Germany has an embassy in Mexico City.; See also: German immigration to Mexico
Nicaragua	See Germany–Nicaragua relations: Nicaragua has an embassy in Berlin.; Germany has an embassy in Managua.
Panama	Panama has an embassy in Berlin and a consulate-general in Hamburg.; Germany has an embassy in Panama City.
Paraguay	See Germany–Paraguay relations: Paraguay has an embassy in Berlin and a consulate-general in Frankfurt.; Germany has an embassy in Asunción and three honorary consulates in Ciudad del Este, Encarnación, and Neu-Halbstadt.; A few towns, like that of Filadelfia and Nueva Germania, were founded by Germans, and still retain some Germans. Alfredo Stroessner, the dictator of Paraguay for 35 years, had a German immigrant father.; List of ambassadors of Paraguay to Germany; See also: Germans in Paraguay.
Peru	See Germany–Peru relations: Peru has an embassy in Berlin and consulates-general in Hamburg, Munich and Offenbach.; Germany has an embassy in Lima, and honorary consulates in Arequipa, Piura, Bagua, and Trujillo.; Formal diplomatic relations between the two countries have existed since the 19th century. These were severed on January 26, 1943, during World War II, and resumed on 28 June 1951 (only with the Federal Republic of Germany).; See also: German Peruvians
St. Kitts and Nevis	St. Kitts and Nevis is represented in Germany through its High Commission in the United Kingdom.; Germany is represented in St. Kitts and Nevis through its embassy in Trinidad and Tobago.
St. Lucia	St. Lucia is represented in Germany through its High Commission in the United Kingdom.; Germany is represented in St. Lucia through its embassy in Trinidad and Tobago.
St. Vincent and the Grenadines	St. Vincent and the Grenadines is represented in Germany through its High Commission in the United Kingdom.; Germany is represented in St. Vincent and the Grenadines through its embassy in Trinidad and Tobago.
Suriname	See Germany–Suriname relations: Suriname is represented in Germany through its embassy in the Netherlands.; Germany is represented in Suriname through its embassy in Trinidad and Tobago.
Trinidad and Tobago	Trinidad and Tobago is represented in Germany through its High Commission in the United Kingdom.; Germany has an embassy in Port of Spain.
United States	See Germany–United States relations US President Joe Biden with German President Frank-Walter Steinmeier in London, October 2024 Former chancellor Angela Merkel has sought warmer relations with the United States and to rebuild political ties on common values and beliefs.: United States has an embassy in Berlin, an embassy outpost in Bonn, consulates-general in Düsseldorf, Frankfurt, Hamburg, Leipzig and Munich, as well as a consular agency in Bremen.; Germany has an embassy in Washington, D.C., and consulates-general in Atlanta, Boston, Chicago, Houston, Los Angeles, Miami, New York City and San Francisco.; See also: German American
Uruguay	See Germany–Uruguay relations: Uruguay has an embassy in Berlin, a general consulate in Hamburg and five honorary consulate (in Bremen, Frankfurt am Main, Essen, Munich, and Stuttgart).; Germany has an embassy in Montevideo.; Germany is Uruguay's principal trading partner in the European Union.
Venezuela	See Germany–Venezuela relations: Venezuela has an embassy in Berlin and consulates-general in Frankfurt and Hamburg.; Germany has an embassy in Caracas.

=== Asia ===
Country	Notes
Afghanistan	See Afghanistan–Germany relations: Germany was one of the first nations to recognise Afghan sovereignty, following the Soviet Union in 1991.; Afghanistan has an embassy in Berlin and consulates-general in Bonn and Grünwald.; Germany had an embassy in Kabul and a consulate-general in Mazar-i-Sharif.; Afghanistan and Germany established close ties in 1935, as Afghanistan sought to break from their historical patterns of British and Russian alignment. Afghanistan resisted calls from Moscow and London to expel the Italian and German diplomatic corps for most of World War II.
Armenia	See Armenia–Germany relations Armenian-German relations have always been stable and solid; they continue to work together and advance through the years in cooperation. Their leaders have discussed bilateral relations and noted that they have considerably improved over the last few years.: Armenia has an embassy in Berlin and honorary consulates in Frankfurt, Karlsruhe, Magdeburg, and Munich.; Germany has an embassy in Yerevan and an honorary consulate in Gyumri.
Azerbaijan	See Azerbaijan–Germany relations: Azerbaijan has an embassy in Berlin.; Germany has an embassy in Baku.
Bahrain	See Bahrain–Germany relations: Bahrain has an embassy in Berlin.; Germany has an embassy in Manama.
Bangladesh	Main articles: Bangladesh–Germany relations and Foreign relations of Bangladesh § Federal Republic of Germany After the independence of Bangladesh in 1971 East Germany was the third country in the world, and the first country in Europe, to officially recognise Bangladesh in 1972. Bangladesh also warmly greeted German reunification. As an economic power as well as an important member of the European Union (EU), Germany is a reliable partner of Bangladesh in development cooperation. After establishment of diplomatic relations, the bilateral relations between the two countries began to grow steadily. Bangladesh is a priority partner country of German Development Cooperation (GTZ). In trade with Germany, Bangladesh has for years recorded a large surplus. Germany is the second largest export market of Bangladesh after the US. The cultural relationship of both the countries is very strong. The cultural cooperation between them is mainly channeled through the Goethe Institute that work on developing the cultural ties between both the countries by sponsoring local and German cultural activities. Both Germany and Bangladesh share common views on various international issues and work together in the UN and in other international forum. They have maintained and developed close and friendly relations in a wide range of field. The two countries are harmonized together by their commitment to various sectors mutually agreed upon, which is expected to be strengthened further in future.: Bangladesh has an embassy in Berlin.; Germany has an embassy in Dhaka.
Bhutan	The Governments of the Federal Republic of Germany and the Kingdom of Bhutan have maintained diplomatic relations since 25 November 2020. This move further deepened the friendly relations between the two countries. Consular relations have been in place since July 2000. Bhutan has agreed to let Germany set up an honorary consulate in Thimphu. Bhutan has an honorary consulate-general in Germany.: Bhutan is represented in Germany through its mission to the EU in Brussels.; Germany is represented in Bhutan through its embassy in India.
Brunei	See Brunei–Germany relations: Brunei has an embassy in Berlin; Germany has an embassy in Bandar Seri Begawan.
Cambodia	See Cambodia–Germany relations: Cambodia has an embassy in Berlin.; Germany has an embassy in Phnom Penh.
China	See China–Germany relations Germany has good relationships with the People's Republic of China, even though Angela Merkel and large parts of Germany's political class have recently criticised the People's Republic for holding back reforms in the field of democracy and human rights. In recent years trade between them has reached high volumes, both in imports and exports. In July 2019, the UN ambassadors from 22 nations, including Germany, signed a joint letter to the UNHRC condemning China's mistreatment of the Uyghurs as well as its mistreatment of other minority groups, urging the Chinese government to close the Xinjiang re-education camps.: China has an embassy in Berlin, an embassy outpost in Bonn, consulates-general in Düsseldorf, Frankfurt, Hamburg, Munich, and an Economic and Trade Office of the Special Administrative Region of Hong Kong.; Germany has an embassy in Beijing and consulates-general in Chengdu, Hong Kong, Guangzhou, Shanghai, and Shenyang.
Hong Kong	See Germany–Hong Kong relations There are no formal diplomatic relations between Hong Kong and Germany, due to the character of Hong Kong being a Special Administrative Region and not an independent nation.: Hong Kong has an Economic and Trade Office in Berlin.; Germany has a consulate-general in Hong Kong.; See also: Chinese-German relations.
India	Main articles: Germany–India relations and Foreign relations of India § Germany During the Cold War India maintained diplomatic relations with both West Germany and East Germany. Since the fall of the Berlin Wall, and the reunification of Germany, relations have further improved. The German ambassador to India, Bernd Mutzelburg, once said that India and Germany, are not just 'natural partners', but important countries in a globalised world. Germany is India's largest trade partner in Europe. German Chancellor Angela Merkel visited India recently, as did the Indian Prime Minister Narendra Modi visit Germany. Both countries have been working towards gaining permanent seats in the United Nations Security Council. As both countries are strong liberal democracies, they have similar objectives. UN reforms, fighting terrorism and climate change, and promotion of science, education, technology, and human rights, are some areas of shared interests, and collaboration between these two countries. Culturally too, Indian and German writers and philosophers, have influenced each other. Recently, Germany has invested in developing education and skills amongst rural Indians. Germany was one of the first countries to agree with the Indo-US Nuclear deal.: India have an embassy in Berlin and three consulate generals in Frankfurt, Munich, and Hamburg.; Germany has an embassy in New Delhi and four consulate generals in Bangalore, Chennai, Kolkata and Mumbai.
Indonesia	See Germany–Indonesia relations: Indonesia and Germany has traditionally enjoyed good, intensive and wide-ranging relations.; Germany and Indonesia, as the largest members of the European Union and the Association of Southeast Asian Nations (ASEAN), respectively, take similar positions on many issues relating to the development of the two regional organizations.; Indonesia has an embassy in Berlin and consulates-general in Frankfurt and Hamburg.; Germany has an embassy in Jakarta.
Iran	See Germany–Iran relations: Iran has an embassy in Berlin and consulates-general in Frankfurt, Hamburg, and Munich.; Germany has an embassy in Tehran.
Iraq	See Germany–Iraq relations: Iraq has an embassy in Berlin and a consulate-general in Frankfurt.; Germany has an embassy in Baghdad and a consulate-general in Erbil.; There are currently some 84,000–150,000 Iraqis living in Germany.
Israel	See Germany–Israel relations Germany-Israel relations refers to the special relationship between Israel and Germany based on shared beliefs, Western values and a combination of historical perspectives. Among the most important factors in their relations is Nazi Germany's role in the genocide of European Jews during the Holocaust. Following German history during the Holocaust, one of Postwar Germany's aims was to establish and maintain relations of Wiedergutmachung with the State of Israel. Starting with the Reparations Agreement in 1952, support for the national security of the State of Israel is central to German foreign policy. Germany has been actively involved in the Egypt–Israel peace treaty in 1979, the Oslo Accords (1993) which led to the Israel–Jordan peace treaty in 1994 and the continuing Israeli–Palestinian peace process which make Germany arguably (next to the United States) Israel's closest ally.: Israel has an embassy in Berlin and a consulate-general in Munich.; Germany has an embassy in Tel Aviv.; See also: History of the Jews in Germany
Japan	See Germany–Japan relations Regular meetings between the two countries have led to several cooperations. In 2004 German Chancellor Gerhard Schröder and Prime Minister Junichiro Koizumi agreed upon cooperations in the assistance for reconstruction of Iraq and Afghanistan, the promotion of economic exchange activities, youth and sports exchanges as well as exchanges and cooperation in science, technology and academic fields. After China, Japan is Germany's principal trading partner in Asia in 2006.: Japan has an embassy in Berlin and consulates-general in Düsseldorf, Frankfurt, Hamburg, and Munich.; Germany has an embassy in Tokyo and a consulate-general in Osaka.
Jordan	See Germany–Jordan relations: Jordan has an embassy in Berlin.; Germany has an embassy in Amman and an honorary consulate in Aqaba.
Kazakhstan	See Germany–Kazakhstan relations: Kazakhstan and Germany have established partnerships in the energy, technology and raw materials sectors.; Germany has a national pavilion at the Astana Expo 2017.; Kazakhstan has an embassy in Berlin, an embassy outpost in Bonn, a consultaetegeneral in Frankfurt, and a consulate in Munich.; Germany has an embassy in Astana and a consulate-general in Almaty.
Kuwait	See Germany–Kuwait relations: Kuwait has an embassy in Berlin and a consulate-general in Frankfurt.; Germany has an embassy in Kuwait City.
Kyrgyzstan	Kyrgyzstan has an embassy in Berlin, an embassy outpost in Bonn, and a consulate in Frankfurt.; Germany has an embassy in Bishkek.
Laos	See Germany–Laos relations: Laos has an embassy in Berlin.; Germany has an embassy in Vientiane.
Lebanon	See Germany–Lebanon relations: Lebanon has an embassy in Berlin.; Germany has an embassy in Beirut.
Malaysia	See Germany–Malaysia relations: Malaysia has an embassy in Berlin and a consulate-general in Frankfurt.; Germany has an embassy in Kuala Lumpur.
Maldives	See Germany–Maldives relations: The Maldives have an embassy in Berlin.; Germany is represented in the Maldives through its embassy in Sri Lanka.
Mongolia	See Germany–Mongolia relations: Mongolia has an embassy in Berlin.; Germany has an embassy in Ulaanbaatar.
Nepal	See Germany–Nepal relations: Nepal has an embassy in Berlin.; Germany has an embassy in Kathmandu.
North Korea	See Germany–North Korea relations: North Korea has an embassy in Berlin.; Germany has an embassy in Pyongyang.
Oman	See Germany–Oman relations: Oman has an embassy in Berlin.; Germany has an embassy in Muscat.
Pakistan	See Germany–Pakistan relations Pakistan and Germany enjoy extremely close, warm and historical relations. Germany is Pakistan's fourth largest trading partner and biggest trading partner in the EU. Germany has been a reliable partner in trade, development, military, scientific and cultural co-operation. The collaboration between Germany and Pakistan dates back to the creation of Pakistan. Germany is home to 53,668 Pakistani immigrants.: Pakistan has an embassy in Berlin, a consulate-general in Frankfurt, and honorary consulates in Frankfurt, Düsseldorf, Hamburg, and Isartal.; Germany has an embassy in Islamabad, a consulate-general in Karachi, and an honorary consulate in Lahore.; See also Pakistanis in Germany
(Palestine) "Palestinian territories" (Note: The Federal Republic of Germany does not recognised the State of Palestine as an independent and sovereign state.)	See Germany–Palestine relations: Palestine has a representative office in Berlin.; Germany has a representative office in Ramallah.
Philippines	See Germany–Philippines relations The relationship between Germany and the Philippines remains strong and positive. In 1955 an agreement was signed which led to a dynamic cooperation between the two countries.: The Philippines has an embassy in Berlin and a consulate-general in Frankfurt.; Germany has an embassy in Manila.
Qatar	See Germany–Qatar relations: Qatar has an embassy in Berlin, an embassy outpost in Bonn, and a consulate-general in Munich.; Germany has an embassy in Doha.
Saudi Arabia	See Germany–Saudi Arabia relations: Saudi Arabia has an embassy in Berlin and a consulate-general in Frankfurt.; Germany has an embassy in Riyadh and a consulate-general in Jeddah.
Singapore	See Germany–Singapore relations: Singapore has an embassy in Berlin.; Germany has an embassy in Singapore.
South Korea	See Germany–South Korea relations: The establishment of diplomatic relations between the Germany and the Joseon Dynasty of Korea started on 26 November 1883.; The number of the South Koreans living in Germany in 2011 was about 31,000.; South Korea has an embassy in Berlin, an embassy outpost in Bonn, and consulates-general in Frankfurt and Hamburg.; Germany has an embassy in Seoul.; See also: Foreign relations of South Korea#Europe.
Sri Lanka	See Germany–Sri Lanka relations: Sri Lanka has an embassy in Berlin and a consulate-general in Frankfurt.; Germany has an embassy in Colombo.
Syria	See Germany–Syria relations: Syria has an embassy in Berlin.; The German embassy in Damascus reopened on 20 March 2025.; Syria was from 22 February 1958 until 28 September 1961 part of the United Arab Republic. In 1961 Syria left the union with Egypt and re-established its independence.
Taiwan	See Germany–Taiwan relations Germany has maintained and expanded economic and informal ties with Taiwan while balancing its relationship with the PRC.: Taiwan has a representative office based in Berlin, in addition to offices in Frankfurt, Hamburg and Munich.; Germany has a representative office in Taipei.
Tajikistan	See Germany–Tajikistan relations: Tajikistan has an embassy in Berlin.; Germany has an embassy in Dushanbe.
Thailand	See Germany–Thailand relations: Thailand has an embassy in Berlin and consulates-general in Frankfurt and Munich.; Germany has an embassy in Bangkok.
Turkey	See Germany–Turkey relations Good Turkish/Ottoman-German relations from the 19th century onwards. They were allies in First World War. Germany promoted Turkish immigration after 1945 when it suffered an acute labor shortage. They were called Gastarbeiter (German for guest workers). Most Turks in Germany trace their ancestry to Central and Eastern Anatolia. Today, Turks are Germany's largest ethnic minority and form most of Germany's Muslim minority. Berlin is home to about 250,000 Turks, making it the largest Turkish community outside of Turkey.: Turkey has an embassy in Berlin and consulates-general in Berlin, Düsseldorf, Essen, Frankfurt, Hamburg, Hannover, Hürth, Karlsruhe, Mainz, Munich, Münster, Nuremberg, and Stuttgart.; Germany has an embassy in Ankara, consulates-general in Istanbul and İzmir, and a consulate in Antalya.; Both countries are full members of the Council of Europe and of NATO.; Germany is an EU member and Turkey is an EU candidate. Germany opposes Turkey's accession negotiations to the EU, although negotiations have now been suspended.
Turkmenistan	Turkmenistan has an embassy in Berlin and a consulate in Frankfurt.; Germany has an embassy in Ashgabat.
United Arab Emirates	See Germany–United Arab Emirates relations: UAE has an embassy in Berlin and consulates-general in Bonn and Munich.; Germany has an embassy in Abu Dhabi and a consulate-general in Dubai.
Uzbekistan	See Germany–Uzbekistan relations: Uzbekistan has an embassy in Berlin and a consulate-general in Frankfurt.; Germany has an embassy in Tashkent.
Vietnam	See Germany–Vietnam relations: Vietnam has an embassy in Berlin and a consulate-general in Frankfurt.; Germany has an embassy in Hanoi and a consulate-general in Ho Chi Minh City.
Yemen	See Germany–Yemen relations: Yemen has an embassy in Berlin and a consulate-general in Frankfurt.; Germany has an embassy in Sanaa which at the moment is only working to a limited extend due to the civil war.

=== Europe ===
Balkans

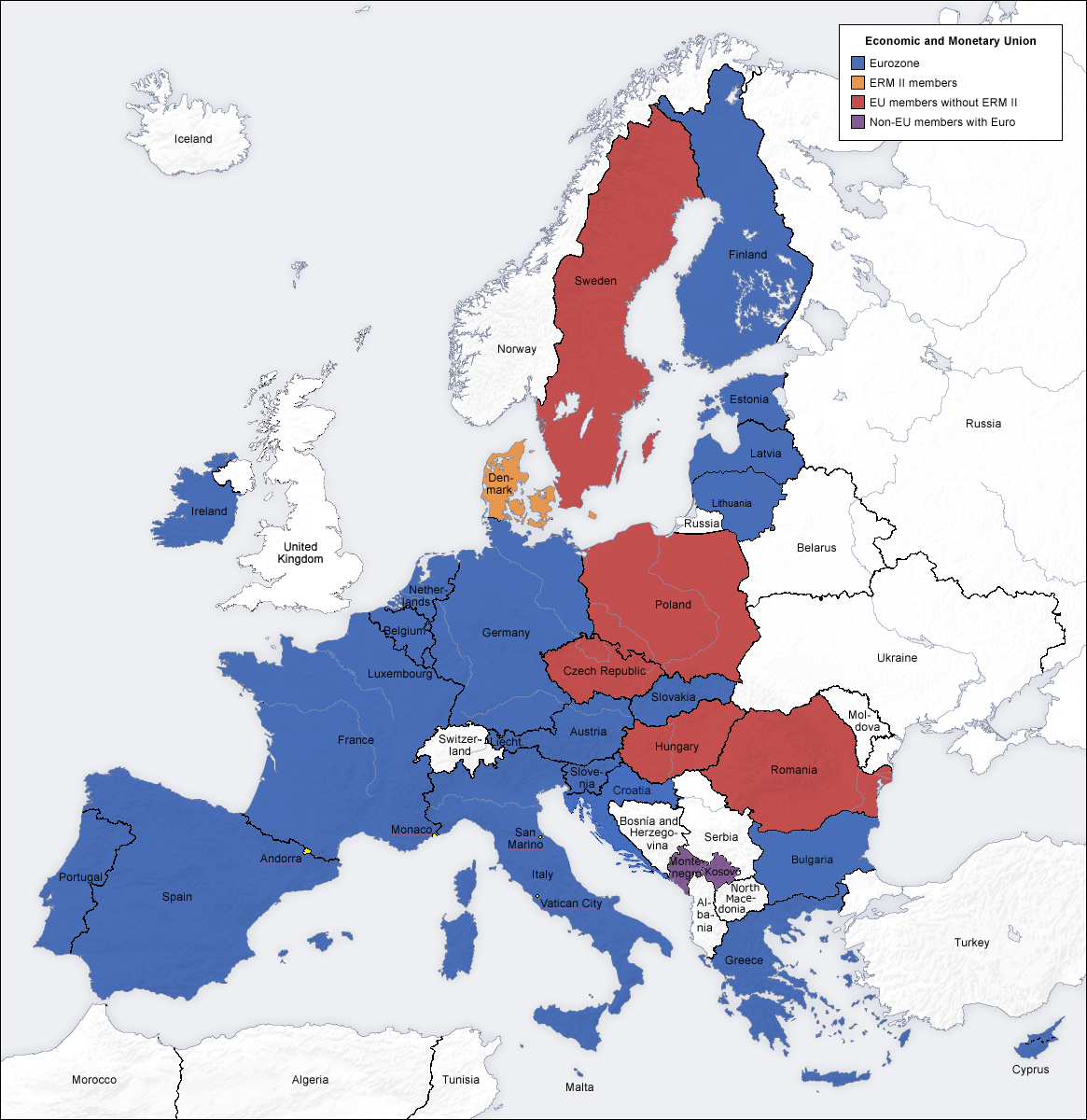
The European Union and the eurozone

The German government was a strong supporter of the enlargement of NATO.

Germany was one of the first nations to recognize Croatia and Slovenia as independent nations, rejecting the concept of Yugoslavia as the only legitimate political order in the Balkans (unlike other European powers, who first proposed a pro-Belgrade policy). This is why Serb authorities sometimes referred to "new German imperialism" as one of the main reasons for Yugoslavia's collapse. German troops participate in the multinational efforts to bring "peace and stability" to the Balkans.

Central Europe

Weimar triangle (France, Germany and Poland); Germany continues to be active economically in the states of Central Europe, and to actively support the development of democratic institutions. In the 2000s, Germany has been arguably the centerpiece of the European Union (though the importance of France cannot be overlooked in this connection).

Country	Notes
Albania	See Albania-Germany relations: Albania has an embassy in Berlin and a consulate-general in Munich.; Germany has an embassy in Tirana.; Both countries are full members of NATO.; Albania is an EU candidate and Germany is an EU member.; See also: Albanians in Germany
Andorra	Andorra is accredited to Germany from its embassy in Vienna, Austria.; Germany is accredited to Andorra from its embassy in Madrid, Spain.
Austria	See Austria–Germany relations Relations between them are close because as countries have strong historical and cultural ties.: Austria has an embassy in Berlin and a consulate-general in Munich.; Germany has an embassy in Vienna.; Both countries are full members of the European Union and of the Council of Europe.
Belarus	See Belarus-Germany relations: Belarus has an embassy in Berlin and a consulate-general in Munich.; Germany has an embassy in Minsk.
Belgium	See Belgium–Germany relations: Belgium has an embassy in Berlin.; Germany has an embassy in Brussels.; Both countries are full members of the European Union and NATO.
Bosnia and Herzegovina	See Bosnia and Herzegovina–Germany relations The German government has made continuous efforts concerning the peace process after the civil war.: Bosnia and Herzegovina has an embassy in Berlin and consulates-general in Frankfurt, Munich, and Stuttgart.; Germany has an embassy in Sarajevo.
Bulgaria	See Bulgaria–Germany relations The Bulgarian government views Germany as its key strategic partner in the EU.: Bulgaria has an embassy in Berlin and consulates-general in Frankfurt and Munich.; Germany has an embassy in Sofia.; Both countries are full members of the European Union and NATO.
Croatia	See Croatia–Germany relations: There are more than 200,000 Croats who live in Germany. Historically Germany has had a close collaboration with Croatia.; Croatia has an embassy in Berlin and consulates-general in Düsseldorf, Frankfurt, Hamburg, Munich and Stuttgart, and honorary consulates in Dresden and Mainz.; Germany has an embassy in Zagreb and an honorary consulate in Osijek.; Both countries are full members of the European Union and NATO.
Cyprus	See Cyprus–Germany relations: In 2004, an agreement on mutual recognition of university degrees was signed, designed to facilitate Cypriot and German students' admission to German and Cypriot universities.; There is a close and trustful cooperation at a government level. Minister of State Hoyer visited Cyprus on 11 and 12 February 2010. Federal Foreign Minister Westerwelle met with his Cypriot counterpart Marcos Kyprianou in Berlin on 2 March.; Cyprus has an embassy in Berlin and a consulate-general in Hamburg.; Germany has an embassy in Nicosia.; Both countries are full members of the European Union and of the Council of Europe.
Czech Republic	See Czech Republic–Germany relations Today, they share 815 km of common borders.: Czech Republic has an embassy in Berlin, consulates-general in Dresden and Munich, a consulate in Düsseldorf, and honorary consulates in Dortmund, Frankfurt, Hamburg, Nuremberg, and Rostock.; Germany has an embassy in Prague.; Both countries are full members of the European Union and NATO.
Denmark	See Denmark–Germany relations: Denmark has an embassy in Berlin and three consulates-general in Flensburg, Hamburg and Munich.; Germany has an embassy in Copenhagen; Both countries are full members of the European Union and NATO.
Estonia	See Estonia–Germany relations: Estonia has an embassy in Berlin.; Germany has an embassy in Tallinn.; Both countries are full members of the European Union and NATO.
Finland	See Finland–Germany relations: Finland has an embassy in Berlin.; Germany has an embassy in Helsinki.; Both countries are full members of the European Union and NATO.; Germany fully supported Finland's application to join NATO, which resulted in membership on 4 April 2023.
France	See France–Germany relations Being the historic core of Europe and the "twin engine for European integration", the cooperation with France is one of the most central elements of German foreign policy. The Elysée Treaty from 1963 set the foundation for a collaboration that – next to the European project – also repeatedly called for a "Core Union" with maximum integration. In recent times, France and Germany are among the most enthusiastic proponents of the further integration of the EU. They are sometimes described as the "twin engine" or "core countries" pushing for moves.: France has an embassy in Berlin and consulates-general in Düsseldorf, Frankfurt, Hamburg, Munich, Saarbrücken, Suttgart.; Germany has an embassy in Paris and consulates-general in Bordeaux, Lyon, Marseille, and Strasbourg.; Both countries are full members of the European Union and NATO.
Greece	See Germany–Greece relations: The first Greek Embassy in Berlin was established in 1834, when Berlin was the capital of the Kingdom of Prussia.; Greece has an embassy in Berlin and consulates-general in Düsseldorf, Frankfurt, Hamburg, Munich, Stuttgart.; Germany has an embassy in Athens and a consulate-general in Thessaloniki.; Both countries are full members of the European Union and NATO.
Georgia	See Georgia–Germany relations: Georgia has an embassy in Berlin and a consulate-general in Frankfurt.; Germany has an embassy in Tbilisi.; Both countries are full members of the Council of Europe.; Georgia is an EU candidate and Germany is an EU member.
Holy See	See Germany–Holy See relations: Holy See has an apostolic nunciature in Berlin.; Germany's embassy to the Holy See is located in Rome.
Hungary	See Germany–Hungary relations: Hungary has an embassy in Berlin, consulates-general in Düsseldorf, Munich, and Stuttgart, an honorary consulate-general in Bremerhaven, and honorary consulates in Dresdener, Erfurt, Essen, Frankfurt, Hamburg, Nuremberg, and Schwerin.; Germany has an embassy in Budapest and an honorary consulate in Pécs.; Both countries are full members of the European Union and NATO.
Iceland	See Germany–Iceland relations: German-Icelandic cultural relations go back more than a thousand years; they share a Germanic cultural background.; Iceland has an embassy in Berlin and nine honorary consulates in Bremen, Cologne, Cuxhaven, Düsseldorf, Frankfurt, Hamburg, Munich, Stuttgart, and Warnemünde.; Germany has an embassy in Reykjavík an honorary consulates in Akureyri and Seyðisfjörður.; Both countries are full members of NATO.
Ireland	See Germany–Ireland relations: As Ireland was neutral during World War II, it was able to maintain diplomatic relations with Germany throughout the war. Nonetheless, at least one Irish merchant vessel was destroyed by a German submarine.; Ireland has an embassy in Berlin and a consulate-general in Frankfurt and honorary consulates in Bergisch Gladbach, Hamburg, Munich, and Stuttgart.; Germany has an embassy in Dublin and an honorary consulate Galway.; Both countries are full members of the European Union and of the Council of Europe.
Italy	See Germany–Italy relations: These two countries were part of the Holy Roman Empire.; The Italian regions of Friuli-Venezia Giulia and South Tyrol were located inside the boundaries of the German Confederation.; Relations were established after the Unification of Italy.; They enjoy friendly relations and were members of the Axis during World War II, formed an alliance during the Cold War (West Germany), and are full members of the European Union and NATO.; Italy has an embassy in Berlin and consulates-generals in Cologne, Frankfurt, Hannover, Munich, and Suttgart, consulates in Freiburg and Dortmund, and a consular agency in Wolfsburg.; Germany has an embassy in Rome and a consulate-general in Milan.; Both countries are full members of the European Union and NATO.
Kosovo	See Germany–Kosovo relations: Kosovo has an embassy in Berlin, consulates-general in Düsseldorf, Frankfurt, Hamburg, Munich, and a consulate in Stuttgart.; Germany has an embassy in Pristina.; Germany is the second-largest donor to Kosovo, behind the United States.
Latvia	See Germany–Latvia relations: Diplomatic relations were first established following Latvia's independence from Russian rule, under agreement signed in Berlin on 15 July 1920. These relation lasted until the Soviet take over of Latvia in 1940.; Relations were reestablished in 1991, following the collapse of the Soviet Union.; Latvia has an embassy in Berlin and honorary consulates in Bremen, Düsseldorf, Frankfurt, Hamburg, Künzelsau, Munich and Rostock.; Germany has an embassy in Riga.; Both countries are full members of the European Union and NATO.
Liechtenstein	See Germany–Liechtenstein relations: Liechtenstein has an embassy in Berlin.; Germany is accredited to Liechtenstein from its embassy in Bern, Switzerland.
Lithuania	See Germany–Lithuania relations: Lithuania has an embassy in Berlin and honorary consulates in Dresden, Erfurt, Essen, Künzelsau, and Munich.; Germany has an embassy in Vilnius and an honorary consulate in Klaipėda.; Both countries are full members of the European Union and NATO.
Luxembourg	See Germany–Luxembourg relations: Luxembourg has an embassy in Berlin.; Germany has an embassy in Luxembourg City.; Both countries are full members of the European Union and NATO.
Malta	See Germany–Malta relations: Malta has an embassy in Berlin.; Germany has an embassy in Valletta.; Both countries are full members of the European Union and of the Council of Europe.
Moldova	See Germany–Moldova relations: Moldova has an embassy in Berlin and a consulate-general in Frankfurt.; Germany has an embassy in Chisinau.; Both countries are full members of the Council of Europe.; Germany is an EU member and Moldova is an EU candidate.
Monaco	Monaco has an embassy in Berlin.; Germany is accredited to Monaco from its embassy in Paris, France.
Montenegro	See Germany–Montenegro relations: Montenegro has an embassy in Berlin and a consulate-general in Frankfurt.; Germany has an embassy in Podgorica.; Both countries are full members of NATO.; Germany is an EU member and Montenegro is an EU candidate.
Netherlands	See Germany–Netherlands relations: Relations were established following the unification of Germany in 1871.; During the First World War, the German army refrained from attacking the Netherlands, and thus relations between the two states were preserved. At war's end in 1918, the former Kaiser Wilhelm II fled to the Netherlands, where he lived till his death in 1941.; The German army occupied the Netherlands during the Second World War and kept the country under occupation in 1940–1945.; Netherlands has an embassy in Berlin and consulates-general in Düsseldorf and Munich.; Germany has an embassy in The Hague and a consulate-general which is at the same time an embassy outpost in Amsterdam.; Both countries are full members of the European Union and NATO.
North Macedonia	See Germany–North Macedonia relations: North Macedonia has an embassy in Berlin, an embassy outpost in Bonn, and a consulate-general in Munich.; Germany has an embassy in Skopje.; Both countries are full members of NATO.; Germany is an EU member and North Macedonia is an EU candidate.
Norway	See Germany–Norway relations: Norway has an embassy in Berlin.; Germany has an embassy in Oslo.; Both countries are full members of NATO.
Poland	See Germany–Poland relations During the Cold War, communist Poland had good relations with East Germany, but had strained relations with West Germany. After the fall of communism, Poland and the reunited Germany have had a mostly positive but occasionally strained relationship due to some political issues. After the collapse of the Soviet Union, Germany has been a proponent of Poland's participation in NATO and the European Union. The Polish-German border is 467 km long.: Poland has an embassy in Berlin and consulates-general in Cologne, Hamburg, and Munich.; Germany has an embassy in Warsaw, consulates-general in Gdańsk, Kraków, Wrocław and a consulate in Opole, which is an outpost of the consulate-general in Wrocław.; Both countries are full members of the European Union and NATO.
Portugal	See Germany–Portugal relations: Portugal has an embassy in Berlin, consulates-general in Düsseldorf, Hamburg, Stuttgart, and an outpost of the consulate-general Stuttgart in Hattersheim am Main.; Germany has an embassy in Lisbon.; Both countries are full members of the European Union and NATO.
Romania	See Germany–Romania relations: Both countries have – due to a formerly significant number of Germans of Romania – also cultural relations.; Romania has an embassy in Berlin and consulates-general in Bonn, Munich, and Stuttgart.; Germany has an embassy in Bucharest and consulates in Sibiu and Timișoara.; Both countries are full members of the European Union and NATO.
Russia	See Germany–Russia relations Germany tries to keep Russia engaged with the rest of the Western world. The future aim is to promote a stable market-economy liberal democracy in Russia, which is part of the Western world.: Russia has an embassy in Berlin.; Germany has an embassy in Moscow and a consulate-general in Saint Petersburg.
San Marino	San Marino is represented in Germany through its Ambassador in San Marino.; Germany is represented in Germany through its embassy in Rome and its consulate-general in Milan.
Serbia	See Germany–Serbia relations: There are 505,000 registered people of Serbian descent living in Germany.; Germans of Serbia today constitute a small minority, but used to be the largest minority in Serbia before World War II.; Serbia has an embassy in Berlin and consulates-general in Düsseldorf, Frankfurt, Hamburg, Munich, and Stuttgart.; Germany has an embassy in Belgrade.; Germany is an EU member and Serbia is an EU candidate.
Slovakia	See Germany–Slovakia relations: Slovakia has an embassy in Berlin, a general consulate in Munich and honorary consulates in Bad Homburg vor der Höhe, Hildesheim, Leipzig, Stuttgart.; Germany has an embassy in Bratislava and honorary consulates in Košice and Žilina.; Both countries are full members of the European Union and NATO.
Slovenia	See Germany–Slovenia relations: Slovenia has an embassy in Berlin, and a consulate-general in Munich.; Germany has an embassy in Ljubljana.; Both countries are full members of the European Union and NATO.
Sovereign Military Order of Malta	Diplomatic relations were established on 15 December 2017; Sovereign Military Order of Malta has an embassy in Berlin.; Germany is represented to Sovereign Military Order of Malta through its Embassy to the Holy See.
Spain	See Germany–Spain relations: Spain has an embassy in Berlin and consulates-general in Düsseldorf, Frankfurt, Hamburg, Munich, and Stuttgart.; Germany has an embassy in Madrid, a consulate-general in Barcelona, and consulates in Las Palmas, Málaga, and Palma de Mallorca.; Both countries are full members of the European Union and NATO.
Sweden	See Germany–Sweden relations: Relations have been strong with cultural and economic cooperation.; Sweden has an embassy in Berlin and 12 honorary consulates.; Germany has an embassy in Stockholm and 8 honorary consulates.; Both countries are full members of the European Union, NATO, and of the Council of Europe.; Germany fully supported Sweden's application to join NATO, which resulted in membership on 7 March 2024.
Switzerland	See Germany–Switzerland relations: Switzerland has an embassy in Berlin and consulates-general in Frankfurt, Munich, and Stuttgart.; Germany has an embassy in Bern.
Ukraine	See Germany–Ukraine relations: Ukraine has an embassy in Berlin and consulates-general in Düsseldorf, Frankfurt, Hamburg and Munich.; Germany has an embassy in Kyiv and a consulate-general in Dnipro.; Both countries are full members of the Council of Europe.; Germany is an EU member and Ukraine is an EU candidate.
United Kingdom	See Germany–United Kingdom relations British Prime Minister Keir Starmer with German President Frank-Walter Steinmeier in London, December 2025 The Federal Republic of Germany established diplomatic relations with the United Kingdom on 20 June 1951.: Germany maintains an embassy in London.; The United Kingdom is accredited to an embassy in Berlin, and consulates generals in Düsseldorf and Munich.; Both countries share common membership of the Council of Europe, the European Court of Human Rights, the G7, the G20, the International Criminal Court, NATO, the OECD, the OSCE, and the World Trade Organization. Bilaterally the two countries have a Double Taxation Convention, and the Kensington Treaty.

=== Oceania ===
Country	Notes
Australia	See Australia–Germany relations: Australia has an embassy in Berlin and a consulate-general in Frankfurt.; Germany has an embassy in Canberra and a consulate-general in Sydney.
Fiji	Fiji is represented in Germany through its embassy in Brussels.; Germany is represented in Fiji through its embassy in New Zealand.
Kiribati	Kiribati has an honorary consulate in Hamburg.; Germany is represented in Kiribati through its embassy in New Zealand.
Marshall Islands	The Marshall Islands is represented in Germany through its permanent mission to the United Nations.; Germany is represented in the Marshall Islands through its embassy in the Philippines.
Micronesia	Micronesia is represented in Germany though its embassy in the United States.; Germany is represented in Germany through its embassy in the Philippines.
Nauru	See Germany–Nauru relations: Nauru is represented in Germany through its consulate-general in Australia.; Germany is represented in Nauru through its embassy in Australia.
New Zealand	See Germany–New Zealand relations: New Zealand has an embassy in Berlin and a consulate-general in Hamburg.; Germany has an embassy in Wellington.
Palau	Palau is represented in Germany through its embassy in the United States.; Germany is represented in Palau through its embassy in the Philippines.
Papua New Guinea	See Germany–Papua New Guinea relations: Papua New Guinea is accredited to Germany from its embassy in Brussels, Belgium.; Germany is accredited to Papua New Guinea from its embassy in Canberra, Australia.
Samoa	See Germany–Samoa relations: Samoa is accredited to Germany from its embassy in Brussels, Belgium.; Germany is accredited to Samoa from its embassy in Wellington, New Zealand.
Solomon Islands	Solomon Islands is represented in Germany through its embassy in Belgium.; Germany is represented in Solomon Islands through its embassy in Australia.
Tonga	See Germany–Tonga relations: Tonga is accredited to Germany from its embassy in London, United Kingdom.; Germany is accredited to Tonga from its embassy in Wellington, New Zealand.
Tuvalu	Tuvalu is represented in Germany through its embassy in Belgium.; Germany is represented in Tuvalu through its embassy in New Zealand.
Vanuatu	Vanuatu is represented in Germany through its embassy in Belgium.; Germany is represented in Vanuatu through its embassy in Australia.

== See also ==
- Anglo-German naval arms race
- Human rights in Germany
- List of diplomatic missions in Germany
- List of diplomatic missions of Germany
- Security issues in Germany
- Visa requirements for German citizens
- Germany-Israel relations
