= Germany–Jamaica relations =

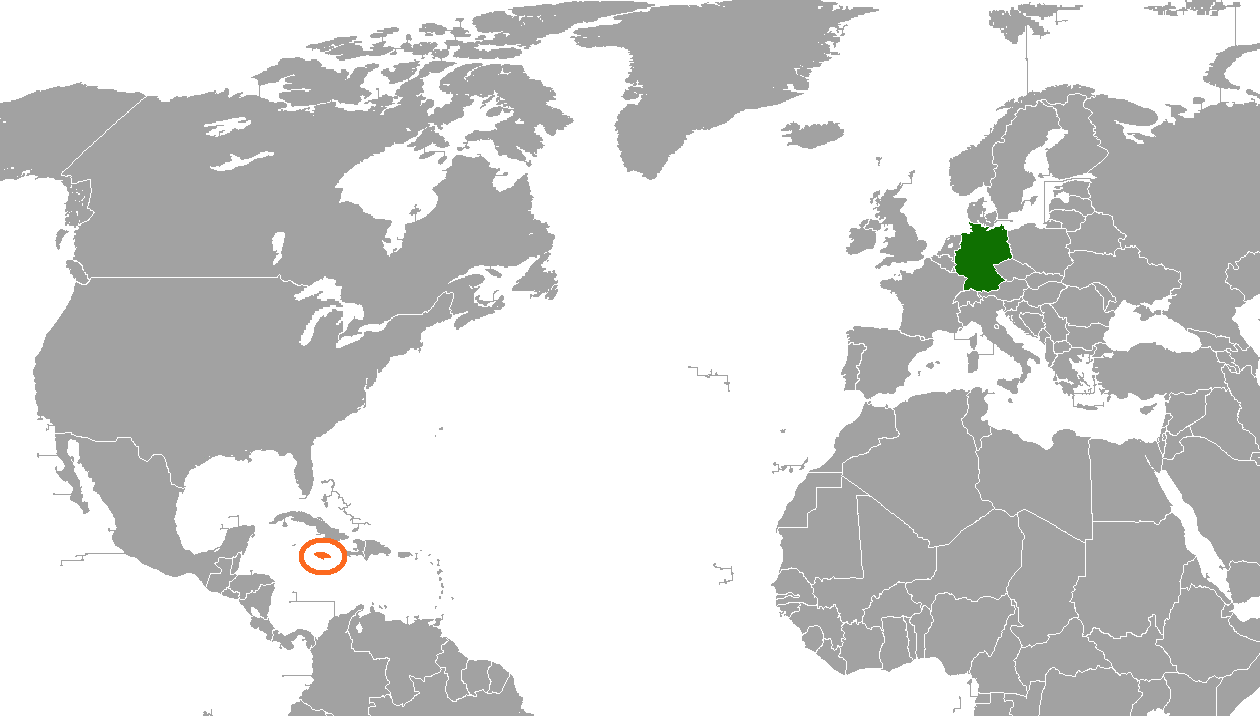

- Germany: Jamaica

Germany–Jamaica relations are the current and historical relations between Germany and Jamaica. Germany has an embassy in Kingston, Jamaica. Jamaica has an embassy in Berlin.

Part of the cooperation takes places through multilateral forums including the Caribbean Community and European Union-Community of Latin American and Caribbean States framework.

== History ==
After the abolition of slavery ordered by the British colonial power, there was a shortage of labor in Jamaica, which is why German workers were recruited. Over a thousand immigrants migrated from Germany to Jamaica and lived in the German settlement founded in 1835 in Seaford Town in Westmoreland.

German-Jamaican relations have been friendly since Jamaica's independence in 1962.

On February 14, 1986, the Agreement on Financial Cooperation between the Government of the Federal Republic of Germany and the Government of Jamaica was concluded in Kingston. After the economic situation in Jamaica had improved, development cooperation, which until then had totaled 255 million euros, was terminated in 2003. Within the framework of EU grants, however, Germany continues to make the highest contributions among the member states of the European Union, with a share of around 20 percent.

== Culture ==
The Jamaican German Society was founded in 1966 and is based in Kingston. The organization receives funding from the German Federal Foreign Office and works together with the German Embassy in the cultural sector. It also offers German courses, the certificates of which are recognized by the Goethe-Institut.

The non-profit Deutsch-Jamaikanische Gesellschaft has existed since 1976 with the aim of deepening relations between Germany and Jamaica.

Jamaican musicians and bands like Boney M became very popular in Germany.

== Trade and tourism ==
Total trade between the two countries stood at around €75 million. Some German companies have invested in hotels and solar power in Jamaica.

In 2022, Germany ranked 5th in the ranking of the largest tourist groups in Jamaica, with around 15,000 visitors.

== People ==
- Dustin Brown - German professional tennis player.
- Daniel Gordon - Football player

== See also ==
- Foreign relations of Germany
- Foreign relations of Jamaica
- Germans in Jamaica
