= National security of Germany =

National security of Germany covers the major threats to Germany's national and international security.

== External threats ==
According to former German Defense Minister Peter Struck, Germany does not face a conventional threat to its territory. In his own words, "At present, and in the foreseeable future, a conventional threat to the German territory is not recognizable."

== Internal threats ==
At the end of 2004, Germany’s Federal Office for the Protection of the Constitution identified 28 Islamist organizations operating in Germany that pose a security risk or promote extremism. Members and followers of these organizations total approximately 32,150 out of a total Muslim population of about 1.5 million. The Turkish organization Islamic Society Millî Görüş has the largest following, numbering 26,500. However, only a small hard core of fanatics is considered to be capable of terrorism. The primary targets are believed to be American, British, Israeli, and Jewish facilities, although the facilities of other nations also are endangered. Potential targets include embassies, consulates, nuclear power plants, dams, airports, sewage plants, subways, skyscrapers, sports stadiums, and churches, according to the former interior minister. The fact that Germany refused to participate in 2003 invasion of Iraq may mitigate the risk of terrorism by extremist Islamic groups somewhat. However, German authorities are not complacent. Germany also faces an internal threat from right-wing and left-wing extremists. At the end of 2004, there were 182 right-wing extremist organizations with 38,600 members, according to the Federal Office for the Protection of the Constitution. Neo-Nazis totaled about 3,800. A hard core of right-wing extremists capable of violence is estimated at about 10,000. Three political parties are associated with right-wing extremism: the Republicans, the German People's Union, and the National Democratic Party of Germany. The far-right German People’s Union holds six seats in the Brandenburg state parliament and one seat in the Bürgerschaft of Bremen. At the end of 2006, the far left, which has revolutionary Marxist and anarchist factions, had about 30,700 adherents. Only about 1,000 out of 65,800 members of the Party of Democratic Socialism support a communist platform. Approximately 6,000 far-left extremists are deemed to be capable of violence.

== Terrorism ==
Following al Qaeda’s September 11, 2001, terrorist attack against the United States, Germans were surprised to learn that the mastermind of the strike and several accomplices previously had been living in Hamburg. Since then, Germany has been a reliable partner in the United States-led war on terrorism, according to the U.S. Department of State. German courts have a high standard of proof, which has made it difficult for authorities to convict or deport terrorist suspects. In February 2003, a Hamburg court convicted Mounir el Motassadeq of aiding and abetting the conspiracy and sentenced him to the maximum available term of 15 years. However, in March 2004, the German supreme court overturned this conviction, which was the first in the world related to the 9/11 incident, for lack of evidence and remanded the case for retrial. Finally, in August 2005, a Hamburg court re-convicted el Motassadeq and sentenced him to a seven-year prison term. In another case, years of procedural maneuvers were required before the German judicial system finally succeeded in October 2004 in deporting an Islamic extremist, the so-called "Caliph of Cologne", to Turkey. In yet another case, in July 2005 a Syrian-German terrorist suspect was released from custody after the German supreme court ruled that he could not be extradited to Spain under a European Union arrest warrant because this step would violate Germany’s Basic Law.

In August 2006, the German government disclosed a botched plot to bomb two German trains. The attack was to occur in July 2006 and involved a 21-year-old Lebanese man, identified only as Youssef Mohammed E. H. Prosecutors said Youssef and another man left suitcases stuffed with crude propane-gas bombs on the trains. The explosives failed to detonate because of a "technical defect," according to the German federal prosecutor. If they had, the police said, a "high number" of passengers would have been killed. Prosecutors said it was likely the would-be bombers were not acting alone and may have been motivated by anger over the war in Lebanon, in which the German government has agreed to play a limited, peacekeeping role. Prosecutors also said Lebanon’s military intelligence agency had offered German authorities "decisive" information that led to Yousef's arrest.

== See also ==
- Foreign relations of Germany
- Law enforcement in Germany
