= Botswana–Germany relations =

Bilateral relations

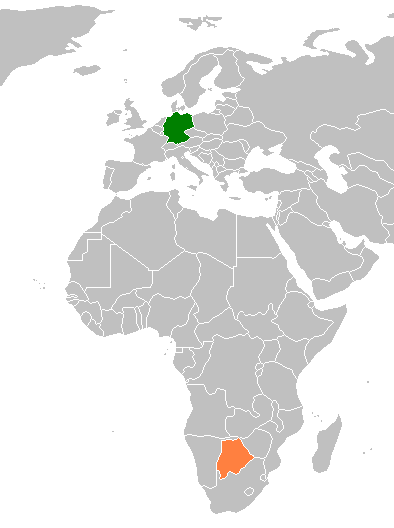

- Germany: Botswana

Botswana–Germany relations refers to the current and historical relationship between Germany and Botswana. Botswana has an embassy in Berlin. Germany has an embassy in Gaborone. In 2017, former president Ian Khama visited Berlin, and in 2018 former Federal Minister for Economic Cooperation and Development Gerd Müller visited Botswana. Relations in March 2023 were considered excellent.

In April 2024, relations became more tense after the president of Botswana, Mokgweetsi Masisi threatened to send 20,000 elephants to Germany after a dispute over hunting trophies.

== See also ==
- Foreign relations of Botswana
- Foreign relations of Germany
