= Bangladesh–Germany relations =

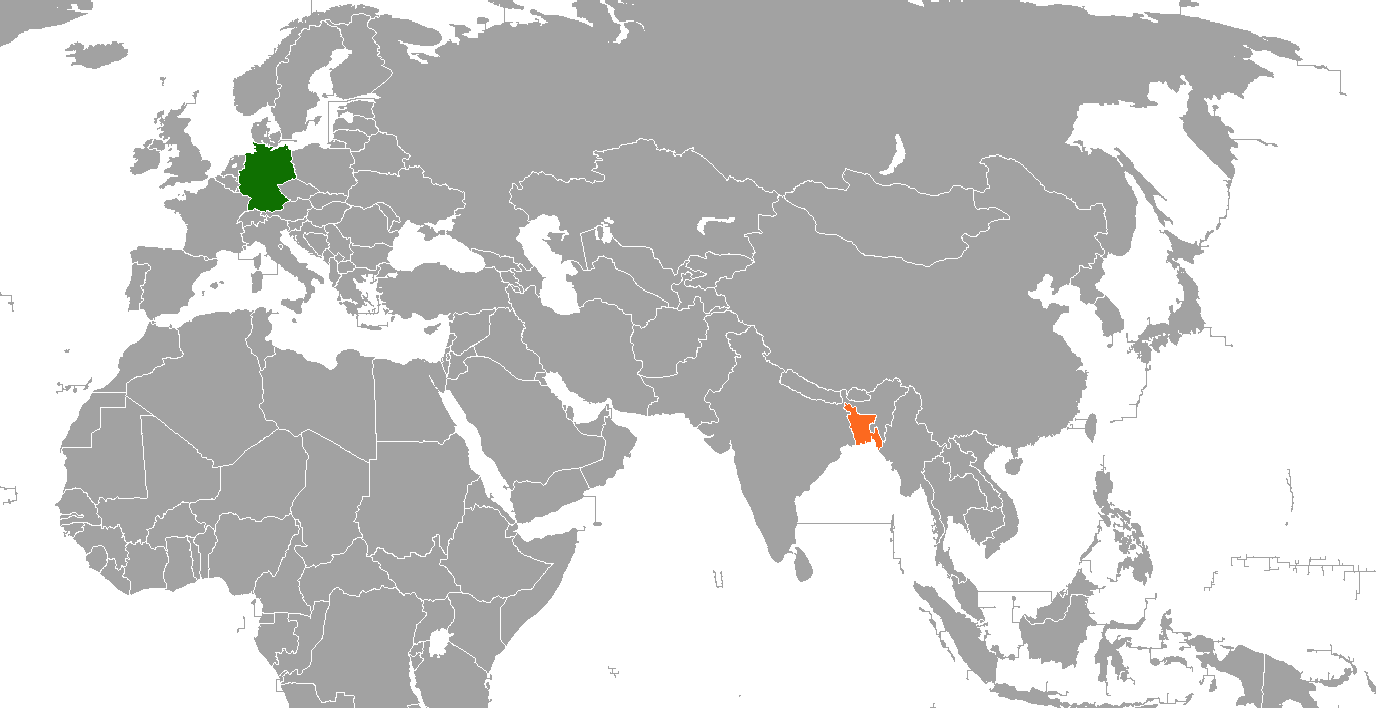

- Germany: Bangladesh

Bangladesh–Germany relations are the bilateral relations between Bangladesh and Germany. Germany has an embassy in Dhaka, and Bangladesh has one in Berlin.

== History ==
After the independence of Bangladesh in 1971, East Germany was the third country in the world, and the first in Europe, to officially recognise Bangladesh in 1972. After establishment of diplomatic relations, the bilateral relations began to grow steadily.

== Cultural ==
The German and Bengali people have a century-old cultural exchange history. German interest in the culture of Bengal dates back to the visits to Germany by the Bengali national poet and Nobel laureate for literature Rabindranath Tagore in the 1920s and 1930s. Many Bangladeshi writers, artists and philosophers take a keen and informed interest in German literature, art, architecture and philosophy. Rapidly increasing contacts amongst German and Bangladeshi artists, primarily in fine arts, photography, film and theatre are well appreciated from both countries. On 6 October 2010 Deutsche Welle (DW), officially launched its programmes in Bengali using the FM frequencies of the state-run radio station Bangladesh Betar.

The cultural cooperation between both countries is mainly channeled through the Goethe Institute that work on developing the cultural ties by sponsoring local and German cultural activities. It is also one of the main meeting place for all those interested in Germany. To exchange experience in primary education section an innovative programme called "Schools: Partners for the Future," was introduced by the Goethe Institute, which allows the primary school teacher training in Germany.

== Economic relations ==
As an economic power as well as an important member of the European Union (EU), Germany is a reliable partner of Bangladesh in development co-operation.

In trade with Germany, Bangladesh has for years recorded a large surplus. Germany is the second largest export market of Bangladesh after the US. Bilateral trade is with about 4.5 billion euros in 2012. A German-Bangladeshi investment promotion and protection agreement has been in force since 1986 and a bilateral double taxation accord since 1993. So far German direct investments in Bangladesh are almost €60 million. The Bangladesh-German Chamber of Commerce and Industry (BGCCI) acts as a business platform and mediator between both the countries.

Exports of cycles by Bangladesh to Germany gained some negative attention after German customs suspected that these cycles were in fact not of Bangladeshi origin, but merely assembled in Bangladesh. Germany has been Bangladesh's largest market for bicycles. Germany has strict policies of knowing the actual country of origin for its imported goods in order to implement duty taxes. As a result of this policy and having strict anti-dumping duty laws and other tariffs, the German import customs demanded an inspection of Bangladeshi factories in order to verify the true origins of these bicycles.

By 2023, total trade had grown to €8.6 billion with €6.9 billion trade balance in Bangladesh's favour.

== Development assistance ==
Germany has been actively involved in supporting sustainable development in Bangladesh through various initiatives. The Deutsche Gesellschaft für Internationale Zusammenarbeit (GIZ) has been working in Bangladesh since 1972, focusing on areas such as sustainable infrastructure, social development, governance, democracy, environment, climate change, economic development, and employment. Since the inception of cooperation in 1972, the total volume of bilateral technical and financial assistance to Bangladesh has reached €3.5 billion

In recent negotiations in 2024, Germany offered Bangladesh €232.5 million in loans and grants, prioritizing renewable energies and climate change adaptation. This assistance aims to support the development of the renewable energy sector, including utility-scale solar parks and possibly battery storage systems in the grid. Furthermore, Germany helping Bangladesh adapt its cities to climate change, achieve sustainable economic development, protect natural resources and improve working conditions for textile workers.

== Bilateral visits ==
On 25 October 2011 the Prime Minister of Bangladesh Sheikh Hasina met German chancellor Angela Merkel in Germany, on a four-day official visit to attend the World Health Summit 2011, along with a meeting on the two nations. The former President of the Federal Republic of Germany, Christian Wulff, visited Bangladesh from 28 November to 30 November 2011 accompanied by Members of the German Parliament, State Secretaries of the German Foreign Office and the German Ministry for Economics and Technology as well as a high-level business delegation.

== German organizations in Bangladesh ==
- German Embassy Dhaka
- Goethe-Institut Dhaka
- German Academic Exchange Service
- Deutsche Gesellschaft für Internationale Zusammenarbeit
- KfW

== Resident diplomatic missions ==
- Bangladesh has an embassy in Berlin.
- Germany has an embassy in Dhaka.
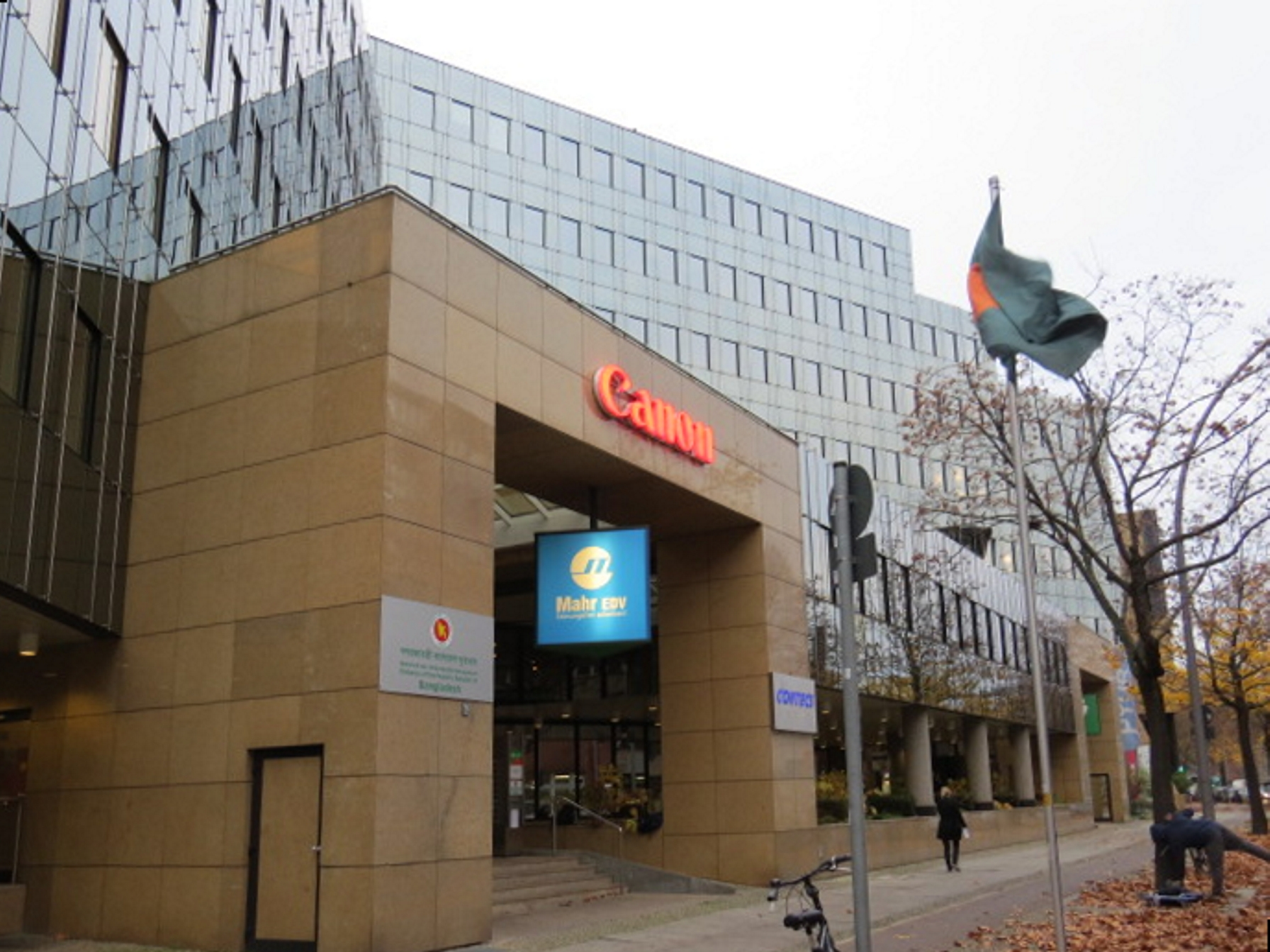
Embassy of Bangladesh in Berlin

== See also ==
- Foreign relations of Bangladesh
- Foreign relations of Germany
