= Germany–Laos relations =

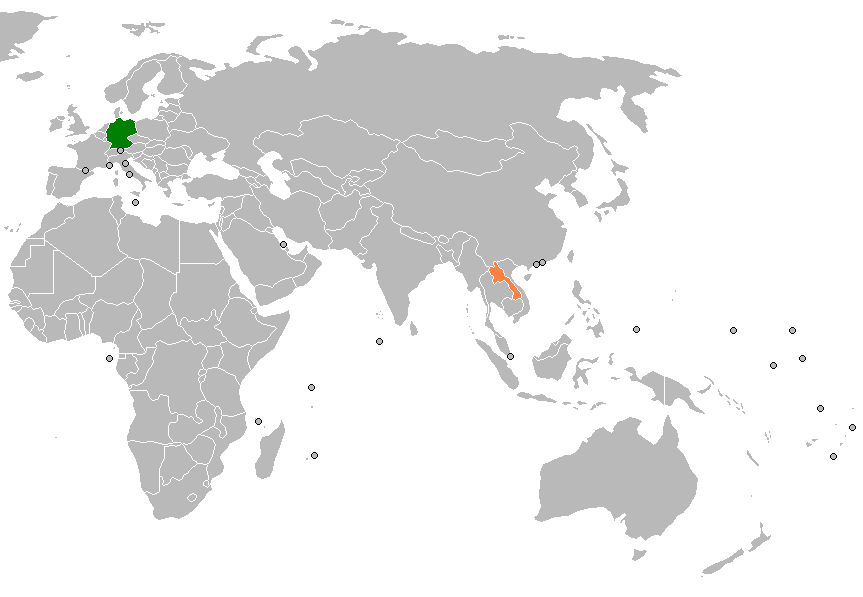

- Germany: Laos

Germany–Laos relations have existed on the bilateral level since the late 1950s.

== History ==
The Federal Republic of Germany established diplomatic relations with Laos on January 31, 1958, and East Germany on May 27, 1974. In 1975, both the Federal Republic and the GDR opened embassies in Vientiane, the capital of Laos. After German reunification, the German-Laotian Society was founded in 1998.

German Chancellor Angela Merkel met with Laos Prime Minister Thongloun Sisolith at the Asia-Europe Meeting summit in Ulaanbaatar on July 14, 2016. The two leaders held another meeting in Berlin on March 13, 2019.

== Economic relations ==
Both countries concluded a bilateral investment agreement in 1999. In 2020, the bilateral trade volume was 154.7 million Euro, making Germany the second-largest trading partner for Laos within the European Union.

Germany has provided development aid to Laos since the 1960s. By 2022, aid payments were over 500 million Euro.

== Cultural relations ==
Almost 3000 Laotians have studied in the former GDR and today the German Academic Exchange Service awards scholarships to Laotian students. In higher education, there are various partnerships between German and Lao institutions. At the National University of Laos, German has been a separate subject since 2003.

Germany has assisted Laos with cultural preservation. In 2015–2018, buildings in the old town of Luang Prabang were restored with funding from the German Foreign Office.

== Diplomatic missions ==
- Germany has an embassy in Vientiane.
- Laos has an embassy in Berlin.
