= List of ambassadors of Paraguay to Germany =

Coordinates: 52.508350°N 13.326837°E

Ambassador of Paraguay to Germany
- Coat of Arms of Paraguay
- Incumbent; Wilma Patricia Frutos Ruiz since November 3, 2021
- Inaugural holder: Alfredo Marbais du Graty
- Formation: 1864

The Paraguayan ambassador in Berlin is the official representative of the Government in Asunción to the Government of Germany.

== List of representatives ==
Diplomatic accreditation	Ambassador	Observations	President of Paraguay	List of Federal Republic of Germany governments	Term end
1864	Alfredo Marbais du Graty	Chargé d'affaires in Prussia	Francisco Solano López	William I, German Emperor	1870
1903	José Irala	Minister Plenipotentiary	Andrés Héctor Carvallo	Wilhelm II, German Emperor	1905
1911	Carlos Goiburú	Minister Plenipotentiary	Liberato Marcial Rojas	Wilhelm II, German Emperor	1912
1927	Eladio Velázquez	Chargé d'affaires	Luis Alberto Riart	Wilhelm Marx	1931
1939	Manlio Schenoni	Chargé d'affaires	José Félix Estigarribia	Adolf Hitler	1942
1952	Víctor Boettner	Minister Plenipotentiary	Raimundo Rolón	Konrad Adenauer	1954
1954	Víctor Boettner		Alfredo Stroessner	Konrad Adenauer	1955
1956	Herminio Morínigo		Alfredo Stroessner	Konrad Adenauer	1958
1958	Ramón Méndez Paiva		Alfredo Stroessner	Konrad Adenauer	1962
1962	Jorge López Moreira		Alfredo Stroessner	Konrad Adenauer	1966
1966	Antonio Salum Flecha		Alfredo Stroessner	Ludwig Erhard	1969
1969	Roque J. Yódice Codas		Alfredo Stroessner	Kurt Georg Kiesinger	1981
1981	Víctor Manuel Godoy Figueredo		Alfredo Stroessner	Helmut Schmidt	1989
1989	Nicolás Luthold		Andrés Rodríguez	Helmut Kohl	1993
1993	Marcos Martínez Mendieta		Juan Carlos Wasmosy	Helmut Kohl	1999
1999	José Martínez Lezcano		Luis Ángel González Macchi	Gerhard Schröder	2003
2004	Lilianne Lebrón de Wenger		Nicanor Duarte Frutos	Gerhard Schröder	2009
2009	Raúl Florentín Ántola		Fernando Armindo Lugo Méndez	Angela Merkel	2014
2014	Gustavo Ariel Libardi Vera	Chargé d'affaires	Horacio Cartes	Angela Merkel	May 2, 2016
May 2, 2016	Roberto Carlos Maidana Barrios	Chargé d'affaires	Horacio Cartes	Angela Merkel	
November 3, 2021	Wilma Patricia Frutos Ruiz	Ambassadrice	Mario Abdo Benítez	Angela Merkel	
