= Germany–Nepal relations =

- Germany: Nepal

Germany–Nepal relations are the bilateral relations between the Federal Republic of Germany and Federal Democratic Republic of Nepal.

In World War II, Nepal was one of the first countries to declare war on Germany, on 4 September 1939, the fourth day of the German invasion of Poland.

Germany–Nepal relations were officially established on 4 April 1958.

== Trade ==
Diversification and expansion of trade was felt a necessity in Nepal only during the late 1950s even though the country has sophisticated trading history with Tibet and British-India. In 2022, Nepal exported $43 million worth of goods to Germany, with the largest export being carpets. Germany exported $47.3 million worth of goods to Nepal that same year, with the largest export being razor blades.

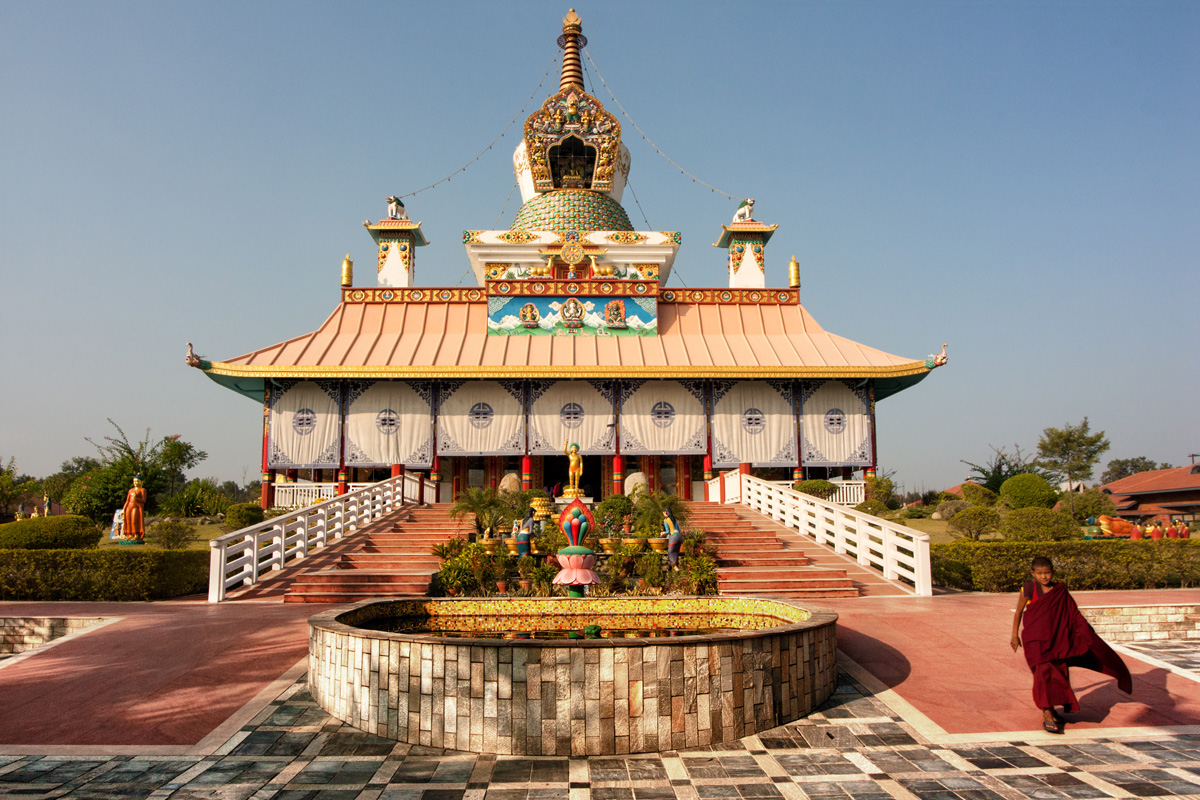
Buddhist Temple of Germany in Lumbini, Nepal
