= Germany–Libya relations =

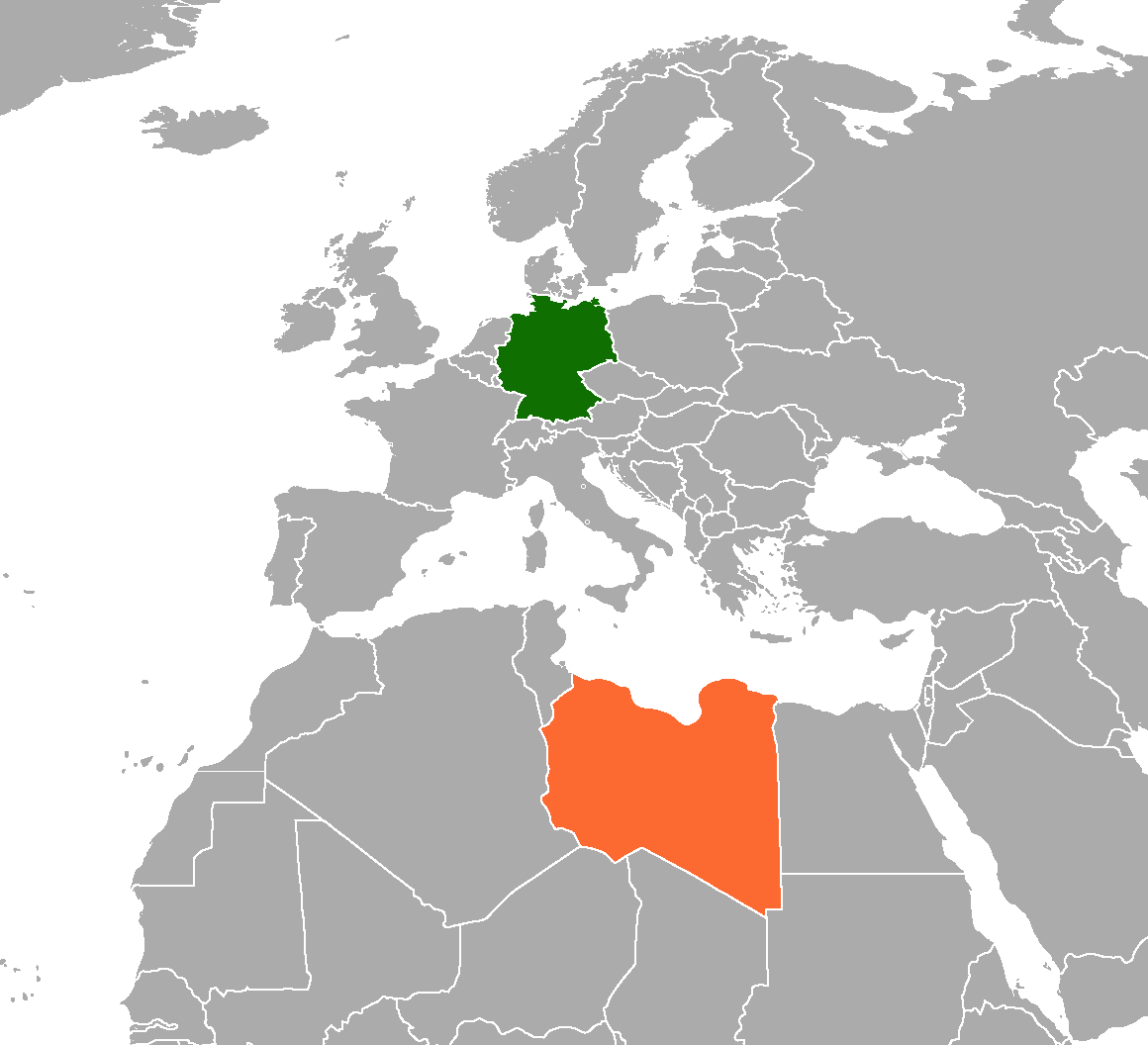

- Germany: Libya

Germany–Libya relations are bilateral relations between the Central European state of Germany and the North African state of Libya. Germany is represented in Libya with an embassy in Tripoli (currently closed) and a diplomatic office in Benghazi, while Libya has an embassy in Berlin (currently closed). The relationship between these countries was tense in the late 1980s following a bombing incident, but improved since with increasingly close co-operation especially on economic matters. However, during the 2011 Libyan civil war, Germany sided politically with the National Transitional Council, which it recognized as Libya's legitimate government after severing ties with Muammar Gaddafi's regime.

== History ==
German involvement in Libya dates back to at least the Western Desert Campaign, when Libya was a colony of the Kingdom of Italy.

Libya was later blamed for the 1986 Berlin discotheque bombing after telex messages had been intercepted from Libya to the Libyan East Berlin embassy congratulating them on a job well done.

In 1997, Germany was Libya's second "most important trading partner." As David E. Long and Bernard Reich write, "Libya's relations with Western Europe--especially those with Germany...with which Libya has extensive business dealings--have been better than its relations with the United States....Libya also exports its light, sweet crude to Western Europe, primarily to Germany..."

In 2004, a delegation led by Germany's deputy foreign minister visited Libya. During the visit they met the Libyan President to discuss bilateral ties and mutual collaboration. Another issue discussed was landmines planted by the German Army during World War II. Xinhua reported that this meeting also resulted in "the inking of big deals in the energy sector, ushering in a brand-new relationship between Libya and Germany."

In 2020, Chancellor Angela Merkel announced that Germany would host peace talks between Libya's fighting parties.
