= Germany–Kenya relations =

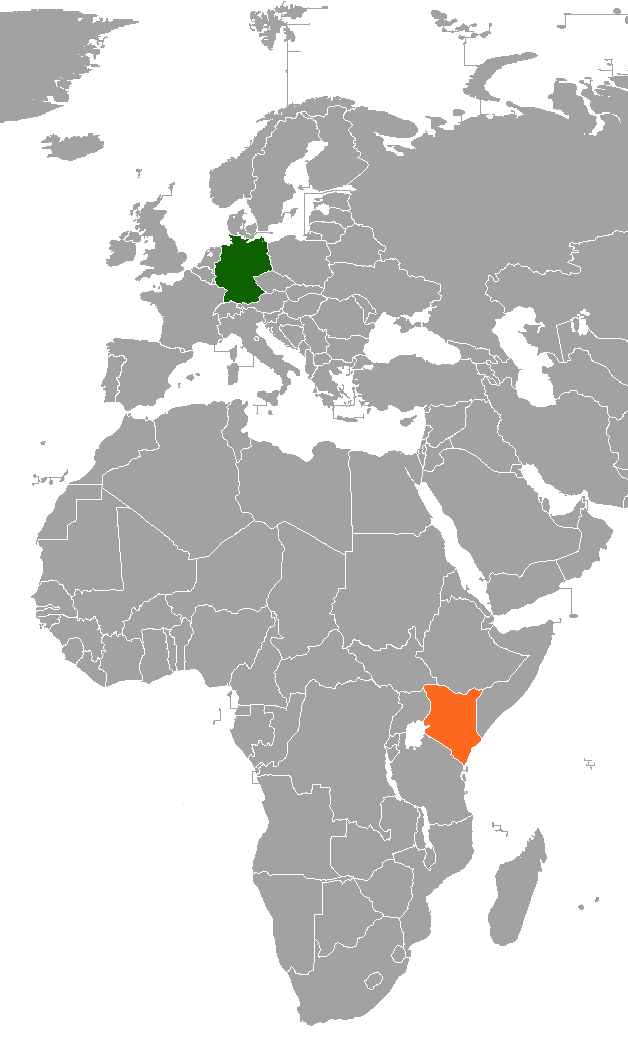

- Germany: Kenya

Germany–Kenya relations are bilateral relations between Germany and Kenya.

== History ==
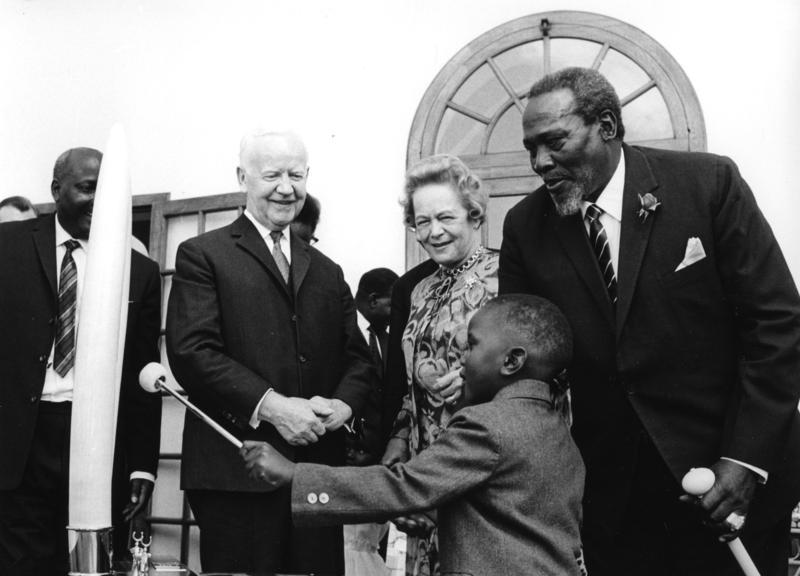
The young Uhuru (President 2013–2022, Kenya) with his father Kenyatta (First President of Kenya) and the West German President Heinrich Lübke.

Germany was the first country to recognise Kenya on independence. Both countries enjoy warm relations.

=== High-level Visits ===
In February 2020, President Frank-Walter Steinmeier visited Nairobi and held talks with President Uhuru Kenyatta. The visit centered on increasing cooperation in education and technology transfer. In June of 2023 the German chancellor visited Kenya on a 2 day visit.

=== German ambassador to Kenya ===
The current German ambassador to Kenya is named Sebastian Groth. He has been in this position since june 2022. He was also in office during the visit of Olaf Scholz. He speaks German, French, English and Kiswahili. He has amassed a decent following on X.

In July 2011, German Chancellor Angela Merkel visited Kenya. She held talks with President Mwai Kibaki and Prime Minister Raila Odinga. The Chancellor was on a tour to begin the newly incepted 'Afrika-Konzept'.

In 1966, President Heinrich Lübke of West Germany visited Nairobi.

In 2014, the former Foreign Cabinet Secretary of Kenya, Amina Mohamed met with then Foreign Affairs Minister Frank-Walter Steinmeier in Berlin.

In the same year, Former President of Germany, Horst Köhler led a trade delegation to Nairobi. He also held talks with President Uhuru Kenyatta.

Germany is usually the third or fourth largest source of tourists to Kenya. Germany unlike other European countries restrained itself from issuing travel advisories to Kenya.

== Development cooperation ==
German development cooperation from 2014 to 2016 is said to be worth KES. 14.6 billion (EUR. 138 million).

Key areas for Kenya and Germany are:

- Agriculture (focusing on food security and drought resilience)
- Development of the water and sanitation sector
- Support for the health sector
- Good governance (tackling corruption and improving transparency and accountability)
- Renewable energy and energy efficiency
- Education

Official Development Assistance (ODA) for Kenya amounts up to KES. 24.08 billion (EUR. 227 million) annually (2011/2012). Germany is Kenya's second largest financial donor. Numerous German political foundations also have a Kenyan office.

== Trade ==
Germany is Kenya's third largest export market in Europe after the UK and the Netherlands.

In 2019, Kenya exported goods worth KES. 11.28 bn (EUR. 100 million). Germany exported goods worth KES. 44.4 bn (EUR. 400 million).

In 2013, Kenya exported goods worth KES. 8.24 billion (EUR. 78 million) to Germany. Germany exported goods worth KES. 37.49 billion (EUR. 354 million) to Kenya.

Kenya and Germany signed an agreement to avoid double taxation in 1977.

=== FDI ===
Companies such as BASF and Lufthansa Cargo have operations in Kenya. Over 60 German companies have invested more than KES. 9 billion (EUR. 86 million) in Kenya.

== Migration ==
A deal signed by both countries in September 2024 opened German labour market for up to a quarter of a million skilled and semi skilled workers from Kenya. It also included an agreement on readmission and return of unwanted individuals. The deal was made at a time when the anti-immigration AfD party was growing in popularity in Germany. On the side of Kenya the deal is struck next month after its young population's massive riots limited the government's ability to impose tax increases. There are concerns about brain drain in Kenya, as professionals such as doctors and nurses could leave for better-paying jobs in Germany.

== Diplomatic missions ==
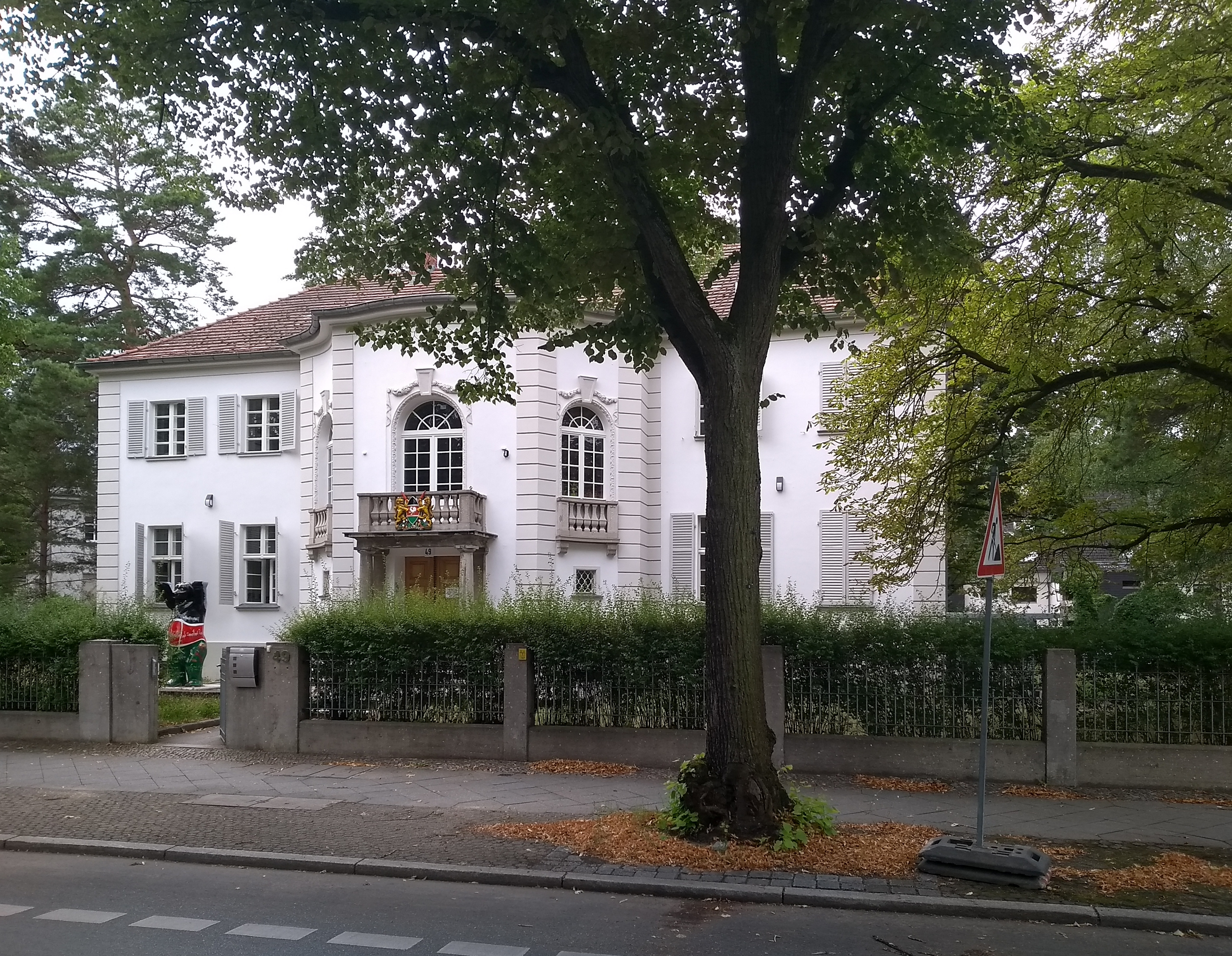
Embassy of Kenya in Berlin

- Germany has an embassy in Nairobi.
- Kenya has an embassy in Berlin.
