= Germany–Malawi relations =

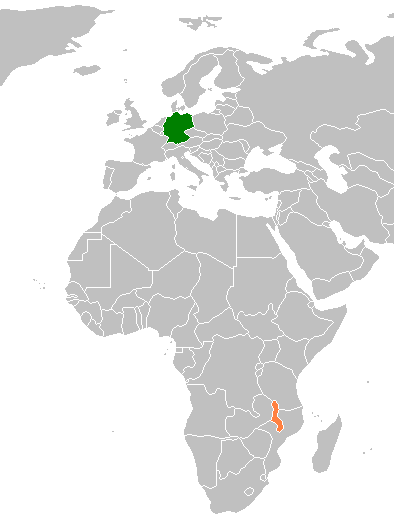

- Germany: Malawi

Germany–Malawi relations are the bilateral relations between Germany and Malawi. Both countries established diplomatic relations in 1964. One focus of today's bilateral cooperation is development cooperation, with Germany being one of the most important donor countries for Malawi.

== History ==
The first contacts between the two societies were established in the late 19th century, when German missionaries such as Alexander Merensky traveled around the Lake Malawi region. Malawi and West Germany established diplomatic relations in 1964, with Johannes Balser being appointed as the first West German ambassador to Malawi. In 1986, a Malawian embassy was opened in Bonn, which was relocated to Berlin-Charlottenburg in 2001 after German reunification. In the same year, both countries also concluded an agreement on financial cooperation.

The private German-Malawian Society for the Promotion of Mutual Relations was founded in Berlin in 2009.

In August 2024, the President of Malawi, Lazarus Chakwera, visited Germany, the first state visit by a Malawian president since 2010.

== Economic relations ==
Mutual trade in goods is not very intensive. In 2024, German exports of goods to Malawi amounted to 31.9 million euros, while imports from the country amounted to 90.2 million euros. This puts Malawi in 140th place in the ranking of Germany's trading partners. Germany mainly exports industrial products to Malawi and mainly imports sugar and raw tobacco in return.

== Development cooperation ==
From 1964 to 2017, Germany provided development aid to Malawi amounting to 1.5 billion euros. In 2017, a further 82 million euros were pledged, in addition to 31 million euros in funding under the special initiative “One World – No Hunger”. After negotiations, a further 70 million euros were pledged in December 2023 for the next two years, to which 12 million for the special agricultural initiative will be added. The priority areas of development cooperation include health, adaptation to climate change, social security and private sector development in rural areas. Germany is also promoting the development of Malawi's education system by training teaching staff, building school buildings and providing assistance with school meals.

The Deutsche Gesellschaft für Internationale Zusammenarbeit (GIZ) has had an office in Malawi since 1998 and employs almost 200 people locally.

== Cultural relations ==
The German Embassy in Lilongwe promotes joint cultural relations by funding cultural projects, awarding scholarships and promoting sports. There is one school in Malawi where German is taught.

There is a very close scientific exchange between Malawi and Germany in the field of primate archaeology. In 1991, German paleoanthropologist and his helpers found the lower jaw of UR 501, a 2.4-million-year-old hominid that belonged to Homo rudolfensis, in Malawi, in a small village near Karonga called Uraha. The construction of the Cultural & Museum Centre Karonga was largely supported by German scientists and co-financed by Germany. The Malawi-German non-governmental organization Uraha Foundation is responsible for the project. The museum's partner organizations include the Johann Wolfgang Goethe University Frankfurt, the Senckenberg Research Institute and the Hessisches Landesmuseum Darmstadt.

Since 1968, the Malawian capital Lilongwe and the capital of Lower Saxony, Hannover, have been twinned cities.
