= El Salvador–Germany relations =

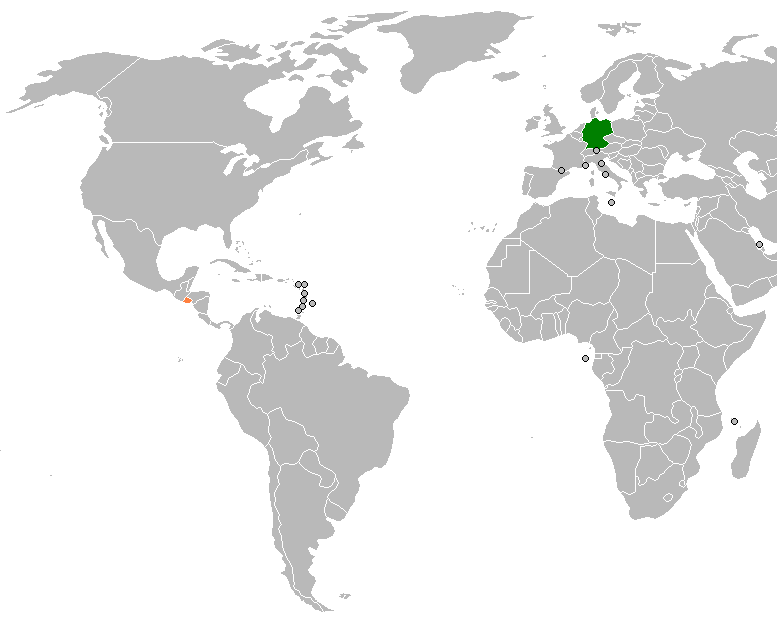

- Germany: El Salvador

El Salvador–Germany relations are relations between Germany and El Salvador.

== History ==
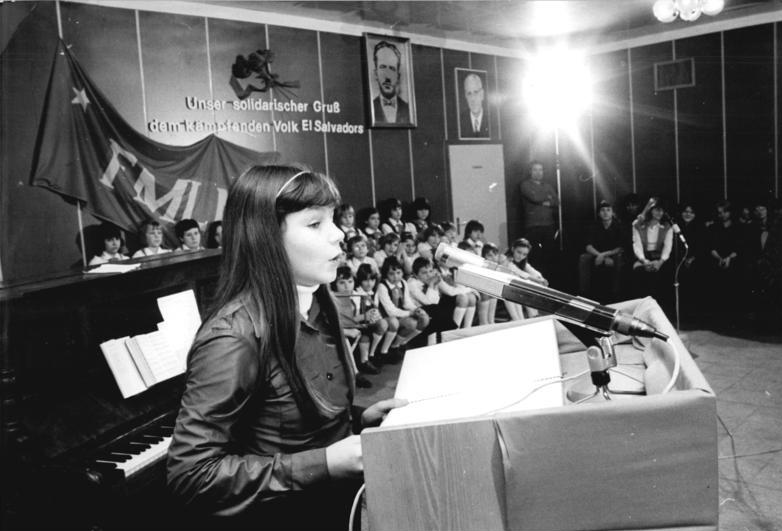
Solidarity event in the GDR for the “just liberation struggle of the Salvadoran patriots” (1982)

In 1851, Franz Hugo Hesse became the Prussian ambassador to Central America, and in 1853 he appointed his own consular agent for El Salvador and concluded a trade agreement with the country. In the period that followed, Germany became an important trading partner for the Central American states, although German investment was more concentrated in Costa Rica and Guatemala, where some German immigrants also settled. Occasionally, Germans also came to El Salvador. The name of the Salvadoran municipality Berlín is said to come from Serafín Brennen, a German who, after a ship accident, is said to have been stranded on the Salvadoran coast. He settled in the village of Agua Caliente, which is now called Berlín, and convinced the inhabitants to rename the village after the German capital. For this reason, the municipality's current flag is an almost identical copy of the German flag.

The events of the two world wars destroyed Germany's influence in the region. During World War II, El Salvador declared war on Nazi Germany in December 1941. Relations were finally resumed in 1951, when Eugen Klee became the envoy of the Federal Republic of Germany in El Salvador. In the 1960s, Germany began providing development aid in the country and in 1965 a German school was opened in the country.

In 1979, José Napoleón Duarte came to power in El Salvador and a brutal civil war broke out between the government and the FMLN. East Germany supported the FMLN, as did left-wing groups in West Germany, which formed solidarity committees. The German left-wing newspaper Die Tageszeitung even launched a fundraising campaign called “Arms for El Salvador” and collected 4.7 million German Marks in private donations to arm the FMLN guerrillas, handing the funds over to the group in 1992, shortly before a ceasefire was signed. In 1982, members of the conservative CDU party in the Bundestag questioned the legality of the Tageszeitung's actions.

After the German reunification, both sides signed a financial cooperation agreement in 1993. In 2000, El Salvador moved its embassy from Bonn to Berlin.

== Economic relations ==
In 2024, German exports of goods to El Salvador amounted to 155 million euros and imports from the country to 79 million euros. This put El Salvador in 123rd place in the ranking of Germany's trading partners. Germany is one of the most important importers of Salvadoran coffee. A German Chamber of Industry and Commerce in San Salvador promotes mutual trade relations.

Germany provided development assistance to El Salvador for over 50 years. In recent times, project funding has been provided primarily through the Central American Integration System.

== Cultural relations ==
The German-Salvadoran Cultural Forum is entrusted with promoting mutual cultural relations. There is a German school in El Salvador. In addition, several political foundations, church institutions and non-governmental organizations from Germany are active in the country.

== Diplomatic relations ==
- Germany has an embassy in San Salvador.
- El Salvador has an embassy in Berlin.
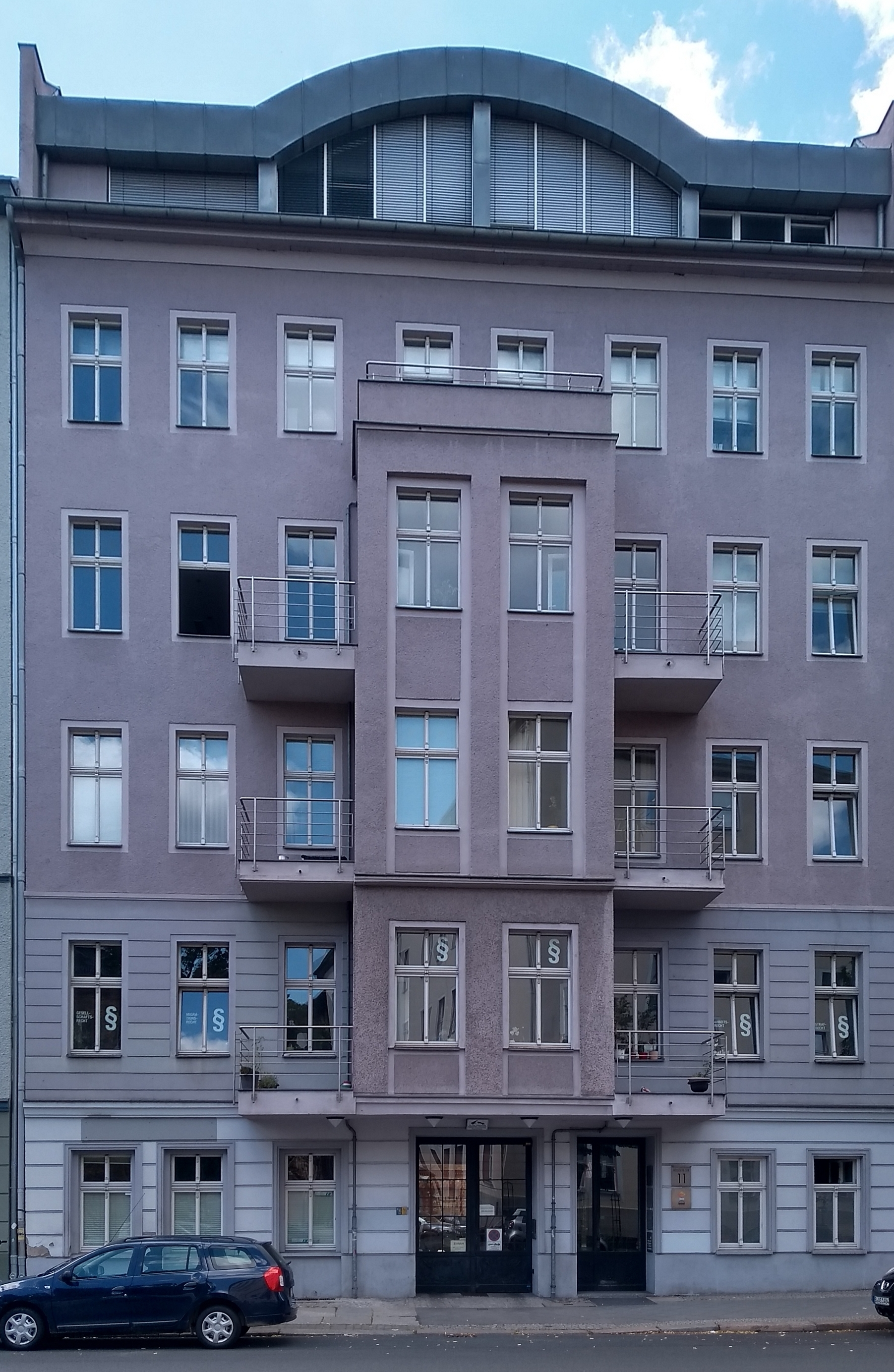
Embassy of El Salvador in Berlin
