= Belize–Germany relations =

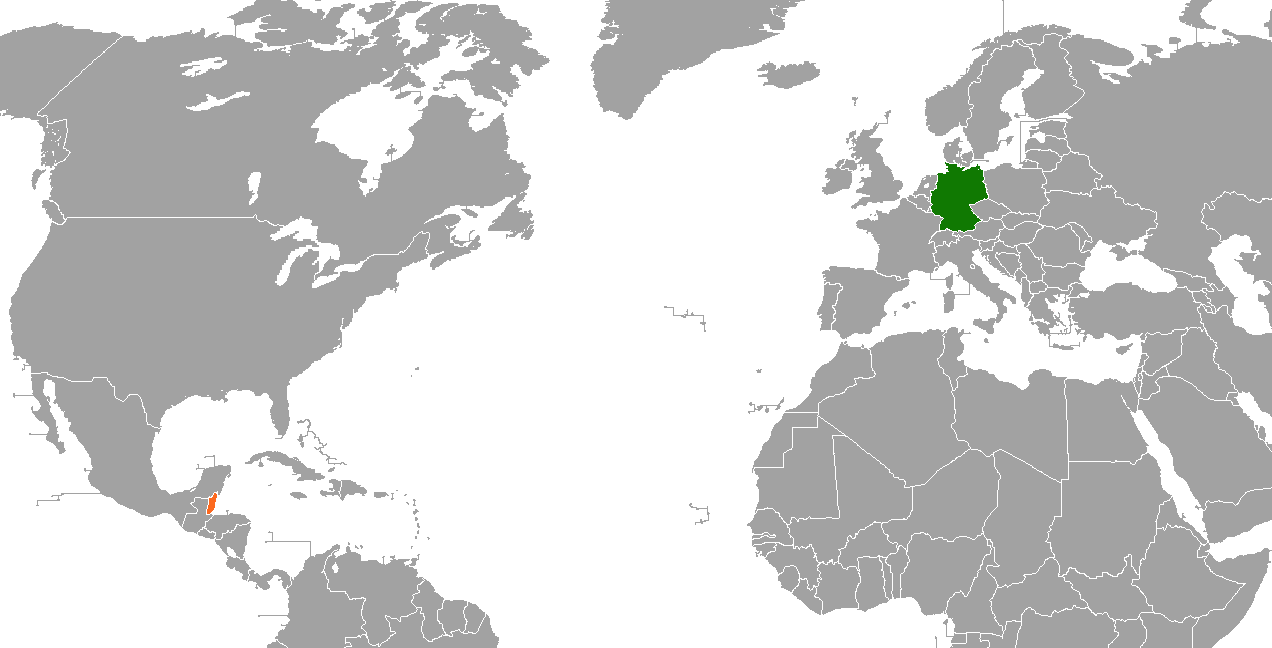

- Germany: Belize

Map of Mennonite Colonies in Belize

Belize–Germany relations are bilateral relations between Belize and Germany. The Federal Foreign Office describes the relations between the two countries as "friendly and unproblematic". Germany does not have an embassy in Belize. Instead, the German Embassy in Guatemala City is responsible for maintaining relations with Belize. Germany also has an honorary consul in Belize City. The Belizean Embassy in Brussels is responsible for relations with Germany.

There are some old cultural contacts between Belize and Germany. For example, the Moravian Church was active in Belize from the mid-19th century. In 1901, the future writer, cabaret artist and painter Joachim Ringelnatz spent some time in British Honduras. On September 21, 1981, the Federal Republic of Germany was the second country after the United Kingdom to recognize Belize as an independent state under international law. The establishment of diplomatic relations with the FRG began in March 1982. Diplomatic relations with the GDR never existed. Since then, Germany and Belize have developed friendly but low-intensity relations. At the level of the United Nations (UN), Belize has often supported German initiatives.

Trade relations are underdeveloped and appear insignificant in the German trade balance. In 2024, German goods exports to Belize amounted to 7 million euros and imports from the country amounted to 6.3 million euros. Belize thus ranked 182nd in the list of Germany's trading partners. Germany has provided development assistance to Belize. The focus was particularly on environmental protection, such as the protection of the coast and marine resources and the tropical rainforest.

In Belize, Russian-German Mennonites began to settle from the late 1950s, coming from Canada and Mexico. In 1969, they founded their own "Mennonite Center" in Belize City. Most of the Mennonites in Belize speak Plautdietsch, a Low German dialect. There are also several hundred Pennsylvania Dutch-speaking Old Order Mennonites in the country. These groups live in separate communities and, due to their high birth rate, are among the fastest growing ethnic groups in multicultural Belize. By 2022, the Mennonite community had grown from a few thousand to almost 15,500 people, almost four percent of the population. The Mennonites take little part in the political life of the country, but are very successful in agriculture, crafts and small-scale industry.
