= Germany–Sri Lanka relations =

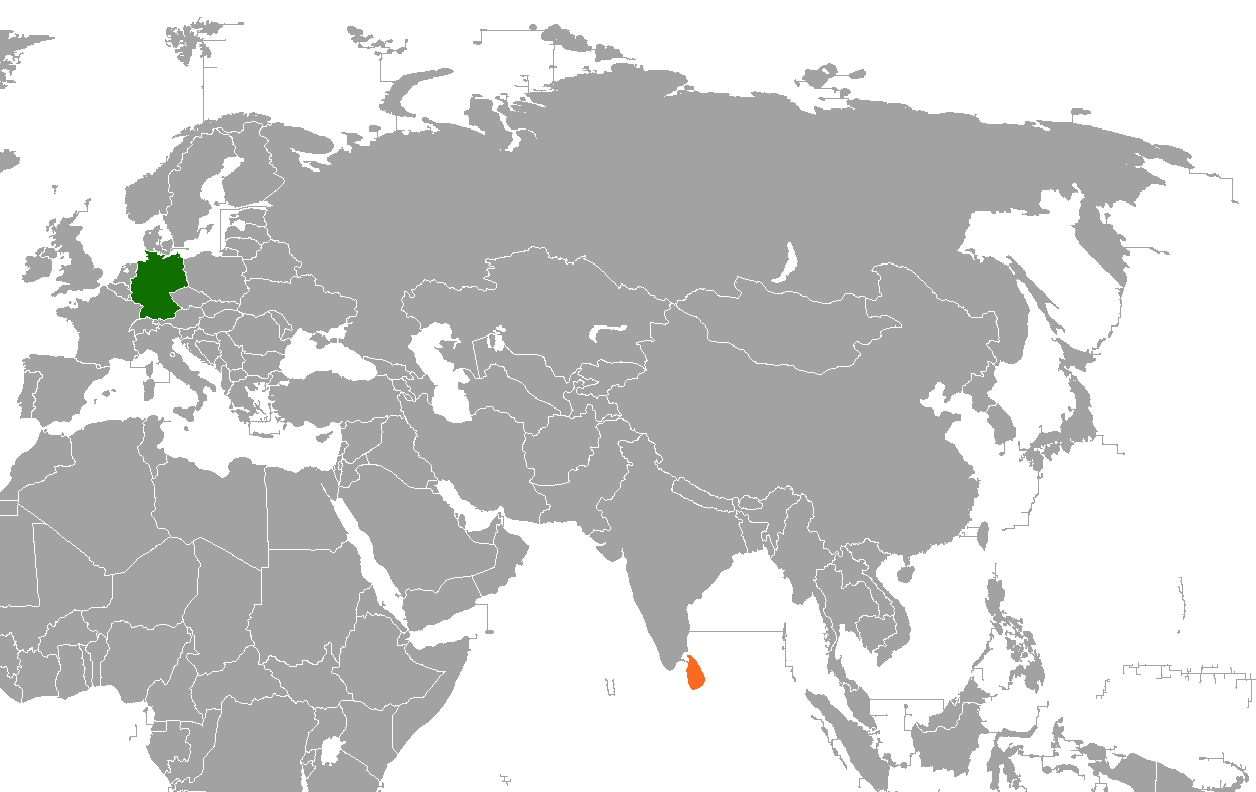

- Germany: Sri Lanka

Germany–Sri Lanka relations are diplomatic relations between Germany and Sri Lanka. They have existed since 1953, and the 60th anniversary was celebrated in Berlin in October 2013. With the end of the 30-year civil war in 2009, Germany became an important partner in reconstruction as well as a helper in the reconciliation of the different ethnic groups.

== Economic exchange ==
Germany is the fourth most important export market for Sri Lanka. In 2021, the value of German imported goods from Sri Lanka, which mainly consist of rubber, tea and textiles, was 864.5 million euros. German exports of machinery, electrical and chemical products, and motor vehicles, amounted to 265.6 million euros. Germany is Sri Lanka's second most important investor from the EU. Investments by 51 German companies have created approximately 11,700 local jobs in Sri Lanka since 1951. In the 1950s, various trade agreements were concluded, which serve as a basis for bilateral cooperation. In 1979, a double taxation agreement was signed, which offers reduced tax rates on dividends and interest for both countries.

=== Tourism ===
German visitors represented the third most important tourist group for Sri Lanka with 85,470 travelers in 2013. The tourism low caused by the 2004 tsunami and the civil war that lasted until 2009 was overcome in subsequent years by steadily increasing visitor numbers. In 2014, for example, Sri Lanka saw a tourism growth of German travelers of about 21% (2013: 85,000; 2014: 103,000).

=== Agreements ===
- Trade agreements (1950, 1955, 1958)
- Framework Agreement on Technical Cooperation (1973)
- Air transport agreements (1973, 1995)
- Double taxation treaty (1979)
- Investment Promotion and Protection Agreement (2000)

== Education ==
- In 1999, the South Asia Institute Heidelberg (SAI) opened a branch office in Colombo. In 2014, the SAI and the University of Colombo were able to deepen their relationship through a Memorandum of Understanding.
- The Goethe-Institut has had a branch in Colombo since 1957. The institute's involvement focuses primarily on the areas of cultural exchange and offering language training opportunities.
- The German Academic Exchange Service (DAAD) established a branch in India in 1960 and offers scholarships and exchange programs there for students from Sri Lanka and Germany, among other things.

== Development cooperation ==
Germany has been involved in development policy in Sri Lanka since 1958 within the framework of regional programs. In view of the still ongoing reconciliation and peace processes, the focus of cooperation is primarily on crisis prevention and peace development. To this end, programs for social integration and transformation as well as peace education have been established. Other measures include vocational training projects in the north and east of the country.

== Diplomatic locations ==
- Germany has an embassy in Colombo.
- Sri Lanka has an embassy in Berlin.

== See also ==
- Sri Lankan sporting disappearances
