= Germany–Tonga relations =

- Germany: Tonga

Foreign relations between Germany and Tonga began on 1 May 1976.

The German embassy in Wellington is also responsible for Tonga. A German honorary consulate is active in Nukuʻalofa. Tonga's embassy in the United Kingdom is also responsible for Germany. There are also honorary consulates in Düsseldorf and Hamburg.

== History ==
In the 19th century, German settlers migrated to Tonga. They were relatively few in number, and were distinct from other German settler communities in the New World in their proportionally high, fast and near complete assimilation into the local culture.

In 1876, Germany signed a treaty of friendship with Tonga, and leased space for a coaling station at Neiafu in Vavaʻu. The political background of the Treaty of Friendship of 1876 was the heyday of imperialism and colonialism in the Pacific Islands. During this phase, various great powers (including the German Empire) fought over the division of the region. In 1878 Emperor Wilhelm I sent King George Tupou I a life-sized portrait of himself. This was followed in 1879 by awarding him the Order of the Red Eagle. In the Samoa Treaty of 1899, Germany recognised the Tonga Islands as part of Britain's sphere of interests. In 1900, Tonga became a British protectorate, and Germany's rights were ceded to Britain. During World War I, New Zealand recruited Tongans to fight Germany in the New Zealand Expeditionary Force.

Germany showed a renewed interest in Tonga in 1976, when the Soviet Union proposed establishing a base there, and re-establishing diplomatic relations, renewing the Treaty of Friendship, and granting bilateral aid for the first time.

== High level visits ==
King Tāufaʻāhau Tupou IV visited West Germany in 1980.

In 2016, the President of the Bundestag Norbert Lammert visited the island to mark 140 years of relations between the two countries. In February 2026, German Foreign Minister Johann Wadephul visited Tonga, along with Australia, Brunei, New Zealand and Singapore, as part of a diplomatic tour of the Western Pacific area.

== General bibliography ==
- Cook, Kasia (2015). "German-Tongan diaspora : the movement of German-Tongans to Europe from 1920" (PDF). New Zealand Journal of Research on Europe. 9 (1): 100–133.
- James N. Bade (2014). Germans in Tonga. Edited Collection. doi:10.3726/978-3-653-04220-7. ISBN 9783631646878.
