= The Gambia–Germany relations =

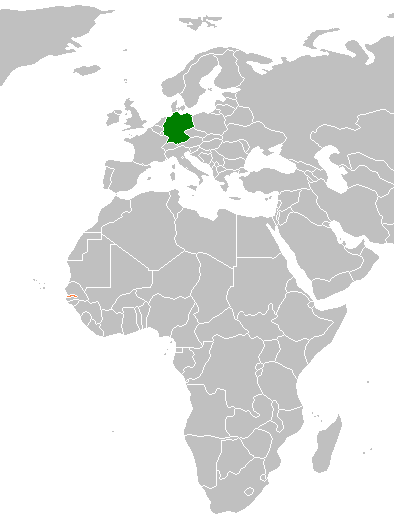

- Germany: Gambia

Gambia–Germany relations are the bilateral relations between Germany and The Gambia. The Gambia has maintained diplomatic relations with the Federal Republic of Germany since 1965. After the fall of the autocratic ruler Yahya Jammeh and the return to democracy in The Gambia, relations have intensified again, which was also expressed by the establishment of a German embassy in Banjul on May 17, 2023.

== History ==
In 1651, the German-speaking Jakob Kettler, Duke of Courland and Semigallia, founded a colony in present-day Gambia. He had sent two ships to Africa, whose captain acquired the island of Kunta Kinteh from the king of Nuimi on October 26, 1651. In addition, the island of Banjol was leased and Fort Jillifree was built near Jufureh. The colony was intended to strengthen trade with Courland. However, after Kettler was taken prisoner by the Swedes during the Second Northern War, the Courland colony had to be abandoned again in 1658. The Gambia finally came under British control in the 18th century, which is why there was little contact with Germany during the colonial period.

The Gambia established diplomatic relations with the West Germany in 1965, after gaining independence. From 1973, with the end of the Hallstein Doctrine, the Gambia also started official diplomatic relations with the German Democratic Republic. Germany provided development aid to The Gambia and the relations were friendly, but cooled significantly during the reign of President Yahya Jammeh between 1992 and 2016. After his overthrow, relations improved again. In December 2017, German President Frank-Walter Steinmeier visited Gambia as the first German and European head of state and pledged support for the country's return to democracy.

== Economic relations ==
Two-way trade in goods remains low. In 2024, German exports of goods to The Gambia were valued at 20.6 million euros, while imports from The Gambia were valued at 0.5 million euros. This places The Gambia in 177th place among Germany's trading partners. However, remittances from Gambian migrants in Germany and tourism revenue from Germany, which are important sources of income for The Gambia, are economically significant.

== Migration ==
After 2012, there was an increase in the influx of Gambians to Germany. With 15,500 Gambians in Germany as of 2021, they are now one of the largest African migrant groups in the country. Nearly half of them were obligated to leave. Among the Gambian asylum seekers who was deported from Germany was the future president, Adama Barrow, who unsuccessfully applied for asylum in Karlsruhe in 1988.

== German Gambians ==
- Amando Aust
- Sira-Anna Faal
- Bakery Jatta
