= AHK =

AHK may refer to:

- AutoHotkey, a programming language
- Air Hong Kong, ICAO airline designator
- Akha language of China and Myanmar, ISO 639-3 code
- Allied High Commission (German Alliierte Hohe Kommission), for post-WWII Germany
- Auslandshandelskammer, German chambers of commerce abroad
  - AHK USA
- Austro-Hungarian krone
