= German-Thai Chamber of Commerce =

AHK Thailand or the German-Thai Chamber of Commerce (GTCC) is a non-profit entity which promotes bilateral economic relations between Germany and Thailand. It is a member of the German Chambers of Commerce Worldwide Network (AHKs), with 150 locations in 93 countries around the world.

Information file GTCC

== History ==
In 1959 German businesses in Thailand founded a "German Business Group" and soon led to the creation of bilateral Chamber of Commerce.

The German-Thai Chamber of Commerce (GTCC) was officially founded by 57 German and Thai business representatives on 19 July 1962. The inauguration ceremony took place at the Erawan Hotel, Bangkok. By 1965, the GTCC had grown to 100 member companies, and to around 300 during the following 20 years. Since 2017, its membership of approximately 600 has made it one of the largest foreign chambers of commerce in Thailand.

== Board of directors and management ==
The Board of Directors includes key figures in the German-Thai business community. Ensuring that the services offered by the Chamber are efficient, comprehensive and up-to-date, the board sets the broad lines of Chamber policy. The current president of the German-Thai Chamber of Commerce is Oliver Schnatz, Cluster General Manager of the Sofitel Bangkok Sukhumvit. Since August 2026, the Chamber has been managed by the Executive Director, Matthias Hoffmann, and Deputy Executive Director, Marius Mehner.

== Organization ==
The GTCC is structured into five main departments, which are Administration; Corporate Services; German-Thai Dual Excellence Education (GTDEE); Finance; and Membership, Events & Communications.

== Services ==
Address research, individual business partner matching, market information, as well as market entry advisory in Thailand, Germany and the ASEAN countries are just some of the GTCC's services. Further services include translations in Thai, German, and English; debt collection and dispute resolution. Additionally, each GTCC department offers further specialized services. While the Corporate Communication department, for example, organizes events, seminars as well as workshops, and publishes a broad range of publications, the Trade Fair department is in charge of exhibition projects and visits to trade fairs in Germany and Thailand.

== Membership ==
Member companies are diverse, covering a broad range of industries. GTCC's members are small and medium-sized companies as well as large enterprises. Manufacturers, service providers, financial institutions, trade organizations, and public bodies and educational institutions are among the GTCC's members. With nearly 600 members, the GTCC is one of the largest bilateral Chambers of Commerce in Thailand. A membership with the German-Thai Chamber of Commerce offers a variety of benefits, which allow participating companies to emerge with prestige and a good reputation in the German-Thai business community.

== Partners ==
The German-Thai Chamber of Commerce is co-operating with the German Chambers of Industry and Commerce (IHK) as well as with the Association of German Chambers of Industry and Commerce (DIHK). Other partners include the Federal Ministry for Economic Affairs and Energy (BMWE), the German International Cooperation / Deutsche Gesellschaft für Internationale Zusammenarbeit (GIZ), The German Business Portal iXPOS, as well as Germany Trade and Invest (GTAI).

== Publications ==
The Chamber offers a broad range of publications to all interested companies, members or private persons. The following publications are the most common ones:

- The quarterly UPDATE e-magazine
- Annual reports

The GTCC's quarterly e-magazine, called UPDATE, contains several main sections and focuses on specific industry or area, also covering trade & investment, new technology, trade fairs and a contact section where German and Thai companies seek trading, licensing and joint-venture partners. Each year, the GTCC publishes its Annual Report, summarizing the chamber's activities throughout the year.
