= The Nigerian-German Chamber of Commerce =

The Nigerian-German Chamber of Commerce, formerly known as Nigerian-German Business Association was created in 1986 to foster bilateral trade between Nigeria and Germany. The Nigerian-German Business Association (NGBA) creates a bilateral relationship between the countries and aims at strengthening their business opportunities through adequate networking, investment promotion and trade.

Nigeria is Germany's biggest trading partner in the West African sub-region.

Companies who are members of the NGBA have access to the AHK, part of the German Chambers of Commerce, in 120 locations and 80 countries across five continents.
