= Nigerians in Germany =

Total population
- 72,000

Languages
- German, Nigerian languages

Religion
- Christianity, Islam

As of November 2019, official German statistics report that approximately 72,000 individuals with Nigerian migration backgrounds reside in Germany, representing the largest sub-Saharan African community in Germany.

== See also ==
- Germany–Nigeria relations
