= Germany–Nigeria relations =

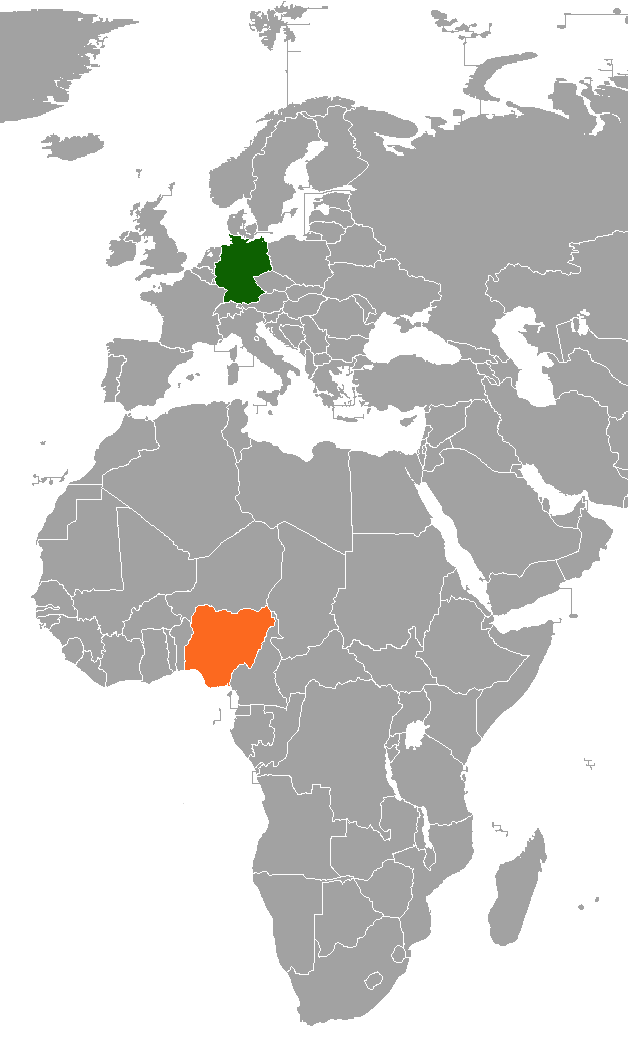

- Germany: Nigeria

Germany–Nigeria relations are the bilateral relations between the Federal Republic of Germany and Federal Republic of Nigeria. Nigeria operates an Embassy in Berlin and Germany operates an Embassy in Abuja. Germany has a Consulate-General in Lagos and Nigeria has a Consulate-General in Frankfurt.

== History ==
German-Nigerian relations go back over 160 years to the period of Colonial Nigeria.

Chancellor Angela Merkel was the first foreign leader outside Africa to visit Nigeria after Goodluck Johnathan's election in 2011. President Muhammadu Buhari visited Elmau, Germany, to attend the 41st G7 summit in 2015. It was his first visit to a country outside of Africa since his election.

In 2019, the German consulate in Lagos called for increased spending on Nigeria's infrastructure to facilitate better trade between Nigeria and Germany. Later that year, President Buhari signed a deal with German energy company, Siemens, to generate at least 25,000 megawatts of electricity for Nigeria's electric grid by 2025.

== Culture ==
Germany founded a Goethe-Institut in Lagos in 1962. In 2021, German Minister of Culture announced they would be returning hundreds of art objects to Nigeria that were looted from the Benin Royal Palace in 1897.

Benin Bronzes in German museums were transferred to Nigeria at the end of 2022. The bronzes were handed over to Nigeria in a ceremonial act of state by Foreign Minister Annalena Baerbock and Minister of State for Culture Claudia Roth in the Nigerian capital Abuja. In May 2023, it was announced that ownership of the bronzes already handed over and those still to be handed over had been transferred by President Mohammedu Buhari to the current head of the royal family responsible for the slave hunt at the time, Oba Ewuare II.

=== Sports ===
Five Germans have coached the Nigerian national football team: Gernot Rohr (2016–2021), Berti Vogts (2007–2008), Manfred Hoener (1988–1989), Gottlieb Göller (1981) and Karl-Heinz Marotzke (1970-1971 and 1974).

Some Nigerian footballers were or are also active in German football clubs, including Victor Agali, Jonathan Akpoborie, Leon Balogun, Manasseh Ishiaku, Chinedu Obasi, Pascal Ojigwe, Jay-Jay Okocha, Sunday Oliseh, Solomon Okoronkwo and Anthony Ujah.

== Development aid ==
The Deutsche Gesellschaft für Internationale Zusammenarbeit (GIZ) has been active in Nigeria since 1974. It has had a country office in Abuja since 2004. Its activities focus on economic development and employment, security, reconstruction and peace as well as governance and democracy.

In 2020, the German government pledged 100 million euros for Borno State to assist with droughts and food shortages, due to the shrinking of Lake Chad. The government has also assisted in training the Nigerian Armed Forces to fight Boko Haram. Germany has supported Nigeria's fight in eradicating polio, which was eradicated from Nigeria in 2021.

== Business ==
The Nigerian-German Chamber of Commerce was created in 1986 for fostering bilateral trade between Germany and Nigeria and has since deepened economic ties between the two countries.

In 2011, the German-Nigerian Binational Commission was created to bolster cooperation in business, education, energy, migration issues and culture. Germany has started various projects in Nigeria meant to assist the Nigerian government.

=== Trade ===
Nigeria, as of 2019, was Germany's second-largest trading partner in Sub-Saharan Africa.

In 2019, Germany exported US$1.2 Billion worth of goods to Nigeria. Top exports from Germany to Nigeria include Rubber working machinery and cars. Nigeria in 2019 exported US$2.6 billion worth of goods to Germany, with the most common export being crude petroleum followed by cocoa.

== Immigration ==
As of 2021, there are about 83,000 Nigerians living in Germany; Nigerians have very high rates of employment in Germany among immigrants, second only to Pakistanis.

Cities with notable Nigerian populations are Berlin, Bremen, Hamburg, Hanover and Munich.

Rhein-Ruhr, Berlin, Köln-Bonn, Rhein-Main and Hanover-Braunschweig are the regions with the most predominantly present Nigerian populations in Germany.

Rank	City	Population
1	Berlin	9,766
2	Hamburg	4,612
3	Bremen	3,100
4	Cologne	2,542
5	Munich	2,373
6	Hanover	2,333
7	Frankfurt	2,185
8	Stuttgart	1,986
9	Düsseldorf	1,754
10	Dortmund	1,631
11	Duisburg	1,452
12	Braunschweig	1,322
13	Bonn	1,276
14	Nürnberg	1,046
15	Mannheim	981

== German organizations in Nigeria ==
- German Embassy Abuja
- German General Consulate Lagos
- Goethe-Institut Lagos
- Friedrich-Ebert-Stiftung Abuja
- Konrad-Adenauer-Stiftung Office in Abuja
- Heinrich-Böll-Stiftung with main office in Abuja und branch in Lagos
- Auslandshandelskammer in Lagos

== See also ==
- Foreign relations of Germany
- Foreign relations of Nigeria
