= Centre d'Etudes Diplomatiques et Stratégiques =

Postgraduate educational institution and think-tank in Paris

Coordinates: 48.872013°N 2.300569°E

Centre d'Études Diplomatiques et Stratégiques
- Type: Postgraduate School for diplomats, military officers and executives. Partner Postgraduate School of the French École Militaire.
- Established: 1986 as a graduate school - 1899 as a College by Émile Durkheim
- Affiliations: Academic Council of the United Nations System
- Director: Pascal Chaigneau
- Administrative staff: 150
- Students: 80
- Postgraduates: Masters, Ph.D.
- Location: Paris, France
- Campus: Paris, Athens, La Paz, Dakar
- Colours: Yellow, purple and white
- Website: www.ceds.fr

The Center for Diplomatic and Strategic Studies (French: Centre d'Études Diplomatiques et Stratégiques, CEDS) is an accredited postgraduate school and a think tank in diplomacy and international relations headquartered in Paris. CEDS is the graduate and doctoral school of the Écoles des hautes études internationales et politiques (HEI-HEP), founded in 1899 by Émile Durkheim, Charles Seignobos, and Romain Rolland. In 1986, Pascal Chaigneau (HEC School of Management and Paris Descartes University), initiated CEDS as a specialized graduate school for officers, diplomats, and future executives. It is accredited as a Premier College by the Accreditation Service for International Colleges.

Initially a non-academic institution reserved to serving diplomats and either generals or senior officers, it also admits commissioned officers at large, executives, and senior civil servants (hauts fonctionnaires) linked to the diplomatic service. Among others, its Greek branch has educated the commanding officer of the Greek Navy's Frigate Command between him attending the Naval Postgraduate School and the Harvard Kennedy School of Government.

== Specific relationship with diplomats ==
Along with the Institut français, the CEDS is a de facto lever of the French diplomatic influence (Action française à l'étranger). It received French politician Jack Lang on September 25, 2009 for the inauguration of a Curriculum in International Relations delivered jointly with the Institut français à Athènes. One of its academic advisers and professors is Carlos Antonio Carrasco, ambassador of Bolivia.

== Faculty and research ==
=== Research ===
The CEDS edits the peer-reviewed academic journal Enjeux Diplomatiques et Stratégiques. It also publishes a limited number of its students' doctoral thesis as books either independently or via the publishing house l'Harmattan in Paris, in English, in the series "Diplomacy and Strategy".

=== Faculty ===
==== Military ====
The CEDS is formally associated to the French Joint Defence College and the ECOSOC of the United Nations. Among its faculty are antiterrorism and ICTY intelligence expert Raymond Carter, Jacques Walch of the French Army, and peace operations expert and Military Staff Committee representative Dominique Trinquand, who is also a former alumni of CEDS. Most of the military faculty of the CEDS also comes from the French Institut des hautes études de défense nationale.

==== Diplomatic ====
Ambassadors Michel Raimbaud (France), Carlos Carrasco (Bolivia), Cristina Aguiar (Dominican Republic), Mickaël Lebedev (Russian Federation), George Ayache (France), former cabinet member Dominique de Villepin, and Patrick Boursin (France) all teach at the CEDS, along with Andrei Gratchev, former spokesperson of Mikhail Gorbachev and member of the World Political Forum.

== Alumni ==
- Jean-Marc Aractingi- Diplomat
- Paul F.J. Aranas - U.S. author and lecturer
- Naela Chohan - Pakistani diplomat
- Michael J. Strauss - U.S. journalist and strategist
- Idriss Aberkane - French public speaker and essayist
- Khayyam AKBAR - Diplomat, Foreign Service of Pakistan
- BGen. Robert Mansour - Lebanon, Military
- Yakubu Dadu, Nigerian diplomat and Consul General at the Consulate General of Nigeria, Frankfurt, Germany.
- Christian Palocz - Chilean philosopher with studies at Columbia University, and another PhD in Philosophy at the European Graduate School (EGS) supervised by Catherine Malabou (2022). Author of Tibet y el Mundo (2008), and Re/evolución: Teoría General de Resolución de Conflictos. (2025)
- Niranjan Man Singh Basnyat, Nepal (2008), Former Ambassador to Malaysia.
