= List of diplomatic missions of Nigeria =

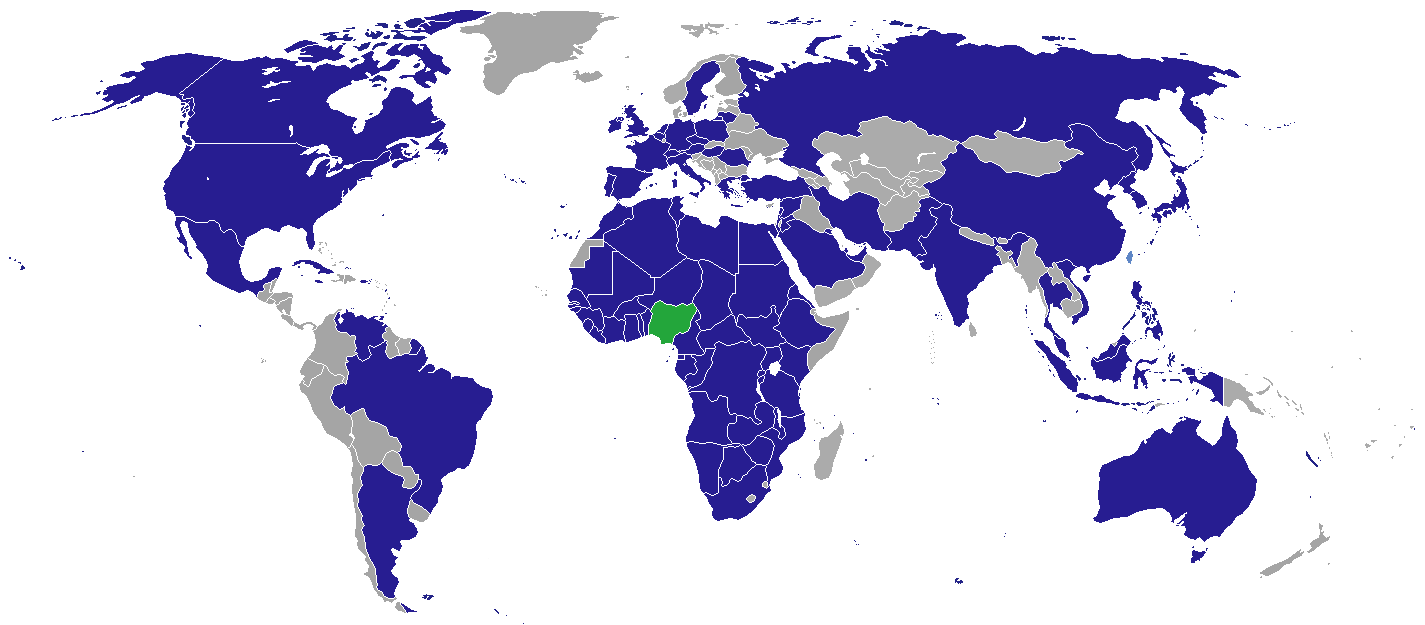
Map of Nigerian diplomatic missions

This is a list of diplomatic missions of Nigeria. Nigeria is the most populous African country and maintains a large network of diplomatic missions. The country has significant influence in Africa and in various multilateral fora, including the Organisation of Islamic Cooperation, OPEC, the Commonwealth, and the African Union.

Nigeria first started sending twelve diplomatic personnel overseas to serve in British missions from 1957. Upon independence three years later, the country created its own foreign ministry, headed by Foreign Minister Jaja Wachukwu. Now the Nigerian foreign ministry has over 2,000 officers.

== Current missions ==
=== Africa ===
Host country	Host city	Mission	Concurrent accreditation	Ref.
Algeria	Algiers	Embassy		
Angola	Luanda	Embassy		
Benin	Cotonou	Embassy		
Botswana	Gaborone	High Commission	International Organizations: Southern African Development Community (Note: Accredited as an observer mission.)	
Burkina Faso	Ouagadougou	Embassy		
Burundi	Bujumbura	Embassy		
Cameroon	Yaoundé	High Commission		
Cameroon	Douala	Consulate-General		
Cameroon	Buea	Consulate-General		
Central African Republic	Bangui	Embassy		
Chad	N'Djamena	Embassy		
Congo-Brazzaville	Brazzaville	Embassy		
Congo-Kinshasa	Kinshasa	Embassy		
Egypt	Cairo	Embassy	Countries: Palestine	
Equatorial Guinea	Malabo	Embassy		
Equatorial Guinea	Bata	Consulate		
Eritrea	Asmara	Embassy		
Ethiopia	Addis Ababa	Embassy	Countries: Djibouti; International Organizations: African Union; United Nations Economic Commission for Africa	
Gabon	Libreville	High Commission		
Gambia	Banjul	High Commission		
Ghana	Accra	High Commission		
Guinea	Conakry	High Commission		
Guinea-Bissau	Bissau	Embassy	Countries: Cape Verde	
Ivory Coast	Abidjan	Embassy		
Kenya	Nairobi	High Commission	Countries: Seychelles; Somalia; International Organizations: United Nations; United Nations Environment Programme; United Nations Human Settlements Programme	
Liberia	Monrovia	Embassy		
Libya	Tripoli	Embassy		
Malawi	Lilongwe	High Commission		
Mali	Bamako	Embassy		
Morocco	Rabat	Embassy		
Mozambique	Maputo	High Commission	Countries: Madagascar; Mauritius	
Namibia	Windhoek	High Commission		
Niger	Niamey	Embassy		
Rwanda	Kigali	High Commission		
São Tomé and Príncipe	São Tomé	Embassy		
Senegal	Dakar	Embassy	Countries: Mauritania	
Sierra Leone	Freetown	High Commission		
South Africa	Pretoria	High Commission	Countries: Eswatini; Lesotho	
South Africa	Johannesburg	Consulate-General	Countries: Eswatini; Lesotho	
South Sudan	Juba	Embassy		
Sudan	Khartoum	Embassy		
Tanzania	Dar es Salaam	High Commission	Countries: Comoros	
Togo	Lomé	High Commission		
Tunisia	Tunis	Embassy		
Uganda	Kampala	High Commission		
Zambia	Lusaka	High Commission		
Zimbabwe	Harare	Embassy		

=== Americas ===
Host country	Host city	Mission	Concurrent accreditation	Ref.
Argentina	Buenos Aires	Embassy	Countries: Chile; Peru; Uruguay	
Brazil	Brasília	Embassy	Countries: Bolivia; Paraguay	
Canada	Ottawa	High Commission		
Cuba	Havana	Embassy	Countries: Bahamas; Honduras; Nicaragua	
Jamaica	Kingston	High Commission	Countries: Belize; Dominican Republic; Haiti; International Organizations: International Seabed Authority	
Mexico	Mexico City	Embassy	Countries: Costa Rica; Guatemala; Panama	
Trinidad and Tobago	Port of Spain	High Commission	Countries: Barbados; Dominica; Grenada; Guyana; Suriname	
United States	Washington, D.C.	Embassy	International Organizations: Organization of American States	
United States	Atlanta	Consulate-General	International Organizations: Organization of American States	
United States	New York City	Consulate-General	International Organizations: Organization of American States	
Venezuela	Caracas	Embassy	Countries: Colombia; Ecuador	

=== Asia ===
Host country	Host city	Mission	Concurrent accreditation	Ref.
China	Beijing	Embassy	Countries: Mongolia	
China	Guangzhou	Consulate-General	Countries: Mongolia	
China	Hong Kong	Consulate-General	Countries: Mongolia	
China	Shanghai	Consulate-General	Countries: Mongolia	
India	New Delhi	High Commission	Countries: Bangladesh; Nepal; Sri Lanka	
Indonesia	Jakarta	Embassy	International Organizations: Association of Southeast Asian Nations	
Iran	Tehran	Embassy	Countries: Armenia; Azerbaijan; Kazakhstan	
Israel	Tel Aviv	Embassy	Countries: Cyprus	
Japan	Tokyo	Embassy		
Jordan	Amman	Embassy	Countries: Iraq	
Kuwait	Kuwait City	Embassy	Countries: Bahrain	
Lebanon	Beirut	Embassy		
Malaysia	Kuala Lumpur	High Commission	Countries: Brunei	
North Korea	Pyongyang	Embassy		
Pakistan	Islamabad	High Commission	Countries: Afghanistan; Maldives	
Philippines	Manila	Embassy	Countries: Cambodia	
Qatar	Doha	Embassy		
Republic of China (Taiwan)	New Taipei	Trade Office		
Saudi Arabia	Riyadh	Embassy	Countries: Oman; Yemen	
Saudi Arabia	Jeddah	Consulate-General	Countries: Oman; Yemen	
Singapore	Singapore	High Commission		
South Korea	Seoul	Embassy		
Syria	Damascus	Embassy		
Thailand	Bangkok	Embassy	Countries: Myanmar	
Turkey	Ankara	Embassy		
United Arab Emirates	Abu Dhabi	Embassy		
United Arab Emirates	Dubai	Consulate-General		
Vietnam	Hanoi	Embassy		

=== Europe ===
Host country	Host city	Mission	Concurrent accreditation	Ref.
Austria	Vienna	Embassy	Countries: Slovakia; International Organizations: United Nations; CTBTO Preparatory Commission; International Atomic Energy Agency; UNIDO	
Belgium	Brussels	Embassy	Countries: Luxembourg; International Organizations: European Union	
Bulgaria	Sofia	Liaison office (Note: Originally an embassy, was downgraded into a liaison office under the jurisdiction of the Nigerian embassy in Bucharest, Romania.)		
Czech Republic	Prague	Embassy		
France	Paris	Embassy	Countries: Monaco	
Germany	Berlin	Embassy		
Germany	Frankfurt	Consulate-General		
Greece	Athens	Embassy	Countries: Malta	
Holy See (Note: The Nigerian Embassy to the Holy See is located outside Vatican territory in Rome.)	Rome	Embassy		
Hungary	Budapest	Embassy	Countries: Bosnia and Herzegovina; Croatia; Serbia; Slovenia	
Ireland	Dublin	Embassy	Countries: Iceland	
Italy	Rome	Embassy	Countries: Albania	
Lithuania	Vilnius	Embassy	Countries: Estonia; Georgia; Latvia; Moldova; Ukraine	
Netherlands	The Hague	Embassy		
Poland	Warsaw	Embassy		
Portugal	Lisbon	Embassy		
Romania	Bucharest	Embassy	Countries: Bulgaria; Moldova	
Russia	Moscow	Embassy	Countries: Belarus	
Spain	Madrid	Embassy	International Organizations: World Tourism Organization	
Sweden	Stockholm	Embassy	Countries: Denmark; Finland; Norway	
Switzerland	Bern	Embassy	Countries: Liechtenstein	
United Kingdom	London	High Commission	International Organizations: Commonwealth of Nations	

=== Oceania ===
Host country	Host city	Mission	Concurrent accreditation	Ref.
Australia	Canberra	High Commission	Countries: Fiji; New Zealand; Papua New Guinea; Vanuatu	

=== Multilateral organisations ===
Organization	Host city	Host country	Mission	Concurrent accreditation	Ref.
ECOWAS	Abuja	Nigeria	Permanent Mission		
United Nations	New York City	United States	Permanent Mission		
United Nations	Geneva	Switzerland	Permanent Mission	International Organizations: International Labour Organization; International Organization for Migration; International Telecommunication Union; World Health Organization; World Intellectual Property Organization; World Trade Organization	
UNESCO	Paris	France	Permanent Delegation		

== Gallery ==
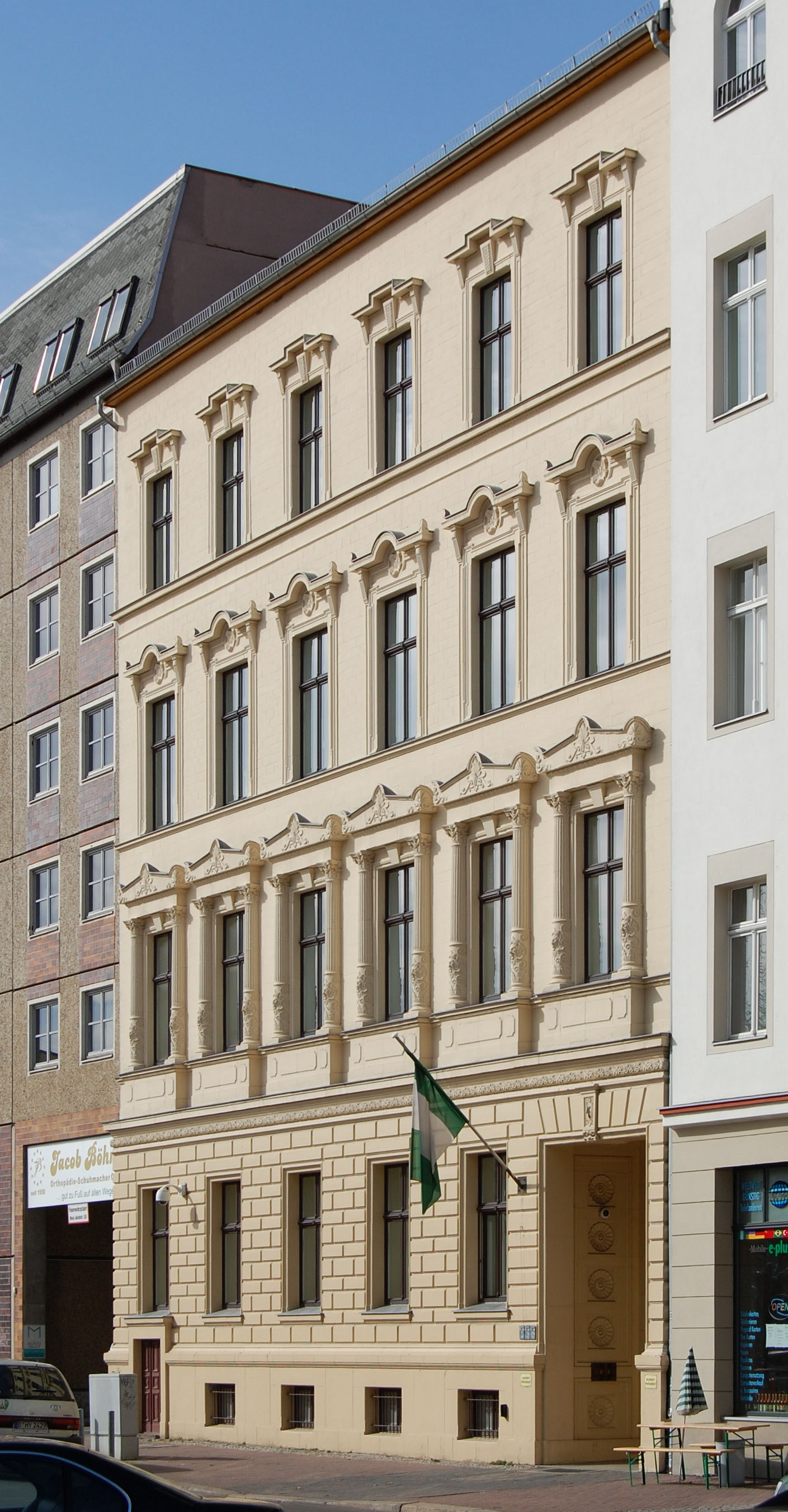
Embassy in Berlin

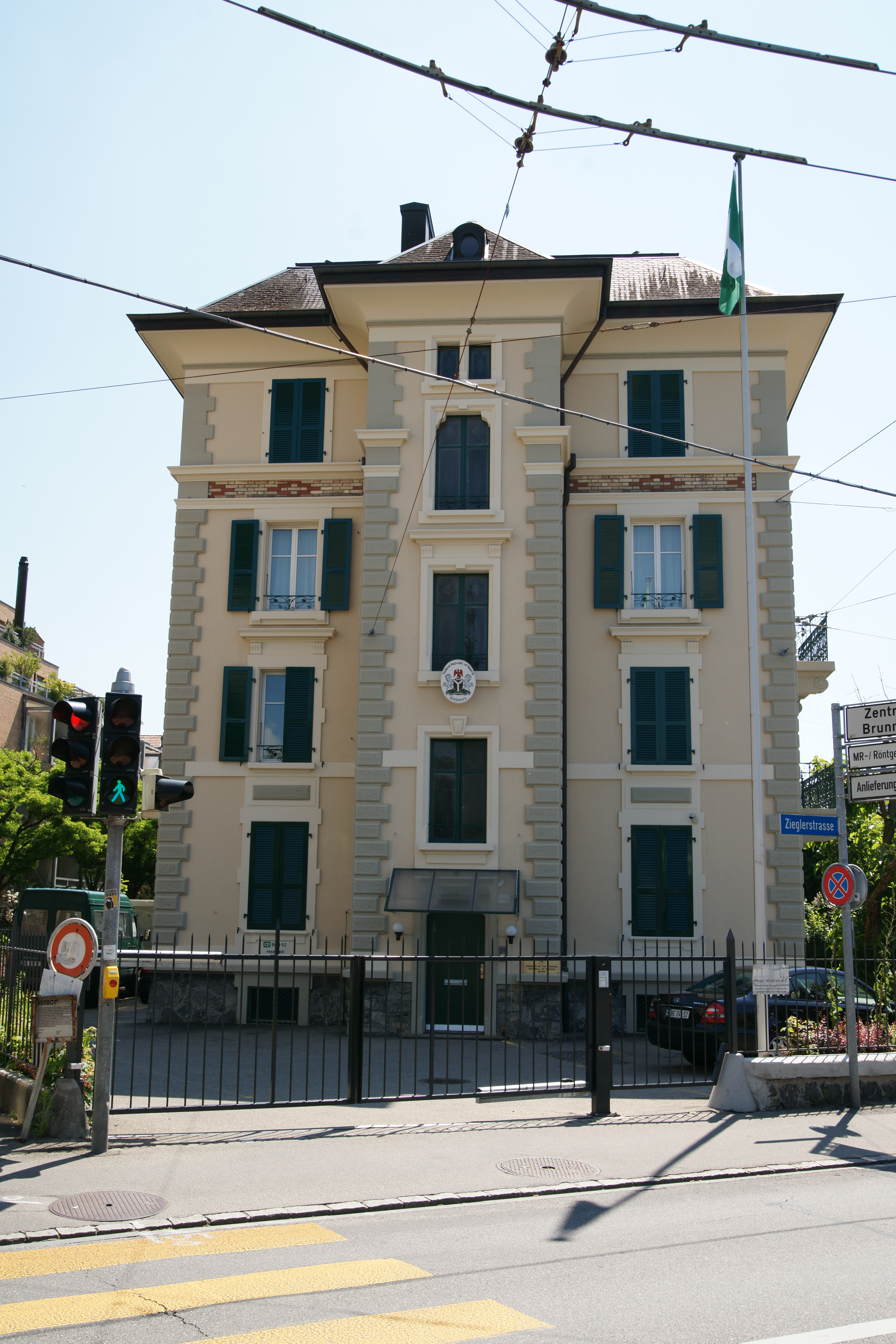
Embassy in Bern

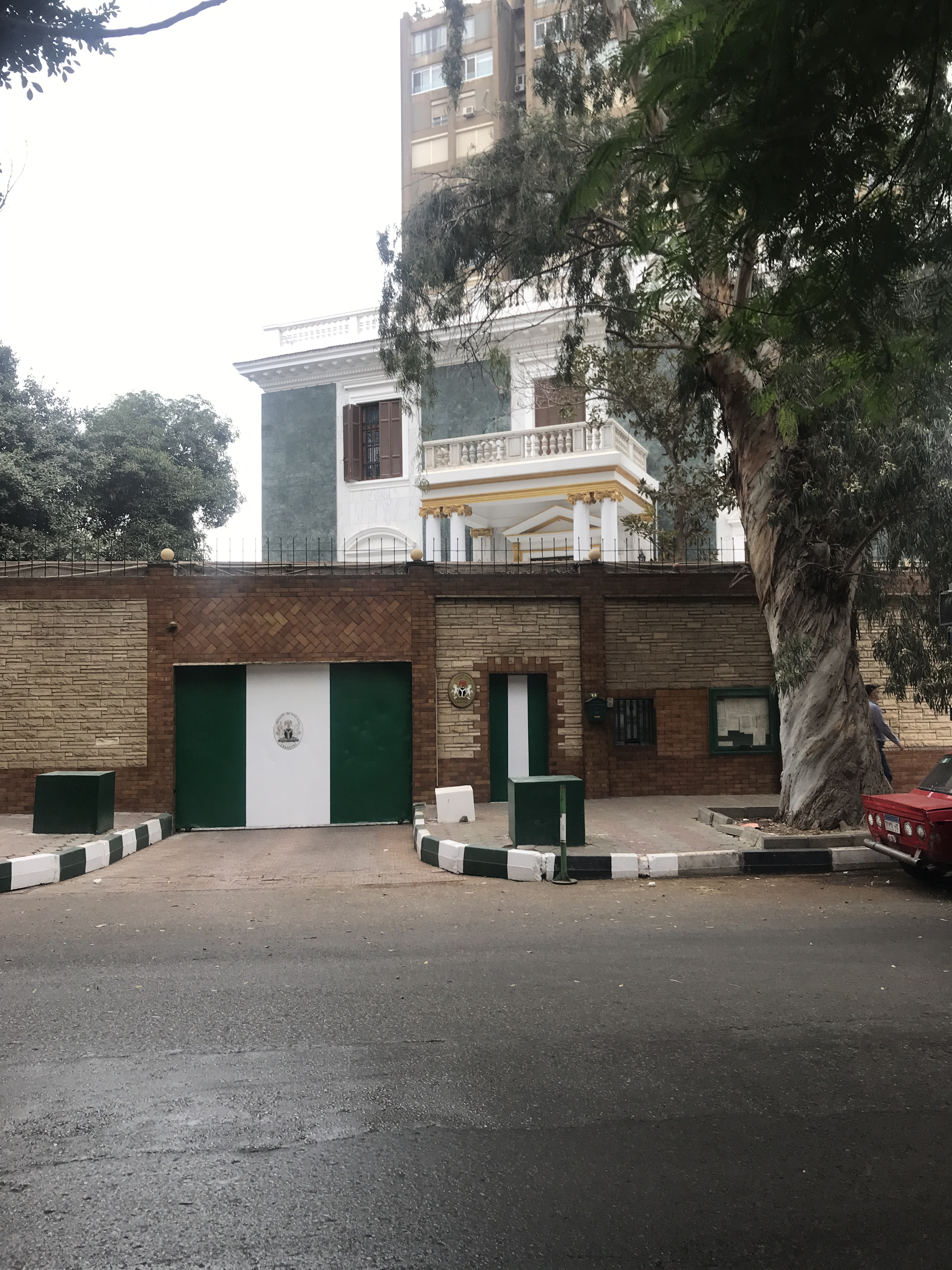
Embassy in Cairo

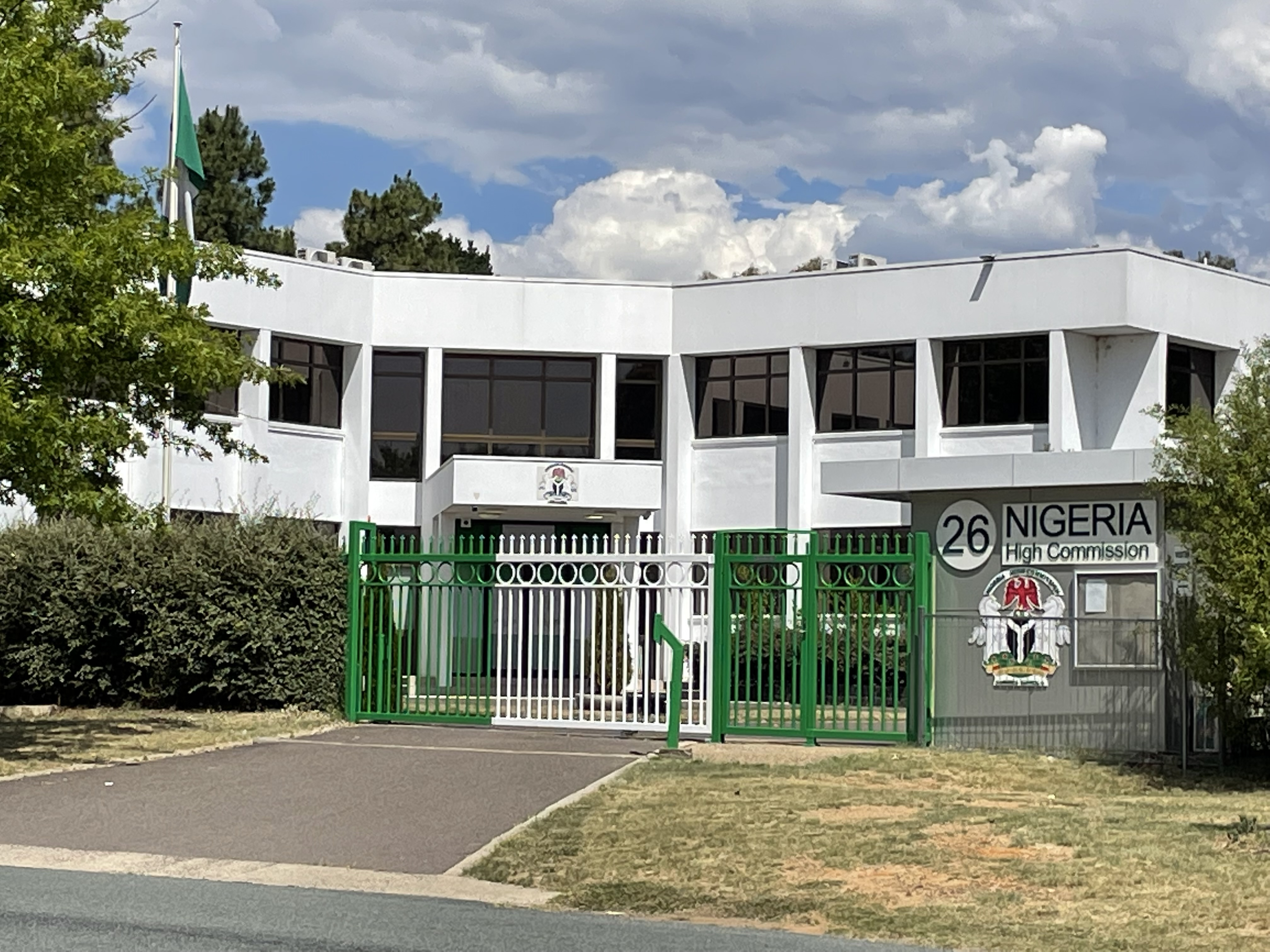
High Commission in Canberra

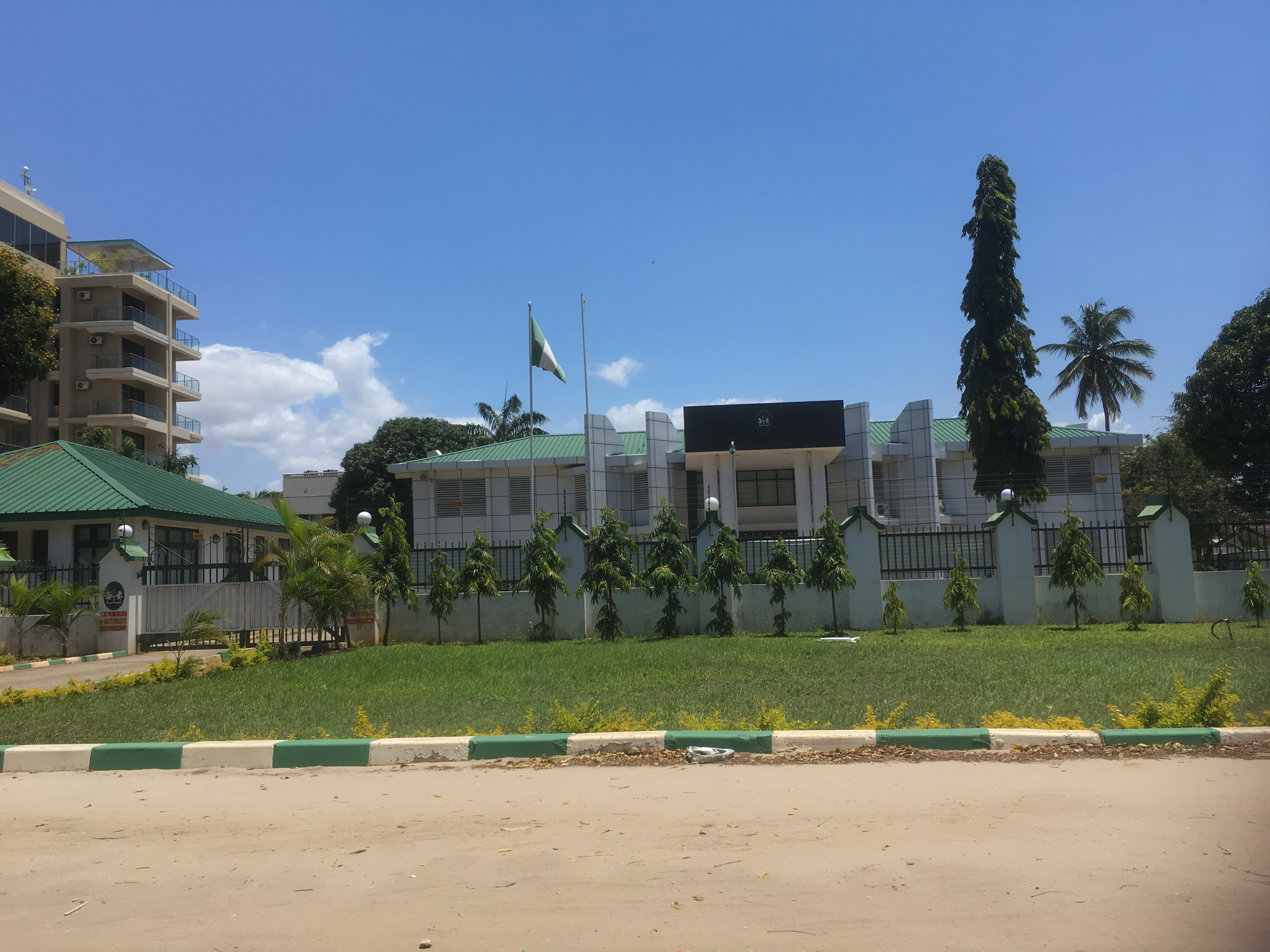
High Commission in Dar es Salaam

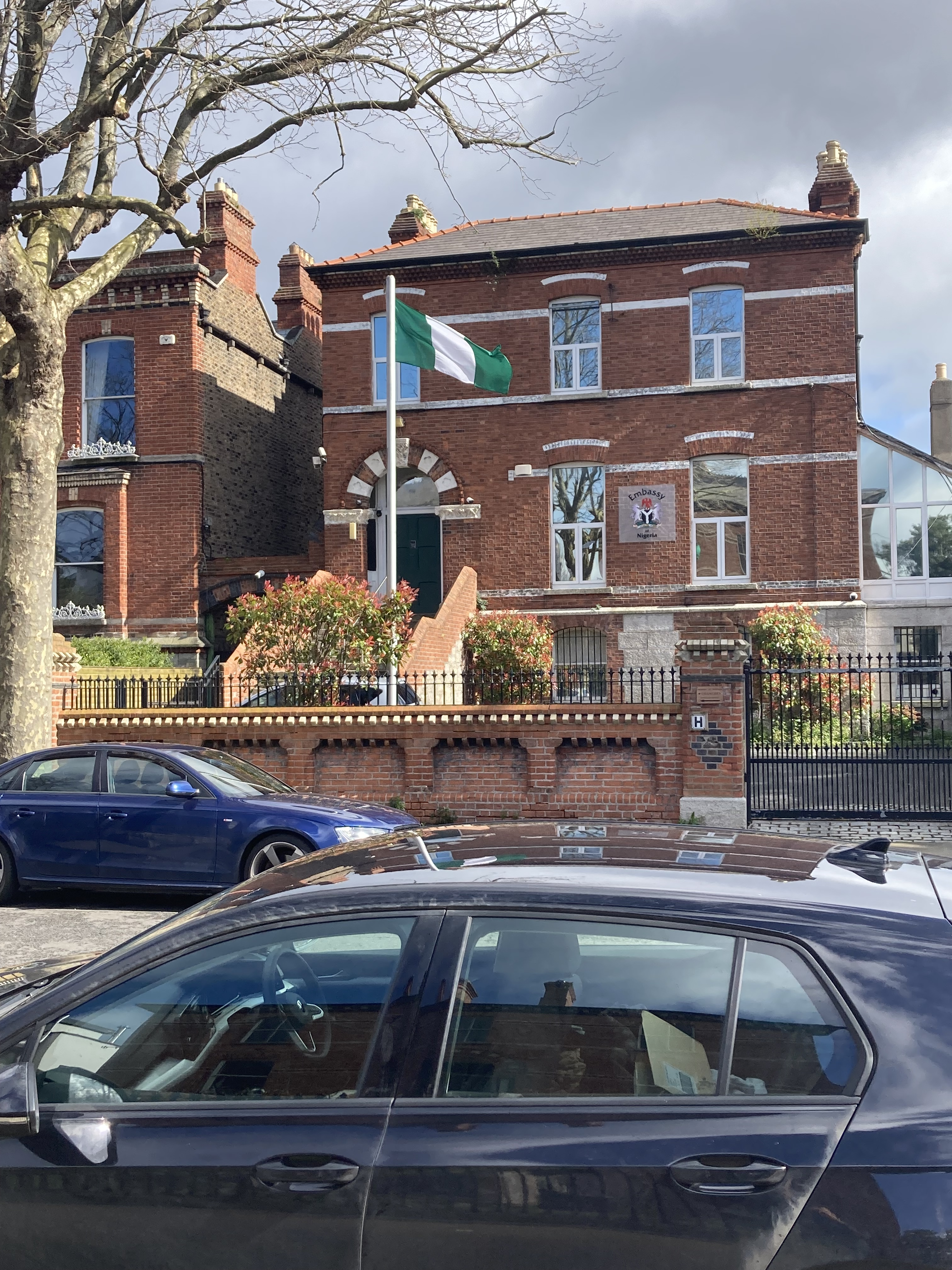
Embassy in Dublin

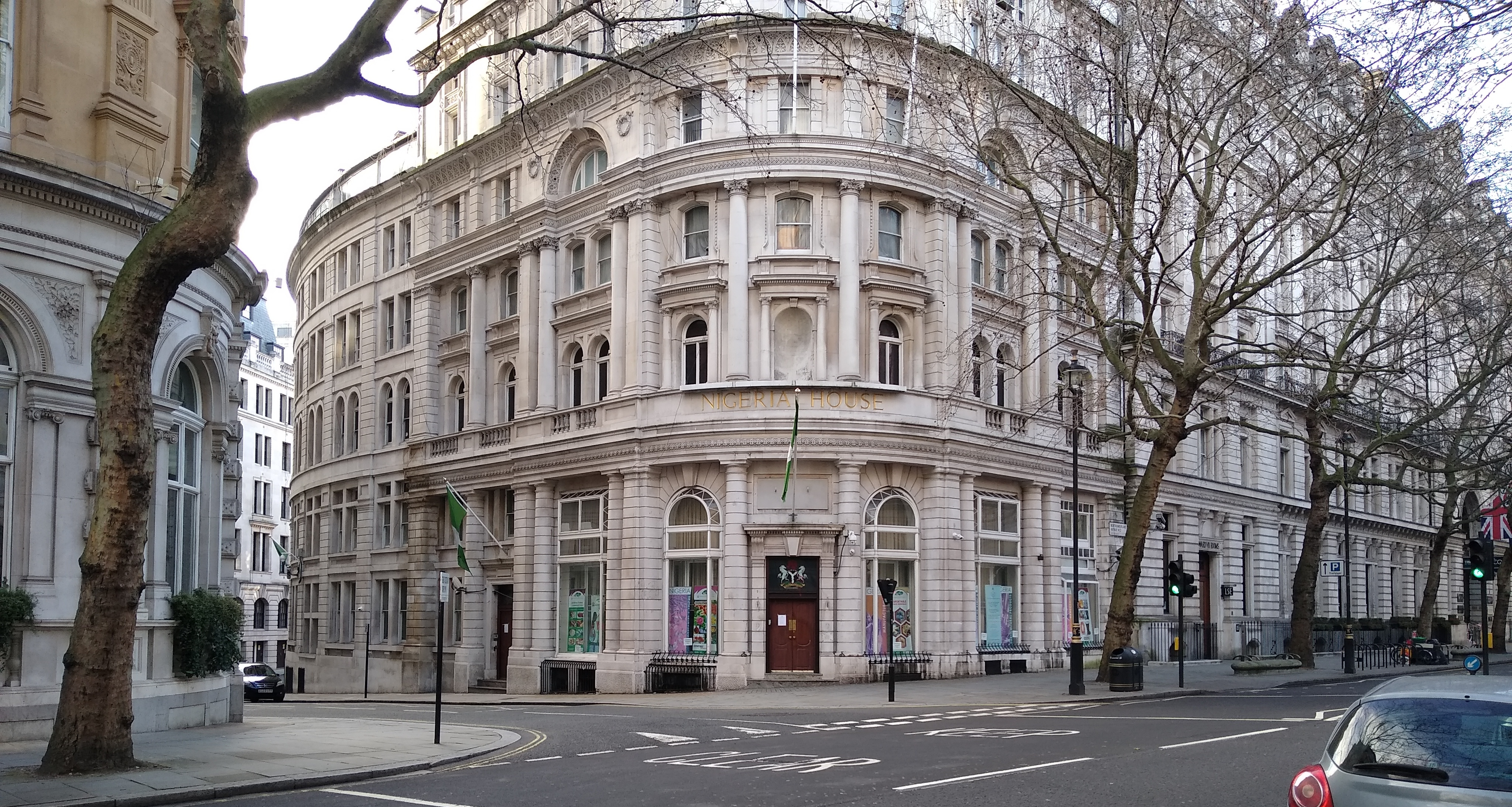
High Commission in London

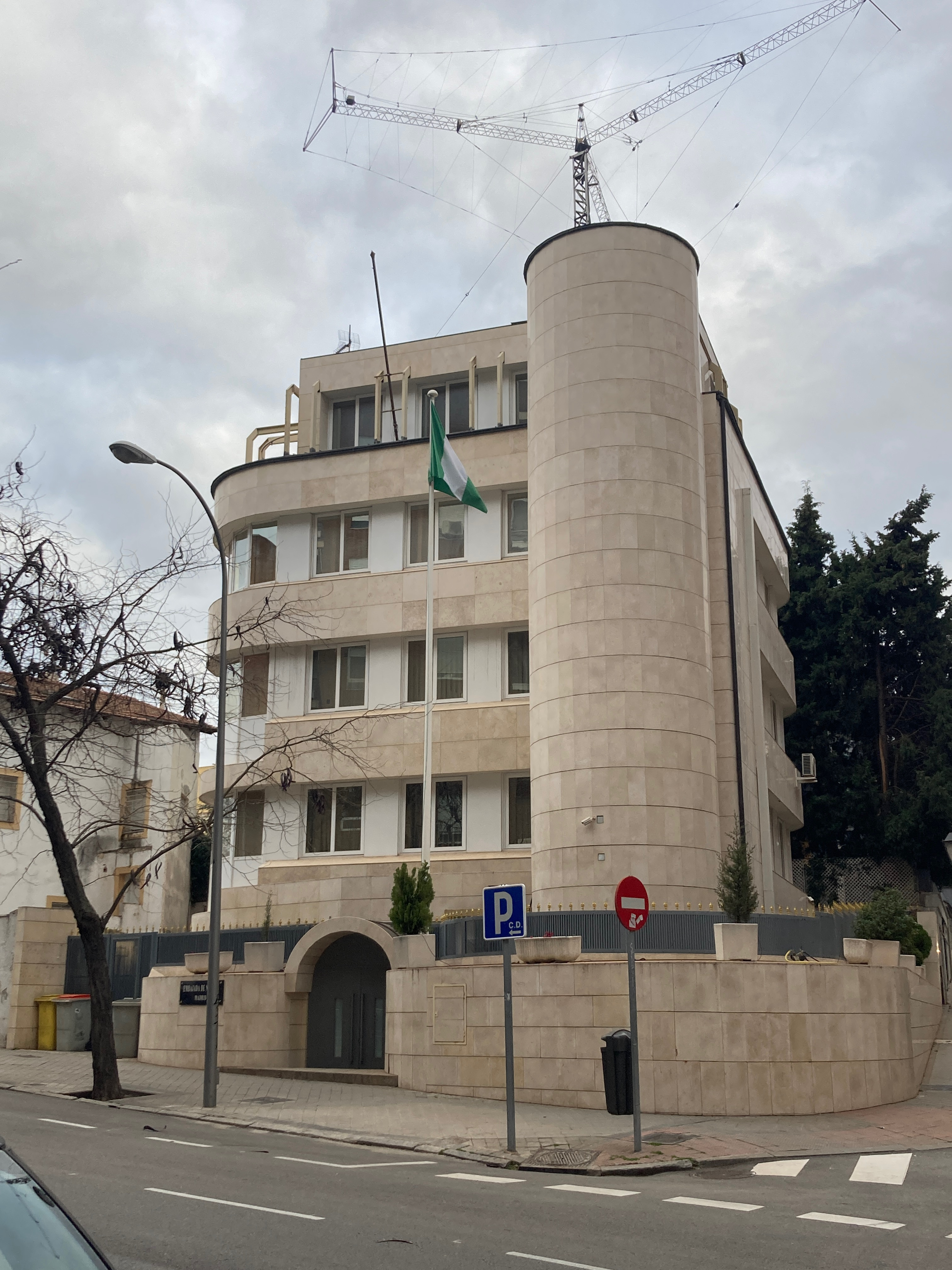
Embassy in Madrid

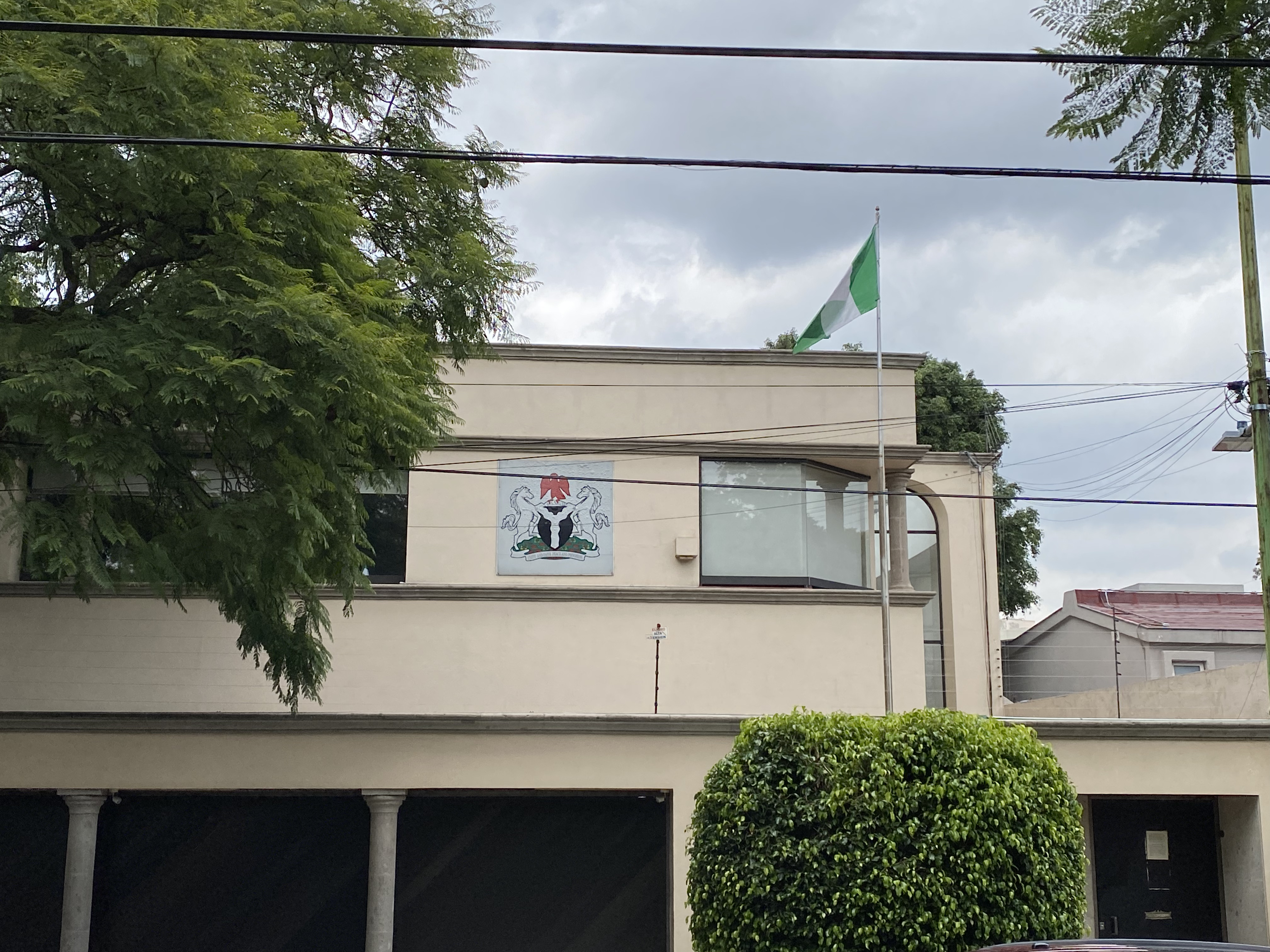
Embassy in Mexico City

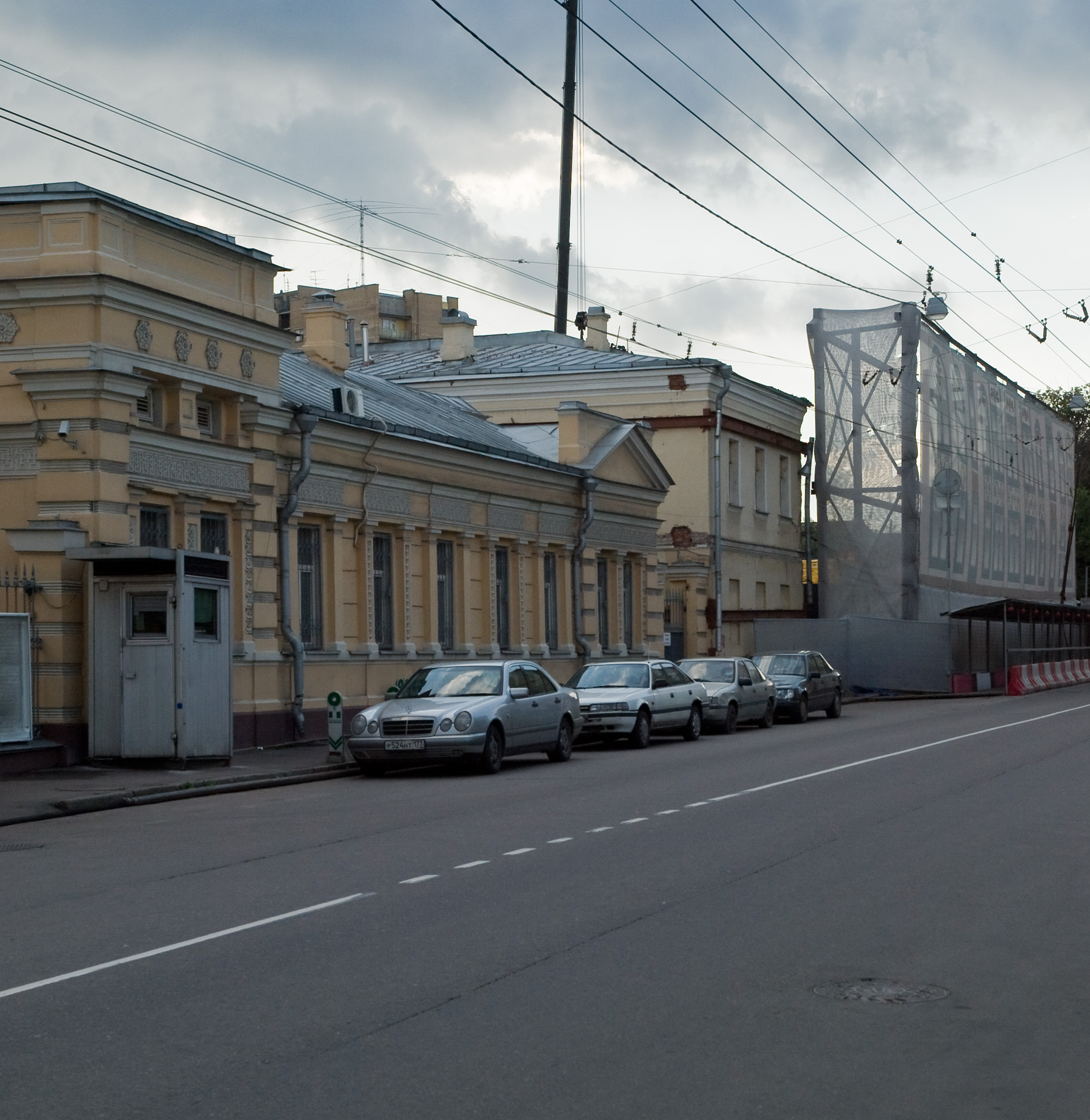
Embassy in Moscow

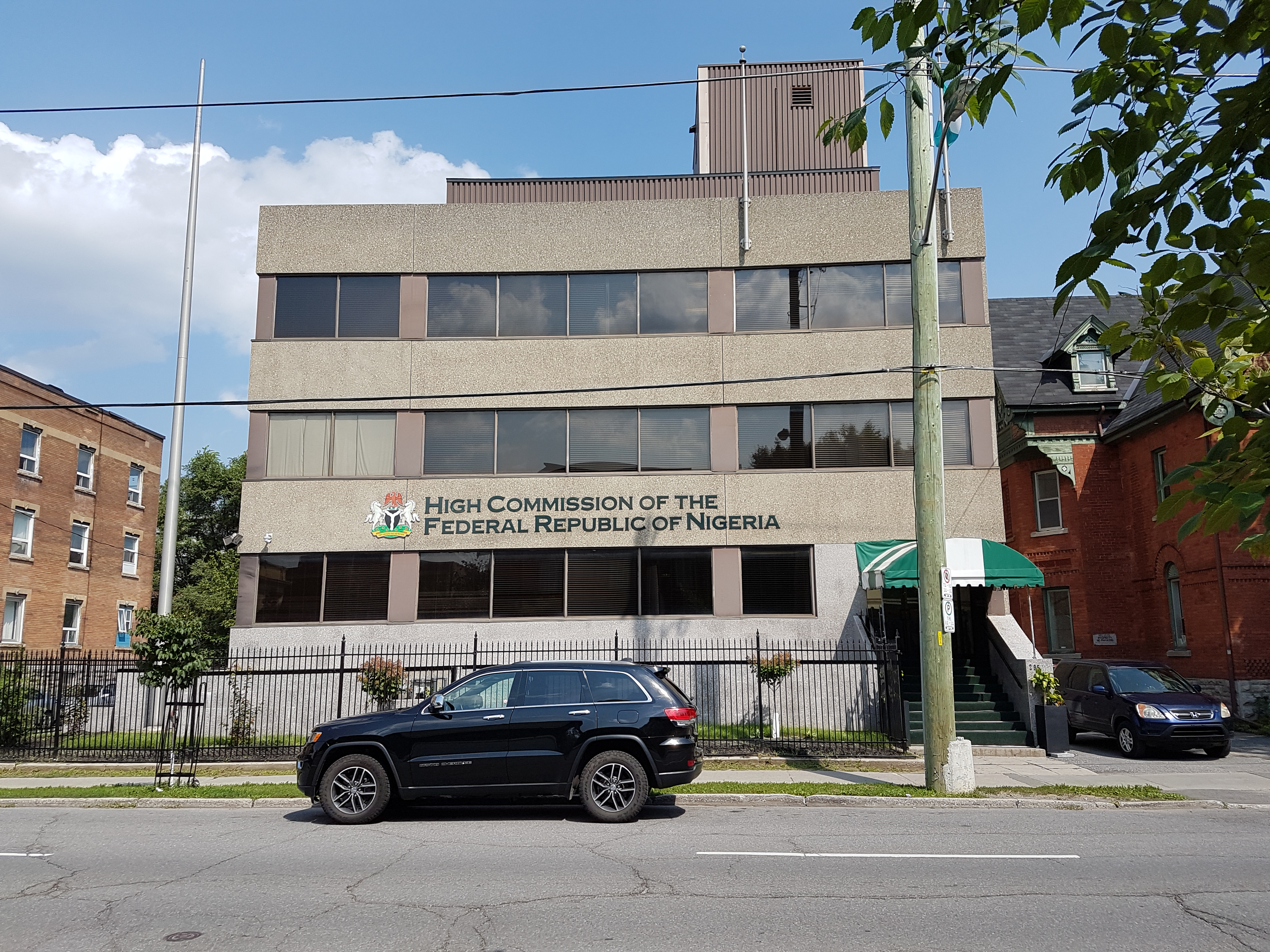
High Commission in Ottawa

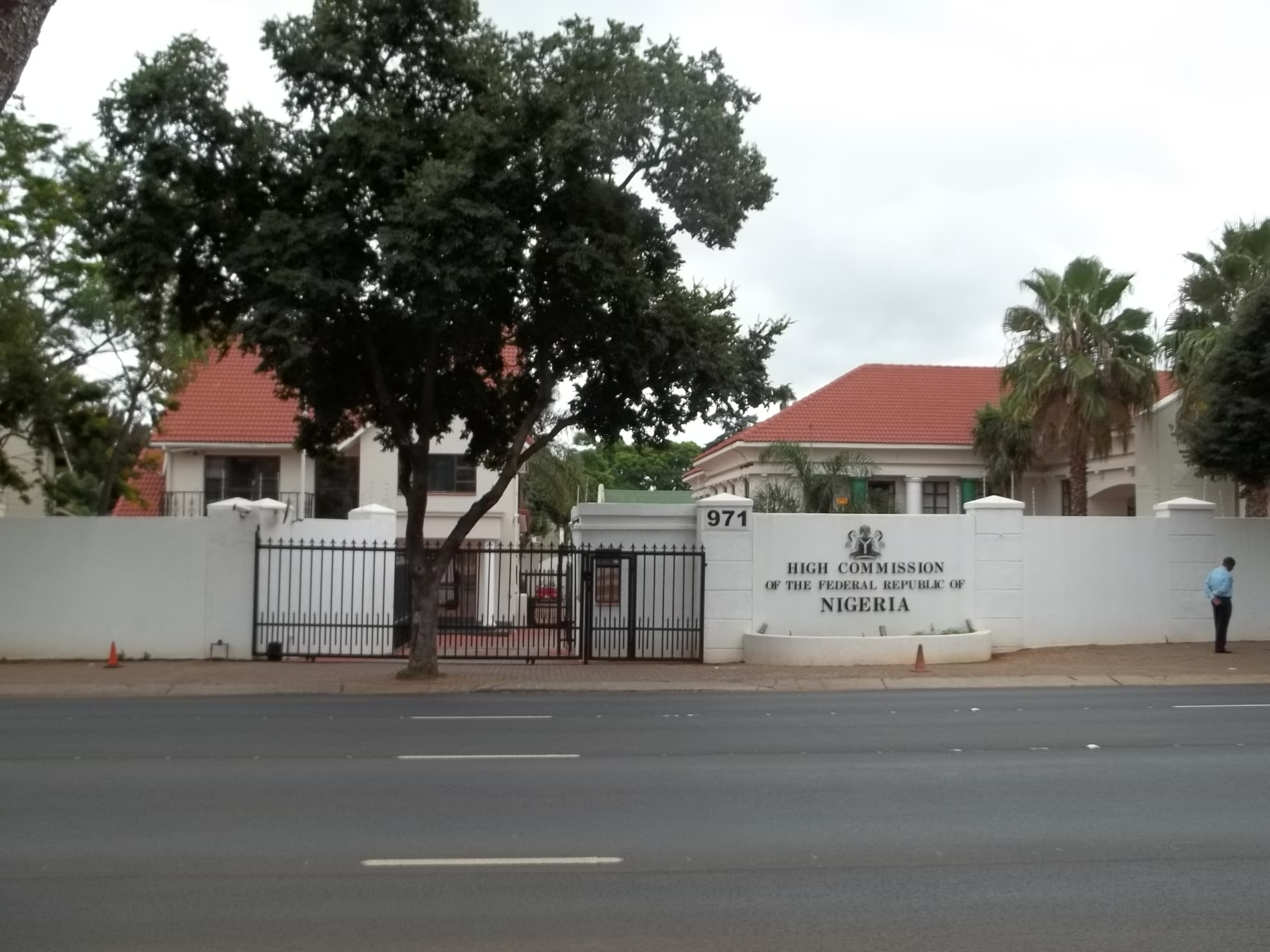
High Commission in Pretoria

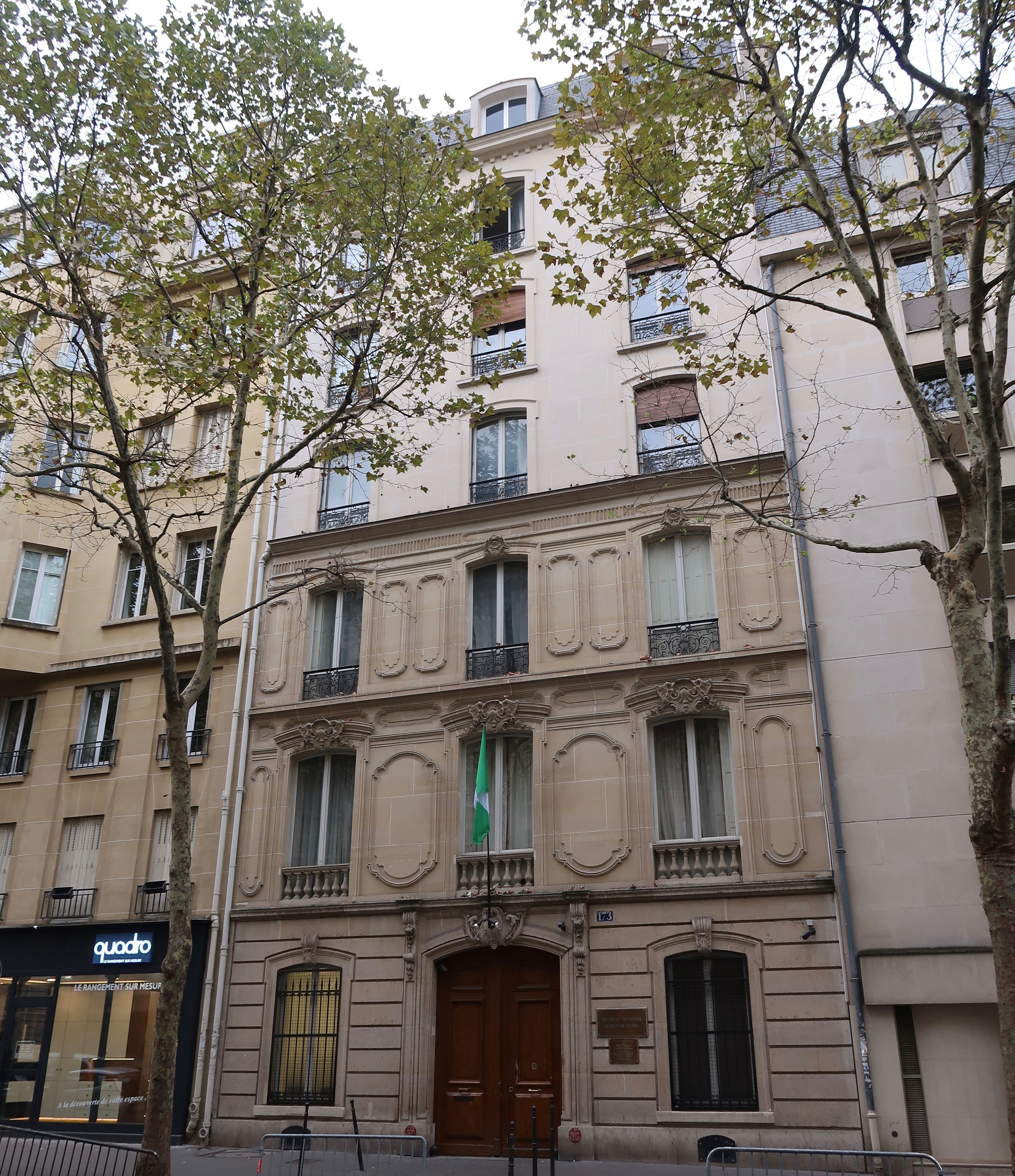
Embassy in Paris

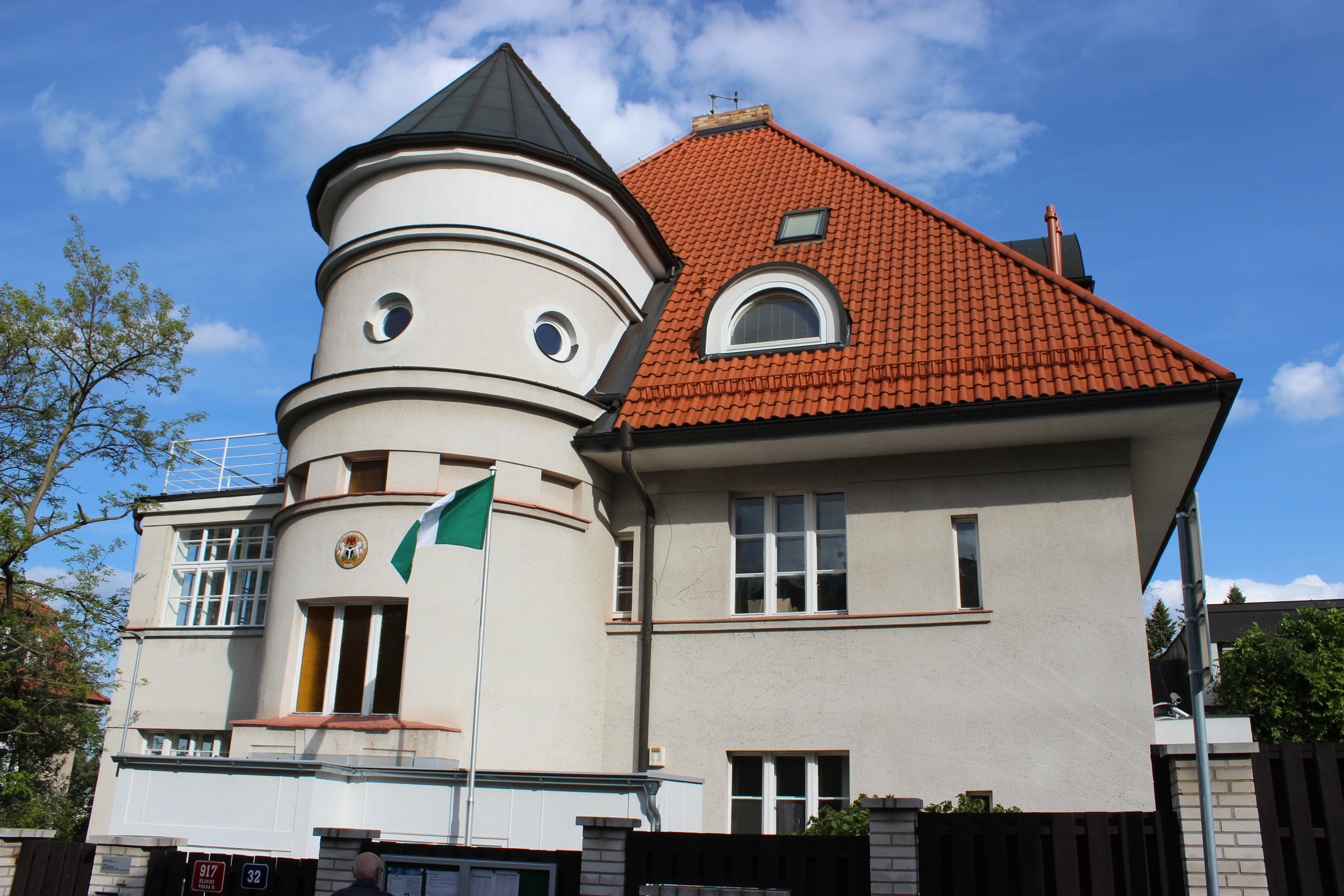
Embassy in Prague

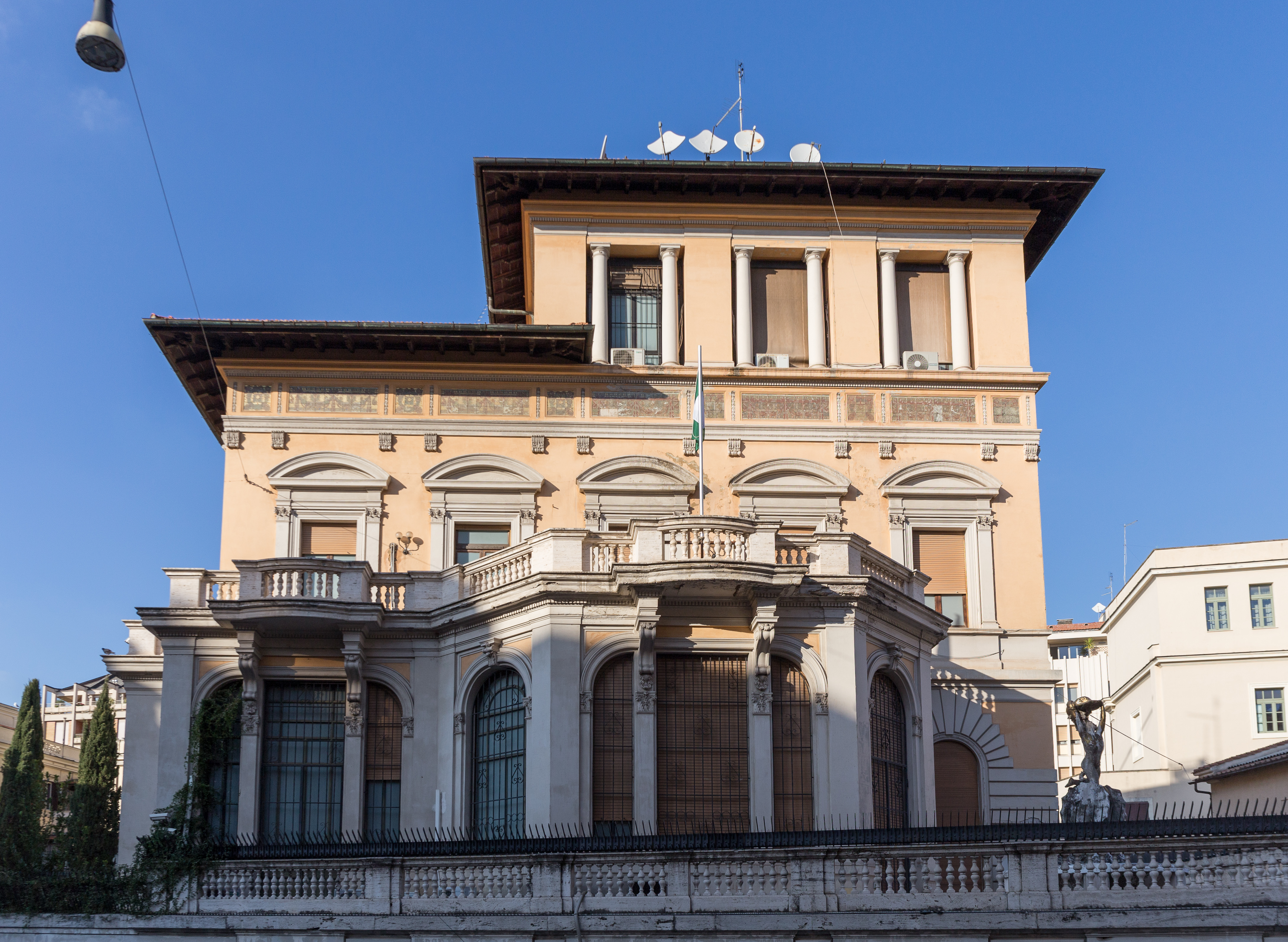
Embassy in Rome

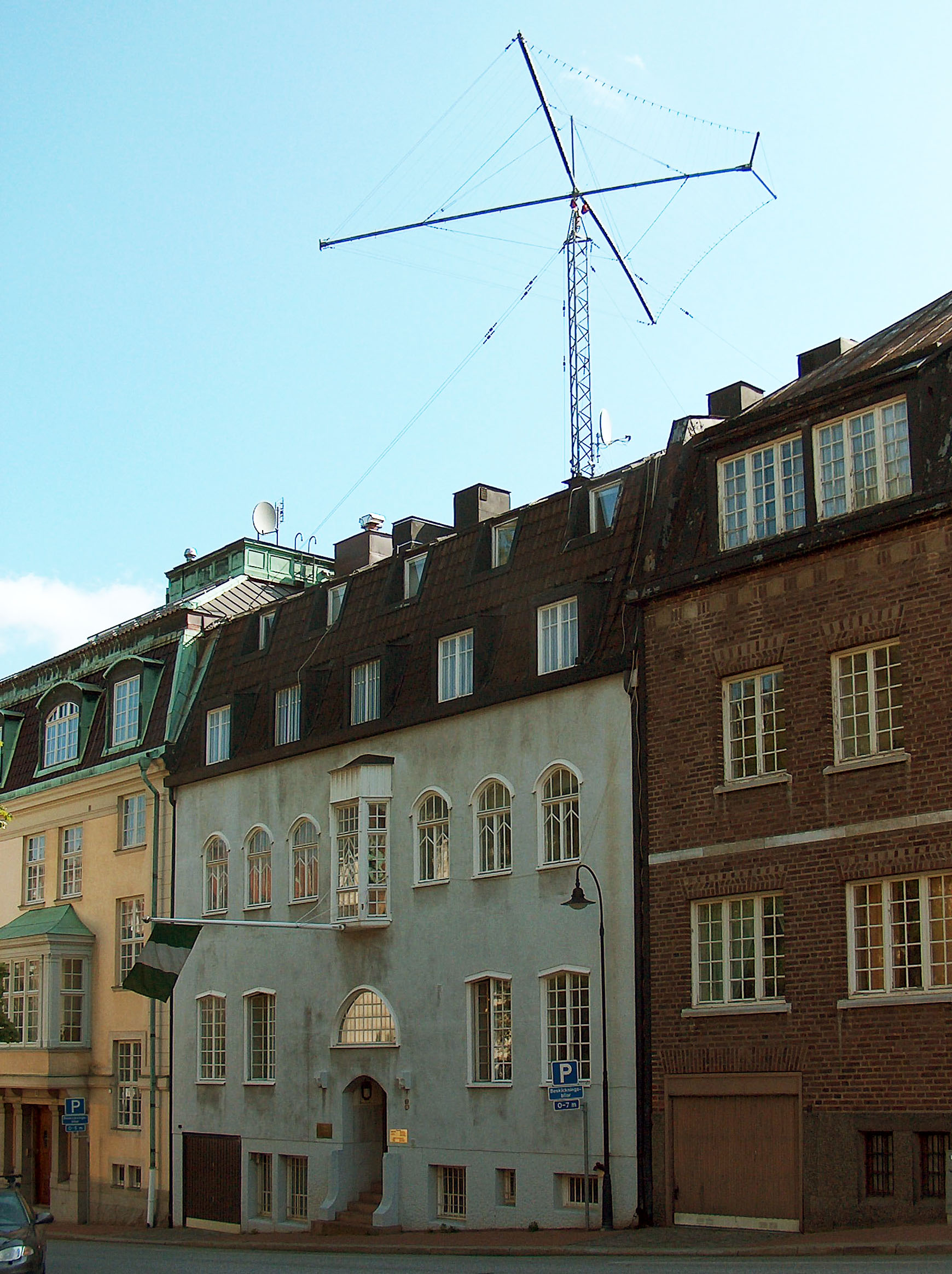
Embassy in Stockholm

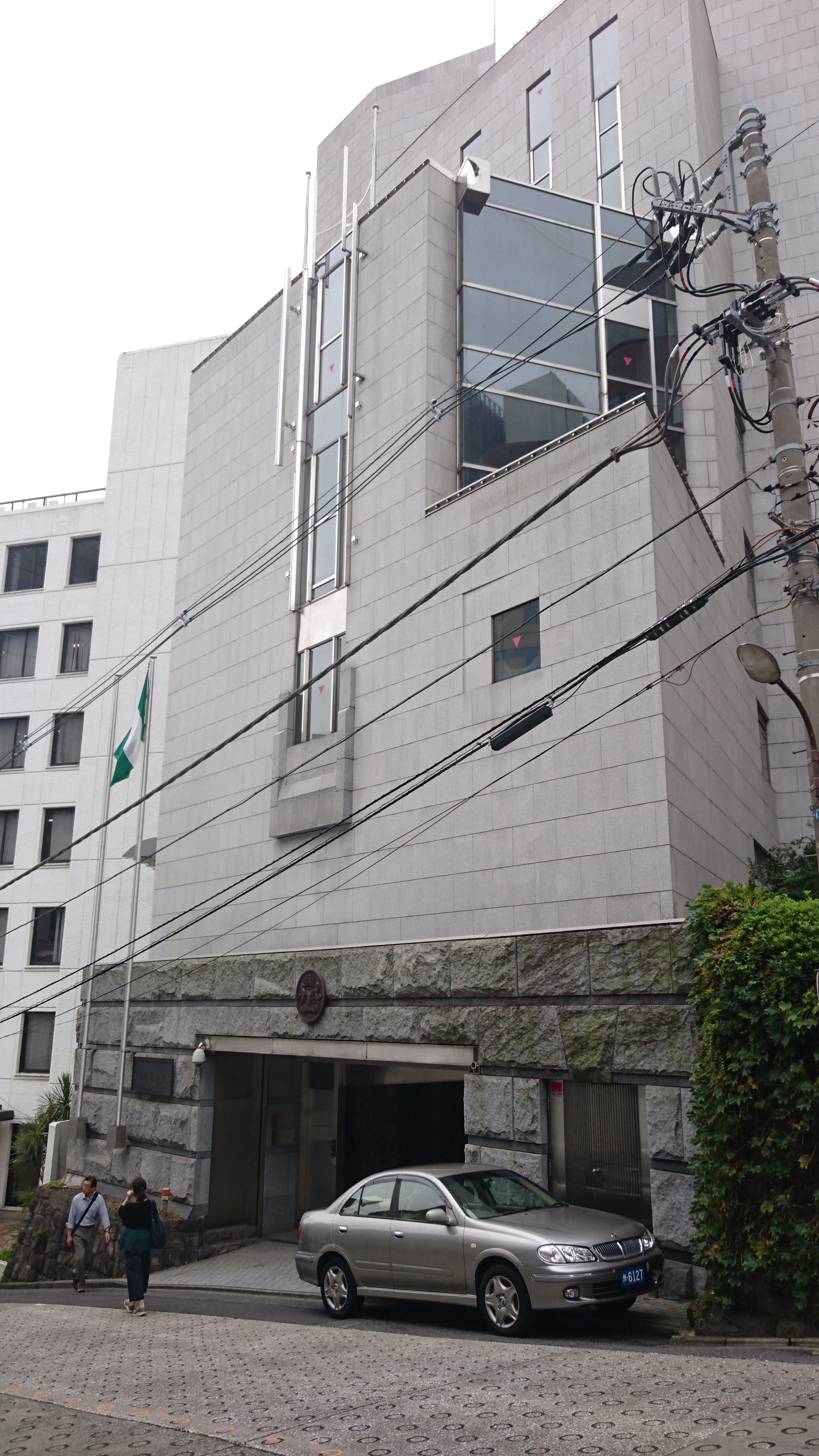
Embassy in Tokyo

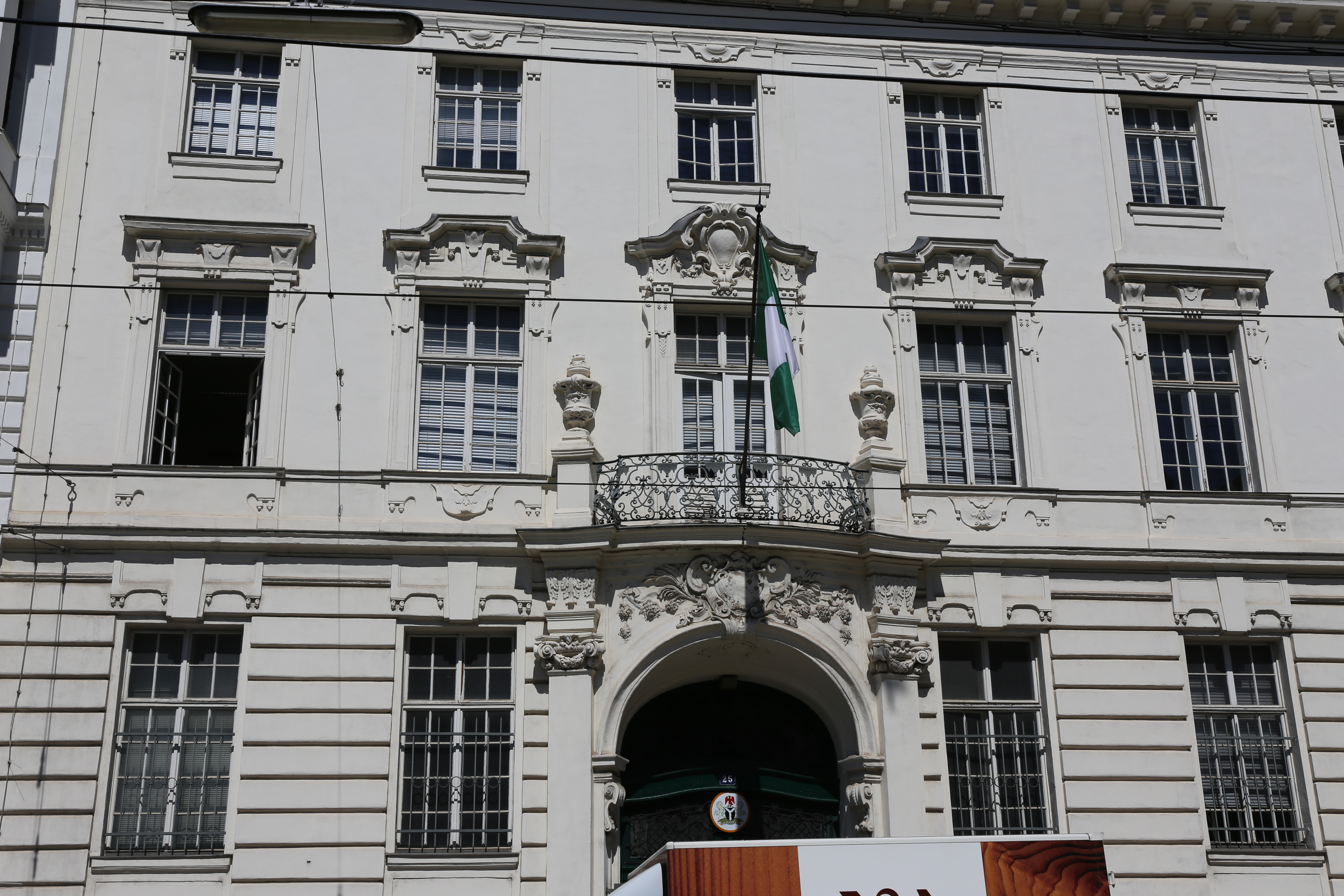
Embassy in Vienna

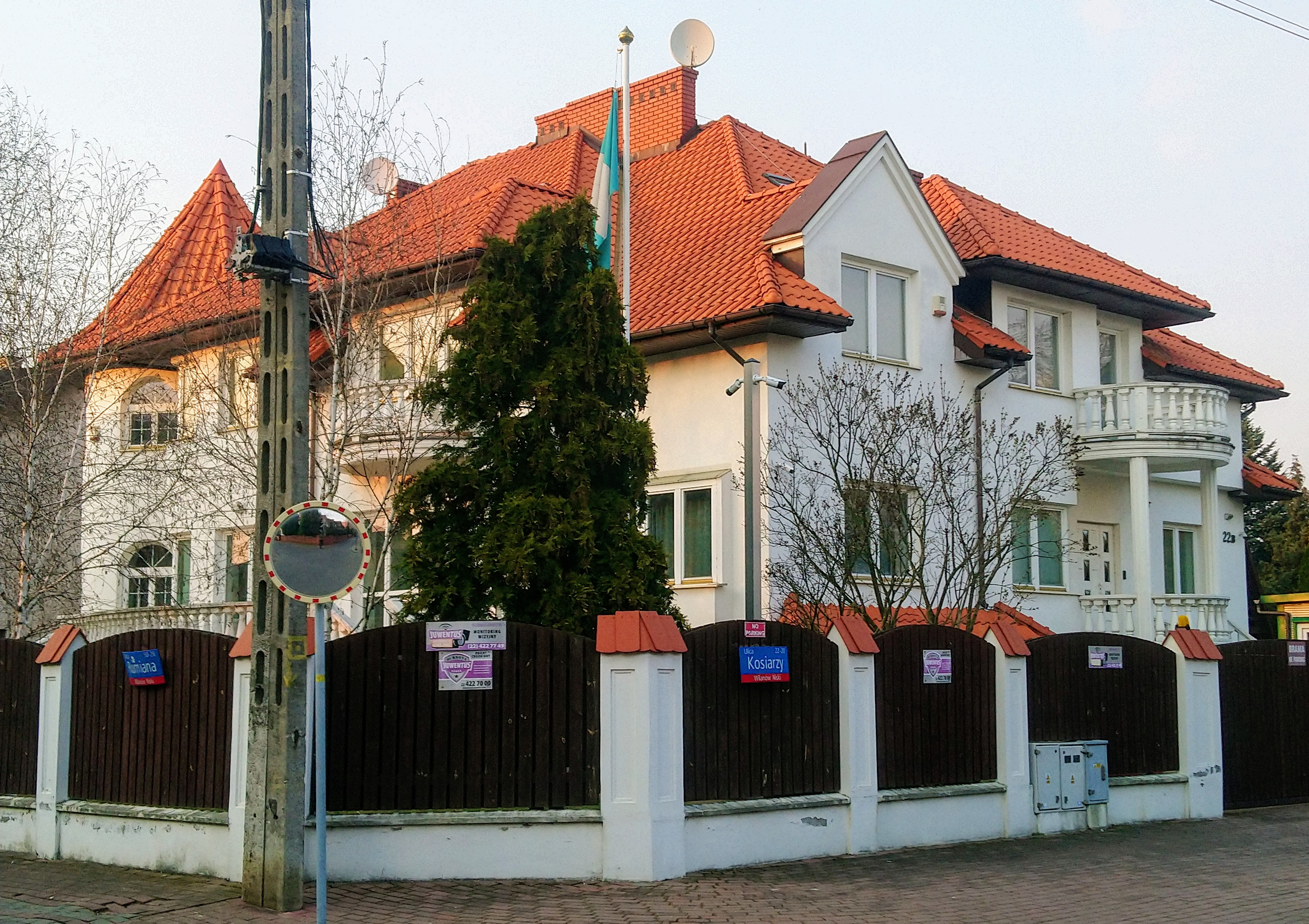
Embassy in Warsaw

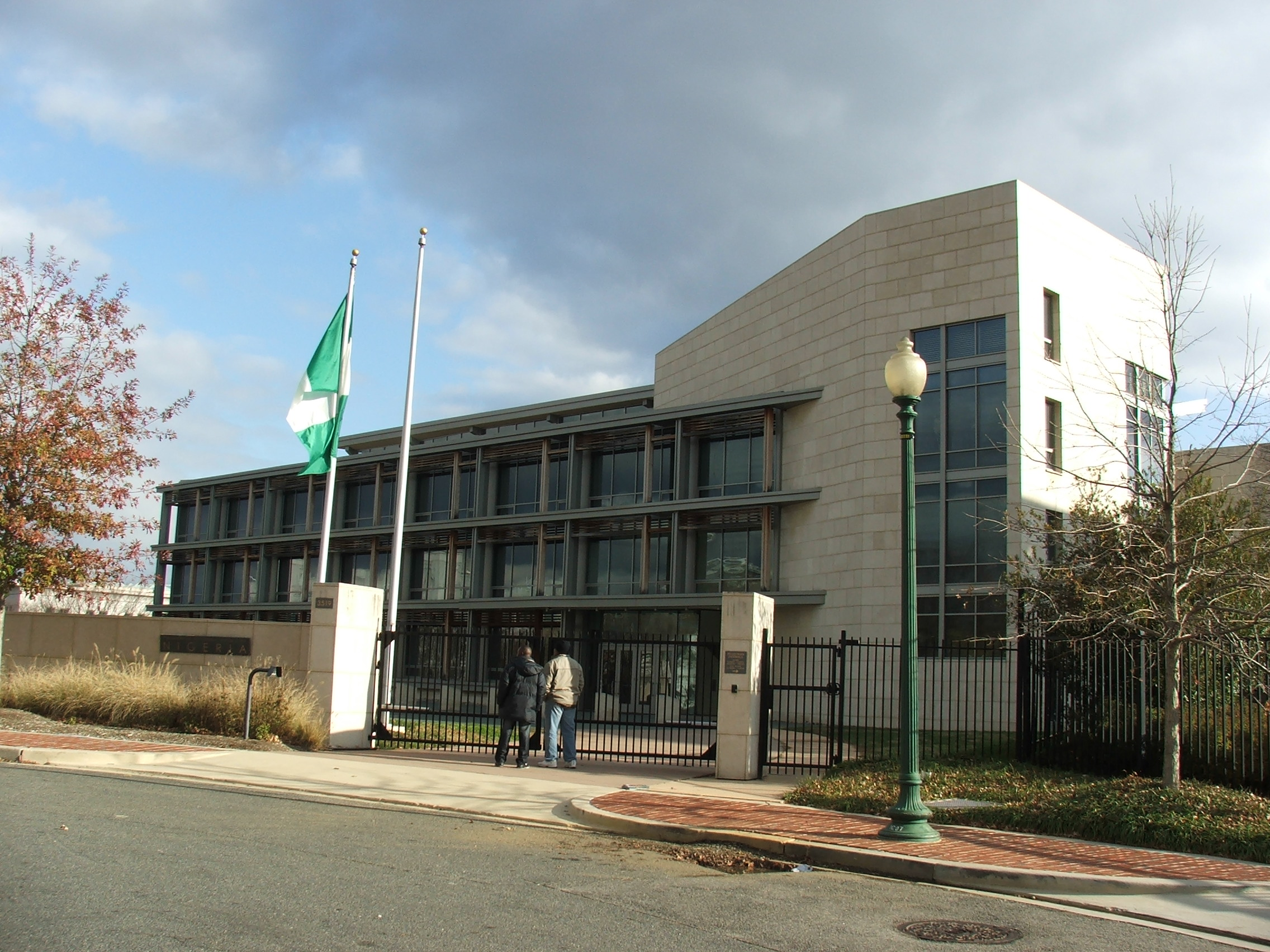
Embassy in Washington, D.C.

== Closed former missions ==
=== Americas ===
Host country	Host city	Mission	Year closed	Ref.
United States	San Francisco	Consulate-General	1989	

=== Asia ===
Host country	Host city	Mission	Year closed	Ref.
Bangladesh	Dhaka	High Commission (Note: Resident in New Delhi, India)	Unknown	
Iraq	Baghdad	Embassy (Note: Resident in Amman, Jordan)	Unknown	
Sri Lanka	Colombo	High Commission	2017	

=== Europe ===
Host country	Host city	Mission	Year closed	Ref.
Serbia and Montenegro	Belgrade	Embassy (Note: Resident in Budapest, Hungary)	2003	

== See also ==
- Foreign relations of Nigeria
- List of diplomatic missions in Nigeria
- Visa policy of Nigeria
