= Wahab Adekola Akande =

Nigerian diplomat

His Excellency, Ambassador Wahab Adekola Akande
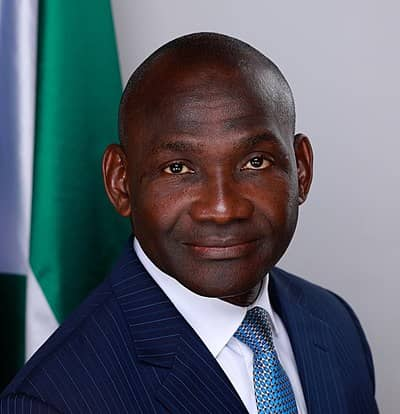
- Official portrait of Wahab Adekola Akande, Consul General, Consulate General of Nigeria, Frankfurt
- Born: 5 September 1967 (age 59); Lagos, Nigeria
- Occupation: Diplomat
- Years active: 1993 – date

Wahab Adekola Akande (born 5 September 1967) is a Nigerian diplomat known for his advocacy for cultural diplomacy, and a long-serving French Language Translator and Protocol Officer to several Nigerian presidents. He was Nigeria’s 6th Consul General at the Consulate General of Nigeria in Frankfurt, Germany, and now serves as Nigeria's Ambassador to the Swiss Confederation.

His leadership at the Nigeria Consulate General in Frankfurt is known to have brought about improvements in consular operations in the mission and other engagements, among which is the first-ever consulate-organized Nigeria cultural carnival.

== Early background ==
Wahab Adekola Akande had his secondary education at the Ede Muslim Grammar School in present-day Osun State from 1981 to 1986.

He proceeded to the University of Ibadan where he graduated from the Department of European Studies with a bachelor of arts degree in French, second class (upper division). Between 1991 and 1992, he served under the mandatory National Youth Service Corps (NYSC) in Jos, Plateau State, with his primary assignment at the University of Jos. He began his working career as a graduate assistant with the University of Jos, before joining the Federal Civil Service.

== Diplomatic career ==
Ambassador Wahab Akande joined the Nigeria Ministry of Foreign Affairs in January 1993 and served in several headquarters departments and Nigerian diplomatic missions abroad, including Lome, Togo; Yaounde, Cameroon; and Brussels, Belgium.

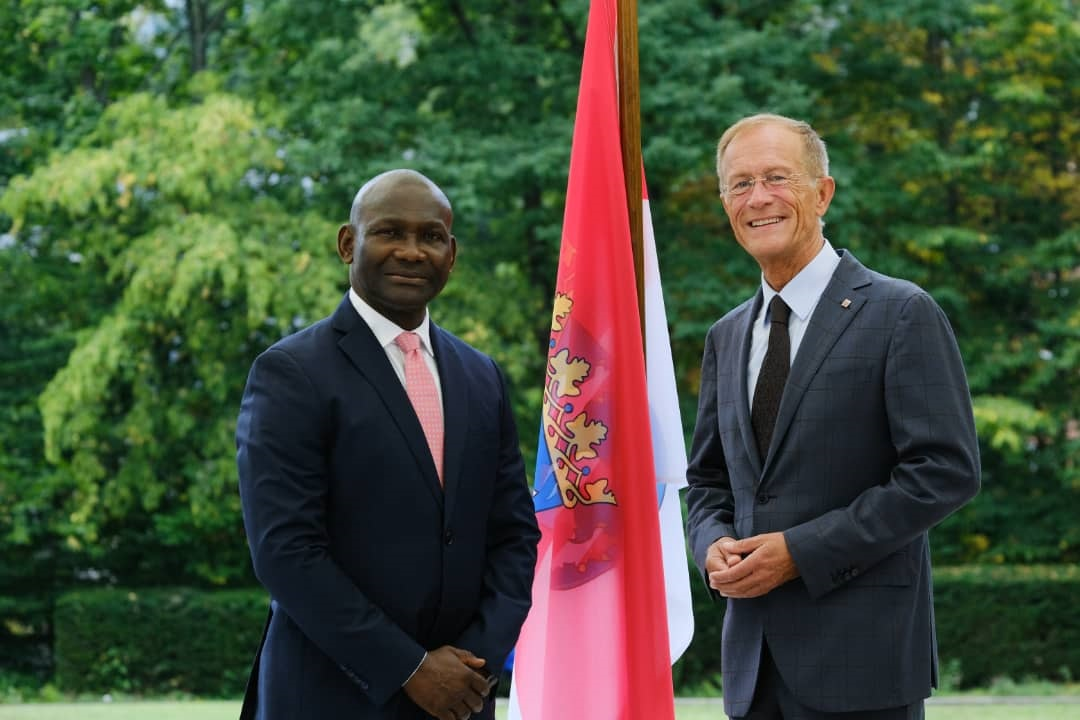
Axel Wintermeyer, Hessian Minister of State with Nigeria's CG in Frankfurt, Wahab Akande, during the latter's inaugural visit to the Hessian Chancellery

=== Tour of duty ===
In February 2007, Ambassador Akande was posted to the State House, Office of the President, where he served until 2011 as French language Interpreter/Protocol Officer to Presidents, Olusegun Obasanjo, Umaru Musa Yar'Adua and Goodluck Jonathan before his diplomatic posting to Brussels, Belgium.

On his return from Brussels, he was redeployed to the State House, Office of the President, to again serve as President Goodluck Jonathan's interpreter/protocol officer.

At the dawn of President Muhammadu Buhari's administration, he was deployed to the Office of the Vice President as Presidential Liaison Officer (PLO), where he served for six years.

In recognition of his decades of meritorious service to Nigeria, he was appointed Ambassador-in-situ on 18 December 2020.

On 11 January 2021, he was appointed Consul-General to the Consulate General of Nigeria in Frankfurt, Germany.
