= Yakubu Dadu =

Nigerian diplomat

His Excellency, Yakubu Audu Dadu
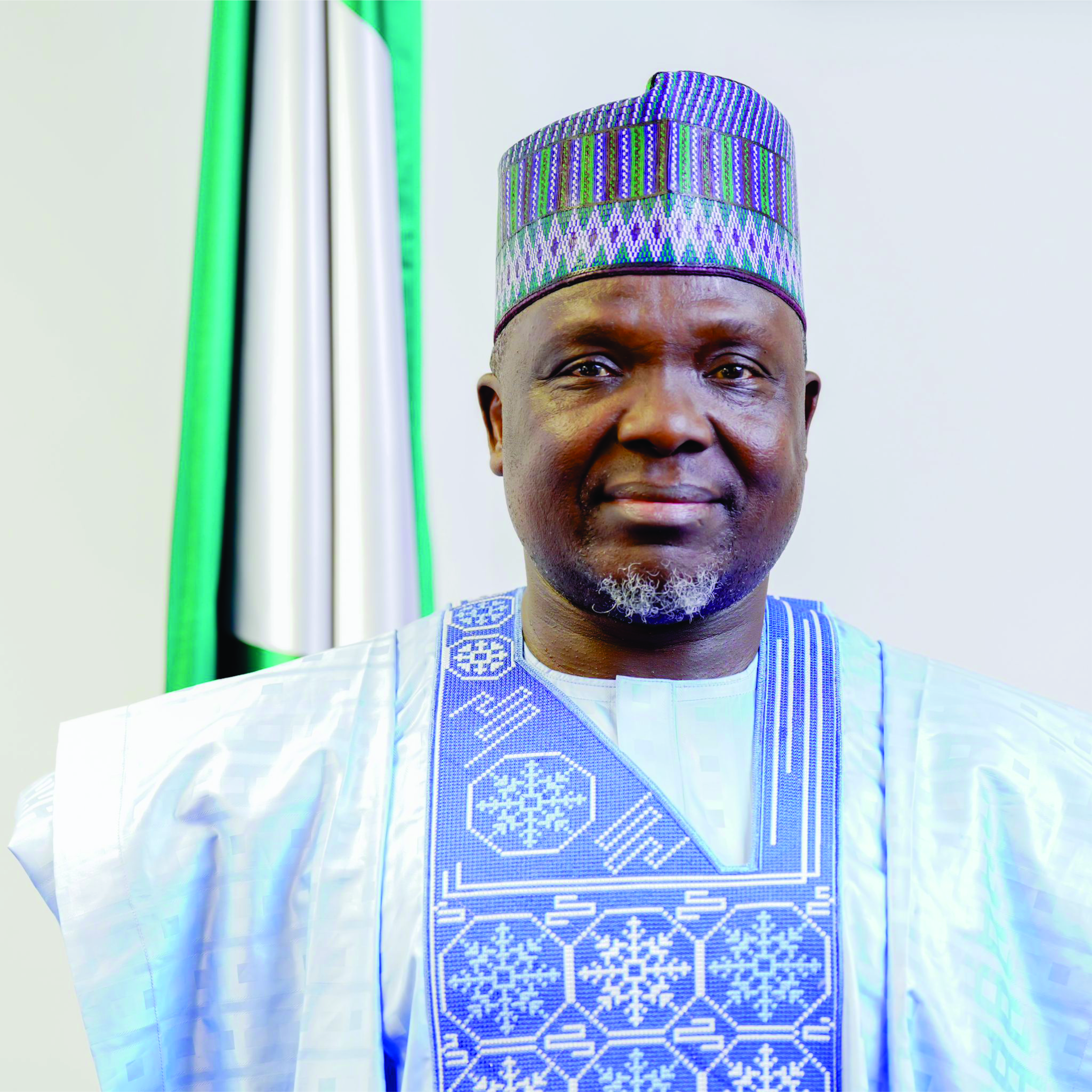
- Official portrait of Yakubu Audu Dadu, Consul General, Consulate General of Nigeria, Frankfurt
- Born: 3 November 1969 (age 57); Plateau, Nigeria
- Occupation: Diplomat
- Years active: 2001 – date

Ambassador Yakubu Audu Dadu (born 3 November 1969) is a long-serving Nigerian diplomat known for his advocacy for regional cooperation for the control of illicit proliferation of small arms and light weapons in the ECOWAS region. He is Nigeria’s 7th and current Consul General at the Consulate General of Nigeria in Frankfurt, Germany. He was appointed Nigeria’s ambassador by President Bola Ahmed Tinubu. In 2021, he successfully repatriated a stolen ancient Ile-Ife bronze head, which was seized at the Mexico City International Airport in Mexico City in 2017.

== Early life and education ==
Yakubu Dadu is from the Berom tribe and was born in Plateau State, Nigeria. He began his academic journey with a First School Leaving Certificate from LGED Primary School Bachi, Plateau State in 1982. He attended Government Teachers' College, Gindiri where he earned a Grade II Teachers’ Certificate in 1987. In 1991, he graduated the College of Education, Akwanga with a National Certificate in Education (NCE), and later earned a Bachelor of Science (BSc) in Political Science from the University of Abuja in 1997, where he graduated as the best student in International Relations. He furthered his education with a Master of Science (MSc) in International Relations and Strategic Studies from the University of Jos in 2004 and a PhD in International Relations and Diplomacy from the Centre d’Études Diplomatiques et Stratégiques, Paris, France, in 2014.

== Diplomatic career ==
Ambassador Dadu began his career in Nigeria's civil service during his compulsory National Youth Service (NYSC) as an Investigation Officer at the Public Complaints Commission in 1998. He joined the Ministry of Foreign Affairs in 2001 and served in various roles, both at home and abroad.

=== Tour of duty ===
Dadu's diplomatic tour of duty spans over two decades, during which he held several positions in foreign relations, policy management, and international cooperation. His journey began in February 2001 at the Ministry of Foreign Affairs, Abuja, where he served as Desk Officer in the Eastern Europe Division. In this role, he managed diplomatic relations between Nigeria and Eastern European countries, handling policy matters and coordinating bilateral meetings. By January 2003, he was appointed Desk Officer for Western Europe and Commonwealth Affairs at the Ministry, overseeing diplomatic engagements and policy matters related to these regions.

From 2006 to 2009, Ambassador Dadu was posted to the Embassy of Nigeria in Paris, where he handled consular and immigration matters, as well as political affairs. His tenure in Paris involved facilitating visa issuance, providing consular services, and representing Nigeria in diplomatic engagements with the French government.

Returning to Nigeria in 2009, Dadu took up the role of Desk Officer for Procurement and Capital Budget at the Ministry of Foreign Affairs. He was responsible for managing procurement processes and ensuring compliance with financial regulations in capital projects until March 2012. Concurrently, between January 2004 and December 2006, he also served as Desk Officer for Policy and Physical Planning in the Ministry’s Planning, Research, and Statistics Department, where he focused on developing policies related to national planning and development.

Between 2012 and 2014, Dadu became the Head/Desk Officer of the Fifth Committee at the Permanent Mission of Nigeria to the United Nations in New York and was redeployed to the Security Council Affairs in the Mission, and covered Burundi, the Democratic Republic of Congo, Ethiopia/Eritrea, Somalia, and Western Sahara among others.

In 2017, Dadu became Acting Head of the Second United Nations Division (SUND), a role he briefly held from July to September, after which he also headed the UN’s Fifth Committee Matters within the same division. He subsequently moved to the Directorate of Technical Aid Corps (DTAC), where he led the Research and Partnership Division from October 2017 to October 2018, focusing on South-South Cooperation and managing technical aid projects.

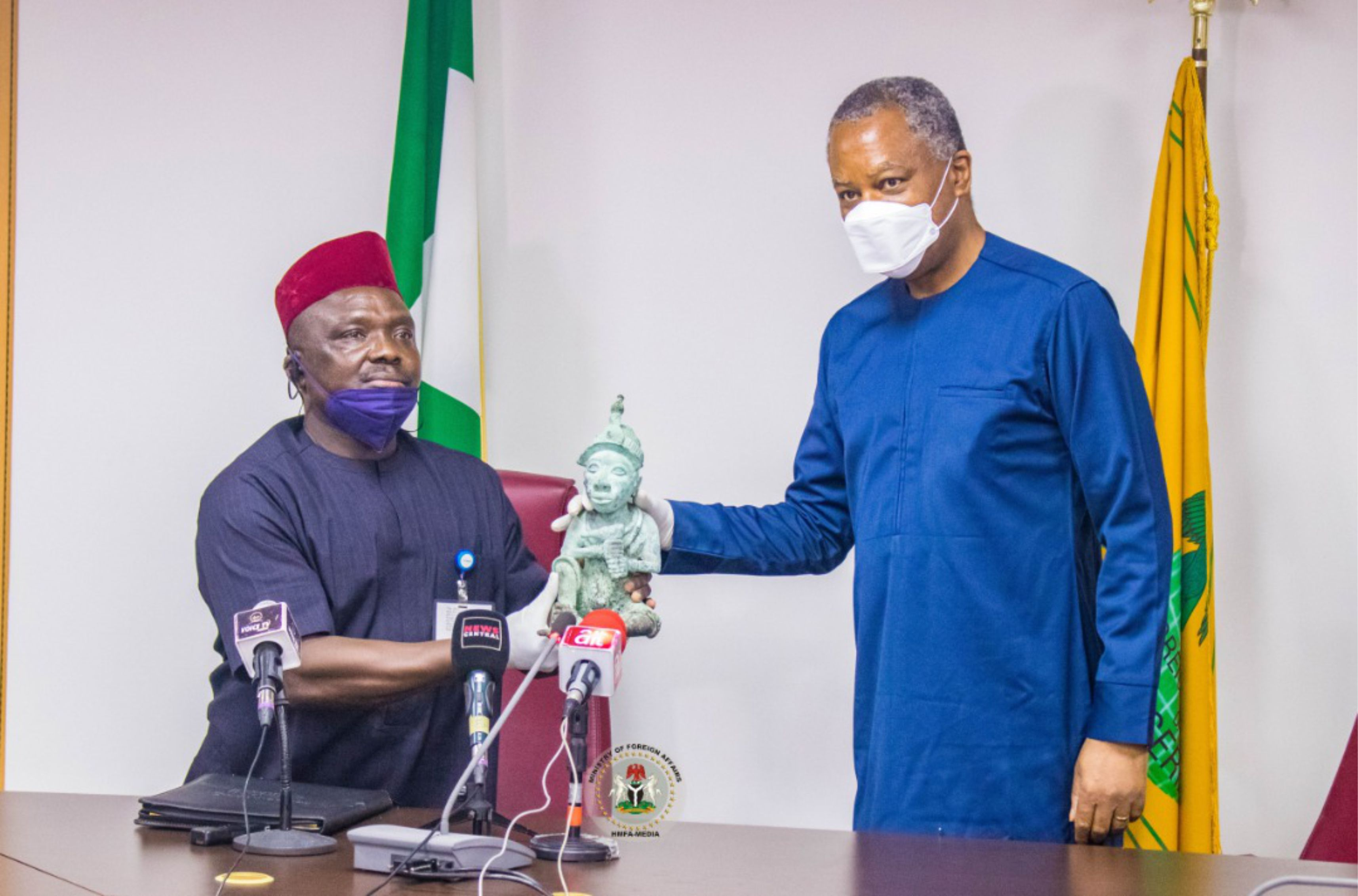
Dr. Yakubu Dadu presents stolen Ile-Ife artefact recovered from Mexico to Geoffrey Onyeama, Nigeria's Minister of Foreign Affairs

In October 2018, Dadu was posted to the Nigerian Embassy in Mexico City, where he served as Minister in charge of Administration, Political, and Economic Affairs. He later assumed the role of Charge d’Affaires (CDA) ad interim at the Embassy from October 2020 to June 2021, overseeing embassy operations and diplomatic relations with Mexico - the highpoint being his repatriation of a stolen ancient Ile-Ife bronze head in 2021 which was cited at the Mexico City International Airport in Mexico City by his predecessor, Ambassador Aminu Iyawa in 2017.

Returning to Nigeria in 2022, Dadu was appointed Head of the ECOWAS National Unit at the Ministry of Foreign Affairs, Abuja, managing Nigeria’s policies and initiatives related to the Economic Community of West African States (ECOWAS). He later became Chair of the ECOWAS Administration and Finance Committee (AFC) from July 2023 to April 2024, overseeing administrative and financial matters for the organization.

In April 2024, President Bola Ahmed Tinubu appointed Dadu Nigeria's ambassador and posting as Nigeria's Consul General in Frankfurt, Germany.

== Published works and research ==
Dadu has a notable academic presence, having published research on international security and small arms proliferation. His PhD dissertation focused on "Regional Cooperation for the Control of Illicit Proliferation of Small Arms and Light Weapons: The Case of ECOWAS." In 2015, he was a major contributor to a book on the UN Program of Action to combat the illicit trade of small arms titled, Anatomy of a Consensus (edited by Joy Ogwu) where he wrote extensively on "Implementing the Decisions of the 2nd Review Conference (2012) of the UN Programme of Action (PoA) to Prevent, Combat and Eradicate the Illicit Trade in Small Arms and Light Weapons in all its Aspects at the Regional Level: The Case of ECOWAS.

== Awards and commendations ==
During the 68th session of the United Nations General Assembly, Dadu received commendation from the Chairman of the Fifth Committee for his outstanding coordination of negotiations within the United Nations General Assembly Fifth Committee. In addition to his work at the UN, Dadu was also commended by the Government of Nigeria for his contributions as a member of Nigeria's team to the United Nations Security Council, 2014-2015.
