= German Chambers of Commerce Abroad =

The German Chambers of Commerce Abroad (AHKs; Auslandshandelskammern in German) represent the interests of their members in international markets. They operate in 93 countries at over 150 locations (as of 2024) and support companies with market entry, investment assistance, and bilateral trade promotion. AHKs function under the brand "DEinternational" and offer services such as market analysis, partner searches, visibility enhancement, and legal or administrative support. (e.g. the AHK USA).

== Structure ==
AHKs are institutions that serve as service providers and membership organizations. Their legal forms vary depending on local law, including:

- Bilateral Chambers of Commerce,
- Delegations of German Industry and Commerce,
- Representative Offices.

They are purely private, non-governmental and non-diplomatic entities.

The umbrella organisation of the AHKs is the Association of German Chambers of Industry and Commerce (DIHK), which coordinates and supports the German Chambers. Furthermore, cooperation with various German trade associations strengthens the link between German chambers of Commerce Abroad and business and markets.

AHKs can be best described as subsidized consulting companies.

== Roles ==
AHKs fulfill two main roles:

- Membership organizations, with over 48,000 corporate members globally;
- Service providers under the DEinternational brand, offering tailored services like market analysis, partner search, trade fair organization, legal and tax advice.

== Funding ==
AHKs are financed through service fees, membership contributions, and public funds. The Bundesministerium für Wirtschaft und Klimaschutz (BMWK). provides around €60 million annually in direct subsidies, with an additional €25 million in indirect support. However, they remain independent organizations and are neither part of Germany's diplomatic services nor a state agency.

== Cooperations ==
AHKs work closely with:

- The German Chambers of Industry and Commerce (IHKs),
- The Association of German Chambers of Commerce and Industry (DIHK),
- German embassies and consulates,
- Trade associations and trade fair organizations.
- German Trade and Invest

== Oversight and Criticism ==
The network has drawn criticism on several fronts:

- Transparency: The German Federal Audit Office has noted insufficient performance evaluation mechanisms and financial oversight, including unclear salary structures and inconsistent accounting practices.
- Executive compensation: Media reports highlighted a CEO salary of up to €400,000 at the London AHK, sparking debate about transparency and proportionality.
- Governance: In 2023, the Vice President of the AHK Greece resigned amid allegations of conflict of interest.
- Historical sensitivity: The AHK in São Paulo was criticized for honoring individuals linked to Brazil's military dictatorship.
- Alleged improper Use of Funds and Code of Conduct: Several political parties in the German parliament—including the Green Party (Die Grünen), the Left Party (Die Linke), and Alternative für Deutschland (AfD)—have submitted multiple inquiries concerning the appropriate use of public funds, adherence to codes of conduct, respect for the host countries and ethical standards within the AHK. These concerns have also attracted attention from both German and international news outlets, which have reported on alleged misconduct and raised critical questions.
- Possible Case of Title Misuse: Further parliamentary inquiries to the German federal government have addressed a potential case of Amtsanmaßung (unauthorized assumption of public office) at the AHK UAE (German-Emirati Joint Council for Industry and Commerce) in Dubai. In its response, the federal government confirmed that, according to the local registry in the UAE, the AHK is falsely listed as "Government Liaison Office," with the German federal government indicated as the owner. At the same time, the government clarified that the AHK is neither a government institution nor owned by the federal government.AfD-Fraktion deckt Eigentumsfehler bei AHK-Dubai aufWebsite of AHK UAE
- Formal Reprimand Against DIHK for Data Protection Violations: On August 4, 2025, the Federal Commissioner for Data Protection and Freedom of Information (BfDI) upheld a complaint against the DIHK (German Chamber of Commerce and Industry) for violating data protection laws. The DIHK failed to provide data and documents to a former employee as required by Article 15 of the GDPR and unlawfully deleted personal data, including payroll records, from the employee's email account. The BfDI formally reprimanded the DIHK under Article 58 of the GDPR.
- Criticism of the Mandate Claim: The German Chambers of Commerce Abroad sometimes present themselves as having a special mandate in the field of German foreign trade promotion. However, critics argue that this gives the misleading impression of a legally defined exclusive mandate. In fact, there is no legal basis granting AHKs exclusive responsibility for foreign trade or representation of German business interests abroad. The Foreign Trade and Payments Act (AWG) does not mention the AHKs, and no other law provides for such a mandate. In response to a formal inquiry directed to the Federal Ministry for Economic Affairs and Energy, the Ministry clarified that the German Chambers of Commerce Abroad (AHKs) are private entities and do not possess any statutory mandate to officially represent the German economy abroad nor are they a state agency or governmental. Furthermore, the Ministry emphasized that there is no legal basis, cooperation agreement, or formal mandate authorizing AHKs to act as the official representatives of Germany's economic interests in foreign countries.
- Further criticism concerns the blurred distinction between commercial activities and potential market distortions to the disadvantage of private-sector actors who do not receive public tax funds.

== See also ==
- Association of German Chambers of Industry and Commerce
- Business association
- Lobbying
- Non-governmental organization
- Trade group
- German American Chambers of Commerce
- Indo-German Chamber of Commerce
- German-Thai Chamber of Commerce
