= Consulate General of Nigeria, Frankfurt =

Consular representation of the Federal Republic of Nigeria in Germany

Consulate General of Nigeria in Frankfurt
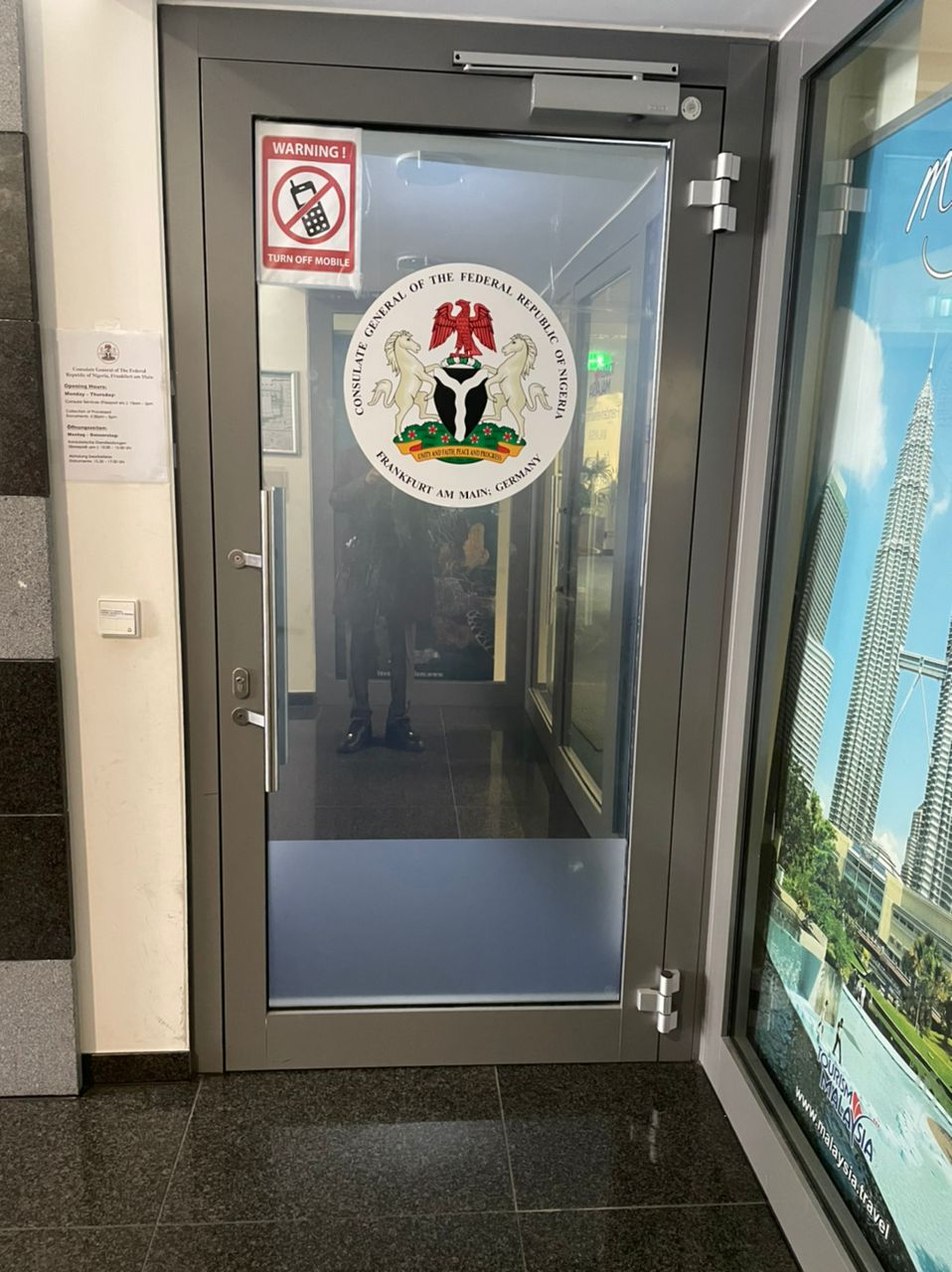
- Location: Frankfurt
- Address: Weissfrauenstrasse 12, D-60311, Frankfurt
- Coordinates: 50.109580°N 8.676160°E
- Consul General: Yakubu Dadu

The Consulate General of Nigeria, Frankfurt is a Nigerian diplomatic mission in Germany established in 2013. It is the first and only Nigerian Consulate Office in Europe. It is located at Weissfrauenstrasse 12, D-60311, Frankfurt, with jurisdiction comprising five states in the South of Germany. The consulate is currently headed by Ambassador Yakubu Dadu who is the Consul General.

== Nigerians in Frankfurt and environs ==
Nigerians are the largest sub-Saharan African group in Germany. According to a March 2017 data report from the Federal Bureau of Statistics, more than 56,000 Nigerians lived in Germany. However, it is generally assumed that there are more than 90,000 Nigerians in Germany. A large community of them are within the consular jurisdiction, which necessitated the opening of the Consulate General in Frankfurt.

Historically, the first Nigerians in Germany arrived on study visas - with scholarships from the German government in support of Nigeria's post-independence development efforts. The outbreak of the Nigerian Civil War subsequently witnessed some Nigerians seeking asylum in Germany. At the end of the war, migration for scholarship continued. German companies with projects in Nigeria also brought in some Nigerian for training in Germany in fulfilment of contract terms for technical knowledge transfer for such projects.

A large number of Nigerians in Germany are professionals: doctors, engineers, IT specialists, academics, entrepreneurs, students, etc. There are also normal workers in different sectors of the German economy. A lot of them live in the country on temporary residence status.

Most Nigerians reside in major cities and are easily reachable through places of worship, cultural/tribal associations and social groupings. Many are also organized in professional groups like Nigerian Scholars in Germany, Nigerian Medical Association, etc. There are umbrella associations like the Nigerians in Diaspora Organization in Germany and the Nigerian Community in Germany, which was formed in 1990 and incorporated in Bonn (1992). Both organizations have branches in Frankfurt.

== Consular Jurisdiction ==
The Consular Jurisdiction of the Nigeria Consulate in Frankfurt comprises five states in the South of Germany, namely; Hesse, the State Rhineland-Palatinate, Baden-Württemberg, the Free State of Bavaria, North Rhine-Westphalia. Major cities within the consular jurisdiction include Düsseldorf, Heidelberg, and Wiesbaden, Dortmund, Sindelfingen, Meinheim, among others.

== Consulate services ==
=== Consulate ===
The consulate is open for consular services from Monday to Thursday between 10:00 am to 3:00 pm for the processing of documents and 3:00 pm to 5:00 pm for the collection of documents. It provides four major services: passport services, visa services, emergency travel certificates and citizenship services. The mission also handles education, cultural, and diaspora matters.

In addition, the consulate provides help and assistance to Nigerians living within its area of jurisdiction. Such service may take the form of:

1. provision of replacement travel documents
2. advice and support in the case of an accident, serious illness, or death
3. advice and support to victims of serious crime overseas, and arranging for next-of-kin to be informed
4. visitation contact with incarcerated nationals
5. liaison with local police officials in the case of nationals abducted or missing overseas
6. assistance to distressed Nigerians
7. help during crises, such as civil unrest and natural disasters
8. registering citizen births abroad
9. provide a list of local doctors and lawyers for medical and/or legal issues
10. supervising their flag vessels in foreign harbours

=== Passport services ===
Passport application is done online. There is no walk-in service. Applicants for biometric enrollment submit their applications online through the Nigerian Immigration Service website, after payment of the requisite fee. Application for a passport takes 10 weeks.

=== Emergency Travel Certificate ===
Emergency Travel Certificate (ETC) is issued to stranded Nigerians overseas who lack the proper immigration status to return home. Only Nigerian citizens who lose their passports or who, due to unforeseeable circumstances, have exceeded their passport or visa expiration date are eligible for this consular service.

This certificate enables them a one-way trip back to Nigeria, after which the document must be returned to immigration officials at the point of entry.

Nigerians needing an ETC are required to send an application letter to the Consul General alongside a passport photograph, a copy of an expired or lost/stolen passport, a police report for a lost/stolen passport, self-addressed envelope with a stamp for return delivery. A designated fee is required.

In 2021, the Nigerian government launched a temporary passport to replace the Emergency Travel Certificate, with 30-day validity.

=== Citizenship services ===
The consulate also offers citizenship services which include age declaration, burial transit permits, change of profession, citizen identification and registration, and corporate registration.

== Consulate Officials ==
The current officials at the mission are:

1. Amb. Yakubu A. Dadu, PhD - Consul General
2. Abdulwaliu Adetoro Faro - Consul (Protocol/Education/Culture/Diaspora matters)
3. Mrs. Maimuna Almakura Alakayi - Consul (Economic/Trade/Investment matters)
4. Abhulimen Ogun - Consul (Head of Chancery/Info)
5. Kingsley R. Dein - Consul (Consular matters)
6. Mohammed Maina Liberty - Vice Consul (Immigration)
7. Demas Amase Gbadema - Vice Consul (Finance)
8. Mrs. Rabecca Umaru - Administration Attache

== Consuls General ==
The table shows a list of Consuls General that have served in the Consulate General from its inauguration in 2013 to date.

Consul General	Time in office
Amb. John Chukwuma Eziaghighala	Dec. 2013 - March 2015
Amb. John Chika Ejinaka	March 2015 - April 2017
Amb. D. Olu Falowo	April 2017 - July 2018
Amb. Suleiman Dauda Umar	Aug. 2018 - April 2021
Amb. Wahab Adekola Akande	June 2021 - May 2024
Amb. Yakubu A. Dadu, PhD	July 2024 - present

== Consular holidays ==
The consulate observes all public holidays within the consular jurisdiction areas as well as all national public holidays in Germany and Nigeria, which includes Christian and Muslim holidays. The mission is not open to the public these days

Holiday	Date
New Year's Day	January 1
Good Friday	Moveable
Easter Monday	Moveable
Labour Day	May 1
Id el Fitri	Moveable
Ascension Day	39 days after Easter
Whit Monday	50 days after Easter
Democracy Day	June 12
Corpus Christi	60 days after Easter
Id el Kabir	Moveable
Independence Day (Nigeria)	October 1
Id el Maulud	Moveable
German Unity Day	October 3
Christmas Day	December 25
2nd Day of Christmas/Boxing Day	December 26

== See also ==
- Germany–Nigeria relations
- Foreign relations of Nigeria
- Foreign relations of Germany
