= Germany Trade and Invest =

Germany Trade and Invest mbH
- Company type: State-owned enterprise (GmbH)
- Founded: 2009
- Headquarters: Berlin, Germany
- Key people: Julia Braune and Robert Hermann
- Number of employees: 400
- Website: www.gtai.de

Germany Trade and Invest - Gesellschaft für Außenwirtschaft und Standortmarketing mbH (GTAI), the successor to the German Office for Foreign Trade (bfai) since January 1, 2009, is a limited liability company (GmbH) wholly owned by the federal government of Germany; it is assigned to the Federal Ministry for Economic Affairs and Energy. The company currently has over 400 employees, including over 80 abroad. Important partners of the organization are the Chamber of Commerce and Industry, the KfW, the Deutsche Gesellschaft für Internationale Zusammenarbeit and the federal government and its ministries.

== History ==
The company was founded in 1951 as the Bundesauskunftsstelle für den Außenhandel (Federal Foreign Trade Information Office, BfA) and renamed in 1953 as the Bundesstelle für Außenhandelsinformation (Federal Foreign Trade Information Office) with headquarters in Cologne. In 1960, the Gesellschaft für Außenhandelsinformationen mbH (GfAI) was founded as a subsidiary of the Federal Agency for Foreign Trade Information. All foreign correspondents reporting for the BfA were henceforth employed by this company.

In 2001 the Federal Agency for Foreign Trade Information (BfAI) was renamed to the Federal Agency for Foreign Trade (Bundesagentur für Außenwirtschaft, BfAI). In 2003, the Gesellschaft zur Unterstützung des Beauftragten für Auslandsinvestitionen mbH was renamed Invest in Germany GmbH. Invest in Germany was the official location marketing agency for foreign investments, while the Federal Agency for Foreign Trade promoted exports. On January 1, 2009, a new economic development agency was created by merging the Federal Agency for Foreign Trade (bfai), the Society for Foreign Trade Information (Gesellschaft für Außenhandelsinformationen, GfAI) and Invest in Germany GmbH into Germany Trade and Invest.

== Mission ==
The GTAI conducts marketing for Germany as a business location. It also recruits investors and provides foreign trade information for companies based in Germany. Its headquarters are in Berlin, and there is also a branch office in Bonn.

The information provided by the organization ranges from a description of the economic situation and developments worldwide to industry trends, legal and customs regulations. Information on investment and development projects is also provided. Companies receive information on tenders and business and cooperation requests from potential foreign partners. Information is obtained via a network of correspondents deployed worldwide at more than 50 locations, as well as country, legal, tax and customs experts at the Bonn site.

The information is distributed mainly free of charge via the Internet, e-mail services, brochures and magazines. The company also manages the foreign trade portal iXPOS.

== See also ==
- State-owned enterprises of Germany

== Literature ==
- Winfried Kasulke: Die Bundesstelle für Außenhandelsinformation. Boldt Verlag, Bonn 1971, ISBN 3-87086-037-5.
- Wolfgang Ramsteck: Strukturreformen der deutschen und britischen Außenwirtschaftsförderung in Zeiten der Globalisierung: Die Rolle staatlicher und gesellschaftlicher Einflussfaktoren. In: Außenwirtschaft. Vol. 64, Nr. 3, 2009, S. 223–251.
- Marc Lehnfeld, Dr. Robert Hermann, Dr. Hans-Peter Hüssen: Germany Trade & Invest – moderne Wirtschaftsförderung im internationalen Wettbewerb. In: Erfolgreiche Wirtschaftsförderung. Erich Schmidt Verlag, Berlin 2015, ISBN 978-3-503-16505-6.
