= Association of German Chambers of Industry and Commerce =

German organization

- Founded: c. 1872
- Type: Public Body, Advocacy group
- Purpose: Business advocacy
- Location: Berlin, Germany
- Region served: Germany
- Method: Trade promotion political lobbying
- Key people: Hans Heinrich Driftmann, President of DIHK; Martin Wansleben, Chief Executive of the DIHK
- Website: https://www.dihk.de/en

Association of German Chambers of Industry and Commerce (German: Deutsche Industrie- und Handelskammer, DIHK) is a German 'chamber,' similar to an English guild but is required under German law and provides political influence of a trade union. This organization was formerly known as the Deutscher Industrie- und Handelstag or DIHT.

Following a series of legal proceedings in several instances due to inadmissible communications by the DIHK because it had exceeded the limits of its authority, these limits of authority were specified in the amendment to the Chamber of Industry and Commerce Act. As of 1 January 2023, the Association of German Chambers of Industry and Commerce e. V. was transformed into the German Chamber of Industry and Commerce (DIHK) on January 1, 2023. This changes the legal form: the DIHK is transformed from a registered association organized under private law into a body under public law. The chambers of industry and commerce are legal members of the DIHK.

== Structure ==
In Germany, 'Chambers of Commerce and Industry' is an organization for 79 'chambers' who represents companies within the German state. The DIHK provides over 'three million entrepreneurs' or association members, representing small kiosks and shops to larger commercial companies, with political influence. DIHK has its headquarters in Berlin, a major office in Brussels and representative offices throughout Europe.

Association members are under German Chamber of Commerce compulsory or public law model, enterprises of certain sizes, types, or sectors are obliged to become members of the chamber. This model is common in European Union countries (France, Germany, Italy, Spain), but also in Japan. Main tasks of the chambers are foreign trade promotion, vocational training, regional economic development, and general services to their members. The chambers were given responsibilities of public administration in various fields by the state which they exercise in order management. The chambers also have a consultative function; this means the chambers must be consulted whenever a new law related to industry or commerce is proposed.

In Germany, for over 150 years, the chambers of commerce and industry (IHK – Industrie- und Handelskammer) and the chambers of skilled crafts (HwK – Handwerkskammer) are public statutory bodies with self-administration under the inspectorate of the state ministry of economy. Enterprises are members by law according to the chamber act (IHK-Gesetz) of 1956. Because of this, such chambers are much bigger than chambers under private law. IHK Munich, the biggest German chamber of commerce, has 350,000 member companies. Germany also has compulsory chambers for "free occupations" such as architects, dentists, engineers, lawyers, notaries, physicians and pharmacists. Exceptions are skilled craftsmen, freelancers and agricultural businesses.

== Members ==
=== Inside of Germany ===
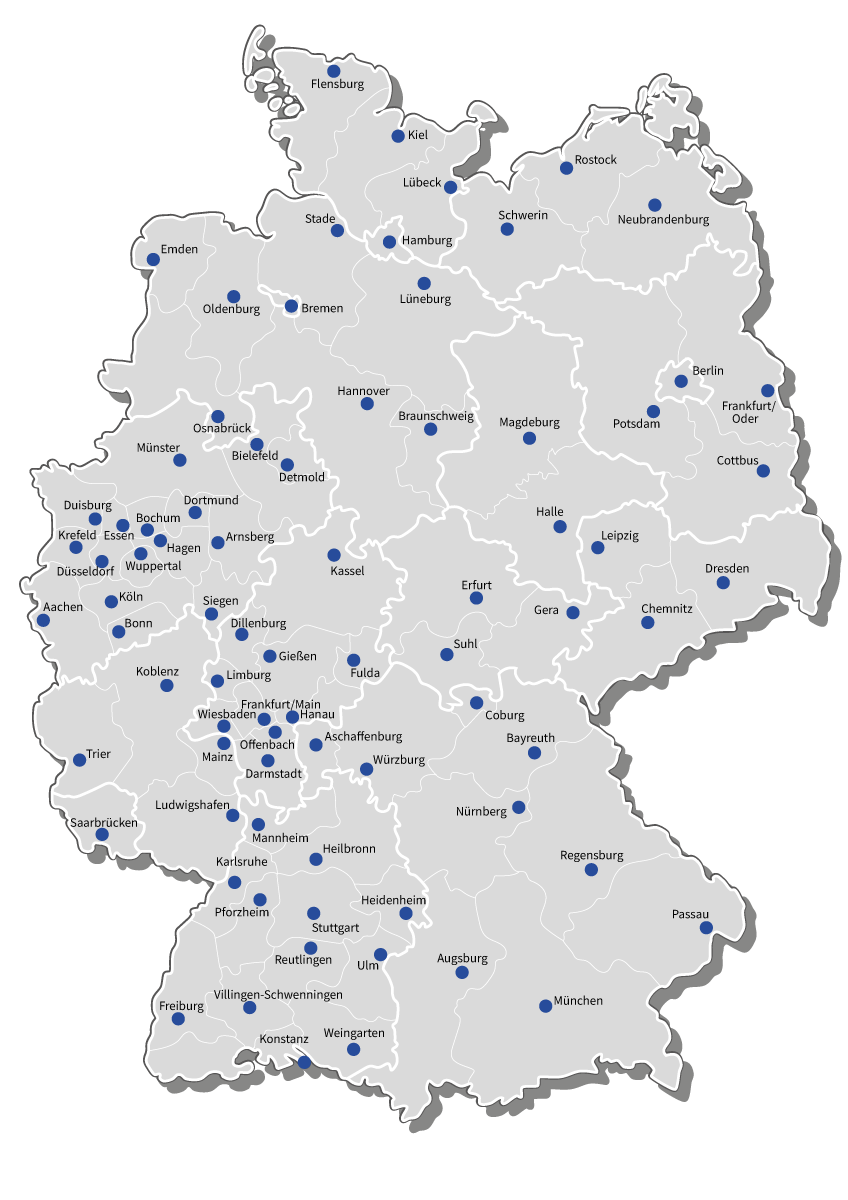
Map of all members

Inside of Germany, the IHKs are split in 79 regional zones.

Bundesland	Number of IHKs
Baden-Wurttemberg	12
Bavaria	9
Berlin	1
Brandenburg	3
Bremen	1
Hamburg	1
Hesse	10
Mecklenburg-Vorpommern	3
Lower Saxony: IHK Osnabrück – Emsland – Grafschaft Bentheim	7
North Rhine-Westphalia: IHK Arnsberg	16
Rhineland Palatinate	4
Saarland	1
Saxony	3
Saxony-Anhalt	2
Schleswig-Holstein	3
Thuringia	3
Total	79

=== Outside of Germany ===
==== AHK ====
Logo of AHK USA

German American Chambers of Commerce is a bilateral trade organization promoting German and German-American businesses within the United States and worldwide in 90 countries and 130 locations. The AHKs throughout the world are under the 'DEinternational ' brand name.

The GACCs represent about 2,500 members in the United States under the abbreviation AHK USA. In German this is; Deutsch-Amerikanische Handelskammer or AHK. It has offices in Atlanta, Chicago, New York City, Philadelphia and San Francisco with a liaison office to the Representative of German Industry and Trade in Washington D.C.

The GACC Consulting Services Department's goal is to assist and support German companies with USA market entry and expansion. They do this by providing "events, such as networking receptions, economic forums, members only events, Industry specific conferences, business luncheons, seminars" including lobbying the American government agencies. They also provide companies with market analysis, marketing concepts, legal and tax assistance, business representation, and Trade show support.

The GACC publishes various articles, journals and reports. These include, but are not limited to:

- Subsidiaries of German Firms in the U.S. – Over 3,500 firms in the U.S., which are owned 50% or more by a German firm.
- National GACC Membership Directory – About 2,500 companies in the US. It also contains contact information for the parent German organization.
- U.S.-German Economic Yearbook – An annual report which provides an "in-depth view of US-German politics, economics and finance."
- German American Trade Quarterly – This quarterly magazine provides an inlook into "German-American economic, corporate, political, and trade fair news ..."
- Visa and Work Permits for the USA – Regarding US laws for German workers.
- Understanding German and American Business Cultures – A managerial guide to US and German business practices and differences.

==== AHK Malaysia ====
AHK Malaysia or locally known as the Malaysian-German Chamber of Commerce and Industry (MGCC) is the official representative of German companies within Malaysia and worldwide, together with the German diplomatic representations.

MGCC represents its members throughout Malaysia under the abbreviation AHK Malaysia/MGCC with its main office located in Kuala Lumpur. Among the services rendered by the chamber includes, but not limited to, Market Entry into the country, Corporate and Accounting Services, German Business Centre, Conferences and Projects and Trade Fairs support and representations.

MGCC also publishes articles, journals and reports primarily in regards to the Malaysian industry such as the Malaysian Rubber Glove Industry.

== See also ==
- Business association
- Lobbying
- Non-governmental organization
- Trade group
- Trade union
- United States Chamber of Commerce
