= List of international presidential trips made by Muhammadu Buhari =

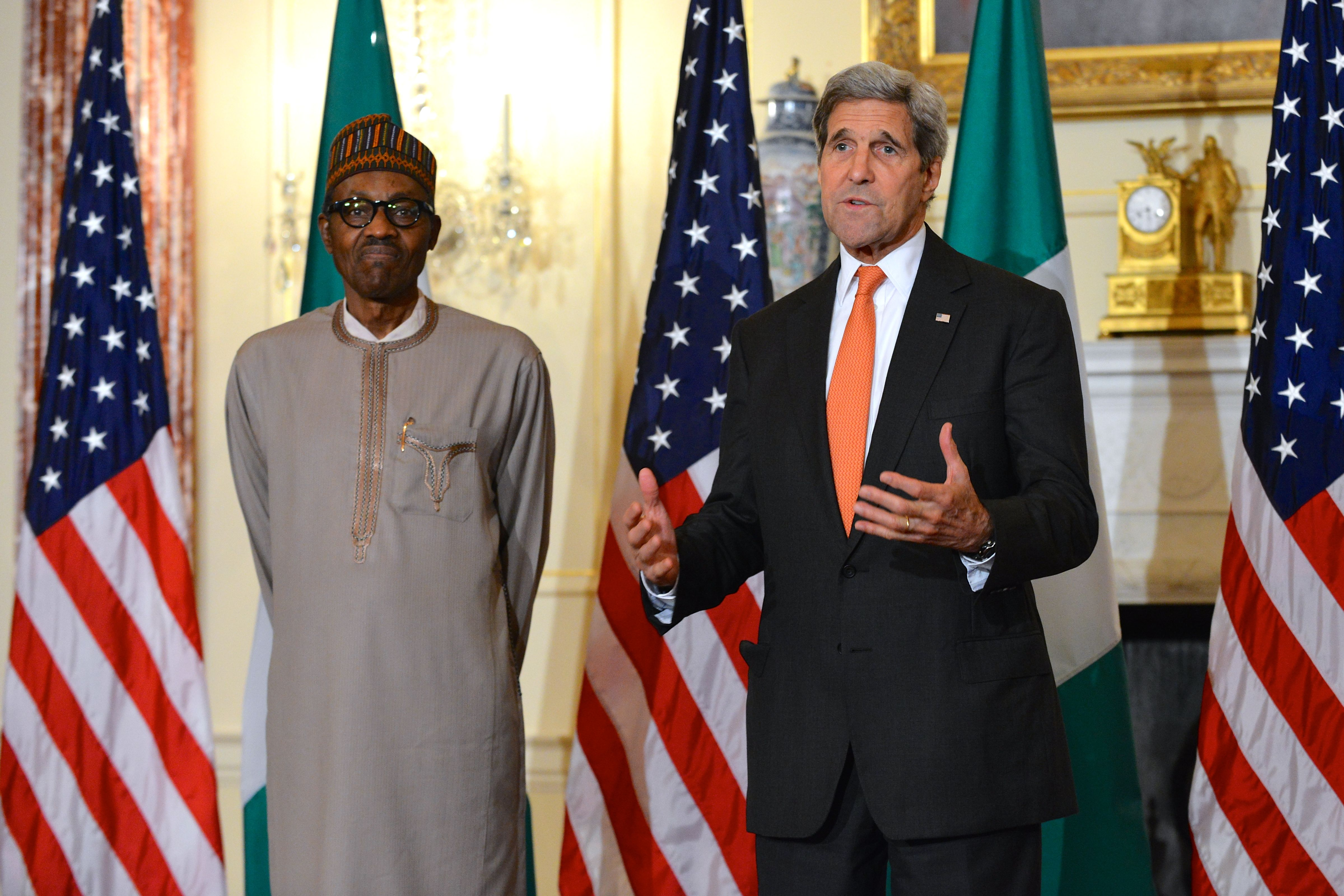
Muhammadu Buhari giving talk before Working Lunch with Secretary Kerry

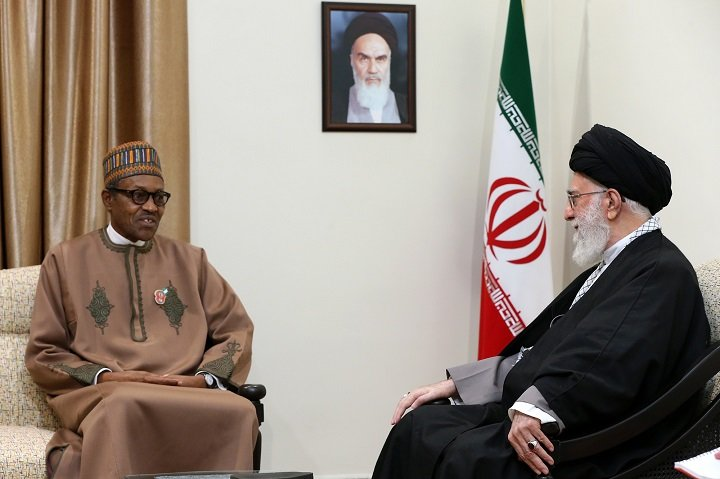
Muhammadu Buhari at the house of Ali Khameni in Tehran

Muhammadu Buhari became President following the 2015 Nigerian general election. The following is a list of international presidential trips made by Muhammadu Buhari as the 15th President of Nigeria.

President Muhammadu Buhari has travelled out of Nigeria a total of 51 times since assuming office in 2015.

== Summary of international trips ==
Here is a summary of the countries President Muhammadu Buhari of Nigeria has visited as President. There are two trips that he made to the United Kingdom, one on his official vacation and one for medical treatment that are included in this list.

Map showing International trips made by Buhari as President 1 Visit 2 Visits 3 Visits 4 Visits 5+ Visits Nigeria

Number of visits	Country
1 visit	Belgium, Burkina Faso, Cameroon, Egypt, Guinea-Bissau, India, Iran, Japan, Liberia, Mali, Malta, Mauritania, Netherlands, Russia, Rwanda, Poland, Portugal, South Korea, Spain, Sudan, Togo, Turkey
2 visits	Benin, China, Côte d'Ivoire, Equatorial Guinea, Germany, Jordan, Morocco, Qatar
3 visits	Chad, Ghana, Kenya, Niger, South Africa, The Gambia, United Arab Emirates
4 visits	Senegal
5(+) visits	Ethiopia (6), France (5), Saudi Arabia (5), United Kingdom (5), United States (11)

== 2015 ==
The following is a list of international presidential trips made by Buhari in 2015.

Country	Areas visited	Date(s)	Purpose(s)	Notes
Niger	Niamey	3 June	Anti-Boko Haram summit	See also: Boko Haram insurgency Buhari travels to Niamey along with presidents of Cameroon to discuss the operation against the insurgency created by the Boko Haram in the Lake Chad region. Nigeria committed to relocate their military command centre to Maiduguri and further support the rebuilding of the infrastructure in Borno State.
Chad	N'Djamena	4 June	State Visit	See also: Boko Haram insurgency After the summit in Niger, Buhari makes a one-day visit to Chad to further discuss with Idriss Déby regarding the Boko Haram counter insurgency plan. Buhari is directly welcomed by Idriss Deby at N'Djamena International Airport.
Germany	Munich	7 – 8 June	42nd G7 summit	See also: Group of Eight Buhari presented his "wishlist" to the G7 members, in help to combat terrorism in Nigeria and in help to revive the Nigerian economy. Buhari met Angela Merkel, French president François Hollande, Canadian prime minister Stephen Harper, Japanese prime minister Shinzō Abe and World Bank President Jim Yong Kim at the sidelines of the summit.
South Africa	Johannesburg	12 – 13 June	25th African Union Summit	See also: African Union Buhari attends the 25th African Union Summit on Security. Terrorism was a key discussion topic and Buhari held a number of bilateral talks with various heads of state on the sidelines.
United States	Washington, D.C.	19 – 23 July	State Visit	Buhari held talks with various high level US officials and on 20 July had a private meeting with Barack Obama. Buhari sought US help in the combat against terrorism in Nigeria and asked for further military assistance in terms of technology and intelligence.
Cameroon	Yaoundé	29 – 30 July	State Visit	See also: African Union Buhari's visit was focused on the continued fight against Boko Haram in the Lake Chad region and Buhari discusses strategies with Cameroon president Paul Biya. Cameroon also raises the issue that the Cameroonian Military did not enjoy the freedom to enter Nigeria soil to fight the insurgency; while both Niger and Chad did.
Benin	Cotonou	2 – 3 August	Independence Celebrations	Buhari attended Benin's 55 years of independence celebration. He also held talks with Thomas Boni Yayi with regards to the Boko Haram insurgency after Benin increased the number of troops in its task force against the terrorist group.
Ghana	Accra	7 September	State Visit	Buhari makes a one-day official visit to hold bilateral talks with president of Ghana John Dramani Mahama. Buhari tries to discuss the repatriation of Nigerian funds, that allegedly the previous administration had stolen and stashed in Ghana. Further trade and regional security were also discussed.
France	Paris	14 – 16 September	State Visit	Buhari's main agenda for the visit was to increase bilateral trade and seek closer ties against the fight against terrorism in Nigeria. Buhari met with François Hollande with regards to oil and defence in Nigeria.
United States	New York City	24 – 29 September	70th session of the United Nations General Assembly	Buhari makes his first visit to the UN headquarters in New York. He holds various bilateral talks with Barack Obama, François Hollande and other high level leaders. Buhari also attended the World Leaders summit on violent extremism.
India	New Delhi	26 – 30 October	Third India Africa Forum Summit	See also: India–Nigeria relations Buhari attends the Third India Africa Forum summit hosted by Narendra Modi. It was the biggest India-Africa summit ever with representatives from all 54 African countries.
Sudan	Khartoum	30 October	State Visit	On the way back from the India-Africa forum, Buhari makes quick stop in Khartoum. Buhari held bilateral talks.
Iran	Tehran	22 – 24 November	3rd Gas Exporting Countries Forum	Buhari makes a 2-day state visit to attend the 3rd Gas Exporting Countries Forum. Buhari meets Nigerians living in Iran and had a private meeting with Ali Khamenei.
Malta	Valletta	28 – 30 November	2015 Commonwealth Heads of Government summit.	Buhari attends the 2015 Commonwealth Heads of Government Summit along with various other heads of state.
France	Paris	30 November – 1 December	Paris Conference of Parties 21	Buhari attends the Paris Conference on Climate change right after his visit to Malta. Buhari also gives a speech at the conference and promises that Nigeria will cut 20% of its emissions as part of the carbon reduction effort.
South Africa	Johannesburg	4 – 5 December	China Africa summit	See also: China–Nigeria relations Buhari attends the China-Africa Corporation Forum. While in South Africa Buhari discussed with Jacob Zuma regarding the MTN $5.2 billion fine and held talks to strengthen bilateral relationships.

== 2016 ==
The following is a list of international presidential trips made by Buhari in 2016. Buhari makes a trip to the United Kingdom in February 2016 & June 2016, however, they were not in an official capacity and were for routine medical checkups.

Country	Areas visited	Date(s)	Purpose(s)	Notes
Benin	Cotonou	8 January	11th summit of the Heads of State of the Niger Basin Authority	See also: Niger Basin Authority Buhari attends the 11th summit of the Heads of State of the Niger Basin Authority. The summit focused on the water resources in the area and the new secretary general is elected.
United Arab Emirates	Abu Dhabi	17 – 20 January	World Future Energy Summit	Buhari attends the World Future Energy Summit. Various agreements were also signed with the UAE government, in terms of Trade and share intelligence against terrorism.
Ethiopia	Addis Ababa	26 January	26th Summit of African Union Heads of State and Government.	Buhari attends the 26th Summit of African Union Heads of State and Government. The Summit focused on Peace and Security, which has been part of Buhari's main foreign policy agenda.
Kenya	Eldoret, Nairobi	27 – 29 January	State Visit	See also: Kenya–Nigeria relations Buhari arrived at Eldoret International Airport first, to join Uhuru Kenyatta president of Kenya and Hassan Sheikh Mohamud president of Somalia in the memorial service for Kenya Defence Forces soldiers that died in Somalia due to the Al-Shabaab insurgency. This is Buhari's first visit to East Africa and various trade agreements are drafted to promote intra-Africa trade which is the agenda of the Kenyan president. Furthermore, the laws in banking and taxation were reviewed.
France	Strasbourg	2 – 4 February	Official Visit	Buhari address the special session of the European Union Parliament with regards to the global fight against terrorism, extremism and corruption.
Egypt	Sharm El Sheikh	18 February	Sharm el-Sheikh 'Africa 2016’	Buhari attends the Sharm El Sheikh conference that attracted over 1200 delegates. The conference aimed to build relationships between North Africa and Sub-Saharan Africa. Buhari's main focus during the summit was focused on eliminating terrorism to improve the investment atmosphere. Buhari also held bilateral talks with Abdel Fattah el-Sisi, president of Egypt with regards to military and economic co-operation.
Saudi Arabia	Riyadh, Jeddah, Mecca, Medina	22 – 27 February	State Visit	Buhari was received by high level Saudi officials at the airport. Buhari was in Saudi Arabia to encourage Saudi investment into Nigeria and discuss trade agreements between the countries in terms of Oil and Shipping. Buhari meets the Saudi monarch, King Salman bin Abdulaziz al-Saud. Buhari also visits the two holy Islamic sites of Mecca and Medina.
Qatar	Doha	27 – 28 February	OPEC Meeting	See also: Organization of Petroleum Exporting Countries Buhari visit Qatar for the OPEC meeting. Buhari also meets the Emir of Qatar, Sheikh Tamim bin Hamad Al Thani to discuss the recent oil price glut. Buhari stresses the co-operation needed between OPEC and non-OPEC members to sustain oil producing countries economies.
Equatorial Guinea	Malabo	14 March	State Visit	Buhari visit's Malabo to discuss with president Teodoro Obiang Nguema Mbasogo with regards to maritime security in the Niger Delta. The countries want to establish a joint task force to combat piracy and oil theft in the Gulf of Guinea.
United States	Washington, D.C.	30 March – 3 April	4th Nuclear Security Summit	Buhari attends the 4th Nuclear Security Summit.
China	Beijing	11 – 14 April	State Visit	Buhari and his team of Nigerian delegates discussed various deals and agreements totalling over $6 billion. Various Nigerian and Chinese firms through the Nigeria-China business forum created bilateral agreements.
United Kingdom	London	13 May – 15 May	Anti-Corruption Summit	Buhari attends the first ever Anti-corruption summit in the United Kingdom. The summit attracted various heads of state from around Africa. Anti-corruption and terrorism have been the heart of the administrations agenda and the summit was vital to get international support.
Chad	N'Djamena	8 August	Inauguration of Idris Deby	See also: 2016 Chadian presidential election The President attended the Inauguration of Idris Deby along with various heads of state.
Kenya	Nairobi	27 – 28 August	Tokyo Conference on Africa	President Buhari attends the Sixth Tokyo International Conference on African Development. The conference promoted structural economic transformation through diversification and industrialisation.
United States	New York City	11 – 15 September	Seventy-first session of the United Nations General Assembly	President Buhari attends the Seventy-first session of the United Nations General Assembly.
Germany	Berlin	13 – 16 October	State Visit	Buhari attends the Nigerian business forum in Germany and tries to increase economic ties between Germany and Nigeria. Buhari also held bilateral talks with Angela Merkel to increase economic and military ties between the country. Buhari made the official announcement that 21 Chibok girls were released and that the government was further negotiating the remaining girls release.
Morocco	Marrakesh	14 – 18 November	United Nations Climate Change conference	Buhari attended the COP22 conference on climate change in Morocco.
Senegal	Dakar	5 – 7 December	Third Dakar International Forum on Peace and Security in Africa	Buhari attended the Third Dakar International Forum on peace and Security in Africa. Along with various other leaders. Buhari also met some Nigerian diaspora based in Senegal.
The Gambia	Banjul	13 December	ECOWAS summit	See also: 2016 Gambian presidential election Buhari along with two other heads of state, Ellen Johnson Sirleaf and John Dramani Mahama, flew into Banjul to persuade Yahya Jammeh to follow the constitution and accept defeat in the country's election. The Economic Community of West African States leaders also met with Adama Barrow to discuss international involvement in the presidential transfer process.

== 2017 ==
The following is a list of international presidential trips made by Buhari in 2017. In January, May and September 2017, Buhari traveled to the United Kingdom, however, they were not in an official capacity and were for routine medical checkups.

Country	Areas visited	Date(s)	Purpose(s)	Notes
Ghana	Accra	7 January	Inauguration of Nana Akufo-Addo	See also: 2016 Ghanaian general election Buhari attends the inauguration of Nana Akufo-Addo.
The Gambia	Banjul	13 January	ECOWAS mediation meeting	See also: 2016–17 Gambian constitutional crisis Buhari attends the mediation meeting along with other Economic Community of West African States leaders such as Macky Sall. The meeting was to help find a solution to the constitutional crisis left by Yahya Jammeh following the country's election. President elect Adama Barrow left with president Buhari and is to be escorted by West African leaders when his tenure begins.
Mali	Bamako	13 – 14 January	27th Africa France Summit	Buhari attends the 27th Africa France Summit along with various other African leaders. The trip is made after the president makes a quick stop in The Gambia.
United States	New York City	17 – 20 September	Seventy-second session of the United Nations General Assembly	President Buhari attends the Seventy-second session of the United Nations General Assembly.
Turkey	Ankara, Istanbul	18 – 22 October	State Visit	See also: Nigeria–Turkey relations Buhari makes a 4 day state visit to Turkey to discuss bilateral issues with his counterpart Recep Erdoğan. Various issues with regards to security, aid and infrastructure were discussed. After the trip to Ankara, president Buhari attends the ninth D-8 Summit in Istanbul.
Côte d'Ivoire	Abidjan	28 – 30 November	5th EU-AU summit	President Buhari attends the Fifth AU-EU Summit.
Jordan	Amman	1 – 4 December	Summit	President Buhari and King Abdullah II of Jordan co-host the counter-terrorism summit. Both leaders agreed to strengthen counter-terrorism commitments between the two nations to help reduce violent extremism in West Africa.

== 2018 ==
The following is a list of international presidential trips made by Buhari in 2018.

Country	Areas visited	Date(s)	Purpose(s)	Notes
Ethiopia	Addis Ababa	28 – 30 January	30th Summit of African Union Heads of State and Government.	Buhari attends the 30th Summit of African Union Heads of State and Government. Buhari was named the 2018 Anti-Corruption Champion. Buhari also met with former Nigerian president Olusegun Obasanjo.
United Kingdom	London	19 – 20 April	2018 Commonwealth Heads of Government Meeting	See also: Commonwealth of Nations Buhari attends the Commonwealth Heads of Government meeting held in London. On the sidelines of the summit held discussions with the Shell Group with regards to increased investments in Nigeria.
United States	Washington D.C.	28 April – 4 May	Working Visit	See also: Nigeria–United States relations Buhari hold bilateral talks with his US counterpart Donald Trump. Buhari was the first African leader to make a state visit to the United States after Trump was elected in 2016. Security agreements and defense contracts were discussed between the two countries.
Morocco	Rabat	10 – 11 June	Working Visit	Buhari undertook the first visit by a Nigerian Head of State to Morocco where he held bilateral talks with King Mohammed VI. The two leaders discussed issues with regards to agriculture, fertilized production and their commitment to the regional gas pipeline.
Mauritania	Nouakchott	30 June – 3 July	31st Summit of African Union Heads of State and Government.	President Buhari attends the 31st Summit of African Union Heads of State and Government. Buhari spoke on ‘Winning the Fight against Corruption, A Sustainable Path to Africa's Transformation’ during the summit.
Netherlands	The Hague	15– 18 July	20th Anniversary of the International Criminal Court	President Buhari is a keynote speaker at the hearing commemorating the 20th anniversary of the International Criminal Court.
Togo	Lomé	29 July	ECOWAS-ECCAS Summit	President Buhari attends the ECOWAS-ECCAS Heads of State and Government Summit on Peace, Security, Stability and Fight against Terrorism and Violent Extremism. He urged the leaders for stronger inter-regional collaborate on maritime security and anti-terrorism activities.
China	Beijing	1 – 7 September	7th Summit of the Forum on China–Africa Cooperation	Buhari along with various other African heads of state attended the China–Africa Cooperation Summit. President Buhari met with president Xi Jinping on the sidelines of the summit.
United States	New York City	23 – 29 September	Seventy-third session of the United Nations General Assembly	President Buhari attends the Seventy-third session of the United Nations General Assembly.
France	Paris	10 – 16 November	1st Paris Peace Forum	President Buhari attends the first edition of the Paris Peace Forum along with 60 other world leaders at the invitation of French president Emmanuel Macron.
Poland	Kraków	2 – 3 December	Summit	24th session of the Conference of the Parties
Niger	Niamey	25 December	60th proclamation anniversary of Niger	Buhari attends the celebrations of the 60th proclamation anniversary of the Niger republic.

== 2019 ==
The following is a list of international presidential trips made by Buhari in 2019. Between May 16–21, Buhari made a personal trip to Saudi Arabia to attend Lesser Hajj.

Country	Areas visited	Date(s)	Purpose(s)	Notes
Senegal	Dakar	2 April	Inauguration of Macky Sall	See also: 2019 Senegalese presidential election Buhari attends the inauguration of President Macky Sall's second term in office.
Jordan	Amman	4 – 7 April	World Economic Forum Summit	President Buhari attended the World Economic Forum on the Middle East and North Africa where he was a keynote speaker.
United Arab Emirates	Dubai	7 – 10 April	Summit	President Buhari attended the annual Investment Meeting in Dubai.
Chad	N'Djamena	13 April	Working Visit.	Buhari make a one-day visit to chad to attend the Extraordinary Session of the Conference of Heads of State and Government of the Community of Sahel-Saharan States to discuss regional security concerns.
Saudi Arabia	Jeddah	29 – 30 May	Summit	President Buhari attends the Summit of the Organisation of Islamic Cooperation (OIC).
Japan	Yokohama	28 – 30 August	Tokyo International Conference on African Development Summit	President Buhari attends the seventh TICAD summit in Japan. During the summit, the president held bilateral talks with Prime Minister Shinzo Abe. Various MoUs were signed between the two countries. The president requested that Japan assist Nigeria to combat piracy and illegal fishing.
Burkina Faso	Ouagadougou	14 – 15 September	ECOWAS Summit	President Buhari attends the ECOWAS Extraordinary Summit on Counter Terrorism. Leaders from Chad, Cameroon and Mauritania attended the event to formulate a plan to address the spread of extremism in the region.
United States	New York City	21 – 26 September	Seventy-fourth session of the United Nations General Assembly	President Buhari attends the Seventy-fourth session of the United Nations General Assembly
South Africa	Pretoria	2 – 4 October	State Visit.	President Buhari makes a three-day official visit to South Africa where he met with President Cyril Ramaphosa. The visit came after months of xenophobic attacks in South Africa directed against Nigerians and other African migrants.
Russia	Sochi	21 – 23 October	Working Visit.	1st Russia-Africa Summit
Saudi Arabia	Riyadh	29 – 31 October (Buhari remained in Saudi until 1 November)	Summit	President Buhari attends the third Future Investment Initiative business forum that was hosted by the Saudi Public Investment Fund. The event was hosted by King Salman bin Abdulaziz. After the summit, Buhari visited Jeddah to perform Hajj.

== 2020 ==
The following is a list of international presidential trips made by Buhari in 2020.

Country	Areas visited	Date(s)	Purpose(s)	Notes
United Kingdom	London	18 – 23 January	Summit	President Buhari attends the UK Africa Investment Summit 2020.
Ethiopia	Addis Ababa	7 – 8 February	33rd Summit of African Union Heads of State and Government.	President Buhari attends the 33rd Summit of African Union Heads of State and Government.

== 2021 ==
The following is a list of international presidential trips made by Buhari in 2021. In April 2021, Buhari made a visit to the United Kingdom, however, they were not in an official capacity and were for routine medical checkups.

Country	Areas visited	Date(s)	Purpose(s)	Notes
United Kingdom	London	27 – 30 July	International Summit	Buhari attends the Global Education Summit on Financing Global Partnership for Education (GPE) 2021 to 2025.
United States	New York City	18 – 24 September	UN Summit	Seventy-sixth session of the United Nations General Assembly.
Ethiopia	Addis Ababa	3 – 6 October	Inauguration of Abiy Ahmed	Abiy Ahmed's inauguration for a second term in office after the 2021 Ethiopian general election.
Saudi Arabia	Riyadh	25 – 28 October (Buhari remained in Saudi until 29 October)	Working Visit	President Buhari attends the Future Investment Initiative business forum. After the summit, Buhari visited Jeddah to perform Hajj.
France	Paris	10 – 13 November	Working Visit, Paris Peace Forum	President Buhari hold bilateral talks with President Emmanuel Macron and then attends the Paris Peace Forum.

== 2022 ==
The following is a list of international presidential trips made by Buhari in 2022. Buhari made two trips to the United Kingdom in May and November 2022, however, they were not in an official capacity and were for routine medical checkups.

Country	Areas visited	Date(s)	Purpose(s)	Notes
The Gambia	Banjul	19 January	Inauguration of Adama Barrow	Adama Barrow's inauguration for a second term in office after 2021 Gambian presidential election.
Ethiopia	Addis Ababa	3 – 4 February	AU Summit	35th Ordinary Session of the Assembly of Heads of State and Government of the African Union.
Belgium	Brussels	17 – 18 February	EU Summit	6th European Union–African Union Summit
Kenya	Nairobi	2 – 3 March	Commemoration	Commemoration of the 50th Anniversary of the United Nations Environmental Program.
Ivory Coast	Abidjan	8-9 May	Conference of Parties	Attended The fifteenth session of the Conference of the Parties (COP15) of the United Nations Convention to Combat Desertification
United Arab Emirates	Abu Dhabi	21 May	Working Visit	Condolence visit following death of President of the UAE Khalifa bin Zayed Al Nahyan.
Equatorial Guinea	Malabo	26 – 28 May	AU Summit	African Union Extra-ordinary Session of Assembly of Heads of State and Government.
Spain	Madrid	31 May – 1 June	Working Visit	State visit with Prime-Minister Pedro Sánchez and King Felipe VI.
Ghana	Accra	4 June	ECOWAS Summit	2022 Second Ordinary Session of ECOWAS Parliament.
Rwanda	Kigali	22 – 26 June	CHOGM Summit	26th Commonwealth Heads of Government Meeting 2022.
Portugal	Lisbon	28 June – 2 July	Working Visit	Working visit with Marcelo Rebelo de Sousa and United Nations Ocean Conference.
Senegal	Dakar	6 – 7 July	IDA Summit	International Development Association (IDA) for Africa Summit.
Liberia	Monrovia	26 July	Working Visit	Liberia's 175th Independence anniversary celebrations.
United States	New York City	19 – 21 September	UN Summit	Seventy-seventh session of the United Nations General Assembly.
South Korea	Seoul	25 – 26 October	WHO Summit	1st World Bio Summit,
Niger	Niamey	25 – 26 November	AU Summit	African Union Summit on Industrialisation and Economic Diversification and the Extraordinary Session on African Continental Free Trade Area (AfCFTA).
Guinea-Bissau	Bissau	8 December	Working Visit	Amilcar Cabral Award awarded to Buhari by President Umaro Sissoco Embaló.
United States	Washington, D.C.	10 – 18 December	US Summit	Buhari attended the United States–Africa Leaders Summit 2022 along with 49 other African leaders.

== 2023 ==
The following is a list of international presidential trips made by Buhari in 2023.

Country	Areas visited	Date(s)	Purpose(s)	Notes
Senegal	Dakar	24 – 26 January	Dakar 2 Summit	Buhari attended the Dakar 2 Summit hosted by the African Development Bank called “Feeding Africa: Food Sovereignty and Resilience” where he was a keynote speaker. The event was attended by various African heads of states.
Ethiopia	Addis Ababa	17 – 19 February	AU Summit	36th Ordinary Session of the Assembly of Heads of State and Government of the African Union.
Qatar	Doha	4 – 8 March	UN Summit	President Buhari attended the Fifth United Nations Conference on the Least Developed Countries (LDC5) in Qatar.
Saudi Arabia	Jeddah	11 – 19 April	Working Visit	President Buhari makes his last official visit to Saudi Arabia, during the visit, the President performed Umrah.
United Kingdom	London	5 – 6 May	Coronation of Charles III and Camilla	President Buhari attends the Coronation of Charles III and Camilla along with other heads of Commonwealth of Nations. Buhari extended his trip by a week for personal medical appointments.
