= Foreign relations of Nigeria =

Since independence, with Jaja Wachuku as the first Minister for Foreign Affairs and Commonwealth Relations, later called External Affairs, Nigerian foreign policy has been characterised by a focus on Africa as a regional power and by attachment to several fundamental principles: African unity and independence; capability to exercise hegemonic influence in the region: peaceful settlement of disputes; non-alignment and non-intentional interference in the internal affairs of other nations; and regional economic cooperation and development. In carrying out these principles, Nigeria participates in the African Union, the Economic Community of West African States (ECOWAS), the Non-Aligned Movement, the Commonwealth of Nations, and the United Nations.

== Nigeria and International Organisations ==
Nigeria is a member of the following organizations:

- African, Caribbean and Pacific Group of States
- African Development Bank
- African Union
- Commission on Science and Technology for Sustainable Development in the South
- Commonwealth of Nations
- Economic Community of West African States
- Food and Agriculture Organization
- Group of 15
- Group of 24
- Group of 77
- International Atomic Energy Agency
- International Bank for Reconstruction and Development
- International Chamber of Commerce
- International Civil Aviation Organization
- International Criminal Court
- International Development Association
- International Finance Corporation
- International Fund for Agricultural Development
- International Hydrographic Organization
- International Labour Organization
- International Monetary Fund
- International Maritime Organization
- International Mobile Satellite Organization
- International Olympic Committee
- International Organization for Standardization
- International Red Cross and Red Crescent Movement
- International Telecommunication Union
- Interpol
- Non-Aligned Movement
- Organisation for the Prohibition of Chemical Weapons
- Organization of Petroleum Exporting Countries
- Organization of Islamic Cooperation
- Permanent Court of Arbitration
- United Nations
- United Nations Conference on Trade and Development
- United Nations Economic Commission for Africa
- United Nations Educational, Scientific and Cultural Organization
- United Nations High Commissioner for Refugees
- United Nations Industrial Development Organization
- United Nations Iraq-Kuwait Observation Mission
- United Nations Institute for Training and Research
- United Nations Interim Administration Mission in Kosovo
- United Nations Mission for the Referendum in Western Sahara
- United Nations Mission in Bosnia and Herzegovina
- United Nations Mission of Observers in Prevlaka
- United Nations Mission of Observers in Tajikistan
- United Nations University
- Universal Postal Union
- World Confederation of Labour
- World Customs Organization
- World Federation of Trade Unions
- World Health Organization
- World Intellectual Property Organization
- World Meteorological Organization
- World Tourism Organization
- World Trade Organization

The Babangida regime joined the Organisation of the Islamic Conference (OIC, now the Organisation of Islamic Cooperation), though President Obasanjo has indicated he might reconsider Nigeria's membership.comments are being made for Nigeria to establish more bilateral relations.

== Diplomatic relations ==
List of countries which Nigeria maintains diplomatic relations with:

#	Country	Date
1	Australia	1 October 1960
2	Canada	1 October 1960
3	Egypt	1 October 1960
4	Ethiopia	1 October 1960
5	France	1 October 1960
6	Germany	1 October 1960
7	Ghana	1 October 1960
8	India	1 October 1960
9	Israel	1 October 1960
10	Japan	1 October 1960
11	Liberia	1 October 1960
12	Norway	1 October 1960
13	Sudan	1 October 1960
14	Switzerland	1 October 1960
15	United Kingdom	1 October 1960
16	United States	1 October 1960
17	Lebanon	8 October 1960
18	Netherlands	4 November 1960
19	Turkey	9 November 1960
20	Ireland	14 November 1960
21	Russia	25 November 1960
22	Cameroon	November 1960
23	Morocco	1960
24	Senegal	1960
25	Belgium	4 February 1961
26	Spain	10 February 1961
27	Pakistan	22 March 1961
28	Serbia	March 1961
29	Sierra Leone	27 April 1961
30	Niger	8 June 1961
31	Ivory Coast	26 July 1961
32	Brazil	16 August 1961
33	Saudi Arabia	21 August 1961
34	Guinea	August 1961
35	Iraq	6 September 1961
36	Benin	12 September 1961
37	Jordan	30 September 1961
38	Sweden	3 October 1961
39	Chile	5 October 1961
40	Czech Republic	25 October 1961
41	Tanzania	6 December 1961
42	Italy	1961
43	Denmark	15 February 1962
44	Poland	30 May 1962
45	Mali	1 August 1962
46	Philippines	1 August 1962
47	Chad	18 October 1962
48	Thailand	1 November 1962
49	Austria	21 December 1962
50	Libya	1962
51	Togo	1962
52	Finland	18 January 1963
53	Argentina	19 March 1963
54	Uganda	6 September 1963
55	Bulgaria	10 March 1964
56	Hungary	4 April 1964
57	Kenya	28 May 1964
58	Democratic Republic of the Congo	27 November 1964
59	Uruguay	20 February 1965
60	Republic of the Congo	23 February 1965
61	Central African Republic	25 February 1965
61	Indonesia	5 March 1965
62	Malaysia	5 March 1965
63	Venezuela	16 March 1965
64	Gambia	28 May 1965
65	Syria	30 September 1965
66	Zambia	1965
67	Romania	12 November 1966
68	Algeria	2 September 1968
69	Equatorial Guinea	25 January 1969
70	Malawi	29 November 1969
71	Tunisia	15 January 1970
72	Singapore	20 January 1970
73	Cyprus	24 January 1970
74	Myanmar	24 January 1970
75	Kuwait	31 January 1970
76	Sri Lanka	January 1970
77	Burkina Faso	19 February 1970
78	Botswana	24 February 1970
79	Somalia	27 February 1970
80	Barbados	24 April 1970
81	Jamaica	29 April 1970
82	Guyana	27 July 1970
84	Trinidad and Tobago	6 October 1970
85	Iceland	3 November 1970
86	Burundi	6 November 1970
87	Greece	1970
88	China	10 February 1971
89	Madagascar	24 June 1971
90	Peru	5 July 1971
91	Mongolia	21 September 1971
92	Lesotho	November 1971
93	Iran	5 May 1972
94	Rwanda	10 June 1972
95	Gabon	18 January 1973
96	Albania	22 May 1973
97	Eswatini	13 October 1973
98	Malta	24 May 1974
99	Cuba	1 July 1974
100	Guinea-Bissau	1974
101	Mozambique	25 June 1975
102	Costa Rica	26 June 1975
103	Portugal	10 July 1975
—	Holy See	20 November 1975
104	Nepal	20 December 1975
105	Luxembourg	29 December 1975
106	São Tomé and Príncipe	30 December 1975
107	Bangladesh	3 January 1976
108	Angola	15 March 1976
109	Mexico	14 April 1976
110	North Korea	25 May 1976
111	Vietnam	25 May 1976
112	Mauritius	16 June 1976
113	Mauritania	June 1976
114	Cape Verde	18 August 1976
115	Seychelles	28 January 1977
116	Haiti	28 January 1978
117	Colombia	1 January 1979
118	Yemen	12 May 1979
119	Grenada	June 1979
120	Ecuador	10 December 1979
121	South Korea	22 February 1980
122	Suriname	3 June 1980
123	Oman	18 January 1981
124	United Arab Emirates	20 January 1982
125	Zimbabwe	January 1982
126	Vanuatu	16 March 1982
127	New Zealand	16 April 1982
128	Belize	19 April 1982
129	Papua New Guinea	August 1982
130	Bahamas	26 October 1982
131	Comoros	5 November 1982
132	Antigua and Barbuda	2 March 1983
—	Sahrawi Arab Democratic Republic	11 November 1984
133	Paraguay	27 May 1988
134	Maldives	1 March 1989
135	Djibouti	12 July 1989
—	State of Palestine	1989
136	Namibia	21 March 1990
137	Fiji	1990
138	Kazakhstan	16 December 1991
139	Azerbaijan	11 March 1992
140	Moldova	13 July 1992
141	Belarus	3 August 1992
142	Uzbekistan	28 August 1992
143	Estonia	10 November 1992
144	Brunei	1 December 1992
145	Ukraine	10 December 1992
146	Slovenia	19 December 1992
147	Croatia	7 January 1993
148	Armenia	4 February 1993
149	Slovakia	1 September 1993
150	South Africa	10 May 1994
151	Eritrea	1998
152	Laos	10 June 1999
153	Georgia	June 2000
154	Bosnia and Herzegovina	13 September 2000
155	Lithuania	17 January 2001
156	Panama	12 February 2001
157	Latvia	30 March 2001
158	Nicaragua	24 April 2001
159	Cambodia	28 May 2001
160	Dominican Republic	23 July 2001
161	Guatemala	December 2001
162	Dominica	2002
163	North Macedonia	24 April 2003
164	Timor-Leste	2004
165	Qatar	2010
166	Liechtenstein	28 October 2011
167	Monaco	6 July 2012
168	South Sudan	17 October 2012
169	Afghanistan	16 April 2013
170	Honduras	25 September 2013
171	Bolivia	20 September 2021
172	Bahrain	9 February 2025
173	Saint Lucia	30 June 2025
174	Saint Kitts and Nevis	Unknown

== Africa ==
Country	Formal Relations Began	Notes
Angola		See Angola–Nigeria relations Angolan-Nigerian relations are primarily based on their roles as oil exporting nations. Both are members of the Organization of the Petroleum Exporting Countries, the African Union and other multilateral organizations. The President of Nigeria, Muhammadu Buhari, sent a message to his Angolan counterpart, José Eduardo dos Santos, in which he manifested his interest in keeping and strengthening the excellent relations that exist between both countries, aiming at generating better benefits for the two peoples.: Angola has an embassy in Abuja.; Nigeria has an embassy in Luanda.
Cameroon		See Cameroon-Nigeria relations A long-standing border dispute with Cameroon over the potentially oil-rich Bakassi Peninsula was resolved by a 2002 decision by the International Court of Justice which granted Cameroon ownership of the region and the 2006 signing of the Greentree Agreement which led to the withdrawal of Nigerian troops from Bakassi in 2008 and complete administrative control being taken over by Cameroon in August 2013. Nigeria released about 150 Cameroonian prisoners of war in late 1998.: Cameroon has a high commission in Abuja and a consulate-general in Calabar.; Nigeria has a high commission in Yaoundé, a consulate-general in Douala and a consulate in Buea.
Chad		See Chad–Nigeria relations Nigeria's 1983 economic austerity campaign produced strains with neighbouring states, including Chad. Nigeria expelled several hundred thousand foreign workers, mostly from its oil industry, which faced drastic cuts as a result of declining world oil prices. At least 30,000 of those expelled were Chadians. Despite these strains, however, Nigerians had assisted in the halting process of achieving stability in Chad, and both nations reaffirmed their intention to maintain close ties.: Chad has an embassy in Abuja and a consulate in Maiduguri.; Nigeria has an embassy in N'Djamena.
Ethiopia		Main article: Ethiopia–Nigeria relations: Ethiopia has an embassy in Abuja.; Nigeria has an embassy in Addis Ababa.
Ghana	1 October 1960	See Ghana–Nigeria relations Ghana set up a commission in 1959 when Nigeria was still a dependent territory. This was elevated to High Commission status on the attainment of Nigeria's independence on 1 October 1960 Ghana Nigerian relations have been both bitter and sweet. In 1969 numerous Nigerians were deported from Ghana. Relations in the 1970s were good. Ghana-Nigeria relations began on a sour note in the early period of PNDC rule. Tension rose immediately after the PNDC deposed Limann in 1981. In protest, Nigeria refused to continue much-needed oil supplies to Ghana. At the time, Ghana owed Nigeria about US$150 million for crude oil supplies and depended on Nigeria for about 90 percent of its petroleum needs. Nigeria's expulsion of more than 1 million Ghanaian immigrants in early 1983, when Ghana was facing severe drought and economic problems, and of another 300,000 in early 1985 on short notice, further strained relations between the two countries. In April 1988, a joint commission for cooperation was established between Ghana and Nigeria. A bloodless coup in August 1985 had brought Major General Ibrahim Babangida to power in Nigeria, and Rawlings took advantage of the change of administration to pay an official visit. The two leaders discussed a wide range of issues focusing on peace and prosperity within West Africa, bilateral trade, and the transition to democracy in both countries. In early January 1989, Babangida reciprocated with an official visit to Ghana, which the PNDC hailed as a watershed in Ghana-Nigeria relations. Subsequent setbacks that Babangida initiated in the democratic transition process in Nigeria clearly disappointed Accra. Nonetheless, the political crisis that followed Babangida's annulment of the results of the June 1993 Nigerian presidential election and Babangida's resignation from the army and presidency two months later did not significantly alter the existing close relations between Ghana and Nigeria, two of the most important members of ECOWAS and the Commonwealth of Nations. After the takeover in November 1993 by General Sani Abacha as the new Nigerian head of state, Ghana and Nigeria continued to consult on economic, political, and security issues affecting the two countries and West Africa as a whole. Between early August 1994 when Rawlings became ECOWAS chairman and the end of the following October, the Ghanaian president visited Nigeria three times to discuss the peace process in Liberia and measures to restore democracy in that country. Nigeria and Ghana today have a close relationship, and they collaborate on various issues. Ghana and Nigeria are both republics in the Commonwealth of Nations.: Ghana has a high commission in Abuja and a consulate-general in Lagos.; Nigeria has a high commission in Accra.; Both countries are full members of the Commonwealth of Nations.
Kenya		See Kenya–Nigeria relations: Kenya has a high commission in Abuja.; Nigeria has a high commission in Nairobi.; Both countries are full members of the Commonwealth of Nations.
Libya		Nigeria recalled its ambassador, Isa Aliyu Mohammed, to Libya on 18 March 2010. The recall was in responses to a suggestion by Libyan leader, Colonel Muammar Gaddafi, that Nigeria should separate into a Muslim northern state and a Christian southern state. Gaddafi had made the suggestion in light of recent violence between the rival religions in Nigeria which had resulted in hundreds of deaths. In addition Gaddafi had praised the Partition of India, which resulted in the deaths of hundreds of thousands of people, as the kind of model that Nigeria should follow. The Nigerian foreign ministry stated that it was recalling Mohammed for "urgent negotiations" due to the "irresponsible utterances of Colonel Gaddafi". The Nigerian National Assembly has requested that the government ask the United Nations to prohibit Gaddafi from calling for the division of Nigeria. The National Assembly also passed a motion urging the government to order an African Union investigation into whether Libya was attempting to destabilise the country through "infiltrators".: Libya has an embassy in Abuja.; Nigeria has an embassy in Tripoli.
Malawi	29 November 1969	See Malawi–Nigeria relations Both countries established diplomatic relations on 29 November 1969.: Malawi is accredited to Nigeria from its embassy in Addis Ababa, Ethiopia.; Nigeria has a high commission in Lilongwe.
Namibia	28 March 1990	Both countries established diplomatic relations on 28 March 1990.: Namibia has a high commission in Abuja.; Nigeria has a high commission in Windhoek.
Niger	8 June 1961	See Niger–Nigeria relations Both countries established diplomatic relations on 8 June 1961 when M. Elhad Camatte Hammodon Maiga, ambassador of Niger to Nigeria presented his letters of credentials to the Governor General Azikiwe Nigeria maintains close relations with the Republic of Niger, in part because both nations share a large Hausa minority on each side of their 1500 km border. Hausa language and cultural ties are strong, but there is little interest in a pan-Hausa state. The two nations formed the Nigeria-Niger Joint Commission for Cooperation (NNJC), established in March, 1971 with its Permanent Secretariat in Niamey, Niger.: Niger has an embassy in Abuja and a consulate-general in Kano.; Nigeria has an embassy in Niamey.
South Africa	21 February 1994	See Nigeria–South Africa relations Both countries established diplomatic relations on 21 February 1994: Nigeria has a high commission in Pretoria and a consulate-general in Johannesburg.; South Africa has a high commission in Abuja and a consulate-general in Lagos.; Both countries are full members of the Commonwealth of Nations.

== Americas ==
Country	Formal Relations Began	Notes
Barbados	24 April 1970	See Barbados–Nigeria relations: Both countries established diplomatic relations on 24 April 1970; Nigeria is accredited to Barbados from its high commission in Port of Spain, Trinidad and Tobago.; Currently the Barbadian Government does not have foreign accreditation for Nigeria, however the Nigerian Government has said that it was highly desirous of Barbados establishing an embassy directly to Nigeria.; In 2006 the Governor Otunba Gbenga Daniel of the Nigerian state of Ogun announced that Barbadians would be given free land if they wished to move to Nigeria. Nigeria has pushed for more investment from Barbadian companies and investors and then in 2008 for the establishment of direct flights between both nations.: Both countries are full members of the Commonwealth of Nations.
Brazil	16 August 1961	See Brazil–Nigeria relations Both countries established diplomatic relations on 16 August 1961 Bilateral relations between Nigeria and Brazil focus primarily upon trade and culture, the largest country in Latin America by size, and the largest country in Africa by population are remotely bordered across from one another by the Atlantic Ocean. Brazil and Nigeria for centuries, have enjoyed a warmly friendly, and strong relationship on the bases of culture (seeing as many Afro-Brazilians trace their ancestry to Nigeria,) and commercial trade.: Brazil has an embassy in Abuja and a consulate-general in Lagos.; Nigeria has an embassy in Brasília.
Canada	1 October 1960	See Canada–Nigeria relations: Both countries established diplomatic relations on 1 October 1960; Canada has a high commission in Abuja and a deputy high commission on Lagos.; Nigeria has a high commission in Ottawa.; Both countries are full members of the Commonwealth of Nations.; Canadian Ministry of Foreign Affairs and International Trade about relations with Nigeria
Mexico	14 April 1976	Both countries established diplomatic relations on 14 April 1976 See Mexico–Nigeria relations: Mexico has an embassy in Abuja.; Nigeria has an embassy in Mexico City.
United States	1 October 1960	Both countries established diplomatic relations on 1 October 1960 See Nigeria–United States relations After the June 12, 1993, Nigerian presidential election was annulled, and in light of human rights abuses and the failure to embark on a meaningful democratic transition, the United States imposed numerous sanctions on Nigeria. These sanctions included the imposition of Section 212(f) of the Immigration and Nationality Act to refuse entry into the United States of senior government officials and others who formulated, implemented, or benefited from policies impeding Nigeria's transition to democracy; suspension of all military assistance; and a ban on the sale and repair of military goods and refinery services to Nigeria. The U.S. Ambassador was recalled for consultations for four months after the execution of the Ogoni Nine on November 10, 1995. After a period of increasingly strained relations, the death of General Abacha in June 1998 and his replacement by General Abubakar opened a new phase of improved bilateral relations. As the transition to democracy progressed, the removal of visa restrictions, increased high-level visits of U.S. officials, discussions of future assistance, and the granting of a Vital National Interest Certification on counter-narcotics, effective in March 1999, paved the way for re-establishment of closer ties between the United States and Nigeria, as a key partner in the region and the continent. Since the inauguration of the democratically elected Obasanjo government, the bilateral relationship has continued to improve, and cooperation on many important foreign policy goals, such as regional peacekeeping, has been good. The government has lent strong diplomatic support to the U.S. Government counter-terrorism efforts in the aftermath of the September 11, 2001 attacks. The Government of Nigeria, in its official statements, has both condemned the terrorist attacks as well as supported military action against the Taliban and Al-Qaeda. Nigeria also has played a leading role in forging an anti-terrorism consensus among states in Sub-Saharan Africa. As a member of the International Criminal Court Nigeria signed a Bilateral Immunity Agreement of protection for the US military (as covered under Article 98). A comprehensive passage is updated.: Nigeria has an embassy in Washington, D.C., and consulates-general in Atlanta and New York City.; United States has an embassy in Abuja and a consulate-general in Lagos.; Both countries were former colonies of Great Britain

== Asia ==
Country	Formal Relations Began	Notes
Azerbaijan	11 March 1992	See Azerbaijan–Nigeria relations: Nigeria recognized the independence of Azerbaijan on March 11, 1992. Diplomatic relations were established between the two countries at that date; Nigeria is accredited to Azerbaijan from its embassy in Tehran, Iran.
Bangladesh	3 January 1976	See Bangladesh–Nigeria relations Both countries established diplomatic relations on 3 January 1976. Both nations are members of the Commonwealth, the OIC and the Developing 8 Countries, and are identified as Next Eleven economies.: Bangladesh has a high commission in Abuja.; Nigeria has a high commission in Dhaka.
China	10 February 1971	See China–Nigeria relations Nigeria and the People's Republic of China established formal diplomatic relations on February 10, 1971. Relations between the two nations grew closer as a result of the international isolation and Western condemnation of Nigeria's military regimes (1970s-1998). Nigeria has since become an important source of oil and petroleum for China's rapidly growing economy and Nigeria is looking to China for help in achieving high economic growth; China has provided extensive economic, military and political support. In 2004 and again in 2006, Chinese President Hu Jintao made state visits to Nigeria and addressed a joint session of the National Assembly of Nigeria. Both nations signed a memorandum of understanding on establishing a strategic partnership. China has supported Nigeria's bid for a seat in the U.N. Security Council. In July 2019, UN ambassadors of 37 countries, including Nigeria, have signed a joint letter to the UNHRC defending China's treatment of Uyghurs and other Muslim minority groups in the Xinjiang region.: China has an embassy in Abuja and a consulate-general in Lagos.; Nigeria has an embassy in Beijing and consulates-general in Hong Kong and Shanghai.
India		See India–Nigeria relations The bilateral relations between the Republic of India and the Federal Republic of Nigeria have considerably expanded in recent years with both nations building strategic and commercial ties. Nigeria supplies 20% of India's crude oil needs and is India's largest trading partner in Africa.: India has a high commission in Abuja.; Nigeria has a high commission in New Delhi.
Indonesia	5 March 1965	See Indonesia–Nigeria relations Both countries established diplomatic relations on 5 March 1965: Indonesia has an embassy in Abuja.; Nigeria has an embassy in Jakarta.
Israel	1 October 1960	See Israel–Nigeria relations Both countries established diplomatic relations with Nigerian independence, Israel's consulate-general became an embassy on 1 October 1960. Between 1973 and 1992, diplomatic relations were severed. Since September 1992, bilateral relations are better.: Israel has an embassy in Abuja.; Nigeria has an embassy in Tel Aviv.
Japan		See Japan-Nigeria relations: Japan has an embassy in Abuja and a consulate-general in Lagos.; Nigeria has an embassy in Tokyo.
North Korea	1976	See Nigeria–North Korea relations: Nigeria has an embassy in Pyongyang which closed in 2021.; North Korea has an embassy in Abuja
Malaysia		See Malaysia–Nigeria relations: Malaysia has a high commission in Abuja.; Nigeria has a high commission in Kuala Lumpur.
Pakistan	22 March 1961	See Nigeria–Pakistan relations Both countries established diplomatic relations on 22 March 1961 Defence attachés from Pakistan and Russia visit the communications tent at the Nigerian Air Force Base, Abuja, Nigeria, on July 21, 2008, during Africa Endeavour 2008. The two states have maintained a close relationship, a relationship which is described by the Nigerian Defence Minister as "friendly" and like a "family tie": Nigeria has a high commission in Islamabad.; Pakistan has a high commission in Abuja.
Philippines	1 August 1962	See Nigeria–Philippines relations Both countries established diplomatic relations on 1 August 1962: Nigeria has an embassy in Manila.; Philippines has an embassy in Abuja.
South Korea	22 January 1980	See Nigeria–South Korea relations Both countries established diplomatic relations on 22 January 1980 Visits from the Republic of Korea to Nigeria: 1982 August President Chun Doo-hwan 1994 May Special Envoy of the President Roh Young-chan 1999 May Special Envoy of the President Choi Kwang-soo 2002 September Minister of Construction and Transportation Lim In-taek as a Special Envoy of the President 2006 March President Roh Moo-hyun 2007 May Vice Minister of Foreign Affairs Kim Ho-young 2007 July Minister of Construction and Transportation Lee Yong-seob 2007 December 2 Vice Minister of Commerce Industry and Energy 2009 May CEO of Korea National Oil Cooperation 2010 September Former Prime Minister 2011 May Special Envoy of the President.: Nigeria has an embassy in Seoul.; South Korea has an embassy in Abuja.
Turkey	16 February 1961	See Nigeria–Turkey relations Both countries established diplomatic relations on 16 February 1961 when Turkey Consulate General was upgraded to Embassy level with Mr. Özer Fuat Tevs as Chargé d'Affaires.: Nigeria has an embassy in Ankara.; Turkey has an embassy in Abuja.; Trade volume between the two countries was US$726 million in 2019.; There are direct flights from Istanbul to Abuja, Lagos and Port-Harcourt.

== Europe ==
Country	Formal Relations Began	Notes
Germany	1 October 1960	Both countries established diplomatic relations on 1 October 1960 See Germany-Nigeria relations: Germany has an embassy in Abuja and a consulate-general in Lagos.; Nigeria has an embassy in Berlin and a consulate-general in Frankfurt.
Greece		See Greece-Nigeria relations Greece established a diplomatic mission in Nigeria in 1970. Trade between the two countries is imbalanced, with imports from Greece to Nigeria exceeding exports. Greek-owned tankers have an important role in shipping Nigerian oil and natural gas, its main exports. Recently a Greek tanker was involved a dispute over crude oil smuggling. There is a small Greek business community in Lagos.: Greece has an embassy in Abuja and a consulate-general in Lagos.; Nigeria has an embassy in Athens.
Poland	30 May 1962	Both countries established diplomatic relations on 30 May 1962 See Nigeria–Poland relations: Nigeria has an embassy in Warsaw.; Poland has an embassy in Abuja.
Russia		See Nigeria–Russia relations: Nigeria has an embassy in Moscow.; Russia has an embassy in Abuja and a consulate-general in Lagos.
Spain	10 February 1961	See Nigeria–Spain relations Both countries established diplomatic relations on 10 February 1961: Nigeria has an embassy in Madrid.; Spain has an embassy in Abuja.
Sweden	3 October 1961	Both countries established diplomatic relations on 3 October 1961: Nigeria has an embassy in Stockholm.; Sweden has an embassy in Abuja.
United Kingdom	1 October 1960	See Nigeria–United Kingdom relations Nigeria established diplomatic relations with the United Kingdom on 1 October 1960. British Foreign Secretary David Lammy with Nigerian Foreign Minister Yusuf Tuggar in Abuja, November 2024.: Nigeria maintains a high commission in London.; The United Kingdom is accredited to Nigeria through its high commission in Abuja, and a deputy high commission in Lagos.; The UK governed Nigeria from 1862 to 1960, when Nigeria achieved full independence. Both countries share common membership of the Commonwealth, the International Criminal Court, and the World Trade Organization. Bilaterally the two countries have a Development Partnership, a Double Taxation Agreement, an Enhanced Trade and Investment Partnership, an Investment Agreement, and a Security and Defence Partnership.

== See also ==
- Jaja Wachuku - First Nigerian Foreign Affairs Minister
- List of diplomatic missions in Nigeria
- List of diplomatic missions of Nigeria
