= Nigerians in India =

- (Nigeria) (India)

Total population
- 50,000

Regions with significant populations
- New Delhi · Mumbai · Chennai · Bangalore · Kolkata · Jaipur · Kanpur · Hyderabad · Lucknow · Ranchi · Visakhapatnam · Raipur · Ahmedabad · Ludhiana · Patna · Bhubaneswar · Mysore · Faridabad

Languages
- Igbo · Nigerian English · Other languages of Nigeria · Indian languages

Religion
- Protestantism, Roman Catholicism and Islam

Related ethnic groups
- Nigerian people

Nigerians in India form one of the largest African communities in the country. As of November 2013, there were about 10,000 Nigerians living and working in india, and now as of 2024 there are around 50,000 Nigerians living and working in India. They live in cities such as New Delhi, Mumbai, Chennai, Bangalore, Kanpur, Hyderabad and Lucknow .

== Demographics ==
It is estimated that there are more than 2,500 Nigerians living in Delhi, 3,000 in Bangalore, and with another 4,000 spread across the rest of the country. Neither the Indian police nor the Nigerian High Commission has details of the number of Nigerians currently residing in India. Many Nigerians are also found in several unauthorized colonies like Munirka, Uttam Nagar and Mukherjee Nagar.

== Organizations ==
The All India Nigerian Students and Community Association (AINSCA), a non-official arm of the Nigerian embassy helps members of the community living in India. It liaisons proactively with Delhi police to nab unscrupulous elements in the community. It also shields its members involved in illegal sex trafficking from repercussions. Eddie, the chairman of AINSCA was filmed by BBC Africa Eye as one of the traffickers.

== See also ==
- India–Nigeria relations
