= Nigeria–United Kingdom relations =

- Nigeria: United Kingdom

Diplomatic mission
- High Commission of Nigeria, London: British High Commission, Abuja

Envoy
- High Commissioner Cyprian T. Heen: High Commissioner Richard Montgomery

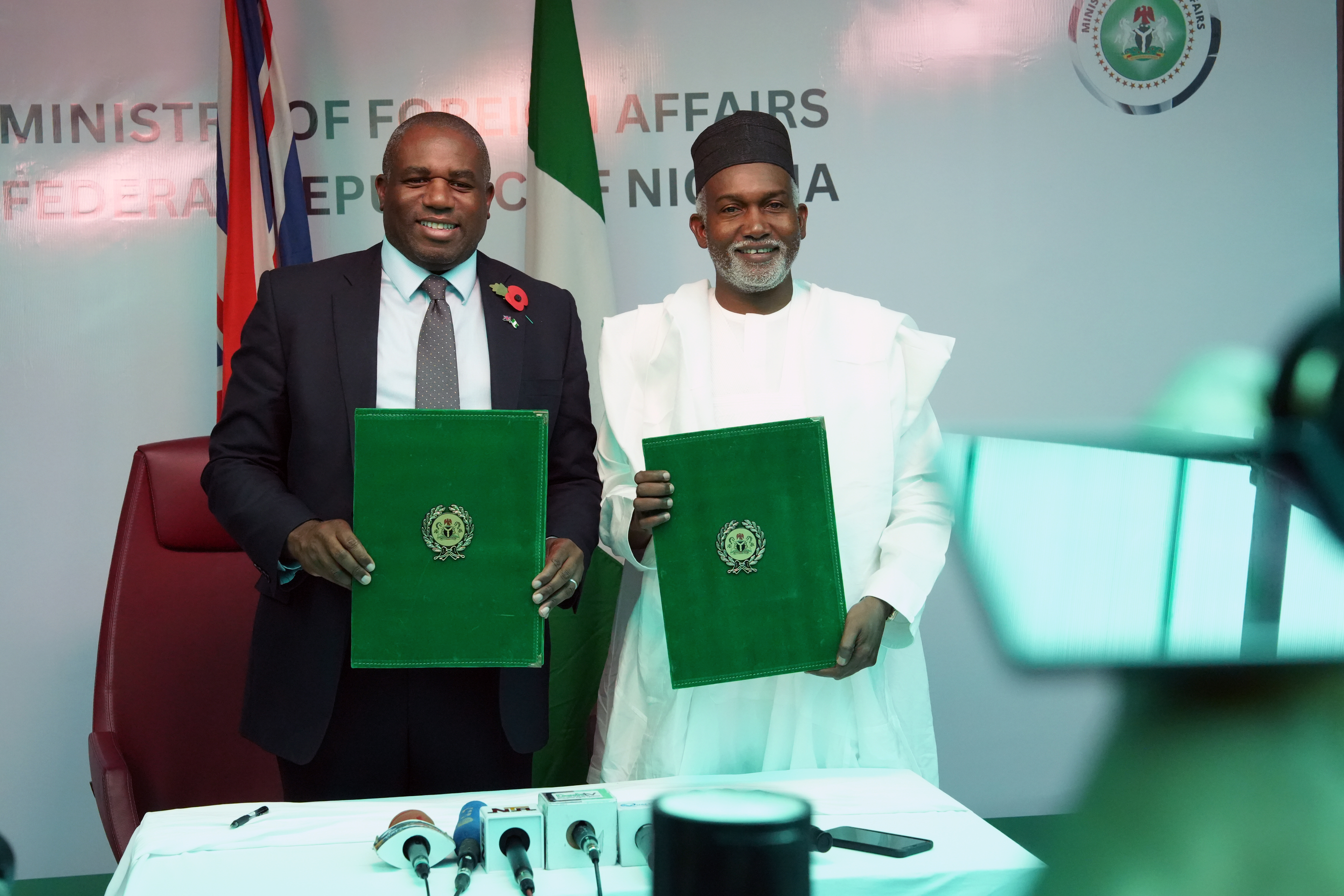
British Foreign Secretary David Lammy with Nigerian Foreign Minister Yusuf Tuggar in Abuja, November 2024.

Nigeria–United Kingdom relations include the historical, diplomatic, economic and political ties between the Nigeria and the United Kingdom. The UK governed Nigeria from 1862 to 1960, when Nigeria achieved full independence. Upon the independence of Nigeria, both countries established diplomatic relations on 1 October 1960.

Both countries share common membership of the Commonwealth, the International Criminal Court, and the World Trade Organization. Bilaterally the two countries have a Development Partnership, a Double Taxation Agreement, an Enhanced Trade and Investment Partnership, an Investment Agreement, and a Security and Defence Partnership.

== History ==
Nigeria’s relationship with the United Kingdom is rooted in a long colonial history. Britain consolidated control over the area in the 19th century, formally amalgamating the Northern and Southern protectorates in 1914 to create modern Nigeria. Nigeria gained independence from British colonial rule on October 1, 1960, joining the Commonwealth of Nations as a sovereign state. In the early years after independence, Nigeria maintained close ties with its former colonizer but also asserted its autonomy – for example, strong public opposition led to the cancellation of a proposed Anglo-Nigerian defense pact in 1962 (seen as neo-colonial). During Nigeria’s civil war (1967–1970), the UK supported the federal government, providing military assistance against the secessionist Biafra. Relations saw periods of tension in the post-colonial era: a major rift occurred in 1984 when a Nigerian-led attempt to kidnap exiled politician Umaru Dikko in London was foiled, prompting Britain to expel Nigerian diplomats and causing a breakdown in bilateral relations for years. In the 1990s, the military regime of General Sani Abacha strained ties further – Nigeria was suspended from the Commonwealth in 1995 after the execution of writer Ken Saro-Wiwa and other activists. Full diplomatic relations were restored only after Nigeria’s return to civilian rule in 1999, after which cooperation and high-level engagement resumed within the Commonwealth and other forums. Since then, the two countries have generally enjoyed cordial relations, working together on democratic governance and development initiatives while acknowledging the legacy of their historical ties. In a joint statement, both countries agreed to elevate their relations to a strategic partnership in 2024.

== Economic relations ==
Economic ties between Nigeria and the UK are substantial and multi-faceted. The UK has long been among Nigeria’s top trading partners, with British companies like Unilever, Shell, PZ Cussons, and Diageo having operated in Nigeria for decades. Bilateral trade in goods and services was about £7.2 billion in 2024, making the UK one of Nigeria’s leading trade partners in Europe (though accounting for a modest 0.4% of UK’s global trade). The trade balance is typically in Britain’s favor – UK exports to Nigeria include machinery, technology, and finished goods, while UK imports from Nigeria are dominated by oil and other natural resources. Energy ties are particularly important: Nigeria’s oil industry has significant British investment (Shell and other firms have long extracted oil in the Niger Delta). The UK is also a major source of foreign direct investment and capital inflows into Nigeria’s economy, with projects in sectors like energy infrastructure (for example, the UK’s development finance institution supported Nigeria’s Azura gas power plant). Both governments have worked to enhance economic cooperation through agreements such as a bilateral Double Taxation Treaty and an Enhanced Trade and Investment Partnership aimed at boosting investment.

== Security relations ==
Defense and security cooperation is a cornerstone of contemporary Nigeria–UK relations. The two countries maintain a Security and Defence Partnership signed in 2018 that facilitates training, capacity-building, and intelligence sharing. The UK has a resident British Military Advisory and Training Team (BMATT) in Nigeria, and between 2015 and 2017 around 700 British military personnel have rotated through to train Nigerian forces. Over 28,000 members of the Nigerian military have received UK training or education in recent years, covering areas such as infantry tactics, counter-insurgency, bomb disposal, and leadership skills. Joint exercises and mentoring programs are geared largely toward counterterrorism, given Nigeria’s fight against Boko Haram and Islamic State–affiliated insurgents in the northeast. British advisors provide non-combat support in the field – for instance, a UK Liaison & Support Team has been deployed alongside Nigerian commanders to offer operational guidance against Boko Haram. The UK has also assisted with regional security coordination by supporting the Multinational Joint Task Force of Nigeria and its neighbors, including sharing intelligence and funding equipment for the coalition. Counterterrorism collaboration – ranging from technical support (e.g. counter-IED training) to joint strategy development – has strengthened the military ties between the two nations.

In addition to training, the UK supplies some military equipment to Nigeria: since 2015 Britain has licensed over £40 million in arms exports to Nigeria (including military vehicles, protective gear, and small arms) though sales are subject to export controls and human rights considerations.

== Cultural relations and migration ==
Nigeria and the UK enjoy rich cultural relations underpinned by historical links and significant migration flows. The United Kingdom is home to a large Nigerian diaspora community – in 2021 around 300,000 people in the UK were of Nigerian origin, making Nigerians one of the largest African immigrant groups in Britain. This diaspora has become an important bridge between the two countries, contributing to the UK’s diversity and sending substantial remittances back to Nigeria (the UK is among the top sources of diaspora remittances to Nigeria).

Educational ties are especially strong: thousands of Nigerian students enroll in UK universities and colleges each year, continuing a trend of academic exchange that dates back to the colonial era. British institutions are highly regarded in Nigeria, and many Nigerian leaders and professionals have been educated in the UK. The British Council has been active in Nigeria for decades, promoting English-language education, cultural programs, and arts exchanges. In terms of media and the arts, there is a vibrant two-way influence. British literature, music, and television are popular in Nigeria, while Nigeria’s booming film industry (“Nollywood”), Afrobeats music, and writers of Nigerian heritage have found enthusiastic audiences in the UK. Notable British-Nigerians exemplify this cultural intertwinement. Authors like Ben Okri, Chimamanda Ngozi Adichie (who has lived in the UK), and other Nigerian creatives have gained prominence in the UK’s cultural scene. Cultural diplomacy also extends to heritage cooperation: Nigeria and the UK have engaged in dialogue about the repatriation of Nigerian cultural artifacts taken during the colonial period, such as the famed Benin Bronzes looted by British forces in 1897.

== State visits ==
There are regular state visits with visits between heads of state and ministers. Queen Elizabeth II visited Nigeria twice (in 1956 and again in 2003 to open the Commonwealth Heads of Government Meeting). Nigerian presidents and British prime ministers frequently meet at Commonwealth summits and bilateral visits – for example, President Muhammadu Buhari visited London multiple times, and Prime Minister Theresa May traveled to Abuja and Lagos in 2018, where she announced new partnerships on security and trade.

In March 2026, Nigerian President Bola Ahmed Tinubu paid a state visit to the United Kingdom, where he was received by King Charles III. This was the first state visit by Nigeria to the UK in 37 years.

== Resident diplomatic missions ==
- Nigeria has a high commission in London.
- United Kingdom has a high commission in Abuja and a deputy high commission in Lagos.

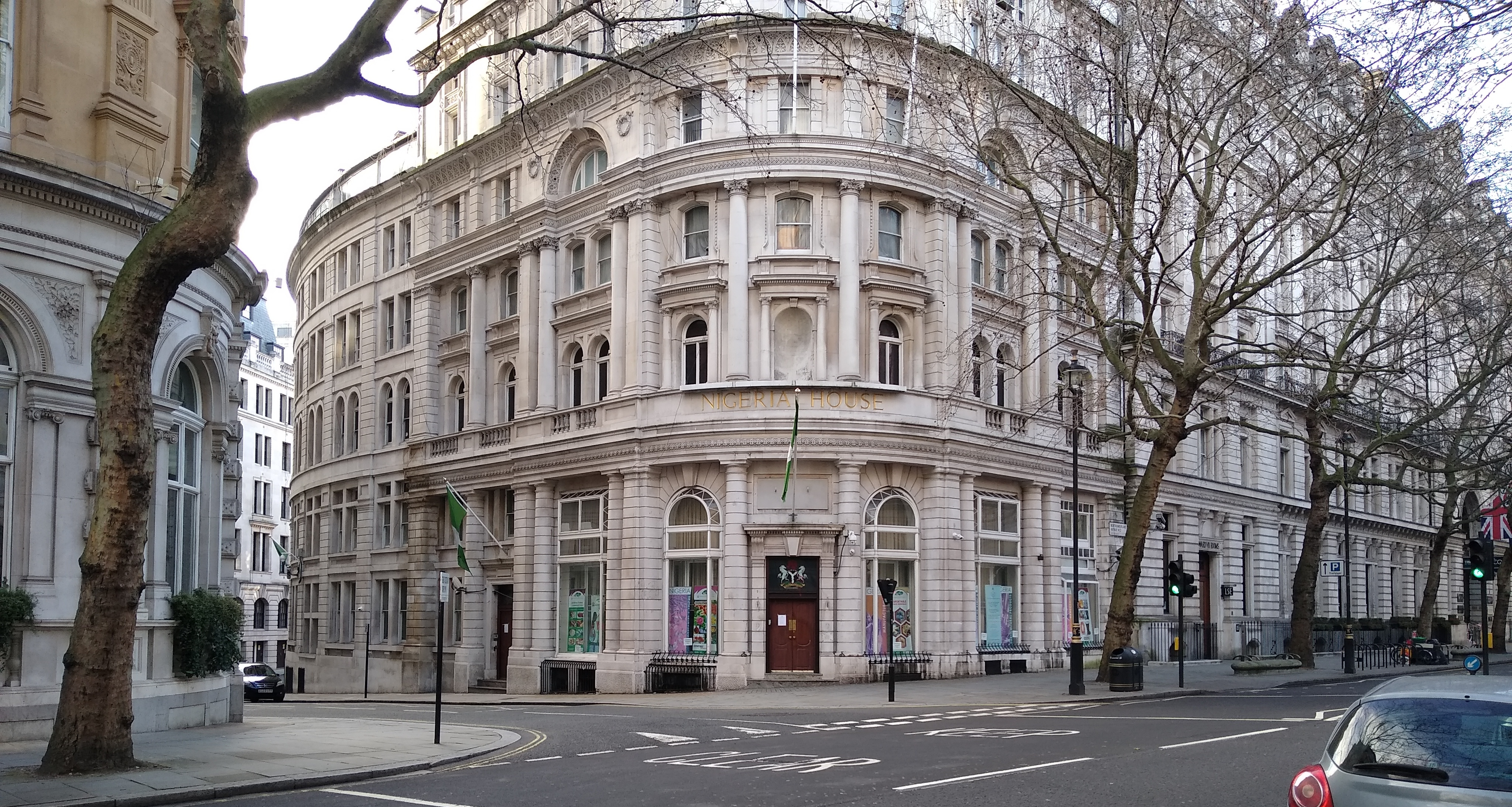
Nigerian high commission in London

== See also ==
- Foreign relations of Nigeria
- Foreign relations of the United Kingdom
