= Nigeria–North Korea relations =

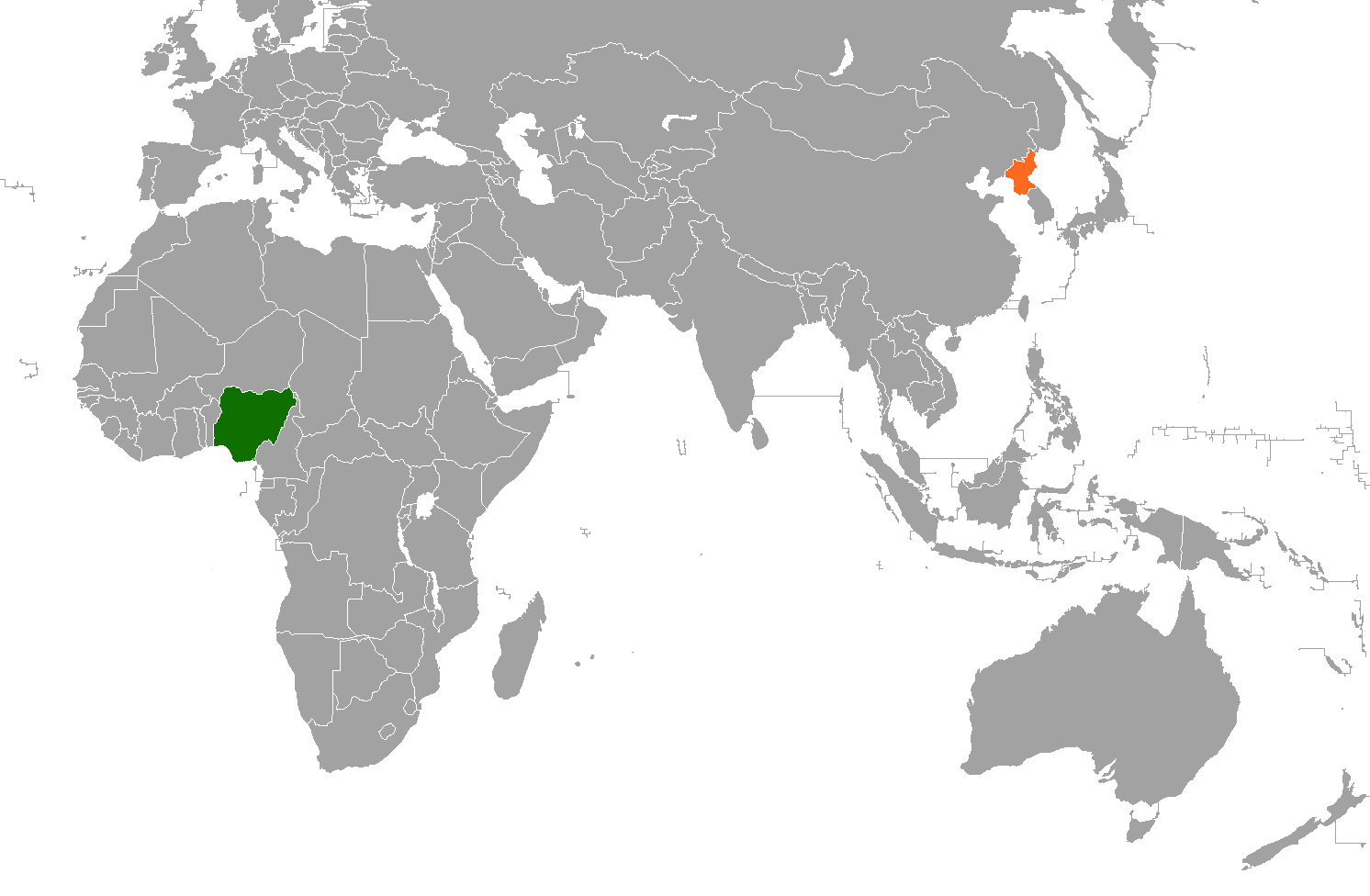

- Nigeria: North Korea

Nigeria maintains an embassy in Pyongyang and North Korea maintains an embassy in Lagos.

== History ==
In 1976, Nigeria and North Korea formally established diplomatic relations. Relations have since warmed with the establishment of several cooperation agreements. DPRK and Nigeria signed a "Memorandum of Understanding" regarding investment and economic cooperation between both countries in 2012. The Nigeria delegation arrived in DPRK in 2012 and delivered floral bouquets to statues of Kim Il Sung and Kim Jong Il in central Pyongyang. The delegation also visited Kim Il Sung's childhood home in Mangyongdae, Tower of Juche Idea and the International Friendship Exhibition. In 2014, both countries signed an economic cooperation agreement to facilitate knowledge exchange in information technology. The deal also makes it easier for experts, technicians and professors from DPRK and Nigerian universities to conduct research together. North Korean Ambassador to Nigeria, Jon Tong Chol, stated at the signing, he supported Nigeria becoming a permanent member of the United Nations Security Council. The agreement was announced at the Third DPRK-Nigeria Summit in Abuja.

In 2018, Ambassador Chol promised to further strengthen ties with Nigeria while celebrating Kim Il Sung's 106th birthday in Abuja.

The outbreak of the global COVID-19 pandemic spurred the development of a bilateral agreement between both countries in public health. A Memorandum of Understanding was signed on 17 June 2020, to further cooperation and aid in infection prevention and control, mental health and occupational health.

In 2021, an anonymous health professional reported that there were North Koreans still working in Nigeria despite a United Nations ban on DPRK labor. The ban was instituted to stop cash flow for North Korea's nuclear program and all DPRK workers were supposed to be deported by December 2019. As of November 2020, Nigeria reported to the UN that there were 37 North Koreans still awaiting deportation but were stalled due to North Korea's lockdown. Many North Koreans in Nigeria were healthcare workers brought over to assist Nigerian hospitals.

== Trade ==
North Korea exported US$2.5 million worth of goods to Nigeria in 2019. The biggest export to Nigeria was Polypropylene. Nigeria exported US$505,000 worth of goods, the most common being copper and aluminum.

== Nigerian-DPRK Friendship Association ==
The Nigerian-DPRK Friendship Association is a political organisation in Nigeria led by secretary general Dr. Alhassan Mamman Muhammad who claimed that the organisation had between 2,000-2,500 registered members and up to 10,000 unregistered followers. Although these numbers have not been independently verified. The organisation was founded in the late 1970's.

== See also ==
- Foreign relations of Nigeria
- Foreign relations of North Korea
