= Azerbaijan–Nigeria relations =

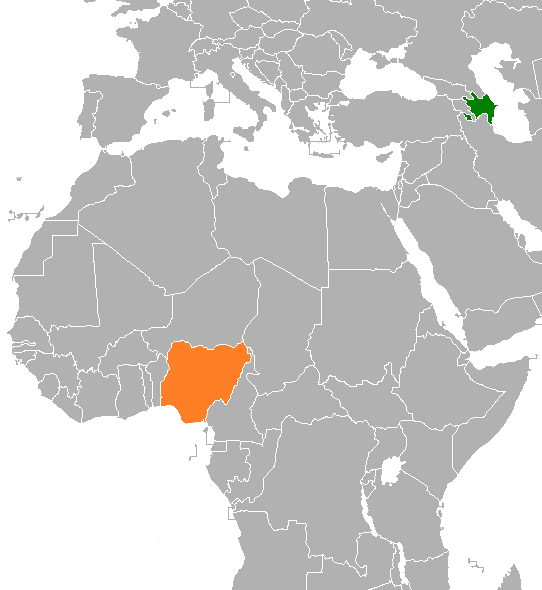

- Azerbaijan: Nigeria

Azerbaijan–Nigeria relations refer to bilateral relations between Azerbaijan and Nigeria. Neither country has a resident ambassador.

== Diplomatic relations ==
The government of Nigeria recognized the independence of Azerbaijan on March 11, 1992.

Diplomatic relations between Azerbaijan and Nigeria were established that same day.

On January 21–31, 2016, during the 26th meeting of the African Union in Addis Ababa, Azerbaijan's Ambassador to Nigeria Elman Abdullayev met with the Minister of Foreign Affairs of Nigeria Geoffrey Onyeama.

On 6 June 2023, President Ilham Aliyev sent a letter to President Bola Tinubu, calling for continued "fruitful cooperation from now on within multilateral organizations including the Non-Aligned Movement and Organization of Islamic Cooperation."

== Cooperation ==
=== Economic relations ===
In November 2009, SOCAR Trading opened a representative office in Nigeria. In March 2019, the management of the SOCAR Trading announced its desire to extend the contract for the export of crude oil signed with the Nigerian National Petroleum Corporation. According to statistics, SOCAR exports approximately 1 million barrels of crude oil to Nigeria every month. It is planned to create an intergovernmental Commission (IPC) to expand cooperation in the economy.

=== Military-technical cooperation ===
On February 7, 2019, Lieutenant General Ramiz Tahirov, Commander of the Air Force of Azerbaijan, met with a delegation led by the Chief of the Air Staff of the Nigerian Air Force Sadique Abubakar during his visit to Azerbaijan. Prospects for cooperation in the military sphere were discussed.

=== Humanitarian assistance ===
In 2008, the government of Azerbaijan provided $10,000 US dollars in financial assistance to support Nigeria in its global polio eradication initiative at the World Health Organization (WHO).

On May 14–22, 2013, at the initiative of the Azerbaijan International Development Agency (AIDA), The Agency for International Cooperation under the President of Colombia, the Organization of Islamic Cooperation (OIC), and the Higher School of Petroleum of Azerbaijan, a refresher course on "Engineering and Innovation in oil refining technology" was organized. 14 experts from Colombia and a number of African countries (Nigeria, Algeria, Angola, Cameroon, Chad, Egypt, Libya, Mauritania, South Africa, Sudan) participated in the event.

In 2017, the leadership of the Azerbaijan International Development Agency provided US$50,000 in financial assistance to the residents of Somalia, Yemen, South Sudan, and North-Eastern Nigeria to prevent a cultural crisis.

The "Educational grant program for citizens of the Organization of Islamic Cooperation member countries" and "Educational grant program for citizens of the Non-aligned Movement member countries" were approved by the orders of the President of Azerbaijan on December 6, 2017, and January 10, 2018. Educational grant programs are available for undergraduate, postgraduate, doctoral, basic education, and residency programs in medical education. A total of 40 citizens from 14 countries of the Organization of Islamic Cooperation (OIC) and 15 countries of the Non-Aligned Movement (20 applicants per program) were granted the right to study at Azerbaijani universities. Currently, the citizens of Nigeria are being trained in Azerbaijan in the framework of the educational grant programs.

== International cooperation ==
In March 2017, at the initiative of the International Women's Organization of Nigeria, a children's charity event "Little world" was held in Lagos. The Azerbaijani side was represented by the Minister of culture of Azerbaijan, members of the diplomatic corps, journalists, etc.

== See also ==
- Foreign relations of Azerbaijan
- Foreign relations of Nigeria
