= Malaysia–Nigeria relations =

- Malaysia: Nigeria

Malaysia–Nigeria relations refers to the bilateral relations between Malaysia and Nigeria. Malaysia has a high commission in Abuja, and Nigeria has a high commission in Kuala Lumpur. Both are the members of D-8 and have been diplomatic friends since early 1965 when the late Alhaji Abubakar Tafawa Balewa, Nigeria's first Prime Minister, became a good friend of one of Malaysia's post-independence leaders, Tunku Abdul Rahman. Their relations are based on economic co-operation.

== Economic relations ==
A Nigeria-Malaysia Business Council is existed between the countries. In 2015, the trade value between the two stood at $766.8 million with Malaysia's main export to Nigeria comprising petroleum products, palm oil and palm based products, machineries and processed food while Nigeria's main export to Malaysia was liquefied natural gas, iron ore, metal scrap and agricultural goods. Nigeria emerged as Malaysia's second largest trading partner among African countries, after South Africa.

== Education ==
Around 456 Nigerian officials also benefited from various capacity building programmes under the Malaysia Technical Cooperation Programme (MTCP), and Nigeria has become the largest source of African students in Malaysia.

== See also ==
- Foreign relations of Malaysia
- Foreign relations of Nigeria
- Africans in Malaysia
