= Nigeria–South Africa relations =

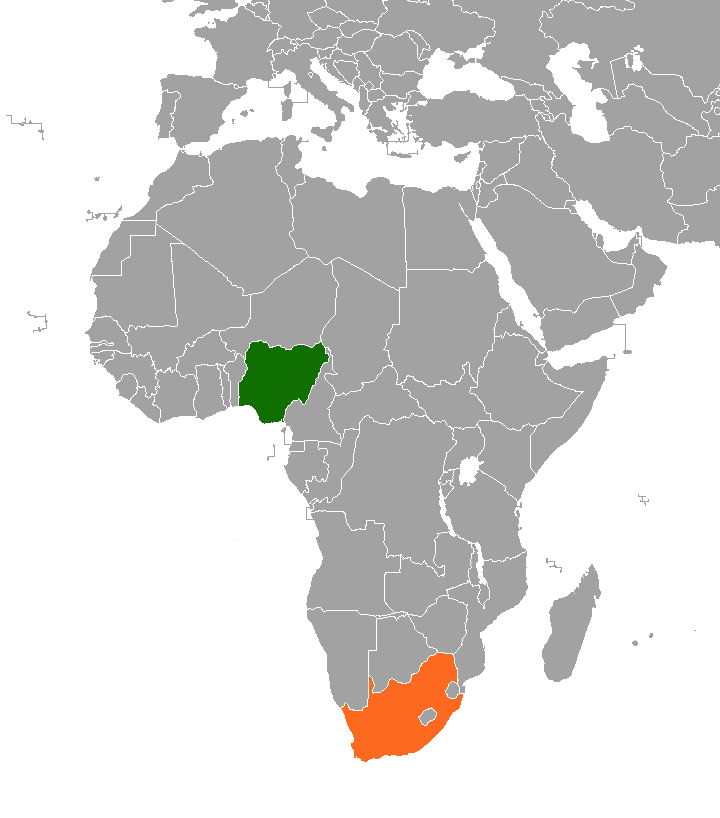

- Nigeria: South Africa

Nigeria–South Africa relations refer to the bilateral relations between Nigeria and South Africa. Both countries are former colonies of the British Empire, and both countries are members of the Commonwealth of Nations and African Union. Nigeria has a high commission in Pretoria and consulate general in Johannesburg. South Africa has a high commission in Abuja.

Nigeria played an active role in opposing the apartheid regime of South Africa. Despite the end of apartheid in 1994, relations between the two countries have experienced tensions due to competing economic and cultural influence, as well as various diplomatic disputes, including xenophobic violence in South Africa targeting Nigerians. The bilateral relations have been described as a "love–hate relationship".

According to a 2017 BBC World Service Poll, 53% of Nigerians view South Africa's influence positively, with 27% expressing a negative view. This is the lowest Nigerian positive perception of South Africa ever reported by the poll since polling began in 2009, with the 2014 poll reporting 65% of Nigerians viewing South Africa's influence positively and 17% expressing a negative view.

== History ==
=== Apartheid era ===
During the apartheid era in South Africa, Nigeria was one of the foremost supporters of anti-apartheid movements, including the African National Congress; the Nigerian government issued more than 300 passports to South Africans seeking to travel abroad. Sonny Okosun, a Nigerian musician, wrote the hit song "Fire in Soweto" in 1977 to commemorate the 1976 Soweto uprising against apartheid in South Africa.

=== Post-apartheid ===
Following the end of apartheid in 1994, South African businesses sought for professionals to immigrate, and a large number of Nigerians did so. It is estimated that there were 24,000 Nigerians living in South Africa in 2011.

Much of South Africa's good will towards Nigerians for supporting the ANC during apartheid has disappeared due to the activities of Nigerian organized crime in the country. Nigerian organised crime groups, mostly involved in illegal drug trafficking, in South Africa grew rapidly between 1994 and 1998.

Increasing competition between the two countries for positions at multilateral organizations is also thought to have worsened relations. Nigeria acted against South Africa to replace the incumbent Gabonese chair Jean Ping, who Nigeria supports, with South African Home Affairs Minister Nkosazana Dlamini-Zuma for the powerful position of the African Union Commission chairperson. Relations further deteriorated when South Africa backed incumbent president Laurent Gbagbo for control of Ivory Coast in 2011. However, after Dlamini-Zuma won the election Nigeria's Minister of Foreign Affairs, Ambassador Olugbenga Ashiru stated that although Nigeria supported Ping for the position of AU chairperson in "a position which was principled along with our ECOWAS members and we stood by it. But as usual, people can insinuate that once Nigeria was not in the camp of South Africa, it means that Nigeria is against South Africa. We are not against South Africa".

== Issues ==
=== Human Rights Criticism ===
The Mandela-led ANC had been seeking to help resolve the political crisis in Nigeria since 1993, following the annulment of the Nigerian elections in June 1993. In June 1994, Nigeria's military ruler, General Sani Abacha arrested and sentenced for execution 40 political opponents including former Nigerian head of state Olusegun Obasanjo as well as Chief Moshood Abiola. Mandela sent Archbishop Desmond Tutu and then Deputy President Thabo Mbeki on successive missions to Nigeria to lobby for the release of Obasanjo, Abiola and nine others.

Right up until the Commonwealth Summit in 1995, Mandela was misled by Abacha into believing that there would be a stay of execution. However, one of South Africa's first experiments with quiet diplomacy failed when in November 1995 Abacha moved ahead with the execution of the nine Ogoni leaders including Ken Saro-Wiwa. After which South African president Mandela then publicly criticised General Abacha for human rights abuses and personally pushed for a two-year suspension of Nigeria's membership in the Commonwealth of Nations. Mandela also criticised Royal Dutch Shell for going ahead with a US$4 billion gas project in Nigeria despite its unpopularity within Nigeria and the rest of the world.

This led to South Africa being isolated in Africa amid accusations that it was:

"[M]anipulated" into taking up an anti-Nigerian position by "the forces of British and American imperialism".

Within a month South Africa started back tracking in an attempt to patch up its relationship with other African nations; and in an attempt to regain regional prestige amongst other African governments at the expense of its international prestige. On 29 March 1995 Wole Soyinka, leader of an exiled Nigerian democratic movement, attempted to hold a conference in South Africa. The South African government responded by refusing to grant any visas to Nigerian democrats for six weeks prior to the conference. The ANC called for the conference to be cancelled.

The Nigerian debacle forced South Africa into a new foreign policy approach. Leading the country to abandon a "go it alone" policy and into a policy that sought to build partnerships with fellow African states through regional and continental bodies. It also made South Africa reluctant to engage in any confrontation with other African states.

=== Visa restrictions and expulsions ===
Relations between both countries were damaged in 2012 when 125 Nigerian travellers to South Africa were expelled due to not having valid Yellow Fever certificates. In retaliation, Nigeria expelled 56 South African businesspeople. This prompted the two countries to enter into fasting for a long period of time and without any sort of discussions around easing travel and visa restrictions between the two countries as a means of enhancing bilateral relations and trade.

=== Xenophobia ===
A factor in anti-Nigerian xenophobia is the fact that many Nigerians in South Africa have greater skills and education than the locals, giving them an advantage in the job market, making it difficult for the locals to get access to high-paying jobs given South Africa's already high unemployment rate. Recent attacks took place in 2009, 2015 and 2019, leading to the deaths and injuries of many impoverished Nigerians. The attacks instigated retaliatory violent reactions on South African businesses in Nigeria as many condemned the xenophobic violence taking place there.

In response, the South African President Ramaphosa, made an apology to Nigeria in 2019 through his envoy Jeff Radebe, stating that he was ashamed of the violence towards Nigerians. He said, "The incident does not represent what we stand for," adding that South African police would "leave no stone unturned" in bringing those involved to justice. Ramaphosa, addressing the BBC, further said "We are very concerned and of course as a nation we [are] ashamed because this goes against the ethos of what South Africa stands for". President Buhari responded to the apologies from the South African president, pledging that the relationship between the two countries will be solidified," a statement from his office said.

== Trade and investment ==
In November 2009, South Africa hosted the South Africa-Nigeria Bi-National Commission in Pretoria. At the conference, it was noted that Oando, an energy conglomerate based in Lagos had recently been listed on the Johannesburg Stock Exchange and the Nigeria-based Dangote Group had invested a record $378 million in South Africa's cement industry. In 2008, approximately $2.1 billion was traded between the two states. By 2012, total bilateral trade had increased to $3.6 billion.

In 2012, 83% of trade was taken up by South African imports of Nigerian crude oil. Between 2002 and 2012 South African imports from Nigeria have increased by 750% (mostly increases in oil imports) whilst Nigerian imports from South Africa have increased by 130%. The Nigeria - South Africa Chamber of Commerce serves to improve and facilitate bilateral trade relationships between Nigeria and South Africa. Its offices are in Lagos, Nigeria and it has in its membership 315 companies currently trading in both Nigeria and South Africa. It is made up of blue-chip companies, Nigerian companies and South African companies.

Nigerian businesspeople have expressed concern over the pace and perceived rapid expansion of South African business interests in the country.

== The halted Lagos-Johannesburg partnership ==
In May 2017, Akinwunmi Ambode, governor of Lagos State, Nigeria, met with David Makhura, premier of Gauteng Province, South Africa, to discuss the possibility of cooperation between their two sub-national governments on issues of good governance and trade. The two cities in these regions, Lagos and Johannesburg, are two of the largest cities in Africa. The partnership plans were halted, a follow-up meeting scheduled for September 2017 never took place, and there were a number of reasons why the momentum was lost. For example the above mentioned issues of xenophobia and rigid visa-regimes raised red flags in the bilateral relations between Nigeria and South Africa. Also, the Nigeria-South Africa Bi-National Commission (BNC) has been largely ineffective, and there are no platforms for cross-border city-to-city partnerships.

== See also ==
- Foreign relations of Nigeria
- Foreign relations of South Africa
