= Malawi–Nigeria relations =

- Malawi: Nigeria

Malawi and Nigeria have had diplomatic relations since 1964. The Malawian high Commission to Nigeria is based in Ethiopia. The Nigerian High Commission to Malawi is now based in Lilongwe, Malawi following the formal opening of Diplomatic Mission in September 2012 by the then-Nigerian President Goodluck Ebele Jonathan, GCFR.

== Early foreign policy ==
The relationship between the countries dates back to Kamuzu Banda's Foreign Policy and has included training programmes. This policy has continued through the next two administrations.

== Current situation ==
The Joyce Banda administration has moved to bring closer ties between the two nations.

== See also ==
- Foreign relations of Malawi
- Foreign relations of Nigeria
