= Indonesia–Nigeria relations =

- Indonesia: Nigeria

Diplomatic mission
- Indonesian Embassy, Abuja: Nigerian Embassy, Jakarta

Indonesia and Nigeria established diplomatic relations on 5 March 1965. Both countries are members of multilateral organizations such as the Non-Aligned Movement, World Trade Organization (WTO), Organisation of Islamic Cooperation (OIC) and Developing 8 Countries. Indonesia has an embassy in Abuja and Nigeria has an embassy in Jakarta.

== History ==
The diplomatic relations between the Federal Republic of Nigeria and the Republic of Indonesia date back to 1965, when Indonesia opened its resident diplomatic mission in Lagos. In 1976 Nigeria reciprocated by opening its mission in Jakarta. Nigeria was the first Sub-Saharan African country that established a diplomatic mission in Indonesia. Indonesia recognizes the important role played by Nigeria in Sub-Saharan Africa and has made Nigeria as its gate to West and Central Africa.

== State visits and meetings ==
There have also been an exchange of visits at the highest level, by former President Abdurrahman Wahid who visited Nigeria in 2001 and former President Olusegun Obasanjo who visited Indonesia three times in 2001, 2005 and 2006.

President Umaru Musa Yar'Adua and President Susilo Bambang Yudhoyono of Indonesia met in New York in 2007 and agreed to strengthen further economic relations between the two countries by increasing trade and encouraging investment. In February 2013, Yudhoyono visited Abuja accompanied by 99 businessmen to strengthen trade relations, and met Nigerian President Goodluck Jonathan.

== Cooperations ==
In 2001, Indonesia and Nigeria signed the Economic and Technical Cooperation Agreement, and establish the Joint Commission. The two countries in February 2013 signed multi-billion long-term agreements on airlines and aircraft maintenance. The agreement and contracts are between Garuda Maintenance Facility Aeroasia, Indonesia, with its Nigerian counterparts, including Kabo Air, Silverback Africa, Hak Air, Max Air and Service Air Ltd. In March 2007, an MOU was signed between the Economic and Financial Crimes Commission (EFCC) and the Corruption Eradication Commission of Indonesia (KPK). Other draft MOU/Agreements exchanged between the two countries include cooperation in trade, reciprocal promotion and protection of investment, agriculture, gas, and illicit drugs.

== Economic relations ==
Nigeria is Indonesia's second largest trade partner in Africa after South Africa, in 2011 the trade value reached US$2.09 billion accounted for 21.66 percent of Indonesia's total trade with Africa. In 2013, the bilateral trade volume between the countries hits $2.2 billion. As of 2022, the bilateral trade volume increased significantly, reaching $4.78 billion, which marks an 83% rise from $2.61 billion in 2021. There are over 15 Indonesian companies currently operating in Nigeria such as Indorama, Indofood, Kalbe Farma and Sayap Mas Utama. Indofood for example had established instant noodle factory in Nigeria since 1995 where Indomie has become a popular brand and have the largest instant noodles manufacturing plant in Africa. The two countries also planning a US$2.5 billion gas methanol and fertilizer plant in Nigeria with Pertamina of Indonesia and NNPC of Nigeria in collaboration with EuroChem Indonesia and Viva Methanol of Nigeria.

== See also ==
- Foreign relations of Indonesia
- Foreign relations of Nigeria
