= Nigeria–Philippines relations =

Nigeria-Philippines relations

- Nigeria: Philippines

Nigeria and the Philippines established their bilateral, diplomatic and trade relation in August 1962. Nigeria has an embassy in Manila and the Philippines has an embassy in Abuja.

== History ==
Before the establishment of the Nigerian Embassy in Makati, Metro Manila in 1981, the Nigerian Student Union in the Philippines served as the de facto consular office of Nigeria. The Philippines became a destination for Nigerian students as early as the 1960s.

On March 9, 1986, about 100 Nigerian students seized the Nigerian embassy in Makati, Metro Manila to protest against the diplomatic mission's alleged apathy to the plight of the then 400 Nigerians in studying in the country. They protested against the limits of remittances from their families imposed by the Nigerian government.

The Philippines previously imposed a deployment ban to Nigeria due to incidents of kidnappings of Filipino seafarers in the Niger Delta between 2006 and 2009 but has since been lifted after the Philippines recognized that the insurgency in the Delta has been properly addressed.

In 2012, the Nigerian government rued the poor trade relations it had with the government of the Philippines. Thereby calling for more active steps to be taken by both countries to further strengthen and deepen their existing ties in necessary areas. Nigerian Foreign Minister Professor Viola Onwuliri told an audience at the second edition of Nigeria–Philippines Joint Commission held in Abuja that in spite of the long-standing relations between both countries, the economic and trade relations have been quite low.

In 2015, the Nigerian government started the Water Supply Support Project to provide clean drinking water, water filtration and rainwater harvesting to areas affected by Typhoon Haiyan. Several Philippine companies have moved to Nigeria between 2012 and 2016, and some of these companies entered the Nigerian market with the help of the Nigerian Embassy in Manila Tacloban, which promoted and facilitated investment opportunities.

== Migration ==
Nigerians began to go to the Philippines for their studies in the 1960s.

Nigeria continues to be a hub for Overseas Filipinos primarily workers involved in the oil, gas and construction industry of the country.

As of 2011, there were 7,240 Filipinos in Nigeria, mostly professionals and spouses of Nigerian nationals.

As of 2014, about 8,000 Nigerians are studying in the Philippines.

== Resident diplomatic missions ==
- Nigeria has an embassy in Manila.
- the Philippines has an embassy in Abuja.

== See also ==
- Foreign relations of Nigeria
- Foreign relations of the Philippines
