= Ethiopia–Nigeria relations =

Bilateral relations

- Ethiopia: Nigeria

Diplomatic mission
- Embassy of Ethiopia, Abuja: Embassy of Nigeria, Addis Ababa

Envoy
- Ambassador of Ethiopia in Nigeria Azanaw Tadesse Abreha: Ambassador of Nigeria in Ethiopia

Ethiopia–Nigeria relations are bilateral relations between Ethiopia and Nigeria.

== Origins ==
The relations between the two countries date back to 1 October 1960. Ethiopia opened an embassy in Lagos in 1961, before it was later transferred to Abuja. The establishment of diplomatic ties officially took place in 1964.

== History ==
=== Imperial era ===
In the 60s and 70s, military officers of the Nigerian Armed Forces came to Ethiopia and were trained by the Army of the Ethiopian Empire at the Harar Military Academy.

=== Nigerian military regime and the Derg ===
By 1975, both Ethiopia and Nigeria were under military regimes who administered the government. Nigeria backed Ethiopia during the Ethiopian-Somali War, with the Obasanjo Administration backing the backed the call of Guinea (Conakry) for a demilitarized zone at the point of contact.

== Modern era ==
In December 2017, the Ethio-Nigeria Joint Ministerial Commission was held after 10 years in Abuja.

== State visits ==
=== Ethiopia to Nigeria ===
- Emperor Haile Selassie (14 April 1966)
- Emperor Haile Selassie (18-23 January 1972)
- Prime Minister Abiy Ahmed (25 May 2022)

=== Nigeria to Ethiopia ===
- President Muhammadu Buhari (7-8 February 2020)
- President Muhammadu Buhari (3 – 6 October 2021)

== Diplomatic missions ==
- Ethiopia maintains an embassy in Abuja.
- Nigeria maintains an embassy in Addis Ababa.

== See also ==
- Foreign relations of Ethiopia
- Foreign relations of Nigeria
