= Nigeria–Poland relations =

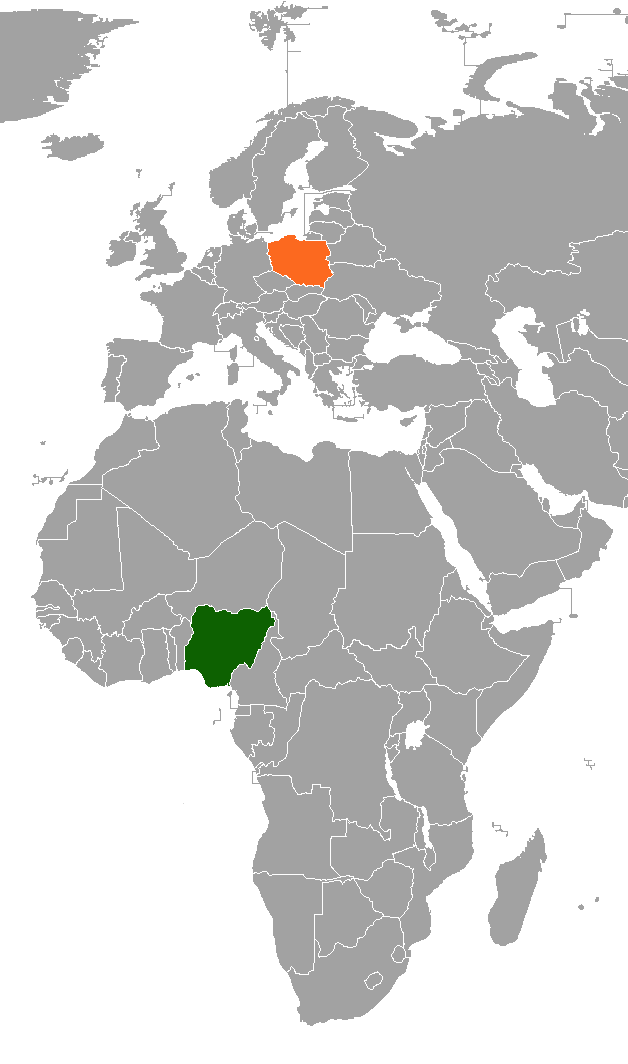

- Nigeria: Poland

Nigeria–Poland relations are the bilateral relations between Nigeria and Poland. Both nations are members of the United Nations and the World Trade Organization.

== History ==
Contact between Poland and Nigeria have distant roots in the past. In the 19th century, Polish explorer Stefan Szolc-Rogozinski, traversed Nigerian lands on an attempt to create a Polish colony in Cameroon. After World War II, many Poles decided to settle permanently in Nigeria.

On 1 October 1960, Nigeria obtained its independence from the United Kingdom. Soon afterwards, Nigeria and Poland established diplomatic relations. In 1963, Poland opened a resident embassy in Lagos (it would later relocate to Abuja in 2002). In 1969, Nigeria opened an embassy in Warsaw. During the Nigerian Civil War, Poland supported the Nigerian Federal Government. A cultural cooperation agreement between Nigeria and Poland was signed in Warsaw in 1976.

During the 1980s, there was stagnation in diplomatic relations between both nations. This was due to political and economic difficulties in Nigeria at the time (drop in oil prices and military upheavals) and political unease and the Solidarity movement in Poland. In the 1990s, sporadic political contacts were maintained.

In 1978, Nigerian President Olusegun Obasanjo paid his first visit to Poland. President Obasanjo would pay a second visit to Poland in October 2001 where he met with President (and former communist) Aleksander Kwasniewski. In April 2013, Polish Prime Minister Donald Tusk paid a two-day visit to Nigeria and met with President Goodluck Jonathan. In December 2018, Nigerian President Muhammad Buhari paid a visit to Katowice, Poland to attend the United Nations Climate Change Conference (COP24). During President Buhari's visit, he met with Polish President Andrzej Duda and Prime Minister Mateusz Morawiecki.

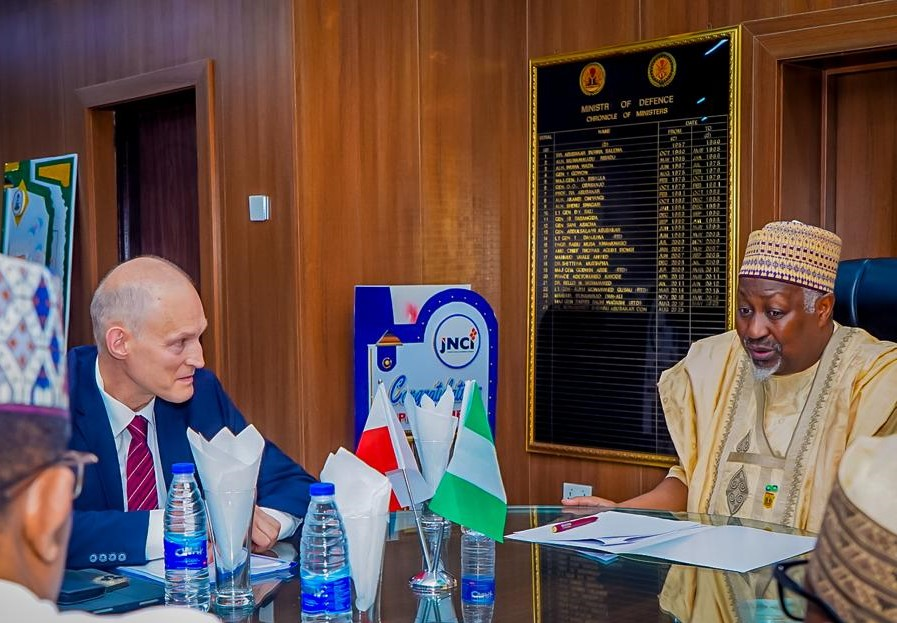
Undersecretary of State in the Ministry of Foreign Affairs of Poland Wojciech Zajączkowski and Defence Minister of Nigeria Mohammed Badaru Abubakar in Nigeria in 2025

Bilateral relations between Nigeria and Poland have been marked by mutual cooperation and support for each other in international forums. Poland regards Nigeria as one of its most important trade partners in Africa, south of the Sahara.

== Education ==
Nigerian students were the seventh largest group of foreign students in Poland in 2021, the tenth largest in 2022, the twelfth largest in 2023, and the thirteenth largest in 2024, at the same time being the second largest group from Africa. In the 2020–2021 academic year, the largest number of Nigerian students attended the John Paul II Catholic University of Lublin, University of Life Sciences in Poznań and Vistula University in Warsaw.

== High-level visits ==
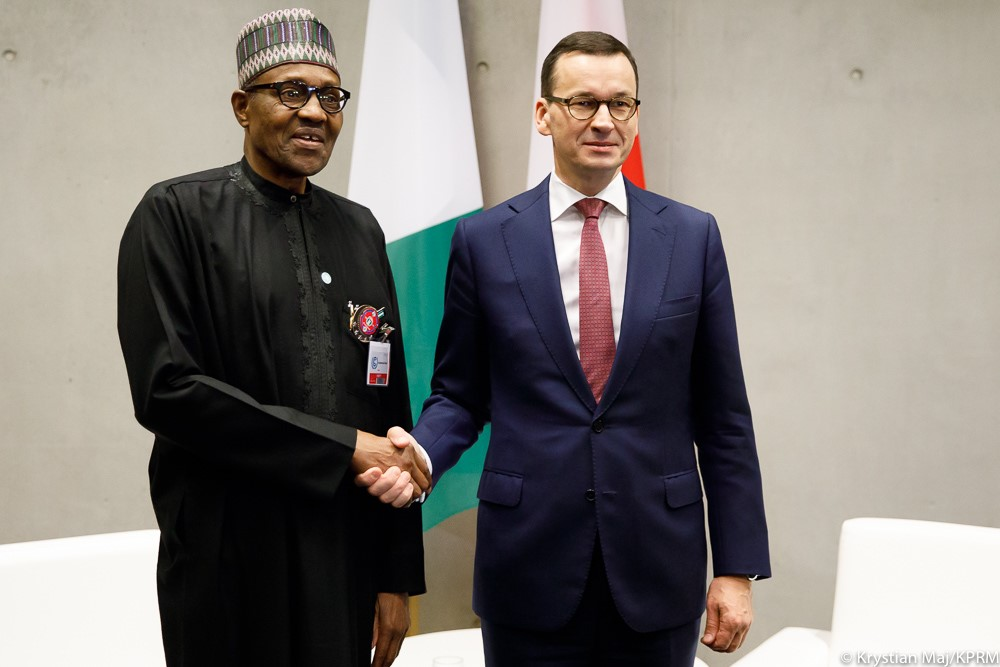
President Muhammad Buhari and Prime Minister Mateusz Morawiecki during meeting in Katowice, 2018

High-level visits from Nigeria to Poland

- President Olusegun Obasanjo (1978, 2001)
- Foreign Minister Sule Lamido (2000)
- Foreign Minister Viola Onwuliri (2014)
- Foreign Permanent Secretary Martin Ihoeghian Uhomoibhi (2014)
- Foreign Minister Geoffrey Onyeama (2016)
- President Muhammad Buhari (2018)

High-level visits from Poland to Nigeria

- Foreign Minister Włodzimierz Cimoszewicz (2004)
- Undersecretary of State Beata Stelmach (2012)
- Prime Minister Donald Tusk (2013)
- Deputy Foreign Minister Joanna Wronecka (2017)

== Bilateral agreements ==
Both nations have signed a few bilateral agreements such as a Trade Agreement (1962); Memorandum of Understanding on Political Consultations (2012); Agreement on Strategic Partnership (2013); and a Cooperation Agreement (2013).

== Resident diplomatic missions ==
- Nigeria has an embassy in Warsaw.
- Poland has an embassy in Abuja.
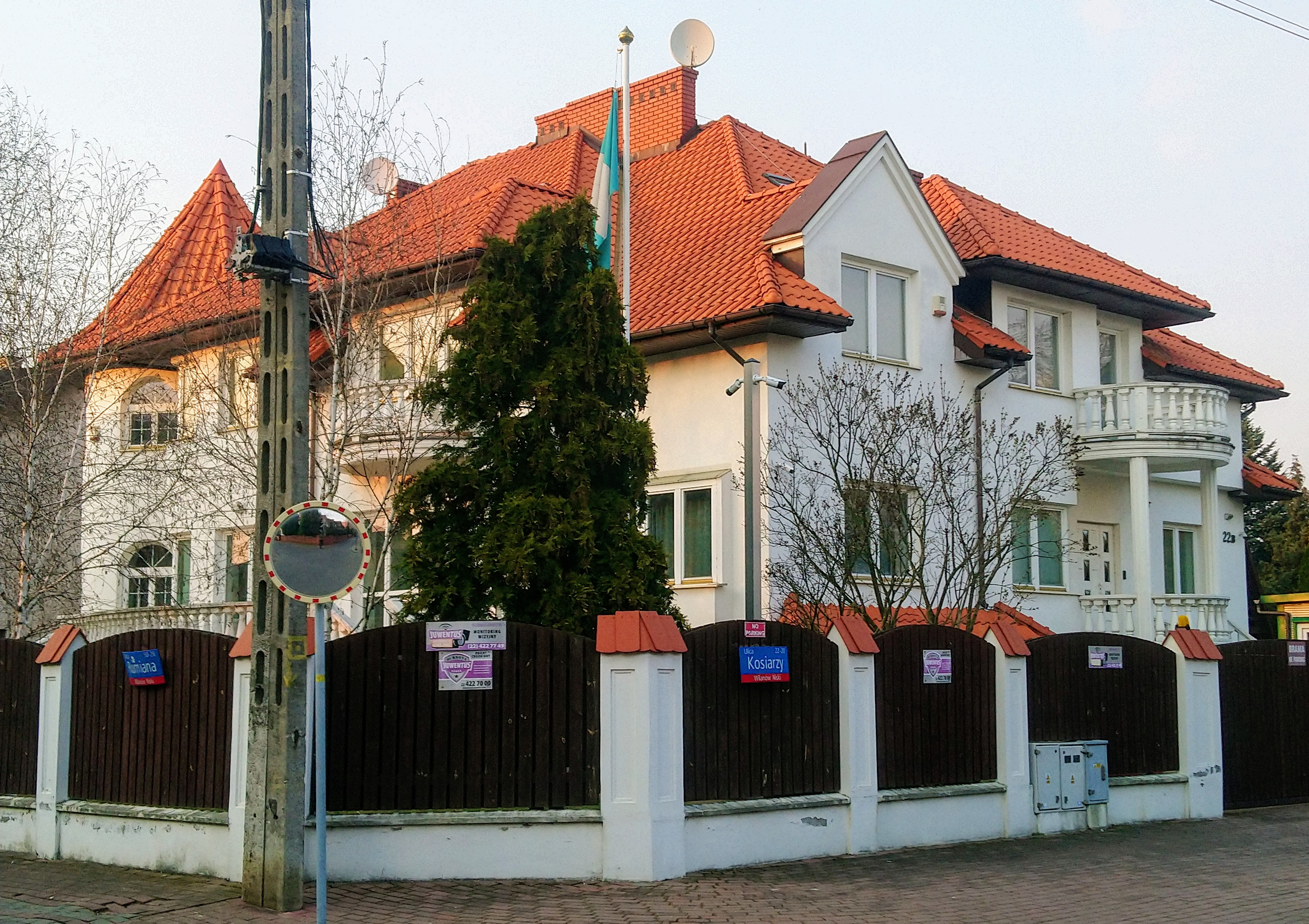
Embassy of Nigeria in Warsaw

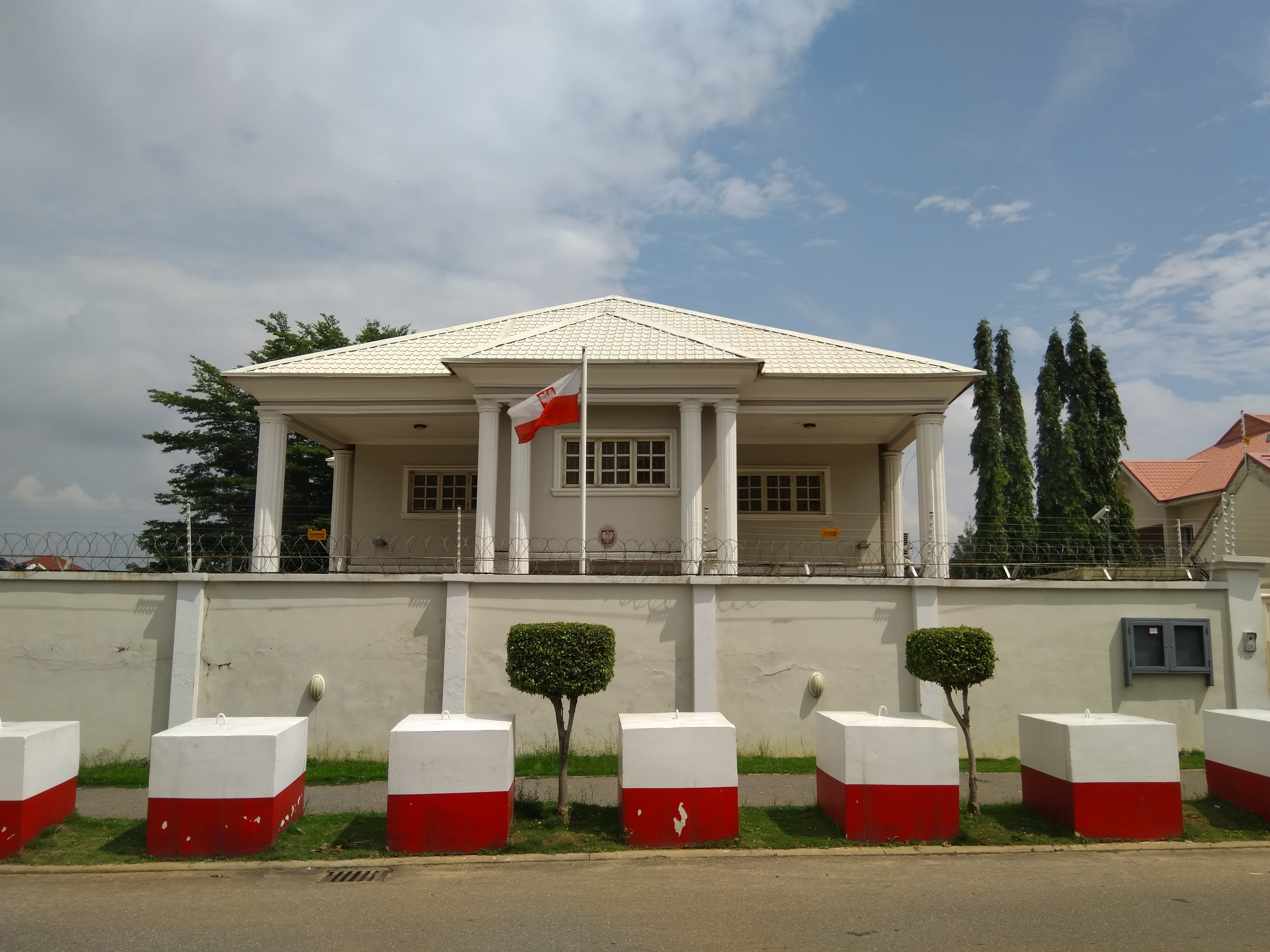
Embassy of Poland in Abuja

== See also ==
- Foreign relations of Nigeria
- Foreign relations of Poland
