= Nigeria–Turkey relations =

- Nigeria: Turkey

Diplomatic relations at the legation level were established in 1960 and then to the rank of ambassador in 1958. Turkey opened an embassy in Lagos, then capital of Nigeria in 1962. Turkish embassy moved to Abuja in 2001 after Nigeria's proclamation of Abuja as the new capital. Nigeria has an embassy in Ankara.

Nigeria and Turkey cooperate through their membership to OIC and D-8.

== Diplomatic relations ==
Turkey and Nigeria were pro-Western on most issues but Nigeria mainly sided with the Arab World against Israel, which was Turkey's closest ally in the Middle East at the time.

Until Nigerian Civil War, Nigeria and Turkey had very strong relations. This strong relationship became much weaker after the coup and Nigerian Civil War when Turkey took a position of neutrality in Nigerian Civil War and refused to sell arms to the federation. The relationship improved in the early 1990s through close cooperation in foreign policy.

The two countries cooperated during the Gulf crisis that began with Iraq's invasion of Kuwait in the summer of 1990. Both countries kept a low profile by being an active supporter of UN policy and declining to send troops to engage in the Persian Gulf.

== Presidential visits ==
| Guest | Host | Place of visit | Date of visit |
|---|---|---|---|
| (Turkey) President Abdullah Gül | (Nigeria) President Goodluck Jonathan | D-8 Summit, Abuja | July 2010 |
| (Nigeria) President Goodluck Jonathan | (Turkey) President Abdullah Gül | Çankaya Köşkü, Ankara | February 2011 |
| (Nigeria) President Goodluck Jonathan | (Turkey) President Recep Tayyip Erdoğan | Çankaya Köşkü, Ankara | January 8, 2015 |
| (Turkey) President Recep Tayyip Erdoğan | (Nigeria) President Muhammadu Buhari | Aso Villa, Abuja | March 1-3, 2016 |
| (Nigeria) President Muhammadu Buhari | (Turkey) President Recep Tayyip Erdoğan | Presidential Complex, Ankara | October 19, 2017 |

== Economic relations ==
- Trade volume between the two countries was US$726 million in 2019.
- There are direct flights from Istanbul to Abuja, Kano, Lagos and Port-Harcourt.

== See also ==
- Foreign relations of Nigeria
- Foreign relations of Turkey
