= High Commission of Nigeria, London =

City of Westminster, Greater London, SW1A and diplomatic mission of Nigeria

High Commission of Nigeria in London
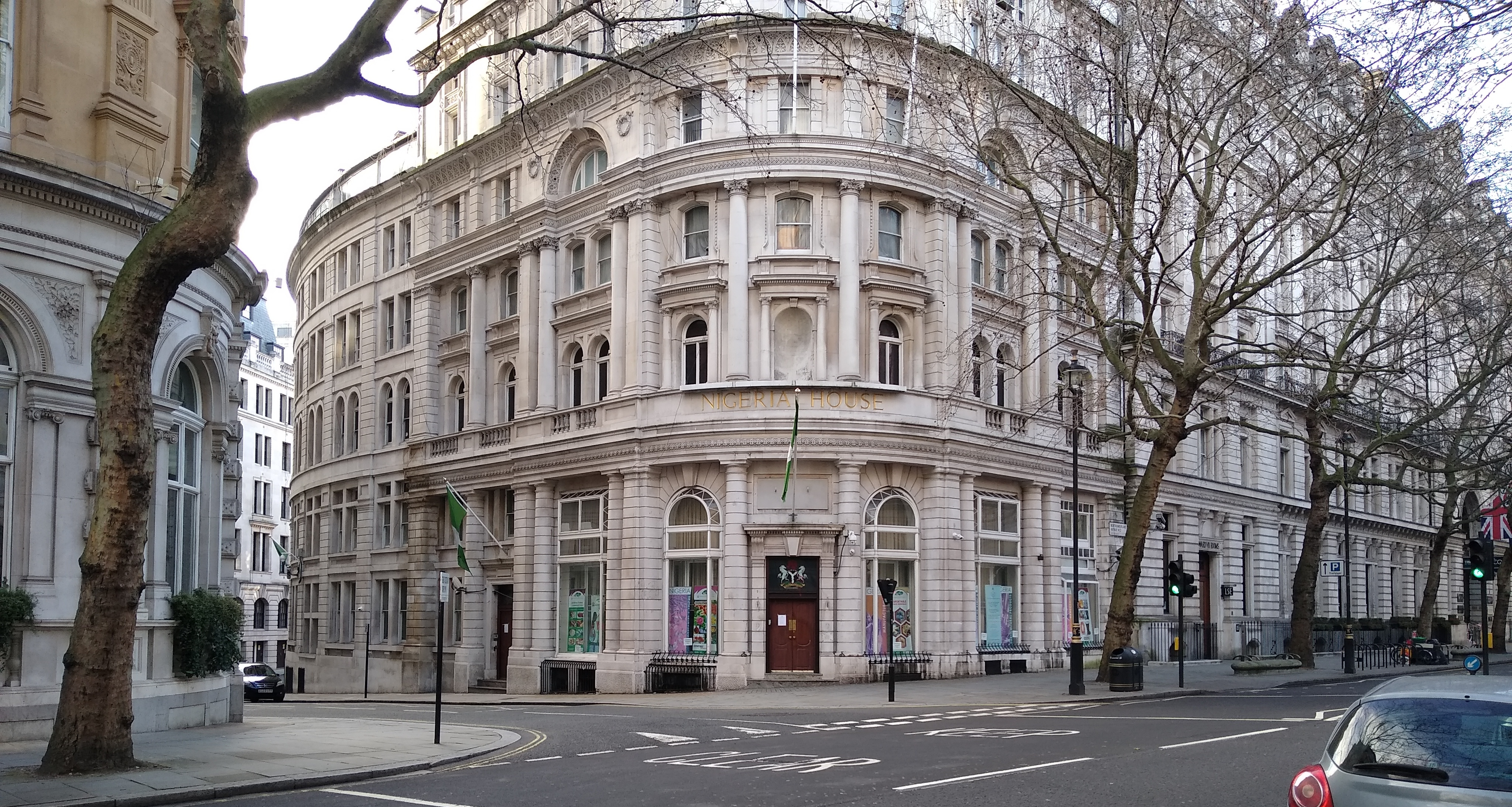
- Location: Westminster, London
- Address: 9 Northumberland Avenue, London, WC2N 5BX
- Coordinates: 51°30′24.8″N 0°7′30.9″W
- High Commissioner: Aminu Dalhatu

The High Commission of Nigeria in London is the diplomatic mission of Nigeria in the United Kingdom. The name of the role follows the Commonwealth practice of its members sharing high commissioners rather than ambassadors, though both jobs serve the same diplomatic function.

In 2012 a protest was held outside the High Commission by people opposed to the cut in fuel subsidies introduced by President Goodluck Jonathan.

The current High Commissioner is Ambassador Aminu Dalhatu.

In July 2024, Deputy Comptroller of Immigration Bashir Aminu, who heads the London office of Nigeria High Commission, was allegedly delaying issuance of passports to qualified Nigerians, and demanding for $318 for fast passport issuance. On 7 August 2024, seven days after a protest, Nigerian Immigration Service issued a statement denying the delay and surcharge by officials.

== Gallery ==
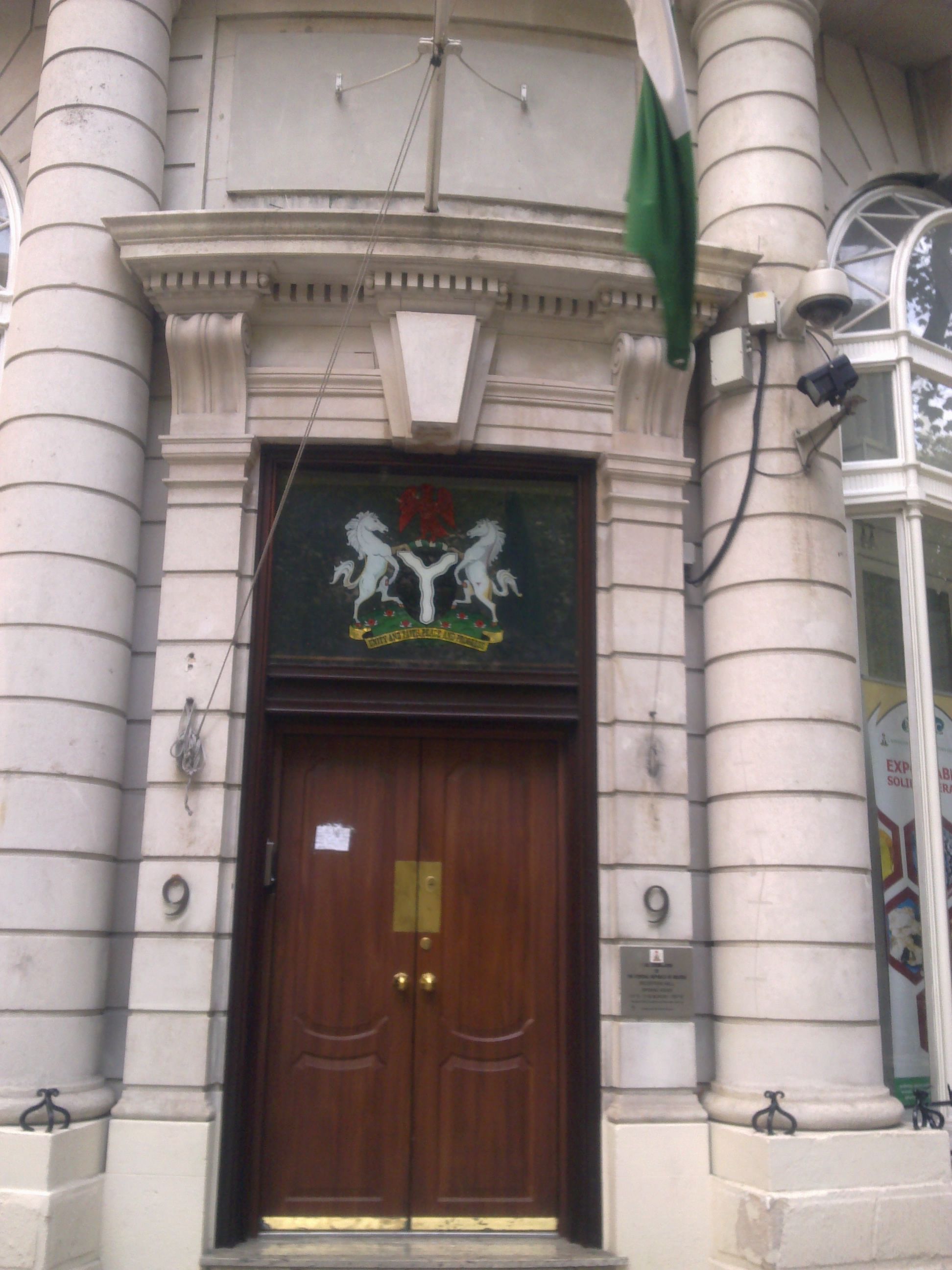
The Nigerian flag and coat of arms above the entrance

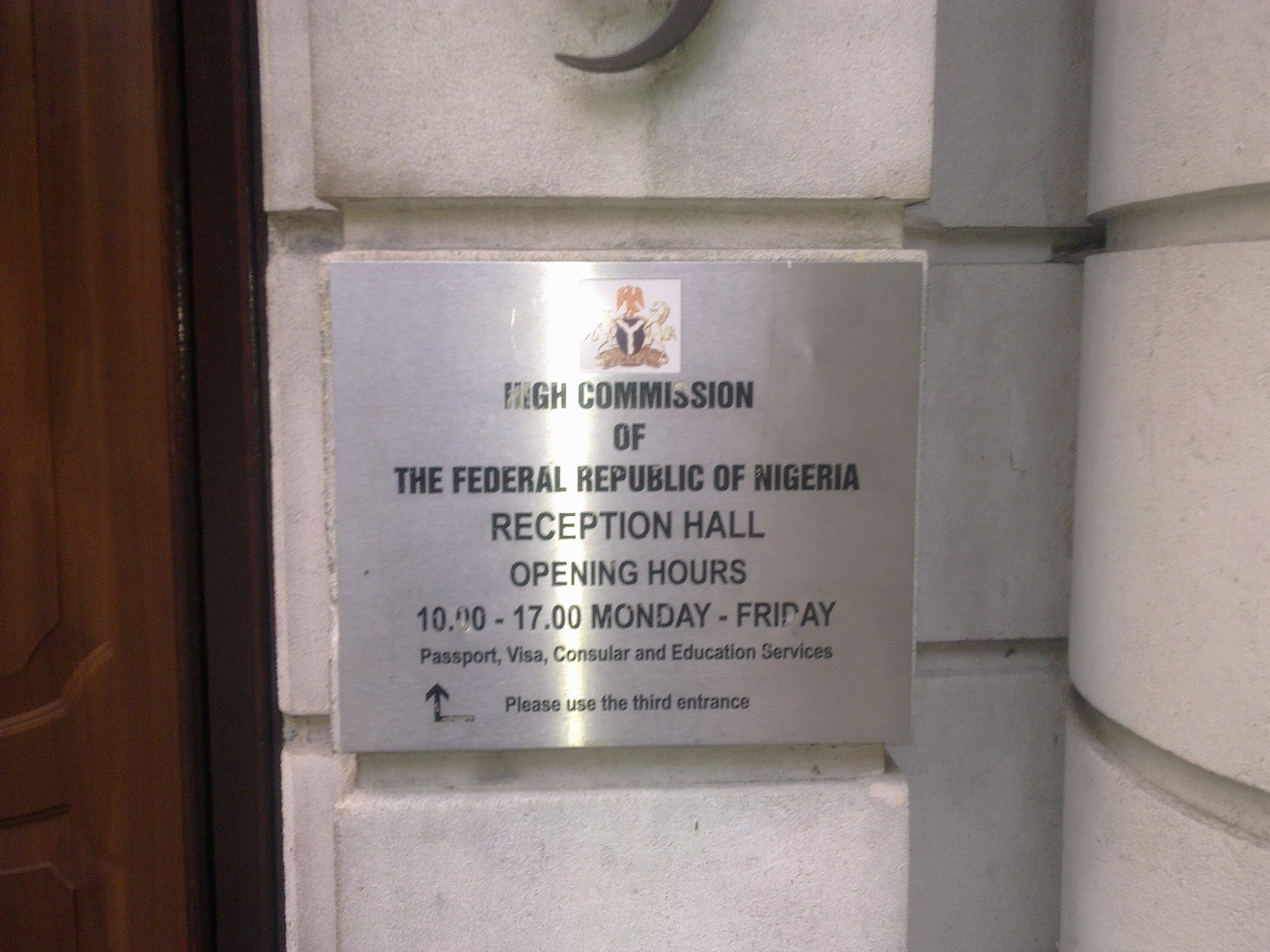
Plaque outside the High Commission
