= Kenya–Nigeria relations =

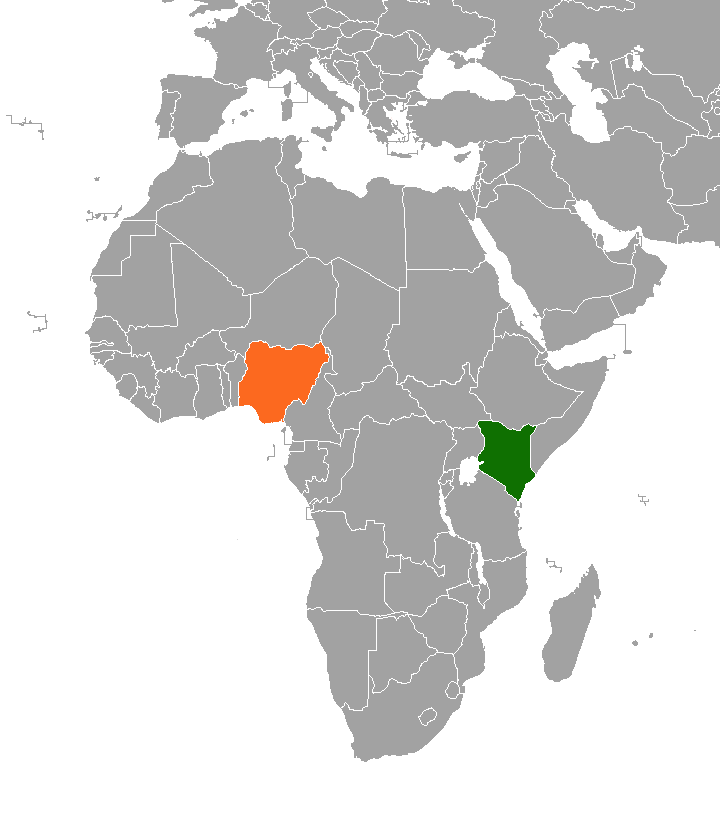

- Kenya: Nigeria

Kenya–Nigeria relations are bilateral relations between Nigeria and Kenya. Both countries are members of the Non-Aligned Movement, African Union and the Commonwealth of Nations.

== History ==
The two African nations officially established diplomatic relations on 28 May 1964. In 2013 Goodluck Jonathan made a highly publicized state visit to Nairobi. Uhuru Kenyatta reciprocated in 2014.

=== Agreements and MOUs ===
Kenya and Nigeria signed seven agreements that will boost bilateral and trade ties between the two countries. The agreements covered tourism, trade and investment; oil and gas, visa exemption for diplomatic passport holders; conclusion of agreements on double taxation; agriculture, livestock and fisheries; and twinning of cities.

Other deals include mutual cooperation between the Foreign Service Institute of Kenya and the Foreign Service Academy of Nigeria.

MoUs were also signed on cooperation in police service, five-year multiple visas for prominent businesspersons, cooperation in the control of the possession trafficking in narcotics drugs and psychotropic substances.

=== FDI ===
A notable number of Nigerian companies have operations in Kenya. Similarly, a significant number of Kenyan companies have operations in Nigeria.

== Trade ==
Kenyan exports to Nigeria fell to 33 million U.S. dollars in 2015 from 37 million dollars in 2008, according to the Kenya National Bureau of statistics.

Similarly, imports from Nigeria declined to a mere 555,000 dollars from 1.95 million dollars over the same period.

Following this period, Kenyan exports surged to 105 million U.S dollars in 2022 compared to 4.46 million dollars of Nigerian exports.

=== Re-exports ===
There are many products from Kenya in the Nigerian market. Goods such as flowers and, tea are bought from the UK. The Joint Business Council recommended that the two countries explore possibility of opening a direct channel of selling these products to Nigeria.

== Diplomatic missions ==
- Nigeria maintains a high commission in Nairobi.
- Kenya maintains a high commission in Abuja.
