= India–Nigeria relations =

- India: Nigeria

The Republic of India and the Federal Republic of Nigeria have built strategic and commercial ties. Both are members of the Commonwealth of Nations and the Non-Aligned Movement. India has a High Commission in Abuja and a Consulate in Lagos, and Nigeria has a High Commission in New Delhi. Indian business firms have invested estimated $15 billion in Nigeria. India is Nigeria's leading investor, with an investment base of about $20 billion. The figures on the amount of Nigeria's investment in India if any are not known.

== History ==
India gained independence in 1947; Nigeria followed and gained independence in 1960. India strongly supported independence of African countries from colonial rule and established its diplomatic mission in 1958 – two years before Nigeria officially gained independence from British rule. Soon after Nigerian independence, the Indian government got involved in helping establish a military and several other projects in Nigeria. India aided Nigeria in building military establishments like the Nigerian Defence Academy (NDA) at Kaduna and the Naval College at Port Harcourt, along with other military training facilities. A recent president of Nigeria, Muhammadu Buhari, attended the Defence Services Staff College in the 1970s. Other Nigerian presidents who attended the same college are Presidents Olusegun Obasanjo (1965) and Ibrahim Babangida (1964).Since 1964, India has been supporting Nigeria's efforts in capacity building under Indian Technical and Economic Cooperation (ITEC) Programme. India offers about 250 civilian and 250 defence training slots under ITEC/e-ITEC to Nigeria. Upon Nigeria gaining independence, Indian businesses set up shop in Nigeria.

== Economic relations ==
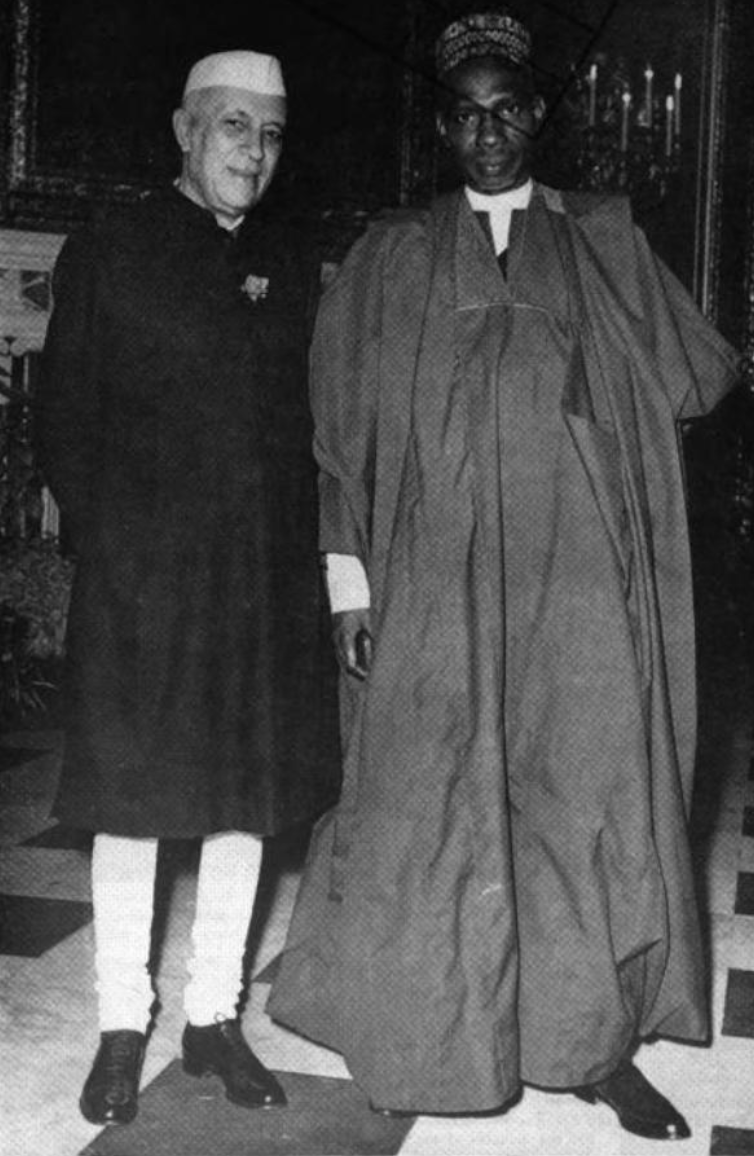
Abubakar Tafawa Balewa (R), 1st Prime Minister of Nigeria, with Pandit Jawaharlal Nehru (L), India's 1st Prime Minister (1962)

Both nations possess diverse natural and economic resources and are the largest economies in their respective regions. Currently, India's concessional line of credit to Africa is almost $9 billion, with present projects taking up $7.4 billion. India- Nigeria trade in 2018-19 amounted to US$13.89 billion. Despite the ever present threat of Nigerian terrorist organisations like the Boko Haram and the Black Axe mafia, Indian firms are the second biggest employers in Nigeria after the Nigerian Federal Government. More than 135 Indian firms operate in Nigeria. Indian firms in Nigeria are in greatly diverse fields e.g. pharmaceuticals, engineering goods, electrical machinery and equipment, plastics, chemicals, etc. Some of the major companies include Bharti Airtel, Tata, Bajaj Auto, Birla Group, Kirloskar, Mahindra, Ashok Leyland, Skipper, Godrej, Simba Group, NIIT, Aptech, New India Assurance, Bhushan Steel, KEC, Dabur, etc. Indian investment in Nigeria amounts to US$15 billion and rising according to the Indian High Commission in Abuja. Indian exports to Nigeria during the period 2018-19 were US$3 billion and India's imports from Nigeria during same period 2018-19 were worth US$10.88 billion. Nigeria was the fifth biggest seller of crude oil and third biggest seller of LNG after Qatar and UAE in year 2020 to India.In year 2020-2021 USA stood second after Iraq as the biggest seller of crude oil to India. Indian exports to Nigeria are Pharmaceuticals, automobiles, cars, iron and steel, rice, plastics, clothes and fabrics, engineering equipment, and power sector components such as transformers, insulators and circuit breaker etc. India is Nigeria's biggest trading partner in Africa, with trade volume of about $16.35 billion in year 2019–2020. India is Nigeria's leading investor, with an investment base of about $20 billion. India is the fifth largest investor in Africa with cumulative investment of US$70.7 billion. India is also the third largest trading partner of Africa after China and USA. India accounts for 6.4% of total African trade. Nigerian President Tinubu visited New Delhi in September 2023. During his visit Indian investors pledged another investment amounting to nearly $14 billion into the Nigerian economy. In Africa Nigeria is the third biggest trading partner of India in year 2024 after South Africa and Tanzania. Figures on the type and fields of Nigeria's investments into the Indian economy are unknown

=== Oil trade ===
India is the third largest oil consumer after USA and China and India is the second biggest importer of oil. India uses 5.5 million barrels of oil per day. India buys crude oil from Saudi Arabia, Iraq, Iran, Kuwait, Kazakhstan, Russia, and UAE with significantly reduced amount from Nigeria in 2021. In 2020–2021, USA took second place in India's oil imports with Iraq topping the list again. Since year 2018 India buys cheaper Basra Oil from Iraq and the crude oil purchased from West Africa including from Nigeria rank fifth in India's crude oil purchases annually. Russia was the biggest crude supplier to India in 2023, accounting for more than 30% of its oil imports.

== Cultural relations ==
=== Cinema ===
Bollywood movies have some popularity in Nigeria because of they show a different take on how developing societies can tackle societal themes. Zee World Africa has also offered easier African access to Indian entertainment.

== Indians in Nigeria ==
=== Hinduism ===
Hinduism spread to Nigeria mainly by the immigration of Hindus from India and of Hare Krishna Missionaries. Many Nigerians have converted to Hinduism mainly due to the efforts of ISKCON Missionaries. ISKCON has inaugurated the Vedic Welfare Complex in Apapa.

Altogether including Nigerians of Indian origin and NRIs there are 250,000 Hindus in Nigeria. Most of them live in Lagos, the former capital of Nigeria.

== See also ==
- Foreign relations of India
- Foreign relations of Nigeria
