= Germany–Sweden relations =

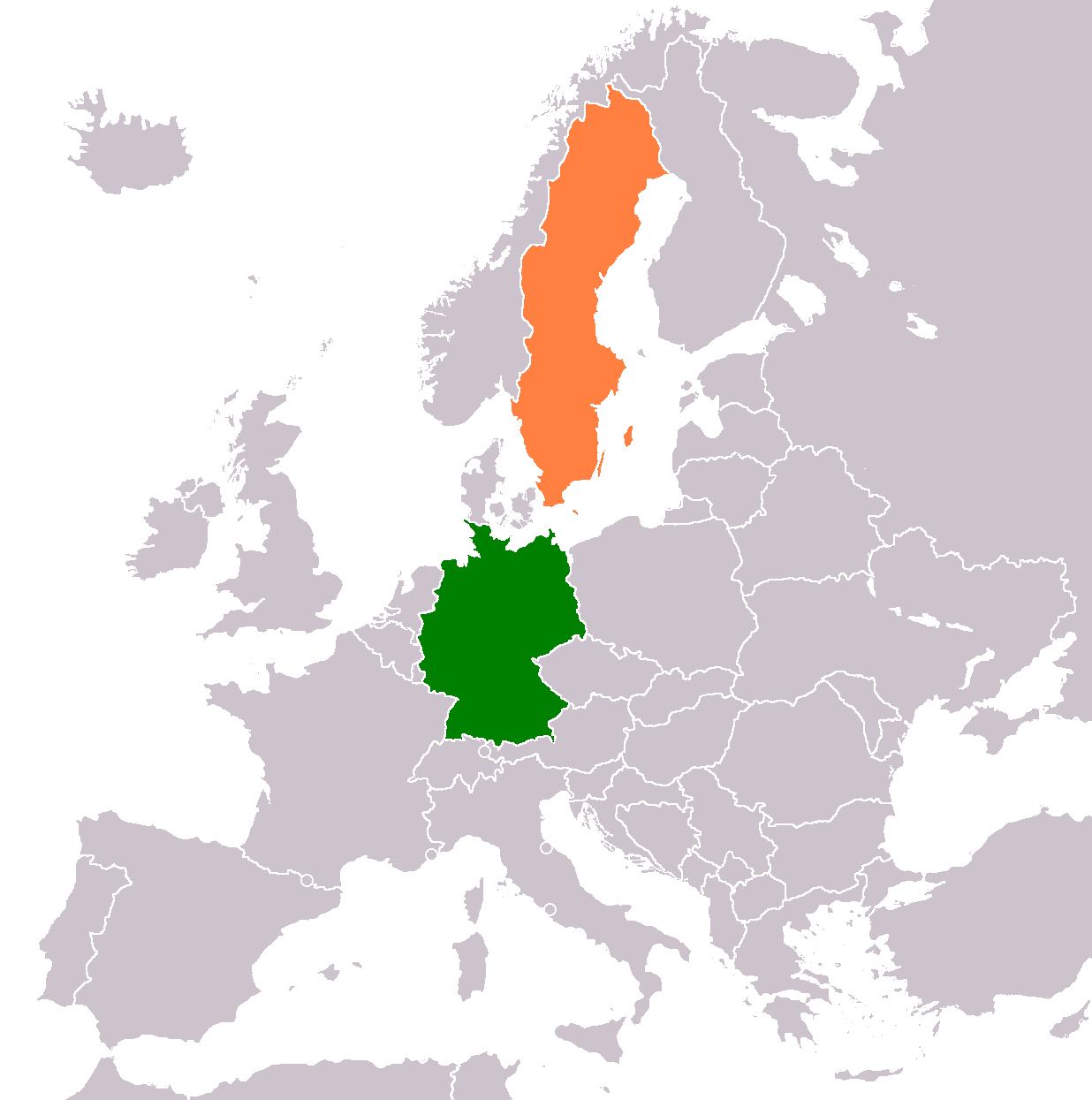

- Germany: Sweden

The relation between Germany and Sweden has a long historical background. The relationship is characterized by exchanges between the neighboring countries of the Baltic Sea in the 14th century. Both countries are members of the European Union, NATO, United Nations, OSCE, Council of the Baltic Sea States and the Council of Europe. Germany has given full support to Sweden's membership of the European Union. Germany strongly supported Sweden's NATO membership during the latter's accession process. Germany has an embassy in Stockholm. Sweden has an embassy in Berlin.

== History ==
=== Early history ===
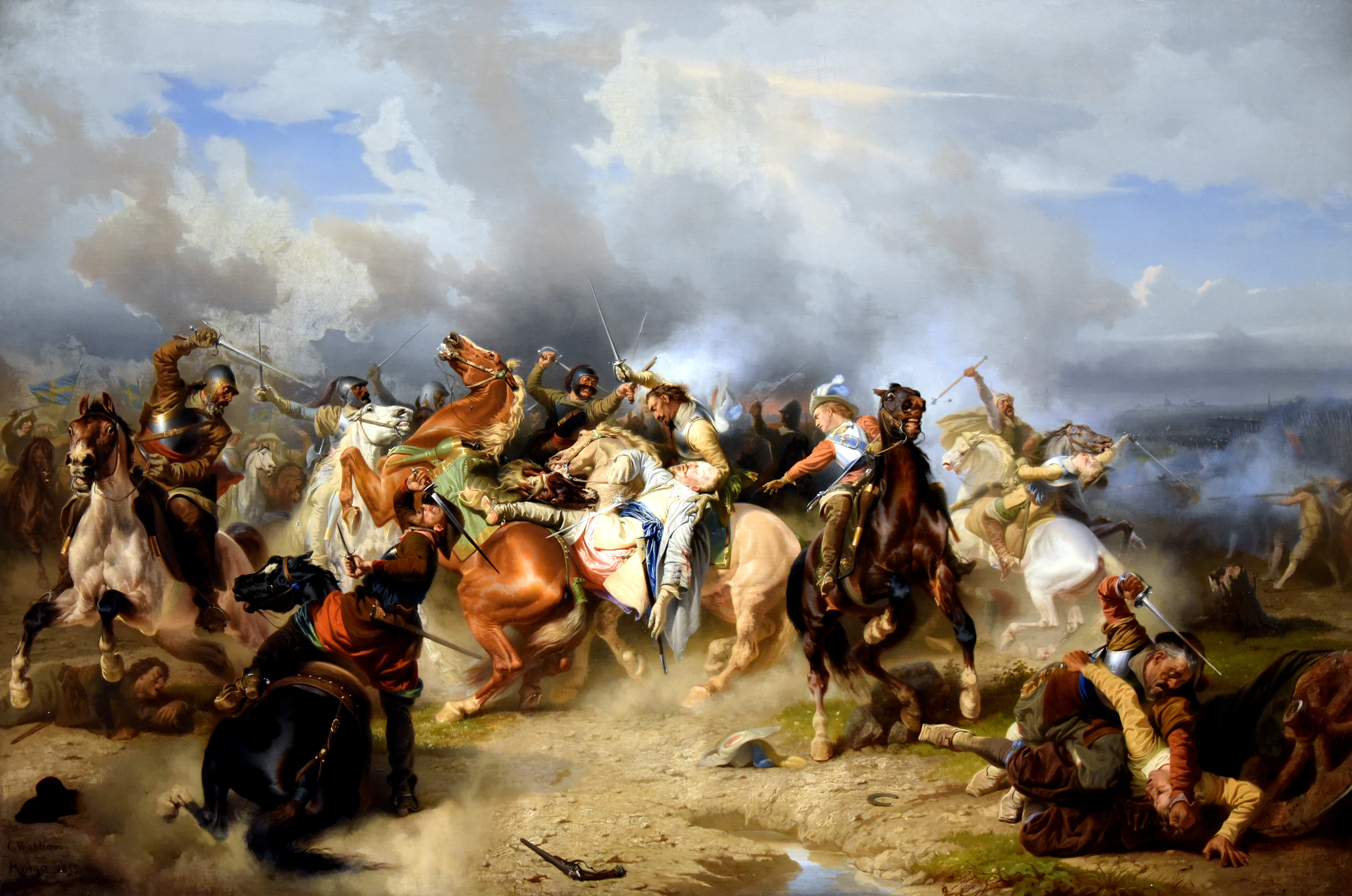
Death of Gustavus II Adolphus at the Battle of Lützen, 1855 painting by Carl Wahlbom

Both what is now Germany and Sweden were settled by Proto-Germanic peoples. The Ahrensburg culture, named after the town of Ahrensburg in the German state of Schleswig-Holstein, originated mostly in the North German Plain and were the first known peoples to settle modern-day Sweden. By the 2nd century AD, Proto-Norse evolved from Proto-Germanic in Scandinavia. This separated the West Germanic (of whom Germans are associated) and the North Germanic peoples (of whom the Swedes are associated).

German-Swedish contacts date back to the Middle Ages, and the relations were marked by multiple conflicts and wars. In 1398, the Teutonic Order invaded and occupied the island of Gotland, with another war fought for the island between the Kalmar Union and the Teutonic Order in 1403–1404. In 1570 German mercenaries unsuccessfully revolted against Sweden in then Swedish-ruled Reval (modern Tallinn, Estonia).

Most notably, Sweden took part in the Thirty Years' War, which was mostly fought in the Holy Roman Empire. Sweden's involvement in the war weakened Imperial authority and delayed the unification of German states, which occurred only in the 19th century. Since 1648 Sweden ruled various territories of modern northern Germany, i.e. Bremen-Verden, Wismar and Hither Pomerania.

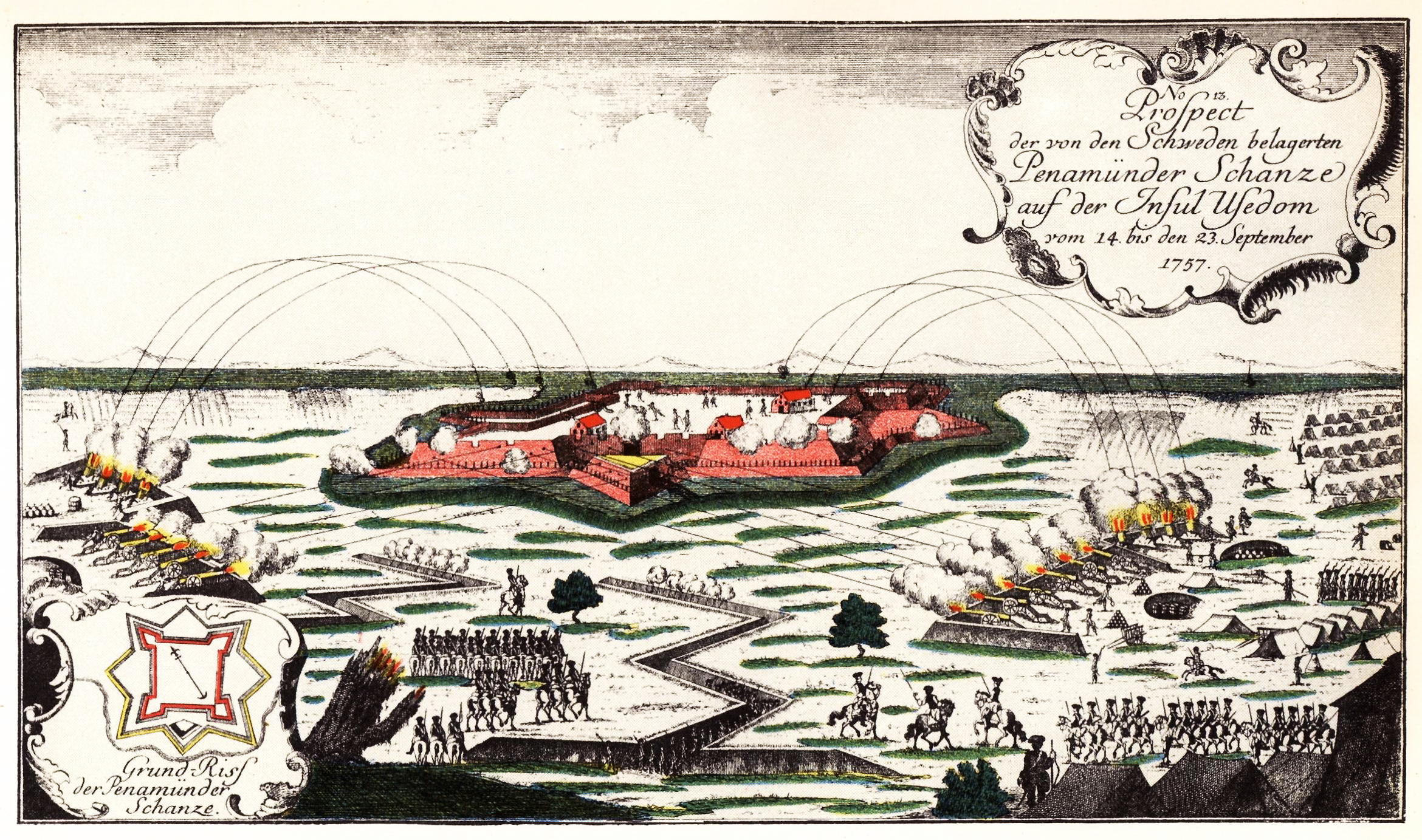
Swedish siege of Prussian-controlled Peenemünde during the Pomeranian War in 1757

During the Great Northern War of 1700–1721 Sweden lost Bremen-Verden and part of Pomerania to Hanover and Prussia, respectively. In 1757–1762, Sweden and Prussia clashed in the Pomeranian War for the control of Pomerania, however, the war ended with no territorial changes. In the early 19th century, Sweden lost Wismar and the remainder of Hither Pomerania to the Duchy of Mecklenburg-Schwerin and Prussia, respectively, although Sweden renounced its claims to Wismar only in 1903.

=== World Wars and interwar period ===
During the First World War (1914–1918), though Sweden would remain officially neutral throughout the conflict, widespread sympathies existed towards Imperial Germany amongst the Swedish population, especially within the nobility, including the King. Though Sweden traded with both sides during the war, the Germans disproportionally benefitted from trade with Sweden due to the shortages brought about by the British blockade. In particular, Sweden became a crucial source of iron ore for Germany. Sweden's perceived partiality towards the Central Powers despite her proclaimed neutrality drew sharp criticism from the Allied Entente. The 1914 Septemberprogramm authorized by German Chancellor Theobald von Bethmann Hollweg proposed the creation of a Central European Economic Union, comprising a number of European countries, including Germany and possibly Sweden, in which, as the Chancellor secretly stressed, there was to be a semblance of equality among the member states, but in fact it was to be under German leadership to stabilize Germany's economic predominance in Central Europe, with co-author Kurt Riezler admitting that the union would be a veiled form of German domination in Europe (see also: Mitteleuropa). The plan failed amid Germany's defeat in the war.

In the times of the Weimar Republic (1918–1933) Sweden was economically dependent on Germany. One of the important customer countries of Sweden in terms of iron ore was Germany. Moreover, a lot of German large companies acquired significant stock options of Swedish companies. In 1926 the trade and shipping treaty between the two countries was cancelled by Germany, because of disadvantages for German agrarian economy. In Sweden, the reorientation from German to Anglo-American culture had begun after the First World War. But still the upper classes of Sweden derived their culture and inspiration from the German universities, conservatories and art centers. In the interwar period the Swedish import of German literature had an important role. The domestic political development of Germany, especially the rapid increase of the influence of National Socialism in the German policy after 1930, was observed with big interest by Sweden. The Swedish press adopted a distanced and critical attitude towards National Socialism which caused disgruntlements between the German-Swedish relations. While Germany was influenced by National Socialism, Sweden was a country with a social democratic government.

In autumn 1932, Hermann Göring, the president of the Reichstag at that time, complained to Karl Albert Damgren, the press responsible of the Swedish delegation, in Berlin about the style of the reporting in the Swedish press in relation to National Socialism. The Nazi seizure of power on 30 January 1933 created problems between Germany and Sweden. Frederic Hans von Rosenberg complained about a Swedish article in the "Social-Demokraten". He said that the article contained wrong and exaggerated information. But Sweden was also attacked by the German press.

In the years that followed (1934–1937), the Swedish-German relations occurred a quiet phase. The German government circles expressed their interest in friendly contact with Sweden. Sweden declared in the Second World War again its neutrality. But Arvid Richert, the Swedish envoy in Berlin expressed his apprehension that Sweden could be involved in the war. He advised Sweden that they had to show resistance and attention in relation to statements about Germany to protect their country.

=== Post-war period ===
The post war period of Sweden was characterized by continuity. From Sweden's point of view there was no need for analyzing of their behavior during the National Socialism. It did not need a construction of parliamentary democracy or a constitutional reform. But one of Sweden's strategies after the war was the rejection of all things which was associated with National Socialism. Thus militaristically and nationalistically currents were opposed and Anglo-American values of modernity and rationality were benefited.

In July 2022, Germany fully approved Sweden's application for NATO membership.

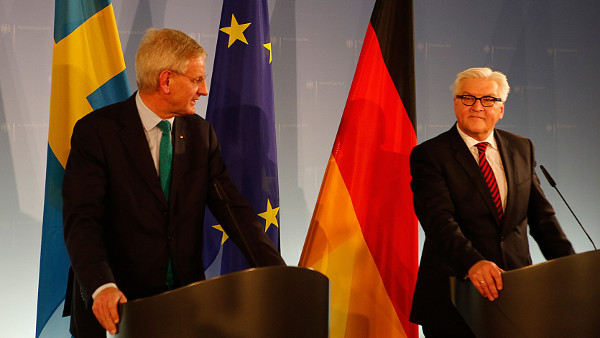
Meeting of Carl Bildt and Frank-Walter Steinmeier, foreign ministers of Sweden and Germany, in 2014.

== High level visits ==
In 1979, King Carl XVI Gustaf and his wife Queen Silvia made an official state visit to Germany, the visit focused on strengthening bilateral relations and economic cooperation.

In 2012, Fredrik Reinfeldt was a guest of Chancellor Angela Merkel. In May 2012 the German federal president Gauck visited Sweden at his trip. At autumn 2012 the federal ministers Wolfgang Schäuble and Thomas de Maizière went to Sweden, and in January 2017, Chancellor Angela Merkel visited Prime Minister Stefan Löfven.

On 4 May 2012, German President Joachim Wilhelm Gauck and Daniela Schadt participated in the 400th anniversary of the German School in Stockholm, established in 1612 and it's the second oldest German school abroad which reflected cultural and educational strong ties between the two countries.

German President Frank Walter Steinmeier made a state visit to Sweden in 2021, and it was the first visit hosted by Sweden since the outbreak of Covid-19.

== Economic relations ==
On the one hand the main supplier country of Sweden is Germany. The amount of Sweden's imports from Germany is about 17.3 percent, from Norway about 8.7 percent and from Denmark about 8.4 percent. On the other hand, one of the main customer countries of Sweden is Germany. Sweden exports most of their products to Norway. But Germany is with an amount of 9.8 percent in the lead of Sweden's customer countries. In year 2012 Germany imported goods from Sweden in the amount of 13 billion Euros. Among the products which Sweden exports to Germany are pharmaceutical products (18.2%), paper and paperboard (18.3%), metals (12.5%), machines (8.8%), automobiles and automobile particles (7.7%), mineral ores (6.3%) and chemical products (4.6%). 18.2 percent of the total German exports to Sweden are automobiles and automobile particles, 14.5 percent machines, 9.5 percent EDP-appliances, 8.5 percent chemical products, 7.7 percent electrical equipment and 6.5 percent metals.

The stock of the foreign direct investments of Sweden in Germany was around 15.243 Million Euros in year 2009, around 16.146 million Euros in year 2010 and around 16.183 Million Euros in year 2011. The stock of German foreign direct investments in Sweden was higher. The stock was around 16.336 million Euros in year 2009, around 20.096 million Euros in year 2010 and around 26.027 million Euros in year 2011. The number of the engagement of German companies in Sweden is about 870, with about 50.000 employees and estimated annual sales around 30 milliard euros. Regional focus areas are Stockholm, Göteborg and Malmö.

== Social policy ==
Principally Germany has deep interest in socio-political achievements and developments in Sweden. The sections child care, family policy and also the commerce with handicapped person are at the top of interest. Bilateral relations could be registered in the sections labor market reform, professional training and nursing care insurance. Right-wing populism has emerged in both countries.

== Cultural relations ==
Until the Second World War, Sweden along with the rest of the Nordic countries and the Low Countries was geared to the German linguistic and cultural area and was considered to fall under the "German sphere of influence". After the war a rapid reorientation followed to the Anglo-American area. The German language has been replaced by English as the second language, though it still retains its position as the second most popular foreign language for school students. Besides Goethe-Institut and Deutsche Schule Stockholm, further partner schools are of concern for the support of the German language in Sweden.

German film productions are quite successful in Swedish cinemas and on Swedish television, but historical topics are more in the foreground. German ensembles and artist are going regularly to Sweden because of theatrical performances. In the literariness, a high demand exists for German classics. There are from time to time articles in the Swedish press about life in Germany, especially in Berlin.

In the German city of Wismar in Mecklenburg-Vorpommern, the Schwedenfest ("Swedish Festival"), the largest Swedish festival outside of Sweden, takes place once a year.

== German institutions, associations and projects in Sweden ==
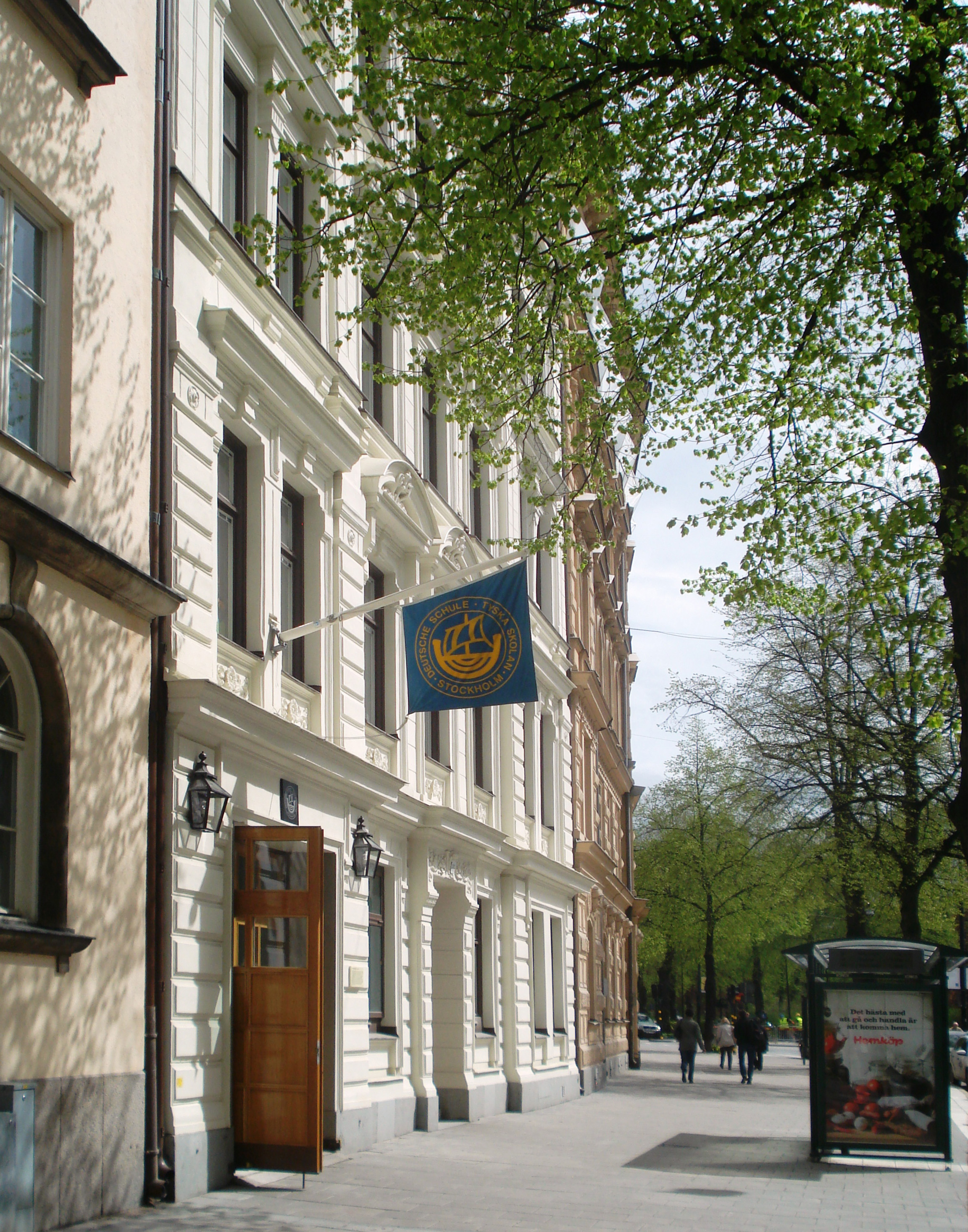
Deutsche Schule Stockholm, Eingangstor Karlavägen 25

- Embassy of Germany, Stockholm
- Goethe-Institut Stockholm
- German-Swedish Chamber of Commerce
- Germany Trade and Invest GmbH (GTAI)
- German National Tourist Board (Deutsche Zentrale für Tourismus e.V., Tyska Turistbyrån AB)
- Deutsche Schule Stockholm
- Deutsche Schule Göteborg
- German Church, Stockholm (St. Gertrude's Church)
- German Church, Gothenburg (Christina Church)
- German Church, Malmö
- ARD German Radio & TV
- Friedrich Ebert Foundation
- German Wine Institute
- Deutsche Vereinigung Stockholm
- Svensk-Tyska Föreningen
- Deutscher Damenklub
- Deutscher Hilfsverein
- Deutsche Gesellschaft Stockholm

== Swedish institutions, associations and projects in Germany ==
- Embassy of Sweden, Berlin
- Swedish Chamber of Commerce
- Swedish Club in Hamburg

== Diaspora ==
About 50,000 Swedes live in Germany Svensker, and about 20,000 Germans live in Sweden.

== Resident diplomatic missions ==
- Germany has an embassy in Stockholm.
- Sweden has an embassy in Berlin.
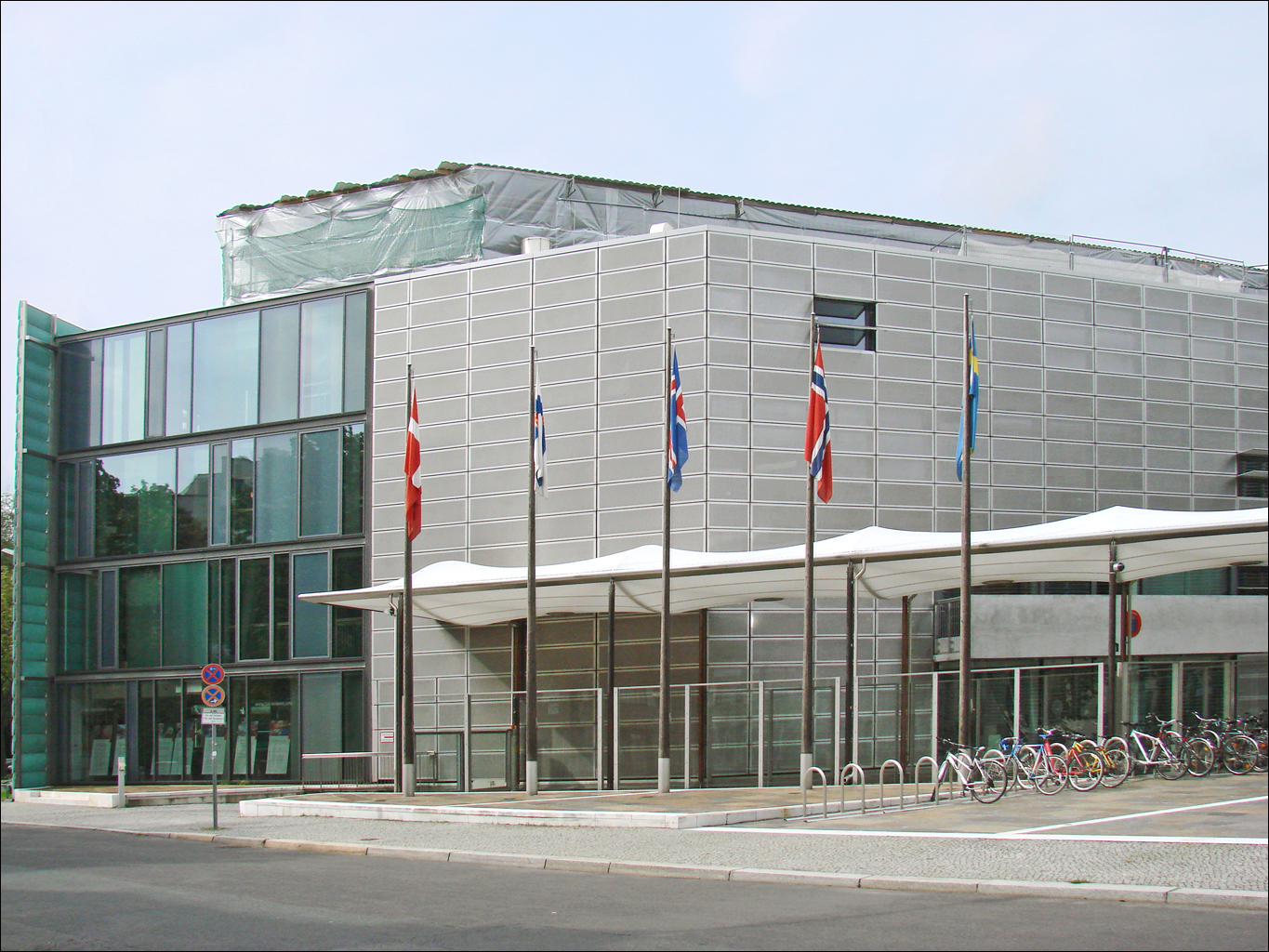
Embassy of Sweden in Berlin

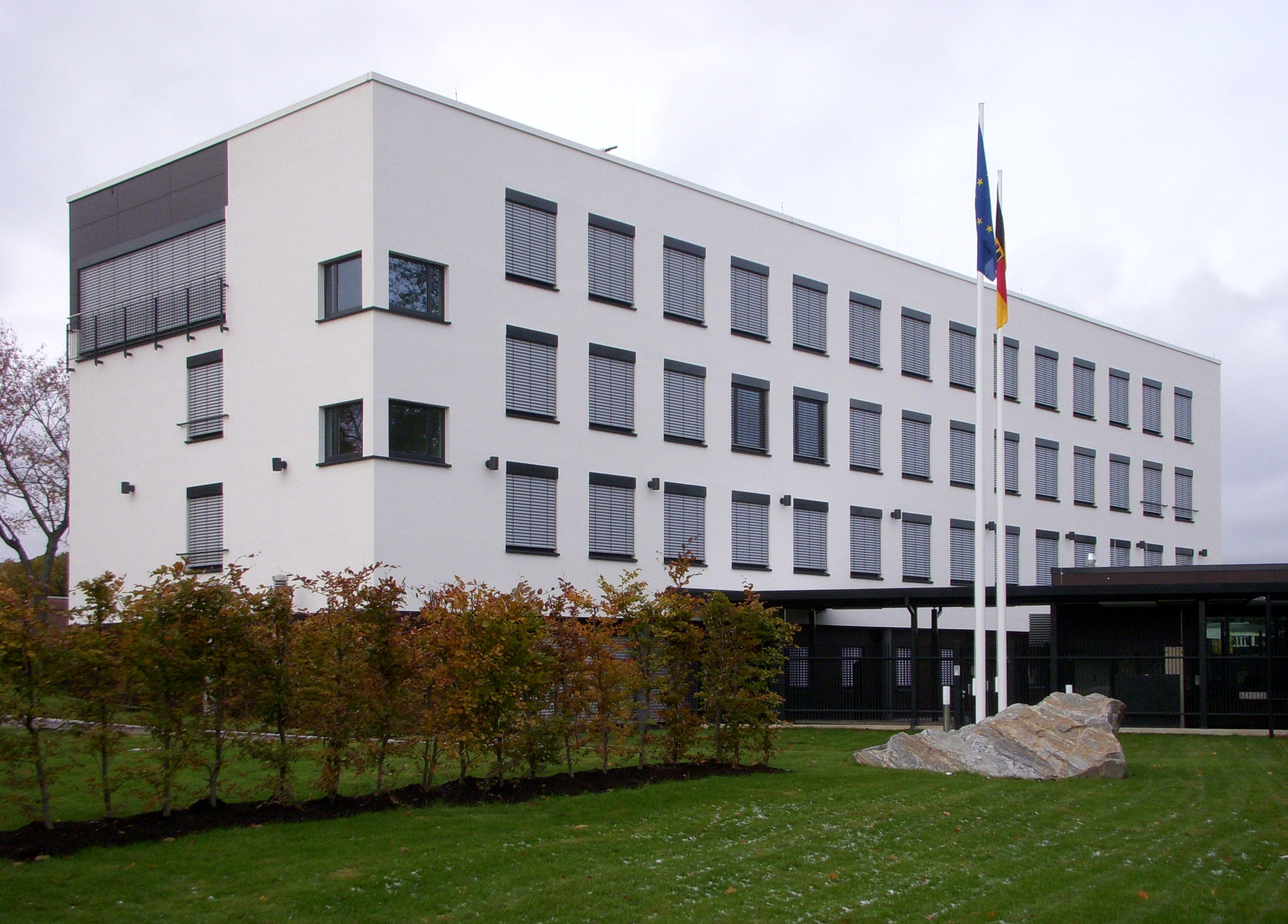
Embassy of Germany in Stockholm

== See also ==
- Foreign relations of Germany
- Foreign relations of Sweden
- Wismar affair
