= Johann Balthasar Schupp =

German writer and academic

Johann Balthasar Schupp Johannes Balthasarus Schuppius
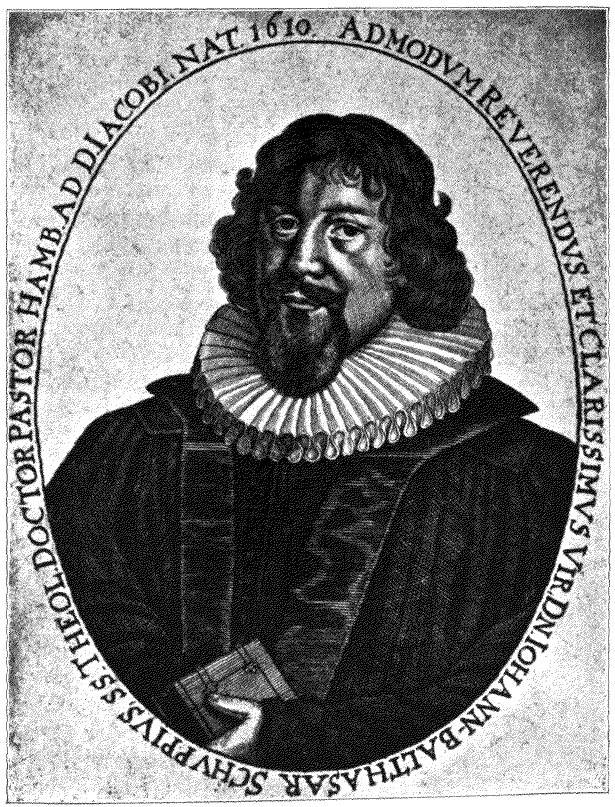
- Born: 1 March 1610; Giessen, Hesse-Darmstadt, Germany
- Died: 26 October 1661 (aged 51); Hamburg, Germany
- Other names: Antenor, Philandron, Ehrnhold, Philanderson, Mellilambius and Ambrosius and other author pseudonyms
- Occupations: Writer; Satirist; Hymn writer University teacher and administrator Historian and Rhetorician; Theologian; Lutheran minister-preacher Diplomat
- Spouse(s): 1. Anna Elisabeth Helwig (1617–1650); 2. Sophia Eleonora Reinkingk
- Children: Anton Meno Schupp (1637-1703) and at least 3 more
- Parent(s): Johann Eberhart (Ebert) Schupp (?–1646); Anna Elisabeth Ruß

Johann Balthasar Schupp (1 March 1610 – 26 October 1661) was a German satirical author and a writer of Christian lyrics. After 1654, his having switched mid-career to a position as a high-profile Lutheran pastor, the content and populist approach of Schupp's sermons and of the printed pamphlets which he now started to publish brought him into increasingly acrimonious conflict with Hamburg's (relatively) conservative church establishment.

Much of his later written work appeared under a succession of pseudonyms. These included Antenor, Philandron, Ehrnhold, Philanderson, Mellilambius and Ambrosius.

== Life ==
=== Provenance and early years ===
Johann Balthasar Schupp was born in Giessen, the eldest recorded child of a prosperous middle class couple. He was baptised as a Protestant on 29 March 1610, but the baptismal record did not mention his birth date. The birth date of 1 March 1610 is widely applied in secondary sources, but no original record of it is traceable. Johann Eberhart (Ebert) Schupp, his father, was a local businessman and town councillor who twice, in 1630 and again in 1640, served terms as mayor. His mother, born Anna Elisabeth Ruß, came from a patrician family: her father, Johannes Ruß, had also, in 1601 and 1613, served as mayor. Balthasar Schupp had five younger siblings.

=== Studies and Wanderjahre ===
Schupp attended the Pädagogium (school) in Giessen till the end of 1625 when, on 29 December, he enrolled at the already well established University of Marburg, some 25 miles to the north. (The universities of Giessen and Marburg were at this time administered as a single entity.) He studied Philosophy and Theology. In 1628 he undertook a lengthy tour educational through southern Germany and the Baltic coastal region (Note: English language sources: Baltic Sea German language sources: Ostsee / East Sea.) According to one source his travels also took in Latvia, Lithuania and Poland, extending also to Copenhagen and Königsberg. On a number of occasions he was obliged to change his travel plans at short notice, reacting to the dangers presented by the marauding armies and the accompanying plague epidemics that were a constant feature of the on-going war. Scholars encountered during these Wanderjahre who exercised a particular influence on Schupp's later career included the noted professor of eloquence, Samuel Fuchs, at Königsberg, the Rostock theologian Johann Cothmann, the Rostock legal scholar Thomas Lindemann and, perhaps most importantly, the academic poet-polymath Peter Lauremberg. Schupp evidently lodged with Lauremberg at Rostock during 1630/31. It was also Lauremberg who supervised him for the magister degree which he received from the University of Rostock on 18 August 1631. He was especially proud that the university had ranked him at the top of degree list.

=== Itinerant scholar ===
Still in Rostock, he immediately began to work as a tutor (Privatdozent). However, on 15 October 1631 the imperial garrison left Rostock, ushering in what came to be known as the "Swedish times". The city was now controlled from Mecklenburg by Swedish forces directed by Gustavus Adolphus. In the event, Rostock suffered less under occupation than many other regional centres, although trade was badly disrupted. Later during October 1631 Schupp had nevertheless left town, moving via Lübeck to Hamburg and then to Bremen. By 1632, after an absence of perhaps three years, he was back home in Giessen. The military-political situation locally was relatively quiet, and during 1632 he received permission from the young Landgraf to lecture at Marburg. At the same time he was appointed director and, between 1632 and 1634, head stipendiate ("Stipendiatenmajor") at Marburg's "collegium und exercitium oratorium". Here he may have been imprudently generous with his political views, since in December 1632, following the Landgraf's personal intervention, he was formally and firmly admonished by Johann Heinrich Tonsor, a senior professor at the university. He should restrict himself to subjects that fell within the existing scope of his students' understanding: he must take care to avoid any questions that might prejudice the standing of the imperial authorities, or touch on the causes and disputes of the war.

After the university was cleared by plague Schupp returned once more to Giessen where during 1633/34 he taught Rhetoric. Sources differ as to whether it was dissatisfaction with the teaching work in Giessen or the continuing twin impacts of plague and war in Hesse-Darmstadt that drove him, during 1634/35, to team up with the young aristocrat Rudolf Rau von Holzhausen and leave the area and embark on what in effect became a second period as an itinerant scholar, moving first to Cologne and then to what was known at the time as the "Zuiderkwartier" (South Holland). Identified in records as the companion Rau von Holzhausen, on 3 June 1634 Johannes Balthasarus Schuppius enrolled at the University of Leiden. In the Dutch Republic Schupp resumed his teaching career. He was also able to network with some of the leading international scholars of the day, including the classicist Claudius Salmasius and the remarkable philologist Marcus Zuerius van Boxhorn. The man described in a number of sources as the greatest scholar of his generation, Daniel Heinsius, nevertheless refused even to meet Schupp. Having noticed the similarity (especially in Latin) between Schupp's family name and that of the Catholic controversialist Caspar Schoppe (who by now had relocated permanently south to Rome, Heinsius insisted that Schoppe and Schupp must be cousins., during which time he made the acquaintance of the well-travelled theologian Gerardus Vossius and of the polymath-humanist Caspar Barlaeus. Although he was impressed by these and by many other eminent academic gentlemen whom he met during his time accompanying Rudolf Rau von Holzhausenin the Dutch Republic, of greater significance was his appreciation at close hand of the mutual tolerance apparent in the relationship between church and state. He himself later attributed his liberal approach to church-state relations to his Dutch experiences. The religious toleration upon which visitors to the Dutch Republic frequently commented during the so-called "Dutch Golden Age" was particularly striking after his earlier travels across various parts of the Holy Roman empire in which the more conservative precept "Cuius regio, eius religio" was seldom challenged.

=== Tenure ===
At the end of 1635, after approximately another year away, he returned again to Marburg. By now, still aged only 25, he believed himself well prepared to take up a position as a university theologian. The university authorities had other ideas, however, which Schupp was in no position to counter. Professor Theodor Höpingk had just vacated Marburg in order to take up a position as Syndic in Friedberg (near Frankfurt, leaving Marburg with a vacancy for a professor of Eloquence and History. Johann Balthasar Schupp accepted the Marburg professorship in Eloquence and History, retaining the post till 1646. Sources recall that he took a personal interest in his students, and displayed a talent for relating to them, delivering his lectures with flair and liveliness, while shunning academic stiffness and pedantry. He was accordingly able to generate a certain level academic zeal, along with a mutually fulfilling relationship that benefited teacher and students alike.

=== Marriages ===
On 9 May 1636 Johann Balthasar Schupp married Anna Elisabeth Helwig. As the only (recorded) daughter of the polymath-philologist Christoph Helvig, she came from another academic family in the region. Her father had died in 1617, however. The marriage was a happy one. After the death of his first wife in 1650 he married, secondly, Sophia Eleonora Reinkingk in 1651. By each of his marriages Balthasar Schupp was father to at least one son and one daughter. According to at least one source, however, his marriages resulted in the births not of four but of five recorded children.

=== Academic progression ===
In 1638 Schupp organised the republication of his father-in-law's book "Theatrum historicum et chronologicum", which remained a useful tool for history teaching. The books lasting relevance is evident from the fact that further reprints were still being issued in the eighteenth century. His own didactic approach of abandoning pedantic tradition in favour of a more lucid eloquence effectively heralded a new technique and methodology that would win lasting approval, even though at this stage neither Schupp nor anyone else of influence in the universities establishment took the next obvious step of teaching the topic of "Eloquence" in the vernacular rather than in Latin.

By this time, in addition to his teaching duties at the university, Schupp was providing private lessons in Oratory at "Avellin", his summer holiday-home in the countryside outside Marburg.

One surviving indication of the affection and esteem in which he was held by colleagues is a letter dated 12 December 1638 addressed by the entire university to Landgraf Georg II, urging that Schupp's meagre annual salary of 140 gulden should be increased. The letter describes Schupp as a "rarum ingenium" (loosely, "a rare talent"). The Landgraf's reply, dated 17 January 1639, indicates that he will supplement the university salary with a personal annual grant of 100 gulden, effective retrospectively from 1 January 1639. In addition the Landgraf proposes a one-time payment of 50 gulden as acknowledgment of the low level of Schupp's remuneration during the earlier years. Both the letters involved in this remunerative exchange pay fulsome tribute to the young professor's hard work and enthusiasm.

=== Royal commission ===
Having been alerted to the excellence of the Professor of History and Eloquence at his university in Marburg, in 1640 the Landgraf commissioned Schupp to write a large Latin-language work of history. It was to be a history of the government of Landgraf Georg and of his father, the Landgraf Ludwig, who had died in 1626. The period in question was an eventful one, coinciding with the outbreak and more than two decades of the Thirty Years' War. There was self-evidently a tension between the Landgraf's commission and the agreed need for Schupp to continue his public teaching and ensure that students should continue with the opportunity to study History and Eloquence. A letter from 29 September 1641 to the university authorities spells out the conflicting objectives and hints at some sort of ill-defined scaling back of the university teaching, and a subsequent letter addressed to Schupp himself and dated 29 October 1641 undertaking to provide supplementary "princely recompense" in the form of 12 Klafter (roughly 20 meters) of timber and two sows annually. That would surely have been enough to keep the growing Schupp family warm through the winter and well provided with meat through the year. The book was almost certainly never completed, but something of its likely tone and content can be inferred from the text of a speech that Schupp delivered in 1638 in which he warmly eulogised the Landgraf, but also vividly described the horrors of the on-going war. The text survives because in 1640 it was printed and published as a short (16 page) booklet, dedicated to Landgraf Georg, and made available under the title "Hercules togatus" (loosely, "Citizen Hercules").

Reasons for the non-appearance of the ambitious history book included the acute politico-military and economic pressures of the time. Throughout the 1630s plague and war ravaged the area. Sometimes the basic necessities of life were unavailable in Marburg. Schupp was forced by plague to leave the city on a number of occasions. Along with the challenges inherent in the Landgraf's commission, there were times when he was required to add administrative deanery duties to his job portfolio, and on one occasion he also found himself serving as a university Prorector throughout virtually the whole of 1643. By the end of the decade he was nevertheless finding opportunities to turn his attentions from the Philosophy faculty (which under the conventions of the time incorporated a wide range of topics including History and Eloquence) and towards the Theology faculty, thus fulfilling some of those ambitions with which he had returned from Leiden back in 1635.

=== Theologian and hymnist ===
In August 1641 Schupp was awarded a university licentiate in Theology.

After the death of Johannes Steuber in 1643 the relevant official appointed Schupp to succeed him as the minister-preacher ("Prediger") at the Elisabethkirche (Church of St.Elisabeth). He combined the office with his continuing academic duties at the university. Two years later, in 1645, he received from the university his doctorate in Theology: correspondence indicates that it was now intended and assumed both by the Landgraf and by Schupp that he would have the time to conclude his tome on the recent history of Hesse-Darmstadt.

Schupp's first compilation of religious songs (hymns) was published at Marburg in 1643. The volume, entitled "Passion und Buß, auch Trost-, Bitt- und Danklieder" (loosely, "Passion, repentance and consolation: songs of requests and thanks"), contained the lyrics for ten hymns. A second volume, entitled "Morgen- und Abendlieder" (Morning and Evening songs), made its first appearanance probably in the same year. The two volumes were aggregated into a single volume of fourteen hymns and re-printed in Hamburg in 1655. Some of the hymns reappeared in the 1666 edition of the Praxis Pietatis (German-language hymn book) produced in Frankfurt: some were reproduced in locally compiled and printed "community hymnals". Schupp's hymn lyrics no doubt served their purpose for seventeenth century Lutherans, but they were essentially "of their time". During later centuries they have been overlooked: they evince no enduring poetic merit.

=== Swedish intervention ===
Heavy fighting in the area during 1645 culminated in the occupation of Marburg by Swedish troops on 2 November 1645. Balthasar Schupp lost his papers and his home through the plundering of the city that followed. He even lost his holiday-home in the countryside beyond the city: it was burnt down. He lost everything. It is not surprising, under the circumstances, that in December 1645 Schupp accepted an invitation from Landgraf Johann of Hesse-Braubach to work as chaplain ("Hofprediger") to the court at Braubach. Johann was a younger brother to the Landgraf Georg, and Hesse-Braubach was an adjacent (and smaller) territory to Hesse-Darmstadt. Whereas Schupp's previous work had been, in the first instance, a university position, he was now employed, principally, as a churchman. There were nevertheless a number of complementary appointments from the start. In addition to being employed at Braubach as court chaplain, Schupp's roles also included the ecclesiastical advisory post of "Konsistorialrat" and a job as Braubach's inspector of churches and schools. He quickly impressed Landgraf Johann with his combination of efficiency and candour, and during the final three years of the war he increasingly found himself entrusted by his employer with political and diplomatic duties.

=== Unexpected diplomat ===
By this time the great powers, exhausted, were feeling their way to a settlement that might put a permanent finish to the war. In April 1648 Landgraf Johann sent Balthasar Schupp with full powers to represent Hesse-Braubach in the negotiations at Osnabrück that would lead, later that year, to the signing of the Peace of Westphalia. Schupp's correspondence with his landgraf, which become available to historians only at the end of the nineteenth century, shows the complexity of the mission with which he had been entrusted, but also demonstrates that Landgraf Johann had chosen his emissary well. Despite representing a politically puny landgraviate, Schupp was able to win the confidence and respect of the diplomatic representatives of the great powers, and most importantly of Count Johan Oxenstierna, who was probably the more powerful of two leading Swedish delegates. Schupp nevertheless took care never to shed his clerical persona. Indeed, Oxenstierna even appointed him as chaplain to the entire Swedish delegation at the peace conference. Schupp also managed to establish excellent relations with Johan Adler Salvius, Oxenstierna's wily and quick-witted senior colleague at the peace conference, and the man who was seen, both at the time and subsequently, as Queen Christina's de facto personal representative in the negotiations. Another diplomat with whom Schupp established particularly cordial relations was Dietrich Reinkingk who was representing Bremen: Reinkingk had many daughters and in 1650, following the death of his first wife, Balthasar Schupp would marry one of them. It is apparent from surviving correspondence that, during his mission to Osnabrück, Schupp robustly represented the interests of Landgraf Johann, although he never hesitated to state his views plainly where he disagreed with a position taken by his landgraf.

The negotiations that led up to the signing of what came to be known as the Peace of Westphalia were endlessly complex, not leastly because there were no fewer than 109 individual delegations to be accommodated (although it seems there were no sessions at which all 109 delegations were present at the same time). Two complementary treaties were signed on 24 October 1648. The Treaty of Münster was a treaty between the Holy Roman Empire and Catholic France and their respective allies. The Treaty of Osnabrück was a treaty between the Holy Roman Empire and Protestant Sweden and their respective allies. The next day a service of thanksgiving was held at Osnabrück. (Note: Sources differ over whether this service took place at Osnabrück or at Münster.) Count Oxenstierna ensured that, as chaplain to the Swedish delegation ("Legationsprediger"), Balthasar Schupp was the man who delivered the sermon. Following the signings on 24 October 1648 copies of the treaty had to be sent to the governments involved for ratification. For nearly another four months, to his evident annoyance, Schupp was obliged to hang around in Münster while his family remained in Braubach, which for him gave rise to what one source describes as "all sorts of [personal] inconveniences". With ratification completed, a further series of formal ceremonies took place in Münster during the first half of February 1649 at which the appropriate documentary instruments of ratification were exchanged. The event was celebrated, this time in Münster, on 4 February 1649 (stili veteris) with a further service of thanksgiving. It was again Balthasar Schupp who delivered the sermon. During the next couple of years there would be further negotiations on matters such as military demobilisation (which seems to have involved the payment of a large amount of money to the Swedes) and papal protests against certain provisions relating to religion; but February 1649 would appear to have marked the end of any involvement with the treaty negotiations on the part of Balthasar Schupp.

=== Hamburg job offer ===
While working in Osnabrück during the run-up to the signings of the key documents included in the Peace of Westphalia, Schupp was able to make several trips back home to Braubach. There were also other brief work-related visits undertaken on behalf of Count Oxenstierna. It was during a visit to Wismar (which following its military occupation in 1628 had become the administrative centre of Sweden's German possessions, that he made a brief diversion to Hamburg, which at the time was one of the largest and most economically dynamic cities in German-speaking Protestant northern Europe. At the time of his visit the senior clerical job at the church of St. James ("Hauptkirche St. Jacobi") had recently fallen vacant, through the death on 16 July 1648 of Severin Schlüter. St.James' was one of Hamburg's five principal churches, and the church administrators were eager to win over Balthasar Schupp, whose international public profile as a preacher among opinion formers seems to have been much enhanced through his work in Osnabrück alongside Oxenstierna. Schupp was nevertheless still relatively unknown to most members of the congregation and it was decided, with the approval of the city fathers, to break with precedent by inviting Schupp to deliver a "test sermon". Pastor Johannes Müller, a notable theologian and a church minister with his own assigned pulpit at St. James' Church, confirmed that the candidate was "theologically sound", and backed up his judgement by agreeing that Schupp might use his own pulpit for the test sermon, which was duly delivered on 5 September 1648 (a Tuesday). Although Schupp was directly after this called back to Osnabrück in connection with his diplomatic duties, it would appear from the way his career unfolded during 1649 that his test sermon was well received.

By this time Schupp no longer had any intention of returning to his job in Braubach. In the short term his diplomatic duties kept him from accepting a new position in Hamburg (or anywhere else), but negotiations continued. At Schupp's request, Landgraf Johann indeed wrote a letter of recommendation on his behalf to the city fathers. The reply which the mayor and city councillors sent the Landgraf survives. It is dated 8 December 1648 and includes the assurance that the city fathers had passed the landgraf's letter on to the gentlemen of St. James' Church, who would take it into consideration in their forthcoming deliberations. It would appear from the correspondence that Schupp's backers for the job were by this time encountering irritation and impatience on the part of the Hamburg congregation over the delays that had arisen from Schupp's continuing diplomatic responsibilities. His own appeal and reputation, had meanwhile been further enhanced by the favourable reactions of the assembled diplomats to his sermon at the service of thanksgiving, held at Osnabrück on 25 October 1648, following the treaty signings the previous day.

=== Alternative offers ===
By the early part of 1649 Schupp was faced with an attractive list of competing job offers. Swedish friends had arranged that he should move to Bremen as "Domprediger" (literally, "cathedral preacher") although the actual duties and responsibilities involved would have been wider than a pedantic interpretation of the title would suggest. His Bremen portfolio would also, for instance, include duties as "Superintendent der Landgemeinden" (responsible for rural communities in the (Protestant) General Diocese of Bremen-Verden. A competing offer came from the church authorities of Münster (which as a result of the Peace of Westphalia reverted to Catholicism in 1648 despite the strength of Protestant sentiment in the region). The Münster offer was for the position of Superintendent General of the Prince-Bishopric and was accompanied by an assurance that he would enjoy a higher income than might await him in Hamburg. Although Schupp no doubt gave these competing offers proper consideration, he concluded that "for the education of my children and a number of other benefits, it seemed to me that a pastoral role in Hamburg would be better than a grand title somewhere else". (Note: "Wegen Education meiner Kinder und anderer Commoditäten halber deuchte mich, es sei ein Pastorat zu Hamburg besser, als anderswo ein großer Titel".)

=== Decision time ===
On 2 February 1649 Schupp was unanimously elected to take up the pastoral post in Hamburg, and the next day the Hamburg sent him a letter informing him of their decision and inviting him to make his appearance among them on the Friday preceding Palm Sunday, which that year meant 16 March 1649. At the same time the Hamburg Senate wrote to the royal Swedish legation at Münster, formally confirming their request for his release from his work for the Swedes. Schupp accepted the job, and the Swedish release arrived without more ado. He appears to have missed the Palm Sunday appointment, however.

Before taking up his New job Schupp returned up-river to collect his family. Along the way he stopped off at Darmstadt in order to take his leave of his former employer and benefactor Landgraf Georg II of Hesse-Darmstadt in person. Returning north towards Braubach from Darmstadt involved passing through Frankfurt, where he was intercepted by a courier with a message from the Protestant community in Augsburg urging him to abandon his Hamburg plans, and instead to accept a position in Augsburg. The offer was a tempting one, not least because it would have enabled him to progress directly his (first) father-in-law's work on education reform. There was also a threat from a "God-fearing countess" (probably Marie Magdalene, the widowed Countess of Lippe: 1606–1671) that if he persisted with the move to Hamburg and rejected the Augsburg offer she would personally make it her business to ensure that he would not go short of grief and tribulation. (Note: "... allein ich sorge, ihr werdet in eurer Hoffnung betrogen werden, und wenn ihr die Augsburger verlasset, so wird es euch an Kreuz und Trübsal nicht ermangeln.") Having already accepted the Hamburg post, however, Schupp decided to stick with it. The threatened tribulation was not to be foregone: during the early part of that summer in Braubach his family was struck down with illness which seems to have been a version of the all-too familiar plague. Departure was delayed by several months, and it was not till July 1649 that Schupp was able to relocate, with his family, to Hamburg and take up his new post.

Between 1649 and his death in 1661 Johann Balthasar Schupp served as chief minister ("Hauptpastor") at St. James' Church, Hamburg, where he quickly became known for the power of his preaching.

=== Hamburg years ===
On Friday 20 July 1649 Balthasar Schupp was installed in his new office by Pastor Müller who had, it seems, taken charge during the interregnum at the "Hauptkirche". Later a serious rivalry would emerge between the two men.

Nearly 40, he formed strong convictions on various topics based on his Protestant world view. He believed in the centrality of Christin faith in human existence. In these and other respects he may be compared to Philipp Spener (1635–1705) and the Pietists who came to the fore during the second half of the seventeenth century.

Schupp was very conscious of the burden of responsibilities that came with his office. There was some time for writing, but it is nevertheless no coincidence that whereas he had hitherto published only in Latin, works published during his eleven Hamburg years appeared in German. That transition alone would be enough to secure him a place in the history of German literature. He was, at least initially, able to limit his official work. He was required to preach three sermons a week, on Sundays, Wednesdays and Fridays. Sometimes there were also prayer sessions to be conducted on Thursdays. It was for the sermons, however, that he became known. It was normal for Lutheran pastors to use their sermons to launch attacks on Jews, Catholics, Calvinists and atheists. Schupp did not do that. The focus of his criticism was not on cohorts of people defined by shared religious beliefs, but on the sins and follies of his own fellow-citizens. In their style his sermons did not follow the traditional format of a formulaic and scholarly treatise. Instead his syntax was fresh, contemporary and compelling. He would use examples from the everyday lives of his listeners, introducing anecdotes and even jokes. Schupp employed these devices and techniques not only when addressing his own congregations, but also when appearing as a guest preacher in other churches nearby, greatly swelling congregations in the process.

His approach was, by the standards of the times, truly innovative, and by many criteria highly successful. But not everyone was impressed. There were those who interpreted rebukes in his sermons as personal insults and other who thought their life choices were no business of this tiresome preacher. From fellow clerics, steeped in the traditions of a more baroque approach to sermons and written religious pieces, came the criticism that the colloquial syntax of his delivery was inconsistent with the serious purposes of a sermon - any sermon. It soon became evident that as his sermons became ever more widely discussed, Schupp would have to learn to face criticism from both wings of the Christian faith among the good Protestant citizens of Hamburg.

=== Bereavement and remarriage ===
Personal tragedy struck on 12 June 1650 when Anna Elisabeth, his wife, died, possibly following a long period of poor health. His second marriage was to Sophie Eleonore Reincking and took place on 10 November 1651. She was a daughter of Dietrich Reinkingk, a friend from Schupp's time as a diplomat in Osnabrück whose fortunes had been enhanced after his friend and employer Prince Frederick succeeded to the throne of Denmark towards the end of 1648. Dietrich Reincking was no longer a senior diplomat representing Bremen: he was the Danish chancellor. The poet-pastor Johann Rist honoured both Schupp's bereavement and his second marriage with a warmly sympathetic poem, indicating that the two men were already in contact with one another. There were those who surmised that Schupp's marriage to his second wife was less amicable than his first marriage had been, but these are countered with suggestions that these negative reports were no more than malicious rumours put about by rival churchmen and others who found Schupp threatening or annoying.

=== Authorship ===
It was probably in 1654 that Balthasar Schupp started to produce a string of written pieces in the German language that are, for scholars of satirical writing, his most important and enduring contribution. Of those pieces for which the date can be ascertained, the first was "Der lobwürdige Löw" (loosely, "The commendable Lion" (Note: The text was purportedly an extended letter of congratulation addressed to a friend on the occasion of the man's marriage. In it Schupp praises the lion as a model exemplar for the husband to follow. It has been suggested by a modern scholar that the lion may also have been the bridgegroom's astrological sign.)), which was an extended letter of congratulation addressed to Schupp's friend Marcus Pensin in Stade (just to the west of Hamburg) in celebration of Pensin's marriage to Catharine, the daughter of the "Oberalt" Hinrich Schwelund. The ceremony itself is known to have taken place at St. James' church on 30 January 1654. This was followed by "Der rachgierige Lucidor" ("Vindictive Lucidor"). On 4 July 1656 he published one of his sermons under the title "Gedenk daran Hamburg" ("Think on it, Hamburg"). This was the only time he published one of his sermons in full as a written pamphlet, although quotations and extracts from some of his sermons do appear in some of his other publications. Other publications included "Sendschreiben an einen vornehmen Cavallier" ("Letter to a distinguished cavalier") which he published around the end of May 1657 under the pseudonym "Ambrosius Mellilambius" and "Ein holländisch Pratgen" (very loosely, "Dutch preachings/dialogue") of 21 June 1657, which concerns the conflicts known to English readers as the Anglo-Dutch Wars. From contemporary references it is clear that "Der geplagte Hiob" ("Plagued Job") must have appeared before Michaelmas (29 September) 1657, although there are today no surviving versions from before 1659. During the Summer of 1657 Schupp also used his Danish contacts to have a Latin language pamphlet published in Copenhagen. "Invitatio publica ad adornandum memoriale biblicum" was presented as an appendix to "Psalm 151" and consists of a letter (falsely) attributed to the apostle, Paul and addressed to the Laodiceans. (Note: A number of alleged Epistles to the Laodiceans already existed (and exist), dating from the earliest years of the Christian movement, although these are widely believed to have been forgeries of a document which, if it ever existed, was subsequently lost.)

=== Before the commissioners ===
It was on Michaelmas 1657 that Balthasar Schupp found himself facing a "Commission of the Ministry", a panel of senior Lutheran clergy that had been convened in response to the growing disquiet caused by his increasingly challenging complementary career as a published author. The commissioners requested, on behalf of the ministry that Schupp should (1) not produce theological writing under pseudonyms, (2) avoid the printing of any biblical apocrypha, (3) submit anything that he wrote to the church "seniors" so that it might be censored and (4) avoid including fables, jokes and funny stories in connection with phrases from Holy Scripture. According to the report of the encountered that was produced by the "Senior", Pastor Müller (who had also been sitting as chairman of the commission) Schupp agreed to the first two of these requests, but rejected the third and the fourth, insisting that they would have infringed his freedom. The meeting therefore ended with a "friendly request" from the commission that Schupp should "stick to the rules" ("intra terminos bleiben"). Although this is the most formal disciplinary exercise to which Schupp was subjected in connection with his writing, it was only the first of a series of confrontations with the church authorities involving Schupp during his final four years.

=== Absence of clerical rapprochement ===
Assuming "Senior", Pastor Müller report was a complete ones, none of the commissioners who interviewed Balthasar that Michaelmas thought to ask him if there were any other Schupp pamphlets currently at the printers. There were. "Salomo oder Regentenspiegel" ("Salomo or Regent's mirror" - published under the pseudonym "Antenor") and "Freund in der Noth" ("Friend in need" - published under the author's own name) both appeared just a few weeks later. "Freund in der Noth" was probably written on or shortly before 16 August 1657. "Salomo" was probably written a little earlier. Only the "Afterword to the reader" at the end of "Salomo" was clearly written after the Michaelmas hearing. The appearance of these pamphlets was seen by the ministers who had participated in the commission as a declaration of war on the part of Schupp, and a campaign was launched against him which may not have destroyed him factually or in the eyes of history, but which nevertheless sapped his energies and caused him very great aggravation.

=== A certain format: a certain approach ===
By this time the character and pattern of Schupp's pamphlets was becoming clear. He himself defined them as "small tracts" ("Tractätchen"): they were produced in the smallest of the standard publication formats of the time (Duodezformat). It is clear that they were eagerly sought out by readers, since there were many reprints produced over relatively short periods of time. They all deliver Schupp's personal views with uncompromising confidence and flair, and concern a range of topics that cover both public and private concerns. They are attractively written, but sometimes show a certain digressive tendency and are sometimes peppered with anecdotes which are not infrequently taken from the author's own life. Schupp's pamphlets can be broadly divided into two types: there are tracts which edify (such as "Die Predigt" ("The sermon"), "Der geplagte Hiob" ("Plagued Job"), "Die Krankenwärterin" ("The nurse"), "die Litanei" and "Golgotha") and there are those which Schupp himself classified as "political writings" which were primarily focused on public issues. These frequently demonstrate an engaging interplay of the frivolous and the serious. There are many instances of savage satire attacking public grievances, such as pennalism (abusive exploitation unequal employer:apprentice/student relations) and idiocies in universities and schools, systems and the hankering after what is new and "strange".

=== Intensifying confrontation ===
In the aftermath of the war, the aggressive satire of Schupp's later years was part of a broader trend, supported by increased public literacy and a rapid growth in the availability of printing presses. Others attacking the status quo with similar fervour included Johann Michael Moscherosch, Johann Lauremberg and Joachim Rachel. For the political and religious establishments the attacks were more threatening precisely because of their popularity bordering at times on populism. After the appearance on the streets of "Salomo oder Regentenspiegel" ("Salomo or Regent's mirror" - published under the pseudonym "Antenor") and "Freund in der Noth" ("Friend in need" - published under the author's own name) at the end of 1657 ministers of the Hamburg church establishment decided they needed inspiration and reassurance from the world of academe.

On 12 November 1657 the Hamburg pastors sent out two letters to the Theology Faculties at the Strasbourg and Wittenberg in which they sought authoritative answers to two questions:

- Was it right that a doctor of Theology who was also a cleric of the Lutheran church with responsibility over a large congregation and parish should preach and have printed witticisms, fables, satires and ridiculous anecdotes?
- The such a man should not defer to privately conveyed rebukes, but should react with contemptuous attacks, derision and blasphemy against colleagues, rather than desisting from the conduct complained of?

The answers came back from Strasbourg and a week later from Wittemberg, and were read out to conventions of the assembled clerics on 15 and 22 January 1658. The learned gentlemen of the university theology faculties agreed that Schupp's conduct described in the first question was not right. On the second question, reflecting their Lutheran credentials, the men from then university recommended that if nothing else worked, then the clerics should turn to the secular government.

Schupp was now invited for a further meeting with a delegation of senior Hamburg clergy. His request that he might know in advance what questions he should be prepared to answer was refused. He therefore in turn refused to meet the clerical delegation. The church ministers now turned to what nineteenth century sources identify as the Hamburg senate (generally referred to before 1861 as the "Rath" or city council). They found that Schupp had already lodged a plaint against the church authorities. On 27 January 1658 Balthasar Schupp attended an interview with the city fathers. The councillors made three principal demands: Schupp should not mention their meeting nor the dispute behind it from the pulpit; secondly, he should not have any more of his satirical pieces printed in Hamburg; and thirdly, he should attend a meeting with the senior clergy and resolve his differences with the Hamburg church establishment. Schupp agreed to the first two demands, but said he would not attend any meeting with the church authorities without first being able to inspect the advice that they had received from the universities. The next day the church representatives rejected that demand. At the same time they came up with their own demand that the city councillors should arrange an oral disputation between representatives of the two sides. The disputation, was to be supervised and arbitrated by representatives from the city council (senate).

=== Resolution by disputation? ===
The disputation was quickly arranged: it took place on 10 February 1658. "Senior", Müller, on behalf of the church authorities, applied for the councillors to hand over a copy of the plaint against them which Schupp had lodged with the city fathers the previous month. He demanded that Schupp should be required to expunge the fables, jokes and humorous anecdotes from his sermons and from his printed pamphlets. He then asked what further steps might be taken to remedy the aggravation caused: it turned out that Müller's question was rhetorical. The best solution, he continued, would be for the senior clerics to issue a document in which the questions at issue might be settled once and for all.

The chairman of the presiding delegation of councillors refused to hand over a copy of Schupp's complaint against the church authorities. He undertook to place the other two substantive demands before the full council for consideration.

Om 26 February 1658 Schupp appeared before a reconvened "Commission of the Ministry". The parties were probably taking part at the direction of the city councillors. Schupp again refused to provide the panel of churchmen with a copy of the complaint against the church authorities which he had previously lodged with the city fathers, insisting that he no longer had a copy of it. On the more substantive issue concerning the demands that he should change the way he preached and the contents of his published tracts, he referred his accusers to the record of the commission's hearing from when he had previous appeared on September 29, 1657. This had been drafted by Pastor Müller. He would not submit his sermons or tracts to the church authorities for "correction". There was nothing in them that he wished to change. Even if he were reduced to begging on the streets, his sermons and tracts were personal matters that were only answerable to himself and not subject to the jurisdiction of the commission: "es wären eine Sachen supra nostram crepidam". The February 26, 1658 hearing produced a total lack of agreement, and appeared to demonstrate that agreement would probably be impossible. The hearing appears to have ended in an atmosphere of heightened acrimony. Shortly after that the city council put an end to the dispute with an Amnesty Decree which imposed a requirement of silence on both parties. Although this put an end to the public warring, the underlying disagreements remained unaffected. By this time Schupp's tracts had nevertheless become less contentious. "Die Krankenwärterin: oder Auslegung des heiligen Vaterunser, wie man es mit armen, einfältigen kranken Leuten beten kann" (loosely, "The nurse, or interpretation of 'The Lord's Prayer' so that you can pray with poor simple people who are ill") was written during Advent in 1657: the first printed versions appeared during 1658.

=== "Seven evil spirits" ===
"Sieben böse Geister, welche heutiges Tages Knechte und Mägde regieren und verführe" (loosely, "Seven evil spirits which these days rule over and seduce household servants of both sexes") was written after 8 June 1657 and first printed before 5 April 1658. This tract discusses issues of the time involving household servants and tries to find ways to improve the situation. It clearly belongs to the "political" category rather than the "edifying" of Schupp's pamphlets, but in pursuit of its serious purpose it follows to a serious approach, even if it is still not entirely free of fables and anecdotes. In this tract Schupp at several points made free use of material that had already appeared in "Gesindeteufel" by Peter Glaser, which had appeared in 1564. It was not the first time that tracts by Schupp had featured what would in the twenty-first century be construed as plagiarism, but it was a particularly egregious example. Earlier instances had, perhaps been protected from criticism by the eccentric and witty terms in which they had been couched. Maybe by 1658 Schupp had simply accumulated more enemies among literary elites. Either way, on this occasion the blatant plagiarism triggered a literary feud that over time became strikingly toxic. "Der Bücherdieb gewarnt und ermahnt" ("The book thief admonished and warned") was the unfriendly dedication appearing at the front of an edition of the tract dated 14 March 1658 which was apparently intended for distribution at that year's Frankfurt Easter Fair. Till now Schupp had apparently been untroubled when editions of his tracts were published without his authorisation, but now he turned his energies to opposing these "pirate" editions which seem rapidly to have acquired the character of an orchestrated anti-Schupp campaign, conducted through the printed word.

=== Feuding ===
During the summer of 1658 a combative tract appeared under the title "Der Bücherdieb Antenor" ("The book thief Antenor" - Antenor was one of Schupp's most frequently used pseudonyms). The authors' names were given as Nectarius Butyrolambius and Ambrosius Mellilambius, who gave themselves the additional soubriquet "Arzneikunst Liebhabern" (loosely, "Medical artistry enthusiasts"). The publisher of the initial print-run was identified as "Pieter Jansoon" of Amsterdam. In fact, two editions were printed one directly after the other. A copy, which may be of a first edition, survives in the Berlin library (Note: library reference Bm 8530: Titel und 58 S. 12°) The tract was a screed of crude personal abuse against Balthasar Schupp. Any shortage of subtlety in the text is more than balanced by savagery. The true identity of the author has never been pinned down, although two centuries later a consensus had emerged that the author was probably Schupp's old clerical antagonist, Pastor Johannes Müller, and that furthermore Schupp knew it. In reality, Schupp's opinion of its authorship seems to have shifted over time, and may have been more nuanced. Writing in his tract "Calender" which was first printed in 1659 and which he addresses/dedicates to his son Anton Meno Schupp (1637–1703), Schupp himself opines that the author using the name Butyrolambius was not necessarily even an ordained minister. What does become apparent is that, regardless of his opinions on the authorship, Schupp was powerfully affected by "Der Bücherdieb Antenor": the book preoccupied him for several years.

In December 1660 in "der Litanei" (printed in 1661, the last of his tracts to appear before he died) Schupp quoted an utterance from Pastor Müller in a manner which implied that he thought it unlikely that Müller agreed with the sentiments of "Butyrolambius": it is possible that by this time his opinion on the likely identity of Butyrolambius had shifted. In any case, although "Butyrolambius" was clearly aware of the various sessions that had taken place involving Balthasar Schupp and Müller's "Commission of the Ministry", the information about them that is contained in "Der Bücherdieb Antenor" is not sufficiently accurate to support the view that it had come directly from Müller himself. The evidence adduced in support of Müller having been the author (or one of the authors) of "Der Bücherdieb Antenor" is very far from conclusive.

According to an old chronicle, on 31 October 1658 Schupp took a copy of "Der Bücherdieb Antenor" into his pulpit at Hamburg and used a sermon to complain to his congregation about the treatment he had been accorded in it by "Butyrolambius". By the time the Hamburg church establishment had used their influence to ensure that Schupp could no longer find a printer in Hamburg for his pamphlets which instead were now being printed in Wolfenbüttel (Dithmarschen). In December 1658 Schupp took a trip to Wolfenbüttel, where he made the time to compose not one but two pamphlets on the offending pasquinade. The shorter of them, "Relation aus dem Parnasso", was printed in Wolfenbüttel that same month. The second of them, "Calender", is a more considered but no less passionate refutation, comprising more than 100 pages. It includes the date 20 December 1658 below text on the final page, but on the title page at the front, the year of printing in (what appears to be) the first edition is shewn as 1659. He also prepared a third refutation text in response to "Der Bücherdieb Antenor", under the title "Prüfung des Geistes Nectarii Butyrolambii" (loosely, "Critical review of the spirit of Nectarius Butyrolambius"). This was referenced in both of the first two, but it seems that it was never printed.

Schupp's sermon on 1 January 1659 was particularly offensive in its condemnation of the church ministerial establishment. Shortly after this the city council, exasperated by the continuing feuding between Schupp and his fellow pastors, issued him with a warning. By the end of January "Calender" had appeared in the book shops, and the Hamburg pastors reacted by submitting to the city council a detailed submission on 27 January 1659. All their objections to Schupp's conduct were set out again: "...such aggravating matters and the major disruption to our church, as well as the [resulting] grievance condition of the [Hamburg church] ministry is no longer conscionable". (Note: "...solchem ärgerlichen Wesen und großer Zerrüttung unserer Kirche, wie auch dem betrübten Zustande des Ministerii nicht länger zuzusehen") Although the reaction of the city fathers is unknown, something of it can be inferred from Schupp's subsequent actions.

=== Moving on? ===
About six months after that Balthasar Schupp's tract "Abgenöthigte Ehrenrettung" appeared, with a dedication addressed, by name, to each of the Hamburg city councillors. In it Schupp refutes again the allegations against him.

=== More pamphlet attacks ===
Meanwhile, another literary opponent came onto the scene. "Discurs de republica academica" was printed in Leipzig in 1659. In it the author, identified as Master Bernhard Schmid, produced a systematic refutation of "Freund in der Noth" References also appear to a third opponent who had printed a tract in Leipzig, this time attacking "Calender". In response to this attack (authorship of which remains unknown) Schupp produced a "Eilfertiges Sendschreiben an den Calenderschreiber zu Leipzig" (loosely, "Urgent letter to the Leipzig 'Calender' writer") which was printed in Altona, still in 1659.

=== Final years ===
Despite Balthasar Schupp's background in education, it was not till the next year that Schupp committed his thoughts on the schools and universities to one of his tracts. The result was entitled "Ambassadeur Zipphusius". However, this was printed only posthumously, and at the instigation of his son, Jost Burchard Schupp, who included it in a 1667 compendium of Schupp's collected works. There were several more tracts printed during Schupp's final couple of years, mostly in the "edifying" rather than the "political" category. At least a further three were published posthumously by one or other of his sons. The order in which these were actually written is not entirely clear.

The struggles of his final years took their toll. Johann Balthasar Schupp never reached old age, but died at Hamburg of a "violent illness" some months short of what would otherwise have been his fifty-second birthday on 26 October 1661. Sources giving more details of his death indicate that his final days were marked by a rapid deterioration which was unresponsive to the curative efforts of the physicians. He died towards the end of the morning, at around eleven o'clock, "in a spirit of great and unbelievable joy". His last recorded words, appropriate to his pastoral calling, were: "I believe in the forgiveness of sins, the resurrection of the body and an everlasting life".

For many years Balthasar Schupp was forgotten. During the nineteenth century he was rediscovered by scholars such as Ludwig Wachler, Friedrich Adolf Ebert and, later in the century, Carl Bertheau. Following this revival in his reputation, at least one of these was content to share the judgement that Johann Balthasar Schupp had become "generally regarded as one of the most significant men of his time".

== Published output (selection) ==
- Dissertatio Praeliminaris De Opinione, Johan-Balthasaris Schuppii, Eloquentiae Et Historiarum Professoris in Academia Marpurgensi. - Rintelii : Lucius, 1640. published digitally by the Universitäts- und Landesbibliothek Düsseldorf
- Ineptus Orator. - Ed. tertia. - Marpurgi : Chemlin, 1642. published digitally by the Universitäts- und Landesbibliothek Düsseldorf
- "Eusebia prodeumbulans", 1642
- "Aurora", 1642
- "De Arte Ditescendi Dissertatio Prior ex Avellino Ad Philosophos in Germaniä", 1645
- "Morgen- und Abendlieder", 1655
- "Gedenk daran", 1656
- "Von der Kunst Reich zu werden"
- "Der Rachgierige und unversöhnliche Lucidor", 1657
- "Salomo oder Regentenspiegel", 1657
- "Freund in der Not", 1657
- "Der Bücherdieb", 1658
- "Relation aus dem Parasso", 1658
- "Ein Holländisch Pratgen", 1659
- "Der geplagte Hiob", 1659
- "Dr. Lucianus", 1659
- "Eilfertiges Sendschreiben", 1659
- "Kalender", 1659
- "Abgenötigte Ehrenrettung", 1660
- "Corinna oder die ehrbare Hure", 1660

posthumously published:

- "Ninivitischer Bußspiegel", 1667
- "Lehrreiche Schriften", 1677
- "Der schändliche Sabbathschänder", 1690
- "O edle Wunden, was soll ich", hymn
- "Vom Schulwesen", 1891
