= Deutsche Schule Stockholm =

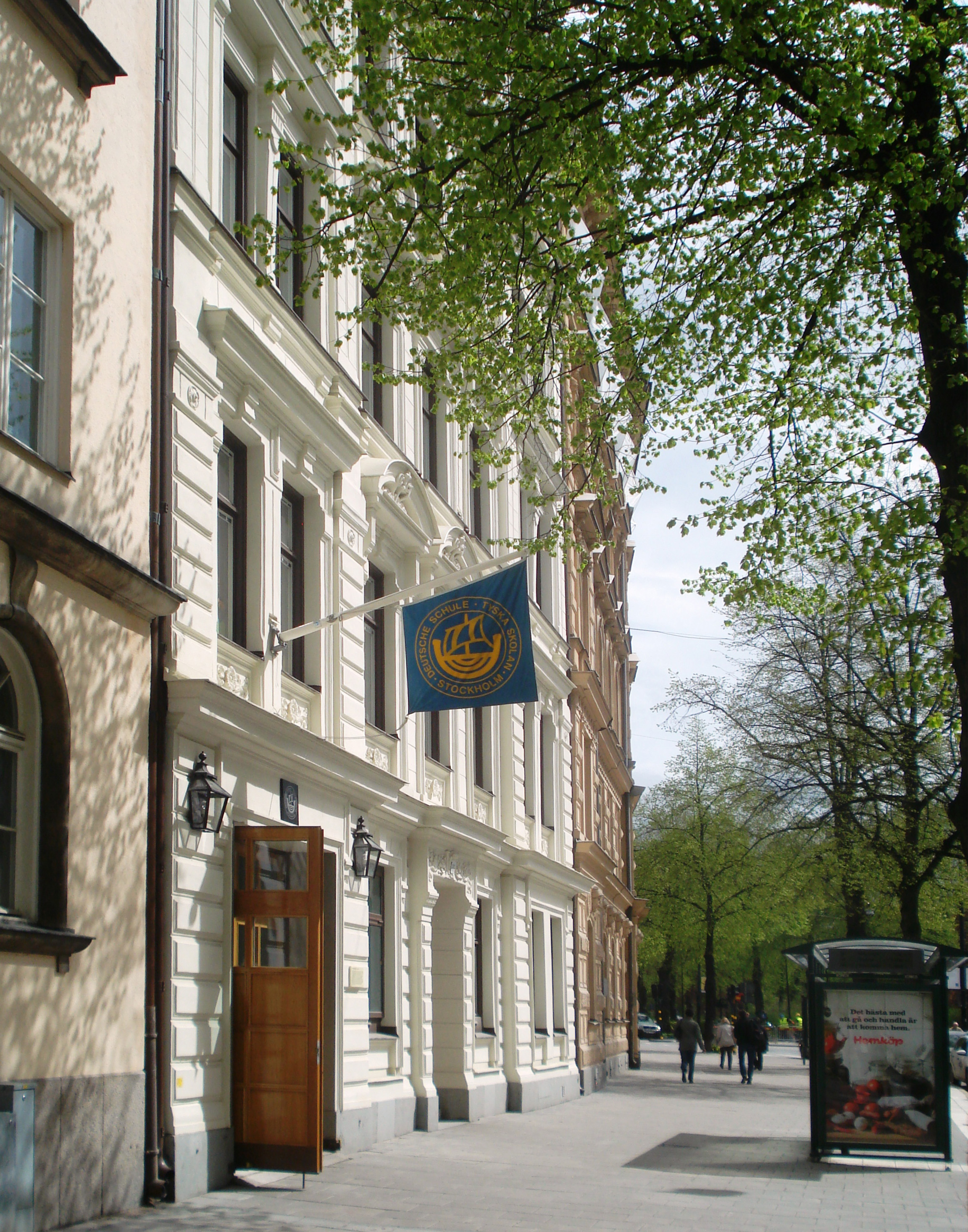
- The school

Location
- Karlavägen 25, 114 31 Stockholm, Sweden; Sweden; 59°20′32″N 18°04′12″E

Information
- Type: German international school
- Established: 1612
- School district: Östermalm
- Grades: Preschool through year 12 of gymnasium
- Campus type: Urban

Deutsche Schule Stockholm (Swedish: Tyska skolan Stockholm) is a German international school in Stockholm, Sweden. It serves levels preeschool through year 12 of gymnasium.

The German school Stockholm is the second oldest German school outside of Germany, only beat by the German school in Copenhagen "Deutsche Schule St. Petri Kopenhagen".

== History ==
In 1612 the German Church, Stockholm, received the privilege by the then-reigning Swedish king Gustavus II Adolphus to form a German school. As Stockholm had been a destination for traders of the Hanseatic League for a long time, the children of these German-speaking mercenaries had to find a place to educate themselves, which was found in the German School.
