= Johann Heinrich Tonsor =

German theologian

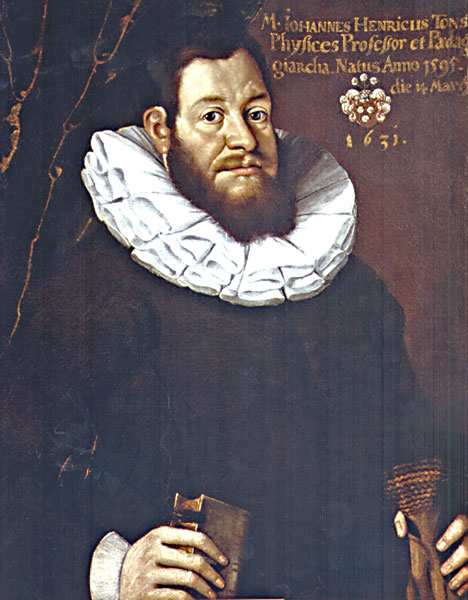
- Johann Heinrich Tonsor
- Born: 14 March 1595; Igstadt
- Died: 1 December 1649 (aged 54); Giessen
- Occupation: Theologian

Johann Heinrich Tonsor (14 March 1595 – 1 December 1649) was a German theologian.

== Life ==
Johann Heinrich Tonsor was born as the son of the Lutheran pastor Jonas Tonsor and Justina Fabri (Faber) and grew up in Kirtorf and Alsfeld in what is now the Vogelsberg district.

== Career ==
After studying theology, philosophy and education at the University of Marburg, Tonsor became professor of physics at University of Giessen in 1620 and then professor of physics at the University of Marburgin 1625. In 1633 he received his doctorate in theology with a treatise entitled De baptismo. In 1628 he served as vice-rector and in 1648 as rector of the University of Marburg.
