= Dietrich Reinkingk =

Dietrich Reinkingk Theodor Reinking (in Latin sources)
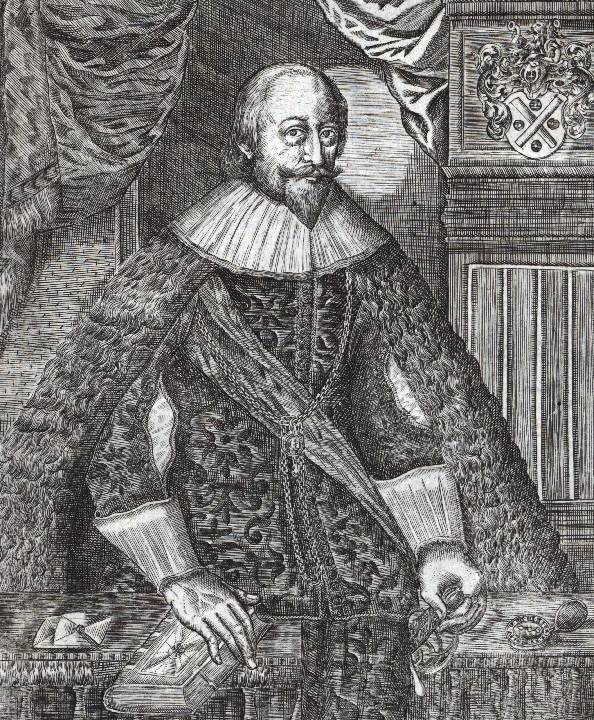
- Born: 10 March 1590; Windau (Ventspils), Courland, Polish–Lithuanian Commonwealth
- Died: 15 December 1664 (aged 74); Glückstadt, Holstein, Holy Roman Empire
- Occupation(s): Academic (Law); Politician
- Spouse(s): 1. Catharina Pistorius (1596-1661: m. 1616); 2.Dorothea Schiele (Schele) (m.1663)
- Children: 11

Dietrich Reinkingk (in Latin sources Theodor Reinking (10 March 1590 – 15 December 1664) was a German constitutional lawyer and politician, much of whose career was adversely impacted by the Thirty Years' War (1618-1648).

He was also an important early contributor to the Reichspublizistik movement, which sought to document and thereby promote and legitimise the constitutional arrangements and processes that operated in the Holy Roman Empire.

== Life ==
Dietrich Reinkingk was born in 1590 in Windau (Ventspils), a port city and commercial centre now in Latvia, then in the Duchy of Courland, a vassal duchy of the Polish–Lithuanian Commonwealth. His father, Otto Reinkingk, came from a well established Lutheran family of army officers and government officials. His mother, born as Hedewig von Lambsdorf, died in 1603 while Dietrich was still a child. It was also in 1603 that the boy was sent away from home, in order to escape from a plague epidemic. He ended up living with relatives in Osnabrück, where his grandfather had once been an alderman, and which is where he attended secondary school. His subsequent schooling took him to nearby Lemgo and Stadthagen, where in 1610 he wrote a substantial dissertation on his subject, Law.

In 1611 Reinkingk moved on to study at Cologne, and then Marburg, where his subjects were Philosophy and Legal sciences. He received his doctorate for a dissertation entitled De brachio seculari et ecclesiastico in 1616. Soon after this he was working at the Lutheran University of Giessen.

In 1617 Ludwig of Hesse-Darmstadt had Reinkingk appointed to an associate professorship at the Law Faculty of his new university in Giessen. However, Reinkingk left the faculty in 1618 when he was appointed a "Court Councillor" ("Hofrat") at Giessen. Further appointments in Hesse-Darmstadt, now for the court/government administration rather than in the academic world, followed. In 1622 he was appointed an imperial vice-chancellor in Marburg. He obtained a position with Adolf Frederick I, Duke of Mecklenburg, became Chancellor of Mecklenburg, based in Schwerin in 1632. Mecklenburg had come under the influence of Sweden, but the power relationships between the belligerent powers were in a state of some flux during the 1630s, and with a background of shifting alliances and allegiances, by 1635 his role Adolf Frederick's man in Schwerin made him a target for the Swedish army. Swedish troops arrested him in 1635. He was released in 1636, however, and took a post working for the Diocesan administrator of Bremen, better known as Prince Frederick of Denmark, a son of the Danish king. He became a trusted advisor to Prince Frederick, who entrusted him with several important diplomatic missions. As chancellor in the administration of Bremen, Reinkingk took part in peace negotiations at Münster and Osnabrück which eventually led to the end of the war in 1648. More immediately, however, for Reinkingk involvement in the negotiations led to a further period of imprisonment by the Swedes, between 1645 and 1647.

In 1648 the Danish king died and Reinkingk's prince succeeded his father, becoming King Frederick III of Denmark. This led to Reinkingk's appointment as a Danish Privy councillor. He was also made Chancellor of what was known to the Danes as the "German Chancellery”, based in Glückstadt. This amounted to a senior position at the court in Copenhagen coupled with senior administrative responsibilities for the king's southern territories of Schleswig-Holstein, where use in churches of Luther's High German translation of the bible was increasing daily use of German, albeit without entirely displacing Danish and other vernaculars. In 1649 or 1650, the year of his sixtieth birthday, Dietrich Reinkingk was appointed to a position he had coveted, as President of the Appeal Court at Pinneberg.

Unlike most of the Danish King's lands Holstein, which was included in Reinkingk's own extensive administrative bailiwick, was part of the Holy Roman Empire (as its most northerly region). In 1655 or 1656 the Emperor Ferdinand raised Reinkingk to the imperial nobility.

Dietrich Reinkingk (1590-1664): publications (not a complete list)

- Conclusiones CCXC de Bracchio seculari et ecclesiastico seu potestate utraque (Promotion in 290 Konklussionen). Gießen 1616
- Tractatus de Regimine seculari et ecclesiastico. 1619, viele weitere Auflagen
- Biblische Policey. Fft./Main 1653.
- Jus feciale Armatae Daniae. Kopenhagen 1657.
- Der verjüngte Römische Reichsadler, samt der Macht und Herrlichkeit des Reiches über alle Reiche. Hrsg. Johann Diedrich von Güling. Göttingen 1687

== Personal ==
Dietrich Reinkingk married Catharina Pistorius on 3 October 1616. She predeceased him on 24 October 1661, by which time their 45-year marriage had produced 11 recorded children. His second marriage, on 25 February 1663, was to Dorothea, born Dorothea Schiele/Scheele and by now the widow of Johann Vieth (1581-1646).

Dietrich Reinkingk died at Glückstadt on 15 December 1664. His remains were buried at nearby Rellingen in the family burial vault, which still (2015) exists.

== Writings and teachings ==
The survival of Dietrich Reinkingk's notability is in large part the result of his written work. In the context of what later came to be known as the Reichspublizistik movement, Reinkingk was the most prominent advocate of imperial conservatism. He rejected rationalist contemporary theories that favoured a distancing from Imperial authority. Reinkingk imputed to the old Roman sources of the law a level of authority equal to that of Holy Scripture, eternal theological fundamentals and Lutheran dogma. His legal teaching was influenced by Lutheran ethics and by biblical theology, but tending towards a unified post-confessional constitutional order.

His objective was to preserve the threatened order spelled out in 1555, and to anchor it constitutionally. He savagely dismissed countervailing modern trends:

- "Modern "Reasons of state" are Reasons of the Devil. God's Laws and observance of them, by contrast, provide the best rationale and preserve the state."
