= Claus Kurssell's coup =

Failed coup in Reval

Date	January 1570 – June 1571
Location	Reval (modern day Tallinn)
Result	Swedish victory
Territorial changes	Reval castle recaptured by Swedish forces

Belligerents
Sweden	Mercenaries

Commanders and leaders
John III; Nils Dobblare; Clas Åkesson Tott	Claus Kurssell (executed)

Strength
At least 300 knights	Unknown

Casualties and losses
Unknown	Almost everyone captured

Claus Kurssell's coup was a revolt by German mercenaries in the then Swedish city of Reval (modern day Tallinn); the perpetrators temporarily had control of the city's castle before John III sent Nils Dobblare to intervene and recapture it.

== Background ==
During the Long wrath, the Swedish holdings in Estonia became increasingly insecure, mainly due to the fact that they were mostly supported German or Baltic mercenaries. The largest of the Swedish holdings was the city of Reval, which the Swedes had managed to take by bribing local mercenaries.

== Coup ==
=== Beginning ===
Dissatisfaction over their pay being insufficient or not being delivered at all irritated the German mercenaries relationship with the Swedish crown, and it escalated to a crisis in January 1570 when King John wanted Kurssell and his troops to instead serve in Sweden and receive their pay there.

=== Capture of Reval castle ===
In the night, Kurssell and his troops overwhelmed the people who were loyal to Sweden and captured Reval castle, where they also took governor Gabriel Oxenstierna hostage. Through this action, Kurssell also got in contact with a certain Danish prince by the name of Magnus, who had recently come in control of Ösel.

The Swedish council quickly brokered an agreement of where Kurssell released Gabriel Oxenstierna, in exchange that the castle would remain in Kurssell's possession until Pentecost Sunday when it was expected that John III would have paid the owed amount.

=== Outside reaction ===
From the Swedish perspective, Kurssell was suspected of being in cooperation with Sweden's enemies. Duke Charles (later Charles IX) persuaded John III to negotiate with Kurssell, whom he believed to be an "honest and sincere man". Despite this, quick countermeasures took place. Reval's loyalty to John isolated Kurssell, and the Estonian nobility remained neutral.

=== Nils Dobblare's coup ===
Nils Dobblare, who at that time occupied Domberget, had kept in touch with two knights who had fled to the castle. Dobblare began collecting money to start gambling parties among Kurssell's troops, who would use the money for "beer and fun". After the knights had become thoroughly drunk, the two knights pulled down a rope ladder, and with the help of Dobbler they were able to secretly get 300 knights into the castle. Kurssell and his knights were surprised and quickly overwhelmed, and Dobblare took back "with long pipes" what he had spent on the gambling parties. Kurssell and other important figures were taken captive, and Kurssell was later executed in June.

== Aftermath ==
John III later wrote to Dobblare about his successful mission in retaking the castle, and he allowed Dobblare to keep Kurssell's golden chain.
