= Swedish Wismar =

Former territory of Sweden

Coordinates: 53°54′N 11°28′E

Swedish Wismar Svenska Wismar Schwedisch Wismar
- 1648–1903
- Flag of Sweden Coat of arms

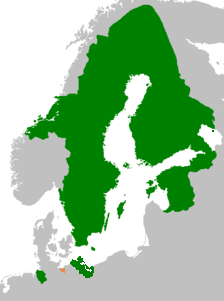
- Location of Wismar (orange) under Swedish rule within the Kingdom of Sweden (green) in 1658
- Status: Swedish Dominion
- Capital: Wismar
- Common languages: Low German/German, Swedish
- Religion: Lutheranism
- Government: Principality
- Duke
  - 1648–1654: Christina (first)
  - 1872–1903: Oscar II (last)
- History
  - Peace of Westphalia: 24 October 1648
  - Pawned to Mecklenburg-Schwerin: 1803
  - Swedish Renouncement of Claim: 1903
Preceded by	Succeeded by
Duchy of Mecklenburg-Güstrow	Grand Duchy of Mecklenburg-Schwerin

Swedish Wismar (Swedish: Svenska Wismar) was a Dominion under the Swedish Crown from 1648 to 1903 and corresponded roughly to the modern boundaries of the city of Wismar. The former Hanseatic city lies on the Baltic coast of modern-day Germany.

== History ==
Map of the Swedish possessions in Wismar, Neukloster and Poel.

=== Early history ===
Following the Polish War and the Thirty Years' War, Sweden held extensive control over the lands on the southern Baltic coast, including Pomerania and parts of Livonia and Prussia. Wismar was first occupied by Sweden in 1628. The military occupation was converted into full ownership at the Peace of Westphalia. Alongside the city Sweden gained control over the area around Neukloster as well as parts of the island of Poel. Wismar quickly became the administrative center of all of Sweden's German possessions when the Royal Swedish Tribunal was set up in the Fürstenhof. This necessitated a buildup of Wismar's fortifications, an operation that Field Marshal Erik Dahlbergh was appointed to lead. The result was completely self-contained fortifications with bulwarks as an effective all-round defence system – a system meeting the most modern requirements was thus refined to great efficiency. Remains of these fortifications have been preserved, among other places, in the ‘Lindengarten' to the east of the wall of the old city.

=== Great Northern War ===
Wismar was occupied by a coalition of Danish, Prussian, and Hanoverian troops during the Great Northern War of 1700–1721. This resulted in the destruction of the city's elaborate defence system. After the Treaty of Frederiksborg ended the war, Wismar was returned to Swedish control. However, since Sweden had lost several nearby possessions (such as Bremen-Verden) to its rivals, Wismar began to lose significance as it became more of an outpost of Swedish control rather than the center of a larger hub.

=== End of Swedish rule ===
In 1803 Sweden pledged both the town and lordship to Mecklenburg-Schwerin for 1,258,000 Riksdaler, reserving, however, the right of redemption after 100 years. In view of this contingent right of Sweden, Wismar was not represented at the diet of Mecklenburg until 1897. In 1903 Sweden finally renounced its claims on the town.

== Architecture ==
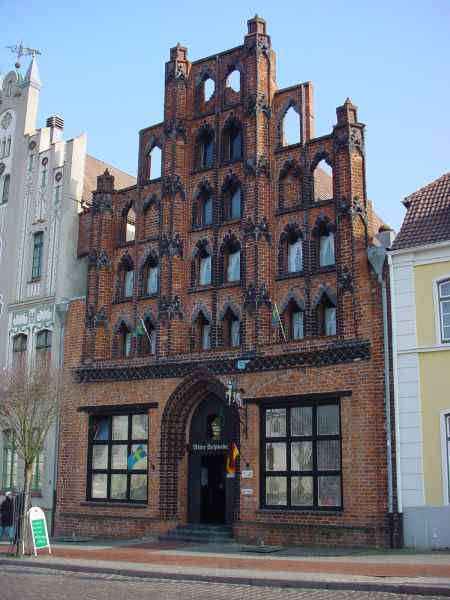
The Alter Schwede (Old Swede) building in central Wismar

Many of Wismar's most distinctive buildings were built during this period of Swedish control. The building styles of Sweden mixed with the methods prevalent during Wismar's time in the Hanseatic League to create an architectural theme unique to the Baltic coast of Germany and Poland. The evidence of this historic style, known as Brick Gothic, in a number of structures led to them receiving the status of UNESCO World Heritage Site in 2002. This site is shared with the city of Stralsund.

== See also ==
- Brick Gothic
- Sweden-Norway
- Swedish Pomerania
- Wismar affair
