= Wismar affair =

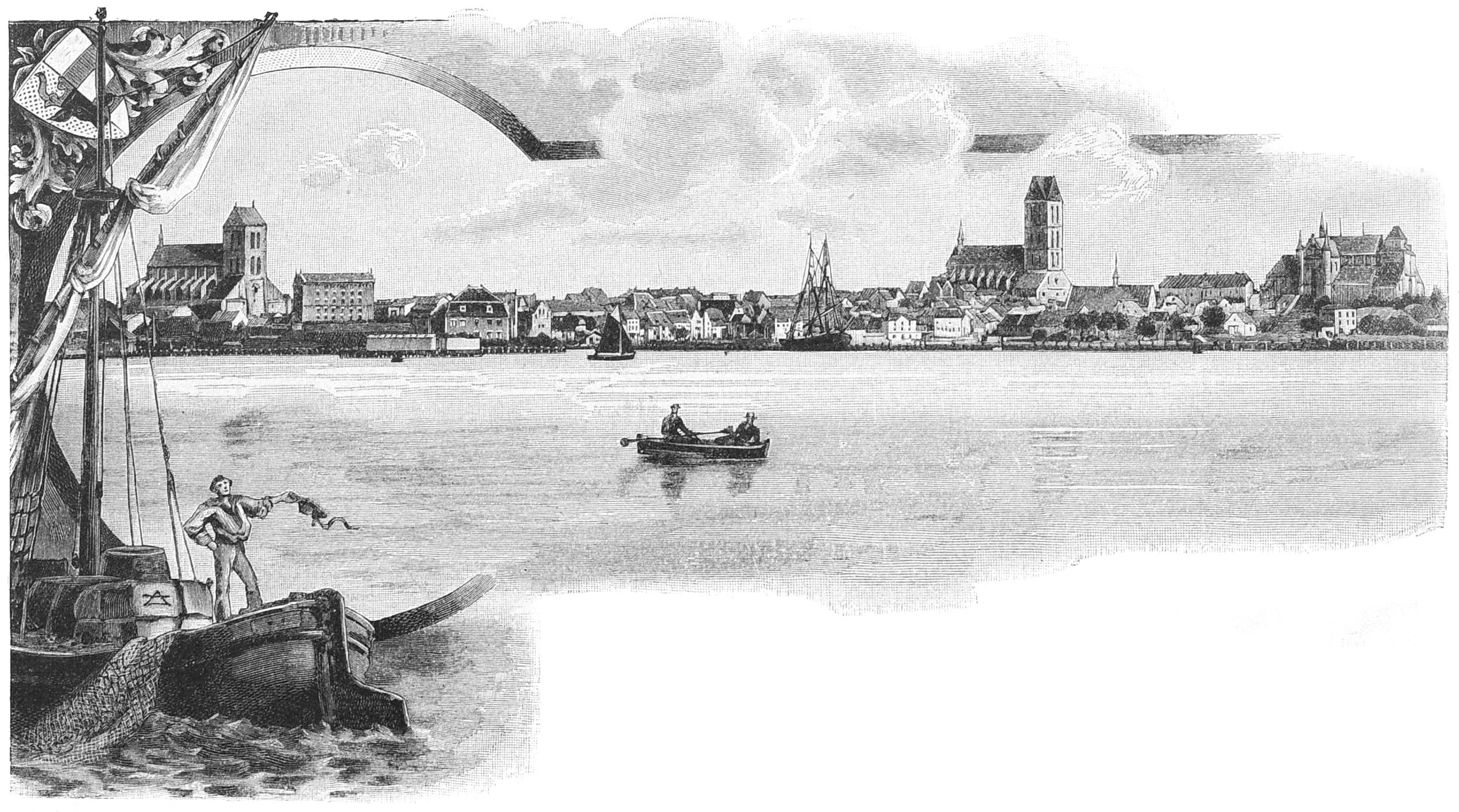
Wismar in 1892

The Wismar affair refers to the political discussions over the status of the town of Wismar between 1796 and 1903. Wismar was leased to Mecklenburg-Schwerin from Sweden for a sum of 1,250 000 riksdalers. The lease was supposed to last every 100 years, whereafter Sweden (later the United Kingdoms of Sweden and Norway) would possess the right to redeem the city. However, as the German Empire rose throughout the 19th century, the possibility of Sweden demanding the return of the territory seemed more and more unlikely as King Oscar II would not like to challenge a great power. Furthermore, the rent of the loan had grown to 96 million kronor, an amount that Stockholm was not too enthusiastic to pay. As 1903 came, the German and Swedish diplomats met in Stockholm to discuss the future of the town. Oscar II would agree to sign the treaty of Stockholm which stipulated the waving of all Swedish claims on the city.

== Background ==
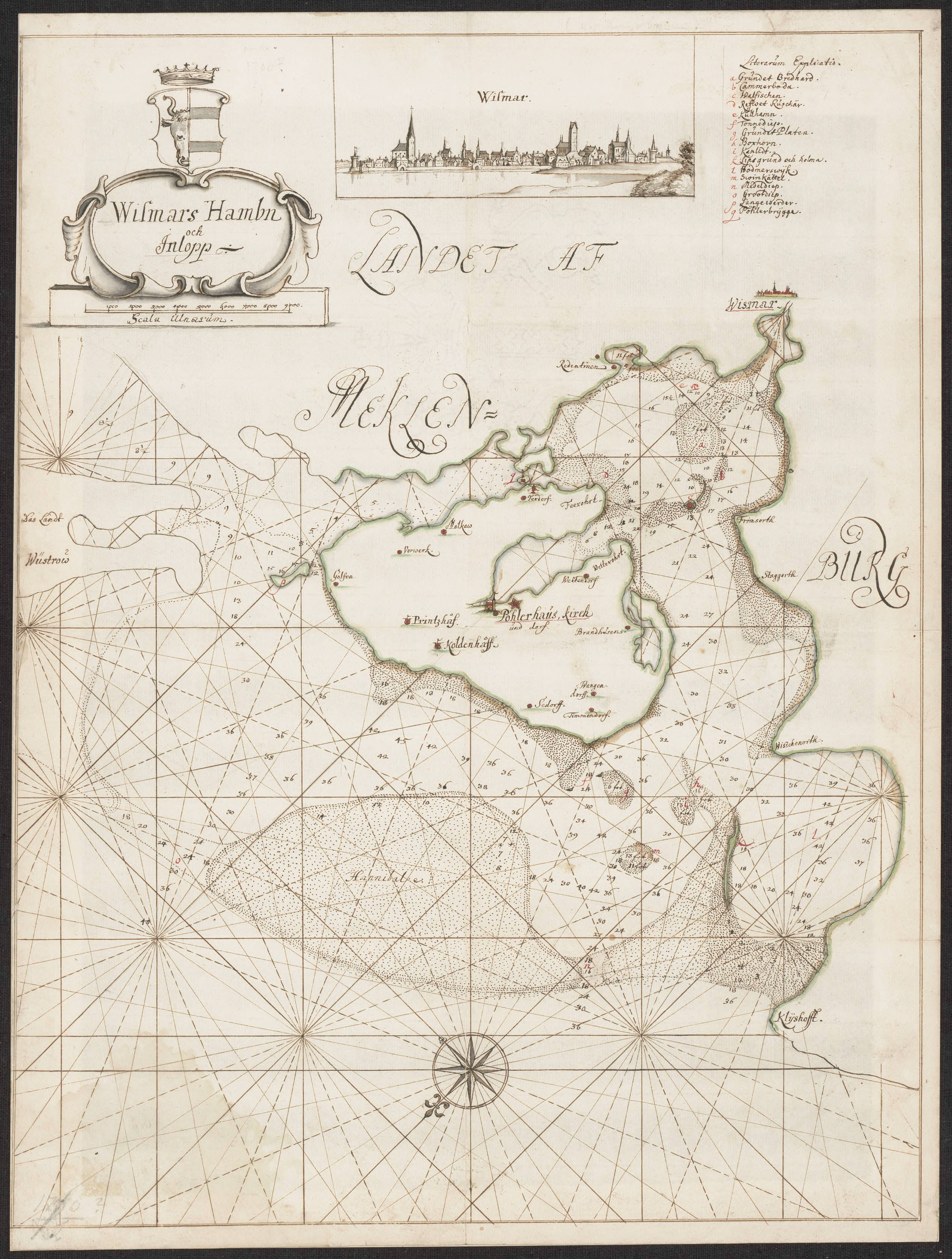
17th-century map of Wismar

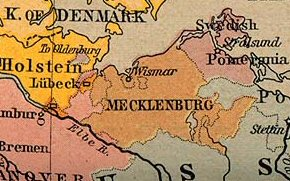
The town of Wismar and the Duchy of Mecklenburg-Schwerin.

Wismar first came under Swedish rule as the soldiers of Gustavus Adolphus marched into the city in 1632 during the Thirty Years War. However, the city (including the surrounding territories of Neukloster and Poel) became a De-jure part of Sweden due to the Treaty of Westphalia in 1648. However, the territories were somewhat neglected in favor of the bigger and more profitable Swedish-German territory of Pomerania. Wismar did however remain an important Mecklenburgan trading city well into the 18th century.

== Affair ==
In 1796, Gustav IV of Sweden divorced Luise Charlotte of Mecklenburg-Schwerin. Her father, Duke Friedrich Franz, was outraged and demanded Wismar as compensation. Friedrich appealed to the Danish court for mediation where it was decided that a sum of 100,000 Riksdalers would be paid by Sweden as compensation (6,000 every year). However, Mecklenburg-Schwerin's desire to take control over Wismar persisted regardless as Mecklenburg diplomats attempted to persuade Russia to support them in the matter in 1797. The Tzar assured Friedrich that Russia would not hesitate to support Mecklenburg-Schwerin in a defensive war but refused to support any aggressive expansion into the city. Failing to gain the support of Russia, August von Lützow was instead tasked with securing a deal with Sweden to buy Wismar. The Swedes had themselves tried in vain to sell the territory to Prussia just a few years earlier. Lützow met with the Swedish general Von Toll in Russia and managed to make him agree to bring up the matter when he returned home. Although Gustav IV was fond of the idea of selling Wismar to Mecklenburg-Schwerin, the negotiations on the stipulations of the handover would drag on. Eventually, on the 26th of June, the respective sides would both sign the Treaty of Malmö which stipulated that Sweden would lease the territory to Wismar in exchange for a loan of 1,250 000 Riksdalers and the Swedish crown would sell all of their possessions and estates in the city. Furthermore, Sweden would have the right to redeem the territory every 100 years in exchange for the return of the loan. Sweden would also no longer have the right to collect customs of merchants passing by Wismar.

Throughout the rest of the 19th century, Wismar had a special status as a half German half Swedish city as they maintained their own laws and their own flag. German intellectuals in Wismar speculated if Sweden (As a part of Sweden-Norway) would ever use their right to claim overlordship over the city to reclaim some remnants of the now long gone Swedish Empire. However, Mecklenburg-Schwerin had as of the 18th of August 1866 been a part of the North German Confederation which later in 1871 expanded south forming the German Empire. These developments meant that if Sweden-Norway would ever try to demand the return of the city, they would have to enter a dispute with a great power. Furthermore, Germany appeared as if they were planning to keep the city as Wismar was finally included in the diet of Mecklenburg-Schwerin in 1897.

=== 1900-1903 ===
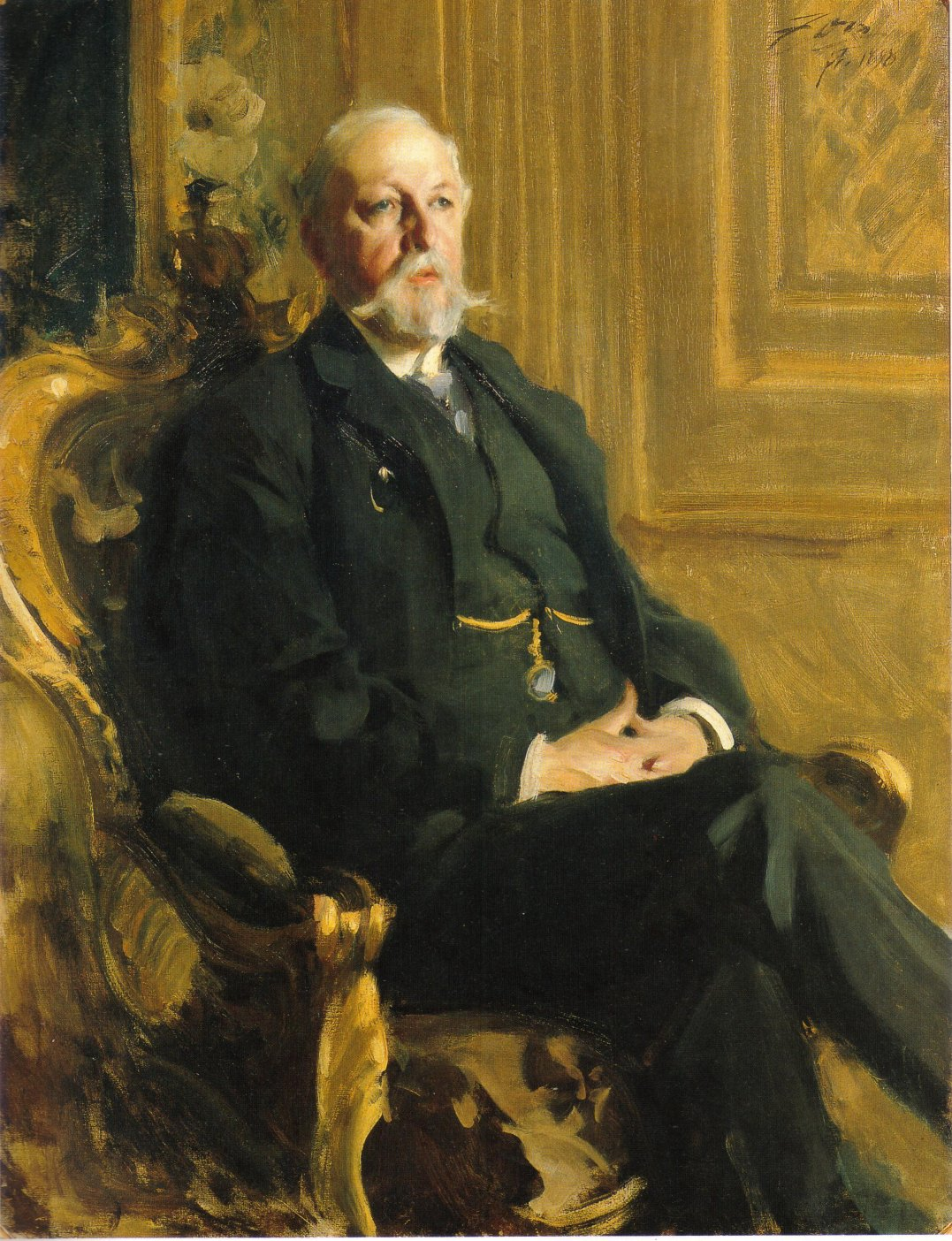
King Oscar II of Sweden

Discourse regarding the right of Sweden to annex Wismar remerged as 1903 came closer. Germany began to put pressure on Sweden to give up claims on the city in 1900. Swedish explorer and politically engaged Sven Hedin stated that any renunciation of Swedish claims would only be done if compensation was given to Sweden. He proposed that a sum of 108 million marks should be paid in return. Regarding Sven Hedin's statements, the German army surrounded Wismar to intervene if so needed. However, as 1903 came, King Oscar II of Sweden decided not to redeem the city. The rent of the 1803 loan had grown to 96 million Kronor, an amount that Sweden-Norway was not too keen on paying. Furthermore, it was evident that Germany would never accept the loss of Wismar, especially to a weak nation like Sweden-Norway. Oscar II was scared that a political crisis would erupt if Sweden-Norway insisted on the city's return. Such a crisis could hurt the Swedish-Norwegian position in Europe as it would likely cause tensions with Germany. The Swedish Riksdag was also of the opinion that Wismar should remain German and would support Oscar II in his decision as was the Swedish writer Carl Lundin who argued that Sweden never could keep Wismar long term.

"The redeeming of the city will never be taken into consideration, the transfer of the city was done to last as proven by the fact that both the Germans and the Swedes were in complete unity and had not even maintained different proposals of what is to be done with the city during the preliminary negotiations."

— Carl Lundin (Note: Rough translation from the original Swedish text: "attnågon inlösning af panten aldrig skulle komma i fråga, utan öfverlåtelsen vara gjord för evärdliga tider, därom var man fullkomligt ense och därom hade icke heller under de preliminära förhandlingarna rådt någon meningsskiljaktighet.")

German and Swedish-Norwegian diplomats would meet in Stockholm to discuss the matter and they would agree to sign the 1903 Treaty of Stockholm on the 23rd of June, almost exactly 100 years after the Treaty of Malmö. The treaty stipulated the relinquishing of all Swedish claims upon Wismar including their right to redeem the city every 100 years.

As Sweden-Norway dropped all claims on the city, Wismar formally was not a part of any country. It wasn't until Duke Freidrich IV marched into the city later that year (Note: Disputed when, either August or September.) to claim it for the Duchy of Mecklenburg-Schwerin that the city became finally German. He was joined by a 2,800-person big parade as well as 21 carriages, 86 cavalry men and 160 horses.

== Aftermath ==
Due to the transfer of Wismar to Germany in 1903, a memorial was erected called the "Schwedenstein" (English: Sweden stone) which features the coat of arms of Sweden, Mecklenburg, and Wismar. The stone was also erected due to the 100-year anniversary of the Treaty of Malmö. Traces of the Swedish era still remain in Wismar, notably in the form of the annually celebrated Schwedenfest (English: Sweden fest) every August. Furthermore, Wismar maintains ties to Sweden by being a twin city with Kalmar.

== See also ==
- Bodø affair
- Swedish Wismar
- Hvalen incident
