= Foreign relations of Kenya =

Kenya maintains relations with various countries around the world. Its closest ties are with its fellow Swahili-speaking neighbors in the African Great Lakes region. Swahili speaking neighbours mainly include countries in the East African Community such as Burundi, the DRC, Rwanda, South Sudan, Tanzania and Uganda.

Kenya's relations with other states vary. The government of Ethiopia established political links in the colonial period with Kenya's then British administration, and today it is one of several national bodies with a diplomatic presence in Nairobi. Relations with Somalia have historically been tense, although there has been some military co-ordination against insurgents.

Elsewhere, the Kenyan government has political ties with China, India, Pakistan, Russia, United Arab Emirates, and Brazil. It also maintains relations with Western countries, particularly the United Kingdom, although political and economic instabilities are often blamed on Western activities (e.g. colonialism, paternalistic engagement, and post-colonial resource exploitation).

== Diplomatic relations ==
List of countries which Kenya maintains diplomatic relations with:

#	Country	Date
1	United Kingdom	12 December 1963
2	Ethiopia	12 December 1963
3	France	12 December 1963
4	Ghana	12 December 1963
5	Israel	12 December 1963
6	Serbia	12 December 1963
7	Poland	13 December 1963
8	China	14 December 1963
9	India	14 December 1963
10	Germany	18 December 1963
11	Pakistan	31 January 1964
12	Czech Republic	January 1964
13	Sweden	January 1964
14	Netherlands	3 February 1964
15	South Korea	7 February 1964
16	Bulgaria	14 February 1964
17	Russia	14 February 1964
18	Norway	22 February 1964
19	Switzerland	28 February 1964
20	United States	2 March 1964
21	Egypt	7 March 1964
22	Hungary	21 March 1964
23	Belgium	29 April 1964
24	Canada	5 May 1964
25	Liberia	21 May 1964
26	Nigeria	28 May 1964
27	Japan	1 June 1964
28	Algeria	23 June 1964
29	Italy	7 July 1964
30	Ivory Coast	10 September 1964
31	Denmark	23 October 1964
32	Mali	4 November 1964
33	Austria	15 December 1964
34	Sudan	28 January 1965
35	Rwanda	11 June 1965
36	Burundi	12 June 1965
37	Finland	14 June 1965
—	Holy See	19 June 1965
38	Australia	23 August 1965
39	Malawi	28 September 1965
40	Argentina	31 December 1965
41	Malaysia	1965
42	Morocco	1965
43	Greece	8 December 1966
44	Spain	27 April 1967
45	Guinea	14 June 1967
46	Brazil	4 July 1967
47	Thailand	25 July 1967
48	Lebanon	16 August 1967
49	Botswana	30 October 1967
50	Zambia	5 December 1967
51	Somalia	17 December 1967
52	Turkey	30 March 1968
53	Kuwait	23 April 1968
54	Democratic Republic of the Congo	24 April 1968
55	Lesotho	20 June 1968
56	Romania	22 June 1968
57	Tunisia	26 November 1968
58	Iraq	14 April 1969
59	Saudi Arabia	12 May 1969
60	Senegal	13 March 1970
61	Venezuela	30 April 1970
62	Eswatini	18 May 1970
63	Yemen	15 August 1970
64	Sri Lanka	4 September 1970
65	Guyana	December 1970
66	Iran	3 October 1971
67	Cameroon	5 September 1972
68	Cyprus	1972
69	Iceland	30 October 1973
70	Colombia	27 January 1975
71	Nepal	3 June 1975
72	Philippines	4 July 1975
73	Chile	September 1975
74	Peru	25 February 1976
75	Oman	4 March 1976
76	Jamaica	19 March 1976
77	Gabon	10 July 1976
78	Mozambique	5 November 1976
79	Bangladesh	23 November 1976
80	Portugal	10 January 1977
81	Mexico	15 March 1977
82	Uganda	8 February 1978
83	Libya	7 November 1978
84	Sierra Leone	16 January 1979
85	Ireland	4 April 1979
86	Ecuador	12 October 1979
87	Indonesia	15 October 1979
88	Niger	12 May 1981
89	Benin	12 March 1982
90	Luxembourg	15 May 1982
91	United Arab Emirates	5 June 1982
92	New Zealand	9 June 1982
93	Uruguay	20 July 1982
94	Costa Rica	13 November 1982
95	Albania	2 February 1983
96	Zimbabwe	5 March 1983
97	Tanzania	13 December 1983
98	Djibouti	13 March 1984
99	Togo	9 April 1985
100	Angola	22 July 1985
101	Seychelles	10 January 1990
102	Namibia	21 March 1990
103	Singapore	30 September 1991
104	Slovakia	15 January 1993
105	Ukraine	5 May 1993
106	Armenia	13 July 1993
107	Eritrea	14 September 1993
108	Kazakhstan	15 November 1993
109	Belarus	17 November 1993
110	South Africa	12 April 1994
111	Cuba	19 October 1995
112	Maldives	23 October 1995
113	Vietnam	21 December 1995
114	Latvia	23 April 1996
115	Lithuania	28 July 1997
116	Myanmar	26 September 1997
117	Jordan	1998
118	Kyrgyzstan	12 December 2000
119	Estonia	31 October 2001
120	Burkina Faso	25 March 2003
121	Qatar	28 December 2003
122	Azerbaijan	28 May 2004
123	Mauritania	20 July 2004
124	Slovenia	3 November 2004
125	Malta	5 November 2004
126	Croatia	1 December 2004
—	Sahrawi Arab Democratic Republic	25 June 2005
127	North Macedonia	1 February 2006
128	Syria	23 April 2007
129	Chad	26 May 2007
—	Sovereign Military Order of Malta	14 September 2007
130	Dominican Republic	9 October 2007
—	State of Palestine	26 January 2008
131	Mauritius	16 April 2008
132	Brunei	11 August 2008
133	Guatemala	25 September 2008
134	Bosnia and Herzegovina	26 September 2008
135	North Korea	26 September 2008
136	Gambia	15 October 2008
137	Laos	11 December 2008
138	Paraguay	25 September 2009
139	Trinidad and Tobago	12 October 2009
140	Georgia	2 July 2010
141	Fiji	21 September 2010
142	Bahrain	25 September 2010
143	South Sudan	9 July 2011
144	Montenegro	6 October 2011
145	Cambodia	16 December 2011
146	Mongolia	22 March 2012
147	Republic of the Congo	28 August 2012
148	Barbados	3 September 2014
149	El Salvador	28 September 2015
150	Saint Kitts and Nevis	22 September 2016
151	Nicaragua	30 July 2019
152	Tajikistan	6 August 2019
153	Suriname	24 September 2019
154	Panama	26 September 2019
155	Central African Republic	28 November 2019
156	Saint Lucia	10 December 2019
157	Guinea-Bissau	7 January 2020
158	Dominica	1 July 2020
159	Saint Vincent and the Grenadines	12 August 2020
160	San Marino	12 May 2021
161	Honduras	23 September 2021
162	Andorra	16 February 2022
163	Moldova	1 March 2022
164	Liechtenstein	29 April 2022
165	Belize	22 June 2022
166	Antigua and Barbuda	23 June 2022
167	Turkmenistan	14 March 2023
168	Comoros	1 September 2023
169	Grenada	20 September 2023
170	Haiti	20 September 2023
171	Bahamas	19 January 2024
172	Uzbekistan	19 September 2025
173	Monaco	14 October 2025
174	Timor-Leste	16 March 2026
175	Solomon Islands	21 September 2026

== Bilateral relations ==
=== East African Community ===
Country	Formal relations established	Notes
Burundi		Main article: Burundi–Kenya relations Burundi is a partner of Kenya in many areas, particularly trade, security (military), education, agriculture and energy. In 2011, both countries signed a comprehensive bilateral agreement to promote development and technology transfer in agriculture, livestock and fisheries development between them. During the Burundian ethnic clashes, a significant number of Burundians took up refuge in Kenya. Burundi, along with Kenya, is one of the Swahili-speaking states in the African Great Lakes region.: Burundi has an embassy in Nairobi.; Kenya has an embassy in Bujumbura.
Democratic Republic of the Congo		Main article: Democratic Republic of the Congo–Kenya relations The DRC is a strategic partner of Kenya in many areas, particularly trade and security. The peace deal between the Government of the DRC and leaders of the M23 rebellion was brokered by multiple parties and was signed in Nairobi in late 2013. M23 was routed in a UN-backed offensive by government troops. Under the deal there would be no amnesty for those wanted for war crimes. The deal was hosted by Uhuru Kenyatta, the President of Kenya. By the end of 2014 both countries were to sign a Joint Commission for Cooperation. Under the agreement Kenya was to establish a consulate in Goma and DRC in Mombasa The deal would help deepen trade and investment between both countries. Both countries are inhabited by significant Swahili speaking populations, Swahili is the national language in both countries. Kenya and the DRC share some cultural similarities.: DR Congo has an embassy in Nairobi.; Kenya has an embassy in Kinshasa.
Rwanda	11 June 1965	Both countries established diplomatic relations on 11 June 1965 when first Ambassador of Rwanda to Kenya (resident in Kampala) Mr. Malahie Musabyimana presented his credentials to President Kenyatta. Main article: Kenya–Rwanda relations Kenya is a partner of Rwanda in many areas, particularly trade, security (military), education, agriculture and energy. It is estimated that there are about 100,000 Rwandese immigrants in Kenya. Both countries have on multiple occasions signed various memoranda of understanding. These MOUs involve co-operative technical assistance and development between the two countries. Kenya has a significant expat community in Rwanda.: Kenya has a high commission in Kigali.; Rwanda has a high commission in Nairobi.
South Sudan		Main article: Kenya–South Sudan relations South Sudan is a strategic partner of Kenya in many areas. Both countries have cultural similarities as many people from South Sudan lived in Kenya before independence. Kenya is said to have contributed a to South Sudan's independence. The Machakos Protocol signed in Kenya in 2002 saw a ceasefire signed between Sudan and the Southern Sudanese. It was the first of many agreements that led to the creation of Southern Sudan autonomous region which later on led to the independence of South Sudan in 2011. During the independence movement leaders of the freedom movement lived in Kenya. At the peak of the second Sudanese civil war Kenya hosted about 100,000 South Sudanese people.: Kenya has an embassy in Juba.; South Sudan has an embassy in Nairobi.
Tanzania	13 December 1983	Both countries established full diplomatic relations on 13 December 1983 Main article: Kenya–Tanzania relations Tanzania is a partner of Kenya in many areas, particularly trade, security (military), education, agriculture and energy. The first high commissions of Kenya in Tanzania and vice versa were opened after the independence of Kenya. However, after the breakup of the EAC in 1977, both countries severed diplomatic ties. The breakup of the first EAC which was founded in 1967 was brought about by ideological differences between Tanzania and Kenya. As it was during the cold war African countries were making decisions on whether to become socialist or capitalist. Kenya's leader Kenyatta was intent on making sure that Kenya wouldn't become socialist and Kenya stuck to capitalism. Tanzania on the other hand championed for Ujamaa, a major African socialist policy. Tanzania and Kenya resumed diplomatic ties in 1983. By that time, a lot of factors were slowing the idea of Ujamaa in Tanzania among them the war with Uganda and many other social factors. Today both countries enjoy healthy relations. Both countries are inhabited by the world's largest Swahili speaking populations, Swahili is the official and national language in both countries. Kenya and Tanzania share a lot of cultural similarities.: Kenya has a high commission in Dar-es-Salaam.; Tanzania has a high commission in Nairobi and a consulate-general in Mombasa.
Uganda	8 February 1978	Both countries established diplomatic relations on 8 February 1978 Main article: Kenya–Uganda relations The two East African Community countries are partners in many areas, particularly in the trade, infrastructure, security (military), education, agriculture and energy sectors. From 1961 to 1965, the two states along with Tanzania were united in the East African Common Services Organisation, a common market with a loose federal structure. Kenya and Uganda were also founding members of the original East African Community (EAC), which later collapsed due to ideological differences and territorial disputes within itself. On 7 July 2000, Kenya, Uganda, and Tanzania reestablished the EAC. It has contributed a great deal in improving trade and overall relations between Kenya and Uganda. The countries are both inhabited by significant Swahili-speaking populations, and share significant cultural similarities.: Kenya has a high commission in Kampala.; Uganda has a high commission in Nairobi.

=== Rest of Africa ===
Country	Formal relations established	Notes
Algeria	23 June 1964	Main article: Algeria–Kenya relations
Angola	22 July 1985	Both countries established diplomatic relations on 22 July 1985 when Kenya's Ambassador to Angola Mr. John Kaumau Kimani presented his credentials. Main article: Angola–Kenya relations: Angola has an embassy in Nairobi.; Kenya has an embassy in Luanda.
Botswana	30 October 1967	Both countries established diplomatic relations on 30 October 1967. Main article: Botswana–Kenya relations: Botswana has a high commission in Nairobi.; Kenya has a high commission in Gaborone.
Djibouti	13 March 1984	Both countries established diplomatic relations on 13 March 1984. Main article: Djibouti–Kenya relations: Djibouti has an embassy in Nairobi.; Kenya has an embassy in Djibouti City.
Egypt		Main article: Egypt–Kenya relations: Egypt has an embassy in Nairobi.; Kenya has an embassy in Cairo.
Ethiopia	26 June 1964	Both countries established diplomatic relations on 26 June 1964 and opened Ethiopian Embassy in Nairobi. Main article: Ethiopia–Kenya relations Relations between Kenya and Ethiopia date back to 1954, when the Ethiopian authorities under Haile Selassie I established an honorary consulate general in the British Kenya Colony. In 1961, prior to Kenya's independence, Ethiopia appointed its first ambassador to Kenya, and six years later Kenya opened an embassy in Addis Ababa. The border between the two countries is based on a treaty signed by Ethiopia and Kenya on 9 June 1970, which determines the present-day boundary, abrogating all previous boundary treaties. This border has been subjected to demarcation.: Ethiopia has an embassy in Nairobi.; Kenya has an embassy in Addis Ababa.
Ghana	16 December 1963	Both countries established diplomatic relations on 16 December 1963 Main article: Ghana–Kenya relations: Ghana has a high commission in Nairobi.; Kenya has a high commission in Accra.
Mozambique	5 November 1976	Both countries established diplomatic relations on 5 November 1976 when Ambassador of Kenya Hon. Kiyinda Nincola, has presented his credentials to President of Mozambique Samora Moises Machel. Main article: Kenya–Mozambique relations: Kenya has a high commission in Maputo.; Mozambique has a high commission in Nairobi.
Namibia	22 March 1990	Both countries established diplomatic relations on 22 March 1990 when was officially opened the Kenya High Commission in Windhoek. Main article: Kenya–Namibia relations: Kenya has a high commission in Windhoek.; Namibia is accredited to Kenya from its high commission in Dar-es-Salaam, Tanzania.
Nigeria		Main article: Kenya–Nigeria relations: Kenya has a high commission in Abuja.; Nigeria has a high commission in Nairobi.
Somalia		Main article: Kenya–Somalia relations Relations between Kenya and Somalia have historically been tense. Agitations over self-determination in the Somali-inhabited Northern Frontier District culminated in the Shifta War during the 1960s. Although the conflict ended in a cease-fire, Somalis in the region still identify and maintain close ties with their kin in Somalia. In October 2011, a coordinated operation between the Somali military and the Kenyan military began against the Al-Shabaab group of insurgents in southern Somalia. The mission was officially led by the Somali army, with the Kenyan forces providing a support role. In early June 2012, Kenyan troops were formally integrated into AMISOM.: Kenya is accredited to Somalia from its Ministry of Foreign Affairs based in Nairobi.; Somalia has an embassy in Nairobi.
South Africa	12 April 1994	Both countries established diplomatic relations on 12 April 1994 Main article: Kenya–South Africa relations: Kenya has a high commission in Pretoria.; South Africa has a high commission in Nairobi.
Sudan	28 January 1965	Both countries established diplomatic relations on 28 January 1965 when was accredited first ambassador of Sudan to Kenya Sayed Mohammed Mirghani Main article: Kenya–Sudan relations: Kenya has an embassy in Khartoum.; Sudan has an embassy in Nairobi.
Zambia		Main article: Kenya–Zambia relations: Kenya has a high commission in Lusaka.; Zambia has a high commission in Nairobi.
Zimbabwe		Main article: Kenya–Zimbabwe relations: Kenya has an embassy in Harare.; Zimbabwe has an embassy in Nairobi.

=== Americas ===
Country	Formal relations established	Notes
Barbados	3 September 2014	Both countries established diplomatic relations on 3 September 2014 Main article: Barbados–Kenya relations: During Prime Minister's Mottley's visit in late 2019 she opened the CARICOM office in Nairobi, Kenya which will be a joint diplomatic mission for Caribbean countries.
Brazil	4 July 1967	Both countries established diplomatic relations on 4 July 1967 Main article: Brazil–Kenya relations: Brazil has an embassy in Nairobi.; Kenya has an embassy in Brasília.
Canada	5 May 1964	Both countries established diplomatic relations on 5 May 1964 Main article: Canada–Kenya relations: Canada has a high commission in Nairobi.; Kenya has a high commission in Ottawa.
Chile	September 1975	Both countries established diplomatic relations in September 1975 Main article: Chile–Kenya relations: Chile has an embassy in Nairobi.; Kenya is accredited to Chile from its embassy in Brasília, Brazil.
Colombia	27 January 1975	Both countries established diplomatic relations on 27 January 1975 Main article: Colombia–Kenya relations: Colombia has an embassy in Nairobi.; Kenya is accredited to Colombia from its embassy in Brasília, Brazil.
Cuba	19 October 1995	Both countries established diplomatic relations on 19 October 1995 Main article: Cuba–Kenya relations: Cuba has an embassy in Nairobi.; Kenya is accredited to Cuba from its high commission in Kingston, Jamaica.
Haiti	20 September 2023	Both countries established diplomatic relations on 20 September 2023. Main article: Haiti–Kenya relations: Haiti is accredited to Kenya from its embassy in Pretoria, South Africa.; Kenya has a consulate-general in Port-au-Prince.
Jamaica	19 March 1976	Both countries established diplomatic relations on 19 March 1976 Main article: Jamaica–Kenya relations President Kenyatta made a state visit in August 2019. He met and held talks with Prime Minister Holness. Kenyatta was the main guest for the celebration of the 57th Independence Day Jamaica. Both leaders (Holness and Kenyatta) also launched the celebrations to mark the International Decade for People of African Descent.: Jamaica is accredited to Kenya from its high commission in Pretoria, South Africa.; Kenya has a high commission in Kingston.
Mexico	15 March 1977	Both countries established diplomatic relations on 15 March 1977 Main article: Kenya–Mexico relations: Kenya has an embassy in Mexico City.; Mexico has an embassy in Nairobi.
United States	12 December 1963	Main article: Kenya–United States relations After Kenya's independence on 12 December 1963, the United States immediately recognized the new nation and moved to establish diplomatic relations. The embassy in Nairobi was opened on 12 December 1963: Kenya has an embassy in Washington, DC and consulates-general in Los Angeles and New York City.; United States has an embassy in Nairobi.
Venezuela	30 April 1970	Both countries established diplomatic relations on 30 April 1970 Main article: Kenya–Venezuela relations: Kenya is accredited to Venezuela from its embassy in Brasília, Brazil.; Venezuela has an embassy in Nairobi.

=== Asia ===
Country	Formal relations established	Notes
Azerbaijan	28 May 2004	Main Article: Azerbaijan-Kenya relations: Diplomatic relations between the Republic of Azerbaijan and the Republic of Kenya were established on 28 May 2004; Cooperation between the two countries covers such areas as tourism, science, education, and so on.
China	14 December 1963	Both countries established diplomatic relations on 14 December 1963 Main article: China–Kenya relations Chinese-Kenyan relations date back to 14 December 1963, two days after the formal establishment of Kenyan independence, when China became the fourth country to open an embassy in Nairobi. Military exchange between the two countries has been increasing in the past decade. General Liu Jingsong, commander of the Lanzhou Military Region, led China's first military delegation to Kenya in December 1996; Major General Nick Leshan, commander of the Kenyan air force, paid a return visit in 1997. Kenyan president Mwai Kibaki visited Beijing in August 2005.: China has an embassy in Nairobi.; Kenya has an embassy in Beijing.
India	14 December 1963	Both countries established diplomatic relations on 14 December 1963 Main article: India–Kenya relations: India has a High Commission in Nairobi.; Kenya has a High Commission in New Delhi.
Indonesia	15 October 1979	Both countries established diplomatic relations in 15 October 1979 Main article: Indonesia–Kenya relations: Indonesia has an embassy in Nairobi.; Kenya has an embassy in Jakarta.
Iran	3 October 1971	Both countries established diplomatic relations on 3 October 1971. Main article: Iran–Kenya relations: Iran has an embassy in Nairobi.; Kenya has an embassy in Tehran.
Israel	12 December 1963	Both countries established diplomatic relations on 12 December 1963 and opened Embassy of Israel in Nairobi. Kenya broken diplomatic relations with Israel on 1 November 1973. Diplomatic relations were re-established on 23 December 1988. Main article: Israel–Kenya relations: Israel has an embassy in Nairobi.; Kenya has an embassy in Tel Aviv.
Japan		Main article: Japan–Kenya relations: Japan has an embassy in Nairobi.; Kenya has an embassy in Tokyo.
Malaysia	1965	Both countries established diplomatic relations in 1965 Main article: Kenya–Malaysia relations: Kenya has a high commission in Kuala Lumpur.; Malaysia has a high commission in Nairobi.
Oman	4 March 1976	Both countries established diplomatic relations on 4 March 1976 Main article: Kenya–Oman relations: Kenya has an embassy in Muscat.; Oman has an embassy in Nairobi.
Pakistan	31 January 1964	Both countries established diplomatic relations on 31 January 1964 when Mr. K.K.Panni, High Commissioner of Pakistan to Kenya presented his credentials. Main article: Kenya–Pakistan relations Relations between Pakistan and Kenya were established in the 1960s, when Pakistan expressed its support for Kenya in obtaining independence from British rule. Ever since, relations between the two nations have been warm; with both countries having had discussed previously in the Pakistan-Kenya Joint Ministerial Commission session which was hosted in Nairobi in 2004, about boosting bilateral trade and economic relations.: Kenya has a high commission in Islamabad.; Pakistan has a high commission in Nairobi.
Palestine		Both countries maintain diplomatic relations as the State of Palestine maintains an embassy in Nairobi.
Philippines	20 May 1975	Both countries established diplomatic relations on 20 May 1975 The Philippines and Kenya have forged a historic agreement to strengthen ties between both countries. Under a Joint Commission on Bilateral Cooperation(JCBC): Kenya is accredited to the Philippines from its embassy in Jakarta, Indonesia.; The Philippines has an embassy in Nairobi.
Qatar	28 December 2003	Both countries established diplomatic relations on 28 December 2003. Main article: Kenya–Qatar relations: Kenya has an embassy in Doha.; Qatar has an embassy in Nairobi.
Saudi Arabia	12 May 1969	Both countries established diplomatic relations on 12 May 1969 when Kenya's Ambassador to Saudi Arabia, Japheth Kimanzi Ilako, has presented his credentials to King Faisal. Main article: Kenya–Saudi Arabia relations: Kenya has an embassy in Riyadh.; Saudi Arabia has an embassy in Nairobi.
South Korea	7 February 1964	Both countries established diplomatic relations on 7 February 1964 Main article: Kenya–South Korea relations
Turkey	30 March 1968	Both countries established diplomatic relations on 30 March 1968 Main article: Kenya–Turkey relations: Kenya has an embassy in Ankara.; Turkey has an embassy in Nairobi.; Trade volume between the two countries was US$234 million in 2019.; There are direct flights from Istanbul to Nairobi since 20 February 2009.
United Arab Emirates	5 June 1982	Both countries established diplomatic relations on 5 June 1982 Main article: Kenya–United Arab Emirates relations: Kenya has an embassy in Abu Dhabi and a consulate-general in Dubai.; United Arab Emirates has an embassy in Nairobi.

== Europe ==
Country	Formal relations established	Notes
Denmark	23 October 1964	Both countries established diplomatic relations on 23 October 1964 when was accredited first Denmark's ambassador to Kenya Birger Abrahamson Main article: Denmark-Kenya relations: Denmark has an embassy in Nairobi.; Kenya is accredited to Denmark from its embassy in Stockholm, Sweden.
Finland	14 June 1965	Both countries established diplomatic relations on 14 June 1965 Main article: Finland–Kenya relations: Finland has an embassy in Nairobi.; Kenya is accredited to Finland from its embassy in Stockholm, Sweden.
France	12 December 1963	Both countries established diplomatic relations on 12 December 1963 Main article: France–Kenya relations: France has an embassy in Nairobi.; Kenya has an embassy in Paris.
Germany	18 December 1963	Both countries established diplomatic relations on 18 December 1963 Main article: Germany–Kenya relations: Germany has an embassy in Nairobi.; Kenya has an embassy in Berlin.
Greece	8 December 1966	Both countries established diplomatic relations on 8 December 1966 when accredited first ambassador of Greece to Kenya with residence in Nairobi Mr. George C. Papadopoulos. Main article: Greece-Kenya relations: Greece has an embassy in Nairobi and an honorary consulate in Mombasa.; Kenya is accredited to Greece from its embassy in Rome, Italy and maintains an honorary consulate in Athens.; Greek Ministry of Foreign Affairs about relations with Kenya; Consulate of the Republic of Kenya in Hellenic Republic
Italy		Main article: Italy–Kenya relations: Italy has an embassy in Nairobi.; Kenya has an embassy in Rome.
Netherlands	3 February 1964	Both countries established diplomatic relations on 3 February 1964 when Mr. W. P. L. G. de Boer, the first Ambassador of the Netherlands to Kenya presented his credentials. Main article: Kenya–Netherlands relations: Kenya has an embassy in The Hague.; Netherlands has an embassy in Nairobi.
Norway	22 February 1964	Both countries established diplomatic relations on 22 February 1964 Main article: Kenya–Norway relations: Kenya is accredited to Norway from its embassy in Stockholm, Sweden.; Norway has an embassy in Nairobi.
Poland	13 December 1963	Both countries established diplomatic relations on 13 December 1963 Main article: Kenya–Poland relations: Kenya is accredited to Poland from its embassy in Berlin, Germany.; Poland has an embassy in Nairobi.
Portugal	10 January 1977	Both countries established diplomatic relations on 10 January 1977: Kenya is accredited to Portugal from its embassy in Paris, France.; Portugal has an embassy in Nairobi.
Russia	14 December 1963	Both countries established diplomatic relations on 14 December 1963 Main article: Kenya–Russia relations: Russia has an embassy in Nairobi.; Kenya has an embassy in Moscow.
Spain	27 April 1967	Both countries established diplomatic relations on 27 April 1967 Main article: Kenya-Spain relations: Kenya has an embassy in Madrid.; Spain has an embassy in Nairobi.
Sweden	January 1964	Both countries established diplomatic relations in 1964 Main article: Kenya–Sweden relations: Kenya has an embassy in Stockholm.; Sweden has an embassy in Nairobi.
Switzerland	28 February 1964	Both countries established diplomatic relations on 28 February 1964 when appointed first Ambassador of Switzerland to Kenya (resident in Addis Ababa) Mr. Roger Dürr Main article: Kenya–Switzerland relations: Kenya has an embassy in Bern.; Switzerland has an embassy in Nairobi
United Kingdom	1963	Main article: Kenya–United Kingdom relations Kenyan President William Ruto with British Prime Minister Keir Starmer at a United Nations General Assembly in New York City, September 2024. Kenya established diplomatic relations with the United Kingdom in 1963.: Kenya maintains a high commission in London.; The United Kingdom is accredited to Kenya through its high commission in Nairobi.; The UK governed Kenya from 1895 to 1963, when it achieved full independence. Both countries share common membership of the Commonwealth, the World Health Organization, and the World Trade Organization. Bilaterally the two countries have an Economic Partnership Agreement, a Defence Cooperation Agreement, a Development Partnership, a Double Taxation Agreement, and an Investment Agreement. In 1895, Britain established the East Africa Protectorate (British East Africa), centred in present-day Kenya and the larger African Great Lakes region. Four years later, the British founded the settlement of Nairobi as a simple rail depot on the railway linking Mombasa to Uganda. The town quickly grew to become the capital of British East Africa in 1905, with Lieutenant Colonel J. Hayes Sadler as the first governor and commander in chief. In 1920, the East Africa Protectorate was transformed into a British crown colony, the Kenya Colony. In 1952, Elizabeth II, ascended the throne while visiting Kenya on her and the Duke of Edinburgh's tour of the British Empire and Commonwealth. Two years later, Britain founded the Nairobi Securities Exchange as a voluntary association of stockbrokers in the European community registered under the Societies Act.

== Oceania ==
Country	Formal relations established	Notes
Australia	23 August 1965	Both countries established diplomatic relations on 23 August 1965 Main article: Australia–Kenya relations: Australia has a high commission in Nairobi.; Kenya has a high commission in Canberra.

== Kenya and the Commonwealth of Nations ==
Kenya has been a member state of the Commonwealth of Nations since 1963, when it became independent. The nation became a republic in the Commonwealth of Nations in 1964.

Kenya is also a member of the UN and hosts the UN Office in Nairobi, which is the UN Headquarters in Africa. The office was established in 1996.

== International trips made by presidents of Kenya ==
=== Uhuru Kenyatta ===
Countries visited by Kenyatta during his presidency 2013-2022

Uhuru Kenyatta made a 119 International trips to 52 countries during his presidency. The president served two full 5-year terms and made more international official visits than any of his predecessors. Kenyatta mainly made a majority of his visits within Africa and also attended various business forums and multi-lateral international events around the world.

=== William Ruto ===
Countries visited by William Ruto during his presidency

William Ruto made his first international trip in September 2022 since he began his presidency on 13 September 2022.

== See also ==
- List of diplomatic missions of Kenya
- List of diplomatic missions in Kenya
