= Kenya–Morocco relations =

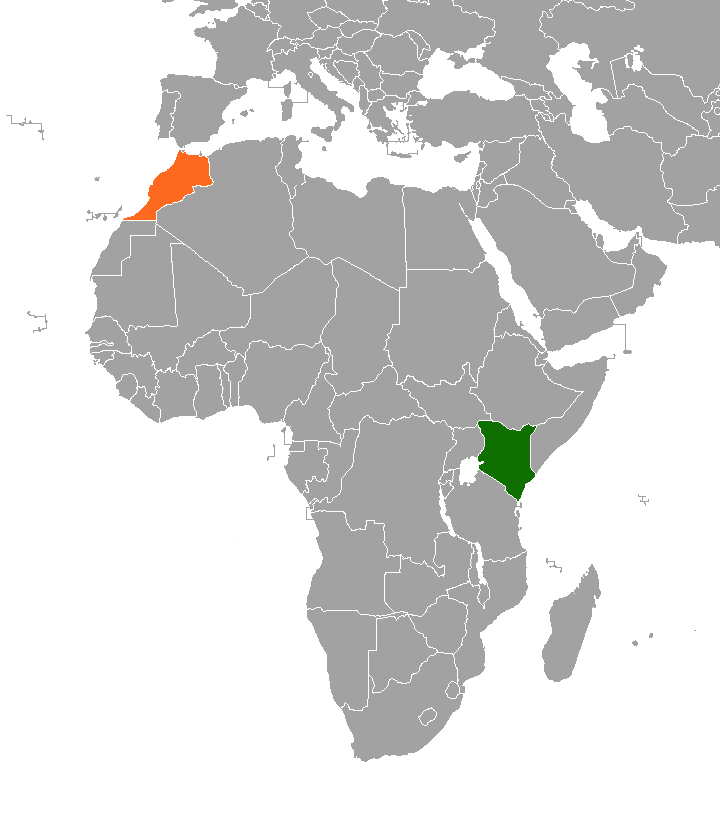
- Kenya: Morocco

Kenya–Morocco relations are bilateral relations between Kenya and Morocco.

== Development cooperation ==
Kenya signed a trade pact with Morocco to increase trade between both countries. The two territories' governments also signed an agreement that allows direct flights between both nations.

== Trade ==
Trade between both countries has been on the rise since 1998, with Kenya selling goods worth Kes.1.5 million ($20,000). In the same year, it imported goods worth Kes.13 million ($150,000) from Morocco.

In 2011, Kenya exported goods worth Kes.305 million ($3.3 million) to Morocco, where trade had radically increased while imports from Morocco were at a high of Kes.3.4 billion ($37.3 million). However, in 2012, trade dropped as exports to Morocco hit Kes.283 million ($3.1 million), while imports from Morocco were worth Kes.312 million ($3.4 million).

In November 2014, The Speaker Of The Kenyan Senate, David Ekwe Ethuro visited Morocco to boost bilateral ties between both countries. The Speaker met with Moroccan Prime Minister Abdelilah Benkirane they discussed multiple issued including higher education scholarships in medical and engineering fields. Benkirane also said that Morocco was interested in deepening cooperation with other African countries and in helping spur development on the continent.

== Diplomatic missions ==
Morocco maintains an embassy in Nairobi.

In February 2014 when the Sahrawi Arab Democratic Republic opened an embassy in Nairobi, Kenya had a diplomatic row with Morocco over the matter.

In May 2025 Kenya recognized Morocco's sovereignty over the disputed Western Sahara, supporting Morocco's plan to grant Western Sahara autonomy. Kenya also opened an official embassy in Rabat. Kenyan Foreign Minister noted that Kenya, as part of closer relations, wanted to export more tea, coffee and fresh produce to Morocco to balance its trade.

== See also ==
- Foreign relations of Kenya
- Foreign relations of Morocco
