= Kenya–Sweden relations =

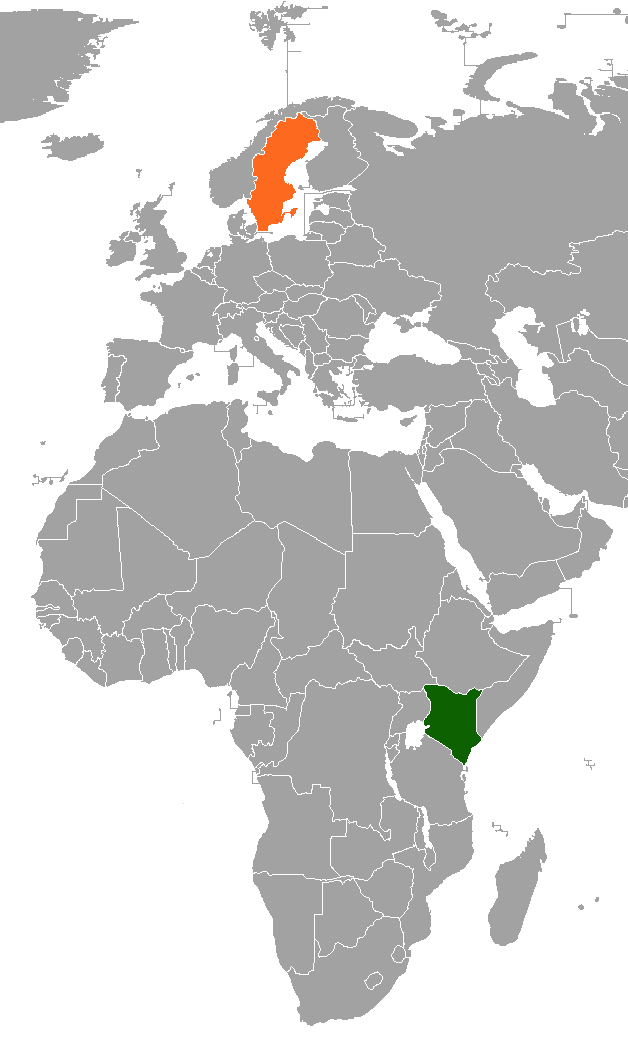
- Kenya: Sweden

Kenya–Sweden relations refer to the current and historical relationship between Kenya and Sweden.

== Political relations ==
- 1921 - A career consulate is established for British East Africa, and a vice-consulate is established in Mombasa.
- 1962 - The consulate is upgraded to a consulate general
- 1963 - Kenya gains independence, and Sweden recognizes it immediately.
- 1964 - Sweden appoints Otto Rathsman as ambassador to Kenya, and the consulate general becomes an embassy.
- 1969 - Sweden supports African liberation movements, followed by Finland and Norway.
- 1992 - Kenya introduces a multi-party democratic system.
- 1994 - Nordic countries provide $1,500,000,000 in humanitarian aid to Southern Africa over the previous 25 years, with 40% directly supporting liberation movements.
- 2007 - A Swedish Trade Office in Nairobi is established, overseeing multiple East African markets.
- 2016 - Sweden aims to strengthen Kenya democratic institutions at national and local levels.
- 2016 - Sweden focuses on strengthening Kenyan civil society, media, and key institutions.
- 2022 - President Uhuru Kenyatta makes an international presidential trip to Stockholm for the Stockholm+50 International environment meeting.
- 2023 - Ambassador Diana Kiambuthi welcomes Kenyan participants of a welcome meeting in Stockholm.
- 2024 - Kenya’s Defence Cabinet Secretary Aden Duale meets Sweden’s State Secretary for Foreign Affairs, Jan Knutsson. Both nations reaffirm their commitment to security collaboration in Africa.

== Military relations ==
- 2015 - Sweden acknowledges Kenya’s key role in regional peace and stability.
- 2016 - Sweden aims to take conflict prevention initiatives in Kenyan society.
- 2016 - Radicalization, terrorism, and crime continue to impact Kenyan security.
- 2016 - Sweden attempts to help control illegal arms flows.
- 2021 - Nordic countries pledge $4,960,000,000 over the previous 9 years for African peace & security efforts.
- 2021 - Sweden focuses on APSA, WPS, conflict prevention, and human rights in Africa’s fragile regions.
- 2024 - Kenya and Sweden discuss strengtheninh peacekeeping efforts in the Great Lakes and Horn of Africa.
- 2024 - Kenya and Sweden review the EU's role in Somalia post-ATMIS, and its impact on regional security.

== Economic relations ==
- 1973 - Kenya and Sweden sign a double tax avoidance agreement.
- 2006 - Nordic countries support African exports via the Aid for Trade Initiative.
- 2009 - Swedfund opens a regional office in Nairobi.
- 2010 - East African Common Market takes effect, boosting international trade.
- 2012 - Trade between Kenya and Sweden increases by 310% over 9 years.
- 2012 - Kenya exports €47,340,000 to Sweden, and Sweden exports €61,000,000 to Kenya.
- 2012 - Over 50 Swedish multinational corporations operate in Kenya, with the majority managing their African operations from Nairobi.
- 2012 - Sweden provides €8,700,000 in humanitarian aid and €50,200,000 in development support to Kenya.
- 2014 - Kenya is reclassified as a lower middle-income country.
- 2015 - Swedish trade with Africa is valued at $4,900,000,000.
- 2016 - Sweden aims to transition from an aid relationship with Kenya to a broader economic one.
- 2016 - Sweden attempts to promote productive employment for women and the youth.
- 2025 - Kenyan exports to Sweden include coffee, cut flowers, fruits, and vegetables. Swedish exports to Kenya include telecom equipment, paper, machinery, medical equipment, and vehicles.

== Cultural relations ==
- 1970 - Nordic countries provide major humanitarian aid to liberation movements in Southern Africa.
- 2015 - Sweden shows support for Kenya’s Vision 2030 goals for economic, social, and political development.
- 2016 - Sweden aims to strengthen natural resource and ecosystem management in Kenya.
- 2016 - Kenyan and Swedish government cooperate in governance, human rights, gender equality, trade, and urban development.
- 2016 - Sweden attempts to improve Kenya access to water, sanitation, and social protection.
- 2023 - Networking and knowledge-sharing between Kenyan exporters and Swedish businesses is encouraged.
- 2025 - Sweden's strong reputation in Kenya boosts the businesses there.

== Diplomatic missions ==
Kenya has an embassy in Stockholm. Sweden has an embassy in Nairobi.

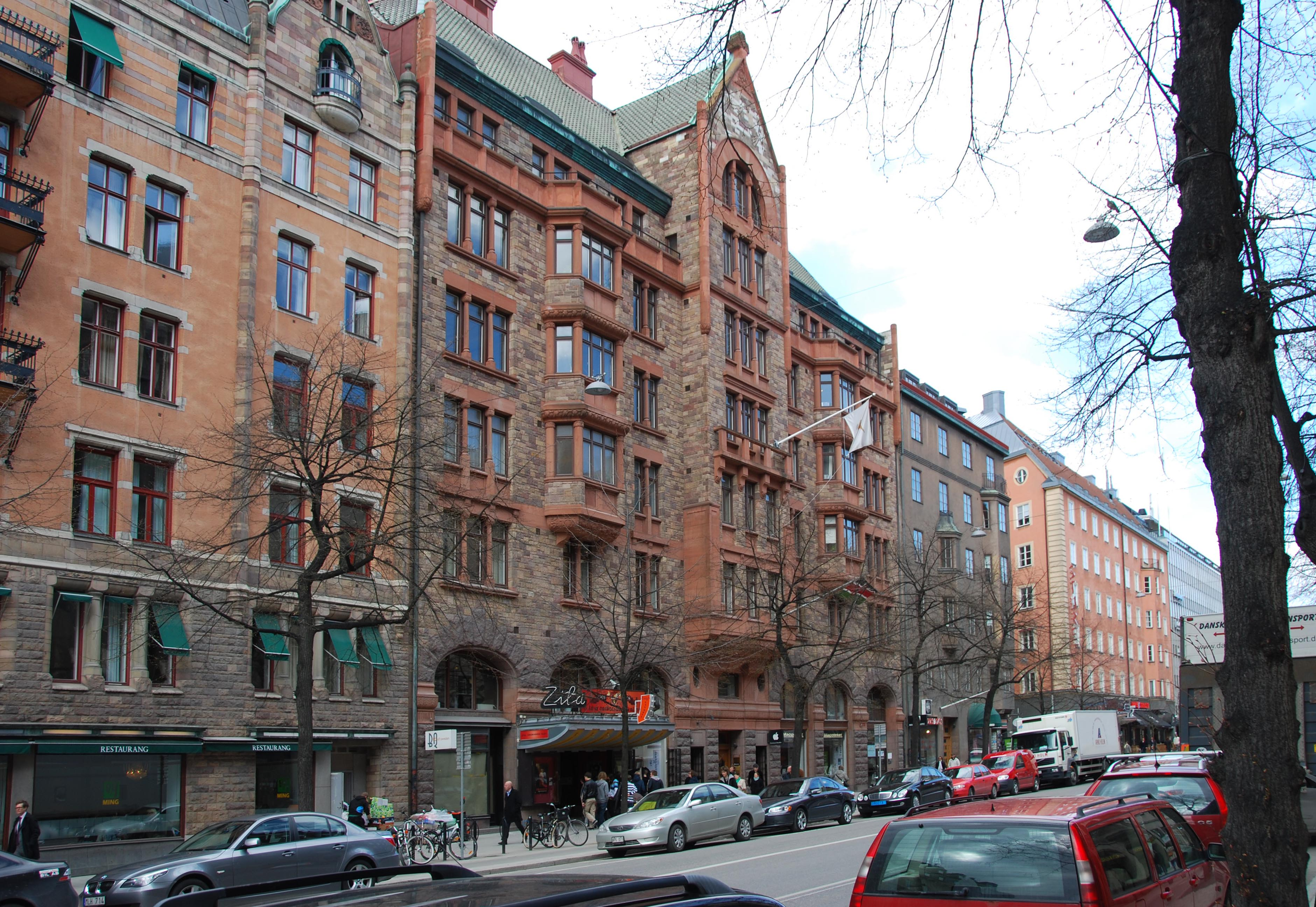
Embassy of Kenya in Stockholm

== See also ==
- Foreign relations of Kenya
- Foreign relations of Sweden
