= Kenya–Switzerland relations =

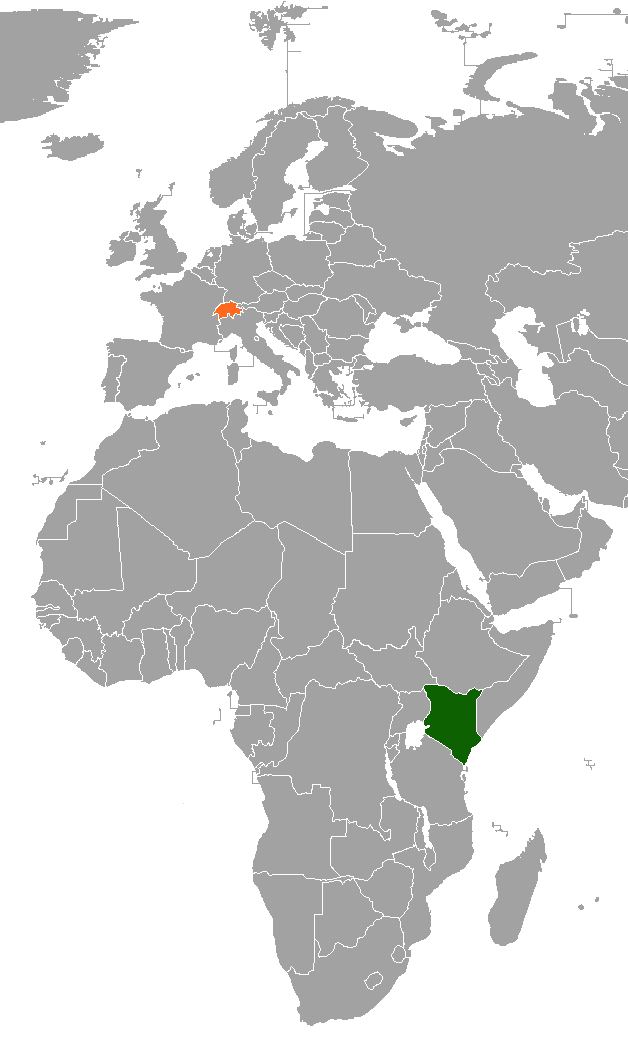
- Kenya: Switzerland

Kenya–Switzerland relations are bilateral relations between Kenya and Switzerland.

== History ==
Switzerland recognised an independent Kenya in 1963 and diplomatic relations were established in 1964, which is when Switzerland opened its Nairobi Embassy.

Presently, relations between both countries are cordial.

== Development cooperation ==
The Swiss Agency for Development and Cooperation (SDC) office for the Horn of Africa is based in Nairobi.

For the 2013–2016 Cooperation Strategy for the Horn of Africa, the SDC has set aside KES. 14.44 billion (CHF. 140 million)

Key areas for Kenya and Swiss cooperation are:

- Humanitarian aid
- Food security/Environmental protection

== Economic relations ==
In 2013, Kenya was Switzerland's 5th largest trade partner in Sub-Saharan Africa.

Total trade during that year was KES. 11.1 billion (CHF. 108 million).

Many Swiss nationals visit Kenya yearly. As of 2013, 937 Swiss nationals reside in Kenya .

Kenya's main exports to Switzerland include: flowers, tea and coffee.

Switzerland's main exports to Kenya include: pharmaceuticals and chemical products.

== Resident diplomatic missions ==
- Kenya has an embassy in Bern.
- Switzerland has an embassy in Nairobi.

== See also ==
- Foreign relations of Kenya
- Foreign relations of Switzerland
