= Finland–Kenya relations =

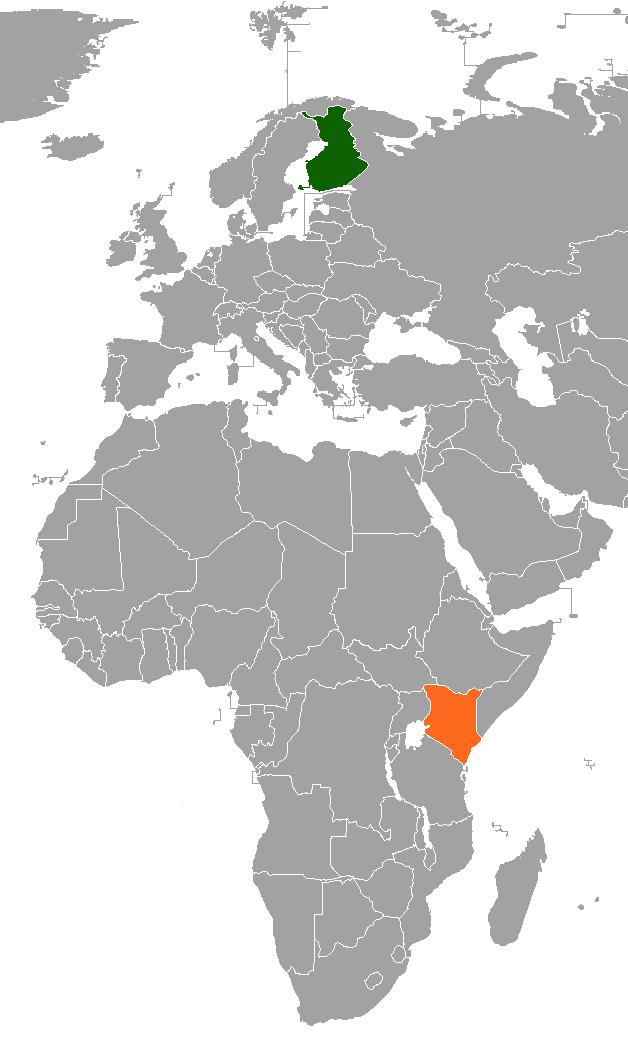
- Finland: Kenya

Finland and Kenya established diplomatic relations on June 14, 1965.

== History ==
Finland recognised Kenya on December 13, 1963. Both countries established diplomatic relations on June 14, 1965. The 1960s had Finland expand its presence in Kenya due to favourable economic conditions and started to support Kenya in the 1960s through economic loans and donation, working to fund development as part of an effort to increase cooperation between Nordic countries and the rest of the world.

In May 2025, Finnish President Alex Stubb visited Kenya

In the May 2025, meeting with the Finnish Foreign Minister Elina Valtonen, Kenya sought after Finland's support for Nairobi as the host for the Global Plastic Pollution Treaty. Kenya argued that the changing demography of the globe meant that the international community should "make space" for Africa.

== Development cooperation ==
In 2014, total development assistance stood at €13.9 million.

Through development assistance in Kenya, the Finnish government hopes to achieve:

- A society that accounts for human rights
- Poverty reduction
- Improve management of forest and water resources

To achieve this,

- A Local Cooperation Fund (LCF) has been set up, the fund is granted to NGOs involved in achieving good governance and human rights. A total of €11.6 million has been set to achieve this between 2013 and 2016.
- €24.8 million to develop agriculture in Kenya.
- €21.4 million in 2013–2016 has been reserved to improve management of forest and water resources.

== Trade ==
In 2013, trade between Finland and Kenya stood at €35 million. Kenya exported goods worth €17 million to Finland and in turn Finland exported goods worth €18 million. Kenya exported goods consisting of horticultural products, tea, and coffee. Finland mainly exported information communication technology and power plant equipment.

In 2014, both countries also signed a double taxation pact to promote trade and investment.

In 2013, 2,000 Finns visited Kenya while the Kenyan community in Finland stands at about 700.

== Resident diplomatic missions ==
- Finland has an embassy in Nairobi and an honorary consulate in Mombasa.
- Kenya is accredited to Finland from its embassy in Stockholm, Sweden.

== See also ==
- Foreign relations of Finland
- Foreign relations of Kenya
