= Kenya–Malaysia relations =

- Kenya: Malaysia

Kenya–Malaysia relations refers to the bilateral relations between Kenya and Malaysia. Kenya has had a high commission in Kuala Lumpur since in 1996. Malaysia opened a high commission in Nairobi in 2005. Both countries are members of the Commonwealth of Nations.

== History ==
While Malaysia's early diplomatic efforts in Kenya, like the 1964 mission by Lee Kuan Yew, laid a strong foundation, the relationship has evolved to focus on economic and developmental cooperation. Since the 2007 meeting between Prime Minister Abdullah Ahmad Badawi and President Mwai Kibaki, which focused on infrastructure projects, bilateral relations have continued to deepen.

=== Continued Diplomatic and Economic Engagement ===
Since 2007, high-level visits and agreements have continued to strengthen ties between Malaysia and Kenya. In 2011, Kenya's Vice-President, Kalonzo Musyoka, expressed his country's desire to learn from Malaysia's expertise in ICT and infrastructure development. The two nations have also focused on boosting economic partnerships and narrowing the trade imbalance, which heavily favors Malaysia. In 2014, bilateral trade was valued at approximately $742.5 million (RM 3.143 billion), with Malaysia's exports to Kenya being significantly higher than its imports. Key Malaysian exports to Kenya include palm oil, petroleum products, and electronics, while Kenya primarily exports tea, textiles

=== Recent Developments ===
Recent years have seen a number of notable collaborations and events that highlight the ongoing relationship:

- A sister-port agreement was signed between the Port Klang Authority in Malaysia and the Kenya Ports Authority in 2006.
- In November 2024, the High Commissioner of Malaysia to Kenya, H.E. Ruzaimi Mohamad, announced the inaugural direct, non-stop flight between Kuala Lumpur and Nairobi via AirAsia X, calling it a "significant milestone" for bilateral relations.
- A Malaysian business delegation visited Kenya in May 2019 to explore business opportunities.
- In 2023, Malaysia's Deputy Prime Minister and Minister of Plantation and Commodities, Dato' Sri Haji Fadillah bin Haji Yusof, led a delegation to Kenya for the Malaysia Palm Oil Forum-East Africa 2023, demonstrating a continued focus on key trade commodities.

== Economic relations ==
Levels of trade between the two countries are only moderate, with Malaysia exporting more to Kenya than the African nation exports in return. In 2011, Kenyan Vice-President Kalonzo Musyoka stated that his country was keen to learn from Malaysia about ICT and infrastructure development.

== Trade ==
In 2014, bilateral trade was worth KES. 75.096 billion (US$742.5 million) RM. 3.143 billion.

Kenya exported goods worth KES. 556 million (US$5.5 million) RM. 23.7 million to Malaysia. Malaysia exported goods worth KES. 74.54 billion (US$737 million) RM 3.18 billion in the same year.

Kenya's main exports to Malaysia were: tea, textile articles, tobacco products, vegetables, fruits and nuts.

Malaysia's main exports to Kenya were: palm oil, petroleum oils, furniture, articles of apparel and clothing accessories, telecommunications equipment, electronic and electrical goods, industrial machinery, steam boilers, and rubber tyres.

== Travel ==
On November 26, 2006, Port Klang Authority signed a sister-port agreement with Kenya Ports Authority.

Direct, non-stop flights between Malaysia and Kenya began with the inaugural AirAsia X flight from Kuala Lumpur to Nairobi on 16 November 2024. Ruzaimi Mohamad, the High Commissioner of Malaysia to Kenya, stated that the new service "is a significant milestone in our relations."

== See also ==
- Foreign relations of Kenya
- Foreign relations of Malaysia
