= Azerbaijan–Kenya relations =

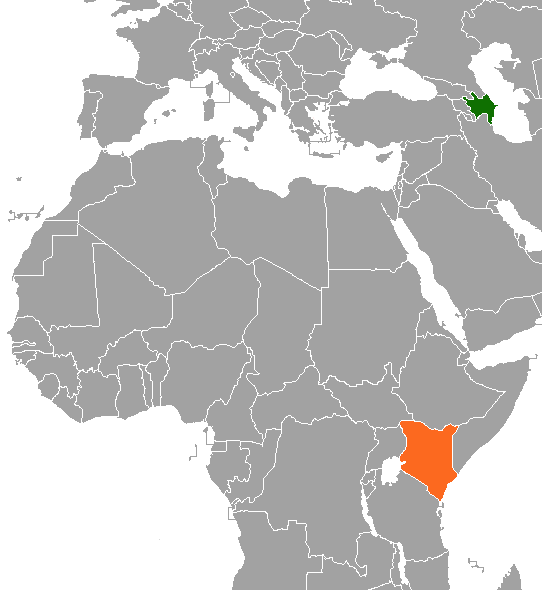

- Azerbaijan: Kenya

Azerbaijan–Kenya relations refer to the bilateral relations between Azerbaijan and Kenya. Kenya has a non-resident ambassador in Tehran. The first and current resident Azerbaijani ambassador to Kenya is Sultan Hajiyev. Azerbaijan has an embassy in Nairobi.

Cooperation between the two countries covers such areas as tourism, science, education, and so on.

== Diplomatic relations ==
In June 2004, Azerbaijan and Kenya signed a joint communique establishing diplomatic relations.

Azerbaijan's Ambassador to Kenya is Sultan Hajiyev.

== High-level visits ==
On 29 June 2012, the Kenyan Prime Minister's spouse, Ida Odinga, visited Azerbaijan to participate in the Crans Montana Forum held in Baku.

On 5–6 May 2017, Kenya's Minister of Sport, Culture and Art Hasan Vario Arero visited Azerbaijan to attend the World Forum on Intercultural Dialogue held in Baku. In December 2018, t he president of East African youth Parliament Jeremiah Mumo Kisangau visited Baku to attend Inter Parliamentary Union (IPU) where he was one of main speakers.

== Economic cooperation ==
Kenya's exports to Azerbaijan are based on raw materials, agricultural products, and so on.

According to statistical data of the State Customs Committee of Azerbaijan, in January–September 2016, the mutual trade turnover amounted to 617.79 thousand US dollars. The volume of imports increased by 14.3 times.

According to statistics from the UN trade office (COMTRADE), in 2019, the volume of Azerbaijan's exports to Kenya amounted to 354 thousand US dollars. The basis of Azerbaijan's export to Kenya is textiles.

Nargiz Eyvazova, Deputy Chairman of the organization for European integration of youth of Azerbaijan, represented Azerbaijan at the young leaders forum held in Nairobi in March 2012.

== See also ==
- Foreign relations of Azerbaijan
- Foreign relations of Kenya
