= Iran–Kenya relations =

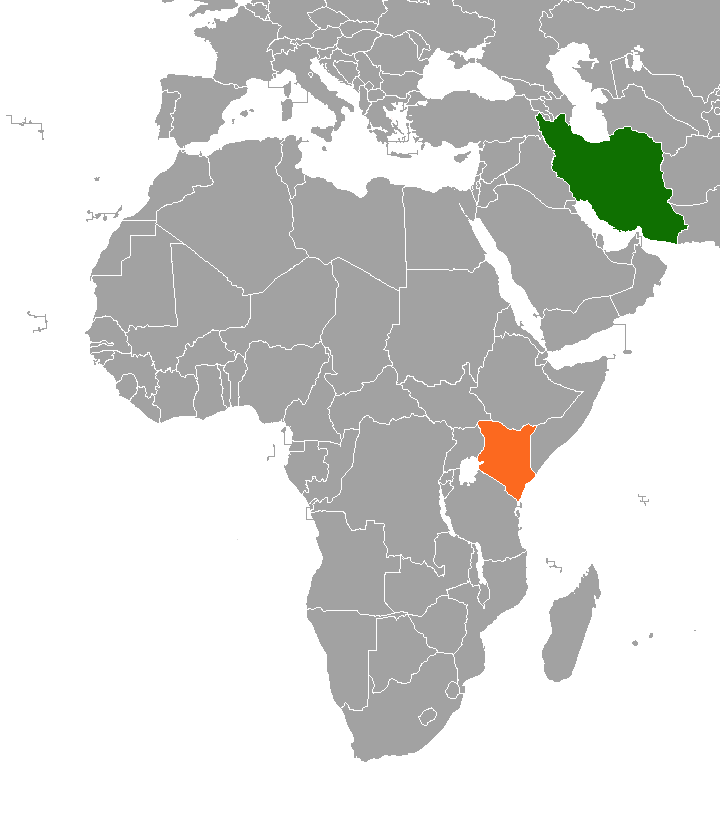

- Iran: Kenya

Iran–Kenya relations are bilateral relations between Iran and Kenya.

== History ==
=== Ahmadinejad's Visit ===
Kenya has in the past continued to have dealings with Iran, which have not always been viewed favourably by the West. Kenya has signed numerous deals with the Middle Eastern country including a deal to export 4m tonnes of oil to Kenya annually, direct flights between Tehran and Nairobi and scholarships for Kenyans to pursue higher education in Iran. This was all done in the visit by Iran's President, Mahmoud Ahmadinejad to Kenya in 2009.

In May 2012, Iran's Vice President, Mohammad Reza Rahimi visited Kenya to complete the deal for Kenya to buy Iranian oil.

In June 2012, the oil deal fell through as Kenya acted on warnings by Western countries of sanctions. Under the deal Iran would have supplied Kenya with 80,000 barrels of oil a day. However, with Kenya being a strategic ally of the US in the war on terror, the deal had shocked many in the international community. Kenya and Iran had a diplomatic row over the cancellation of the oil deal.

Kenya used to import oil from Iran in the 1970s and 1980s but hasn't imported any oil from the country since then.

It is generally thought that Iran's diplomacy in Africa will face difficulty especially because most Muslims on the continent adhere to the Sunni school rather than the Shiite school that is predominant in Iran. In 2012, Kenya arrested two members of the Revolutionary Guard who had planned to attack Israeli, British, US and even Saudi interests, within Kenya. They were sentenced to life in prison by a Kenyan court.

=== Views on Iran's nuclear program ===
Kenya's views on Iran's nuclear programme goes on the lines of the resolution made by the Non-Aligned Movement, which states that Iran has the right to develop nuclear energy resources but development of nuclear energy should be for peaceful means. The resolution was agreed upon in September 2006 by all 118 members of the Non-Aligned Movement.

=== Overall view of Iran ===
A study conducted by Pew Research Center on how favourable Kenyans viewed Iran found that about 42% of respondents viewed Iran favourably. The study involved 798 people and was conducted in March 2014. 34% of respondents said they viewed Iran unfavourably and 24% had no opinion.

== Development cooperation ==
In August 2014, Cabinet Secretary for Foreign Affairs of Kenya Amina Mohamed met with the Foreign Affairs Minister of Iran Mohammad Javad Zarif in Tehran. The two officials signed MOUs in economic, scientific and technical cooperation. The MOU also identified transport and infrastructure, energy, agriculture, water and irrigation, housing and health as other key areas of cooperation.

During his visit to African states in October 2018, Sorena Sattari, Iranian Vice-President for Science and Technology, underlined the necessity of creating a line of credit for banks and providing the opportunity for Iran and Kenya’s technology companies to interact with each other in order to exchange products and services.

During Iranian President Ebrahim Raisi's visit to Kenya in July 2023, the two countries signed five memorandums of understanding relating to information technology, fisheries, livestock products and investment promotion.

== Economic Relationship ==
Exports from Kenya to Iran in 2012 stood at KES. 1.95 billion (EUR. 18.3 million) while the value of imports from Iran to Kenya stood at KES. 3.67 billion (EUR. 34.5 million). Kenya's Foreign Cabinet Secretary stated that many powerful countries in the world still maintained trade relations with Iran and that both countries would keep trading.

Iran is one of the largest buyers of Kenyan tea. Kenya increased its tea exports to Iran from 2 million kilos to 10 million kilos over a five-year period. Demand for tea in Iran stands at 116 million kilos, with Iran only producing 20 million kilos. Kenya sells about 20% of its tea to Iran.

Iran's Innovation and Technology House is located in Nairobi. In this center, more than 35 Iranian knowledge-based companies will present their products in the fields of pharmaceuticals, medical equipment, agriculture (such as Pelican 2 drone with dual applications for "spraying" agricultural lands and also "farm inspection" with image processing capability), construction and architecture. Introduced and exported to Kenya.

In July 2023, the process of exporting 50 medical devices and 10 medicines made in Iran has started.

== Diplomatic missions ==
Iran maintains an embassy in Nairobi. Kenya also has an embassy in Tehran.

== See also ==
- Foreign relations of Iran
- Foreign relations of Kenya
