= Kenya–United Arab Emirates relations =

- Kenya: United Arab Emirates

Kenya–United Arab Emirates relations are the bilateral relations between Kenya and the United Arab Emirates.

== Historical relations ==
Relations between Kenya and the UAE have historical roots in the centuries old Indian Ocean trade networks that connected the Eastern Africa coast with the Arab peninsula. After Kenya gained independence in 1963, and the UAE establishment in 1971 formal diplomatic relations were established, deepening economic and political cooperation.

== Political relations ==
In 2011, President Mwai Kibaki made a state visit to the UAE and held talks with the President of the UAE and Ruler of Abu Dhabi, Khalifa bin Zayed Al Nahyan Prime Minister and Ruler of Dubai, Mohammed bin Rashid Al Maktoum he also met the Crown Prince of UAE Mohammed bin Zayed Al Nahyan.

In 2014, President Uhuru Kenyatta made a state visit to the UAE, he held talks with Prime Minister and Ruler of Dubai, Mohammed bin Rashid Al Maktoum. They held talks about counter terrorism and youth radicalisation. They also witnessed the signing of a trade agreement. The Promotion and Protection of Investments will see more FDI from the UAE and will ease Kenyan companies wanting to do business in the UAE.

The Kenyan President also met the Interior Minister and Deputy Prime Minister of UAE, His Highness Sheikh Saif Bin Zayed. He also held talks with the UAE Minister of Foreign Affairs, Sheikh Abdalla Bin Zayed.

Tensions emerged in 2025 regarding Kenya's perceived support for Sudan's Rapid Support Forces, a paramilitary group involved in Sudan's civil conflict. The UAE, suspected of backing the RSF, denies involvement, but Kenya's engagement with RSF leaders in Nairobi has led to criticism from Sudan and other international actors.

== Economic relations ==
In 2013, Kenyan imports from the UAE stood at KES. 143 billion (EUR. 1.348 billion). Made up mostly of oil and petroleum products. Kenyan exports to the UAE stood at KES. 30 billion (EUR. 286 million).

Total trade between both countries stood at KES. 173 billion (EUR. 1.634 billion). This made the UAE Kenya's 4th largest trading partner and the largest trading partner and export destination in the Middle East.

The UAE was Kenya's 5th largest export destination and the 4th largest import source.

In January 2024, both nations signed a significant economic agreement to double UAE investments in Kenya, with Nairobi set to receive a $1.5 billion loan from the UAE to address fiscal deficits.

A major milestone came in January 2025, when Kenyan President William Ruto and UAE President Sheikh Mohamed bin Zayed Al Nahyan oversaw the signing of the Comprehensive Economic Partnership Agreement. The agreement aims to reduce trade barriers, improve market access and encourage investment in sectors including agriculture, manufacturing, logistics, energy and technology. Kenya's government has described it as the UAE's first such agreement with a mainland African country.

== Diaspora ==
As of 2010, approximately 36,000 Kenyans work in the UAE.

As of 2026, approximately 50,000 - 80,000 Kenyans work and live in the UAE.

== Military relations ==
Kenya and the UAE collaborate on defense and regional security based following bilateral agreements, official military exchange and dialogue on shared security issues. Kenya's hosting of rebel groups from Sudan and the Democratic Republic of the Congo have strained its reputation as a neutral mediator in regional conflicts. The UAE's alleged connections to RSF have further complicated the diplomatic landscape.

== Diplomatic missions ==
Kenya maintains an embassy in Abu Dhabi and a consulate in Dubai.

In August 2014, the UAE announced that it would upgrade its Nairobi mission to the largest in Africa. The mission would actively participate in linking Kenyans with job opportunities in the UAE.

In January 2025, the two countries signed a Comprehensive Economic Partnership Agreement

== See also ==
- Foreign relations of Kenya
- Foreign relations of the United Arab Emirates
