= Algeria–Kenya relations =

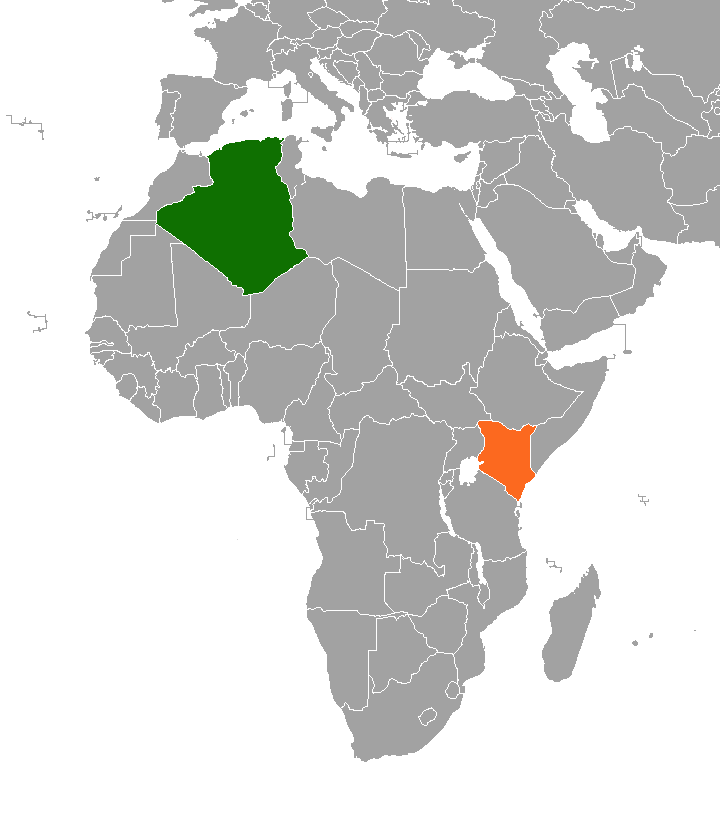
- Algeria: Kenya

Algeria–Kenya relations are bilateral relations between Algeria and Kenya. Algeria maintains an embassy in Nairobi. Kenya also maintains an embassy in Algiers.

== History ==
In December 2013, during his five-day visit to Algiers, Speaker of the National Assembly of Kenya Justin Muturi met with Algerian Prime Minister Abdelmalek Sellal. During the talks, the countries agreed to create a joint Algerian-Kenyan commission aimed at boosting ties between both countries.

In February 2015, President Uhuru Kenyatta made a 3-day state visit to Algeria on the invitation of President Abdelaziz Bouteflika. During his visit Kenyatta opened Kenya's Embassy in Algeria.

== Development cooperation ==
Algeria and Kenya agreed to develop economic, technological and political areas as well as ways and means to strengthen ties and develop both countries. Both nations have signed two pacts of cooperation and political consultation.

In a meeting with the Algerian Minister of Energy Addelhamid Senouci Bereksi, it was agreed that Algeria will train Kenyans on oil and gas production while Kenya will open its doors to Algerians to train on Geothermal and renewable power.

In another meeting with the Prime Minister of Algeria, Abdelmalek Sellal, the leaders pledged to continue working together to stem terrorism through sharing of vital information.

== Trade ==
In 2013, Kenya exported goods worth KES. 545 million (EUR. 5.3 million) compared to imports of KES. 13 million (EUR. 126,000).

== See also ==
- Foreign relations of Algeria
- Foreign relations of Kenya
