= Kenya–Netherlands relations =

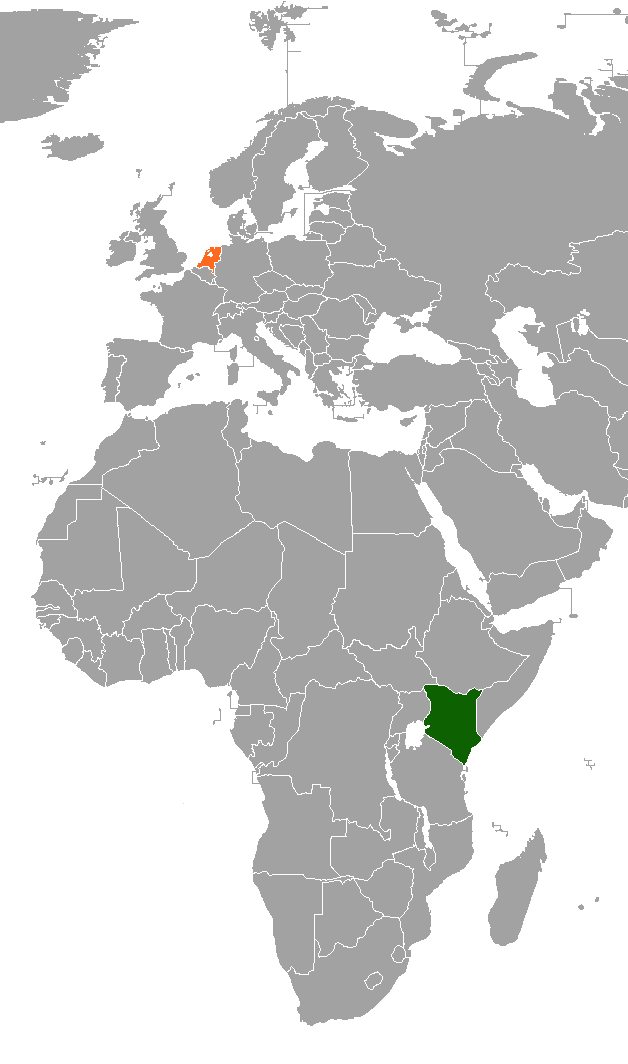
- Kenya: Netherlands

Kenya–Netherlands relations are bilateral relations between Kenya and the Netherlands.

== History ==
The first Afrikaner settlers, who are of Dutch descent, began arriving in Kenya in 1906, they settled around Kenya's Uasin Gishu County and the immediate surrounding areas. Bilateral ties are estimated to go back to the 1970s. Relations between both countries are generally good. However, the ICC process has dampened Kenya's relations with Western nations. The Dutch government predicts that beyond 2020 relations between both countries will improve in a mutually beneficial economic partnership.

== Development cooperation ==
By 2021 the Dutch government hopes to replace donor programmes in Kenya with investment programmes, this will enable private entities from the Netherlands to participate in investment and aid programmes.

The Dutch government unlike most European countries is cutting its aid to Kenya which was at KES. 2.7 billion (EUR. 25.4 million) in 2014. It is estimated that this will drop to KES. 1.6 billion (EUR. 14.7 million) in 2017.

Key areas for Kenya and Dutch cooperation are:

- Agriculture (focusing on food security and drought resilience)
- Water and environment
- Support for the health sector
- Security and rule of law
- Gender Equality
- Private sector development and Economic diplomacy

A significant number of Kenyans study in the Netherlands.

The Royal Dutch Navy has helped in counter-piracy operations within the Indian Ocean. It's generally perceived that Kenya won't seek deeper military ties with the Netherlands.

== Economic relations ==
In 2011 trade between Kenya and the Netherlands was worth KES. 91 billion (EUR. 852 million).

The Netherlands is the fifth largest export destination for Kenyan goods worldwide. It is the second in Europe.

Kenya's main exports to the Netherlands include: live animals, coffee, tea, fruits, vegetables, fish and tobacco.

The Netherlands's main exports to Kenya include: automatic data processing machines, clothing & accessories, household items, linen & furnishings, chemicals, machinery, transport equipment, dairy products, plastics and electronics.

Multinational corporations such as Phillips, Unilever, Shell, KLM, Boskalis and Heineken have operations in Kenya. Over 100 other Dutch companies most of which have business in Kenya's flower industry, have set up shop in the country. In recent years Dutch companies have also been involved in other sectors such as renewable energy, water and sanitation, infrastructure, logistics, ICT and finance.

== Aviation ==
Air France-KLM owns a 26% stake in Kenya Airways, Africa's fourth largest airline. Kenya Airways operates direct flights to Amsterdam, KLM also operates direct flights to Nairobi.

== Diplomatic missions ==
Kenya has an embassy in The Hague. The Netherlands has an embassy in Nairobi.

== See also ==
- Foreign relations of Kenya
- Foreign relations of the Netherlands
