= Greece–Kenya relations =

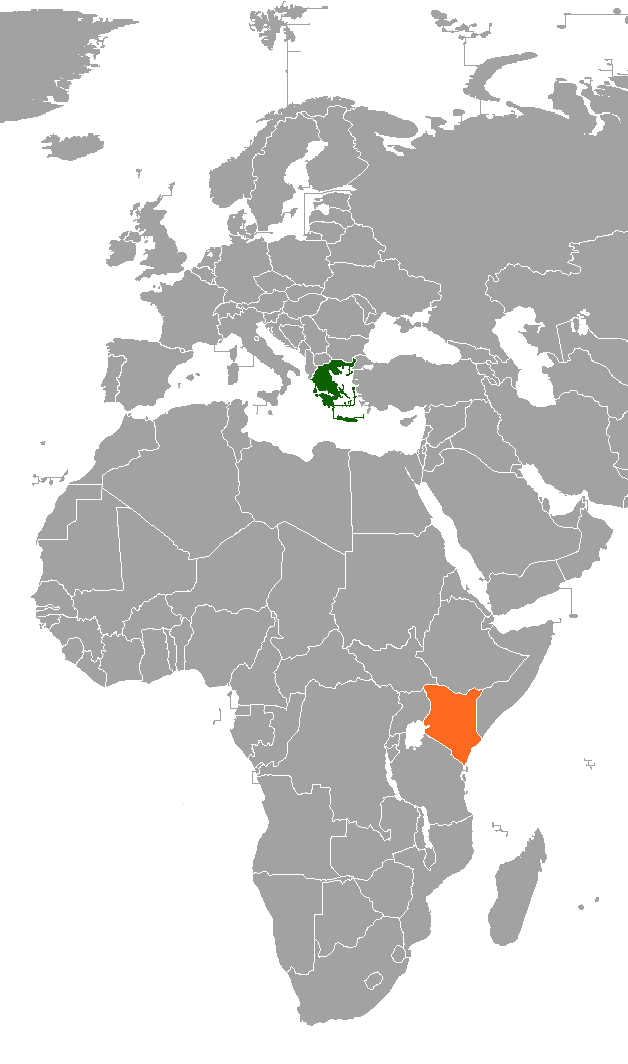
- Greece: Kenya

Greece–Kenya relations are the bilateral relations between Greece and Kenya. Greece has an embassy in Nairobi and an Honorary Consulate in Mombasa. Kenya is represented in Greece through its embassy in Rome, Italy.

== Agreements ==
Greece and Kenya have the following bilateral agreements: The present framework of treaties consists of the following agreements:

- Negotiation Protocol between the Foreign Ministries (Nairobi 16.11.1998)
- Economic and Technological Cooperation Agreement (16.11.1998)
- Agreement on Legal Aid for Civil and Commercial Affairs (jointly with England, London, 27.2.1936). Law 730/1937. (Government Gazette. 227 /1937). (Through a joint Agreement between Greece and Kenya, dated 16.10.1967 the agreement in force is extended pending a new agreement)
- Extradition Agreement (jointly with England). (Athens, 11/24.9.1910). Government Gazette. 41 /1912 (through a Joint Agreement dated 16.10.1967 between Greece and Kenya extended pending a new agreement).

A Tourist Agreement between Greece and Kenya agreed upon in 2003 is also pending signature.

== Political and economic relations ==
In November 1998, the Greek Foreign Minister Theodoros Pangalos visited Kenya.

In the 1999 Ocalan affair, the Greek consul in Kenya, George Costoulas, harbored PKK leader Abdullah Öcalan. Ocalan moved from Syria to Italy to Russia to Greece and finally the Greek Embassy in Nairobi, Kenya, on February 2, 1999. Turkish commandos captured Ocalan with the aid of Kenyan security forces. Following the arrest the Kenya government shuffled its Cabinet over the public outcry over its "murky role" in the affair. Kenyan Finance Minister Simeon Nyachae resigned rather than accept a demotion to head the Ministry of Industrial Development. Frank Kwinga, who headed the Immigration portfolio, and Duncan Wachira, who was the Police Commissioner, were both dismissed from their positions. Noah Katanangala, the Minister of Land Settlement, was also moved to another post in the government. Three Greek officials were removed from office over the affair.

In the first half of 2003, Greece held the Presidency of the European Union and was subsequently elected as a non-permanent member of the UN Security Council. This created a favourable framework for promoting Greece's relations with Africa, especially Kenya, which plays an active role in Central Africa, as seen in her intervention within the framework of IGAD, on the issue of Southern Sudan.

The Athens Chamber of Trade and Industry undertook an exploratory visit in 2001 to identify areas for promoting trade relations with Kenya, especially in the foodstuffs, pharmaceuticals and cosmetics sectors. It is expected that the negotiations between the European Union and the ACP countries to establish a new trade regime by the end of 2007 will contribute substantially to the further development of trade with Kenya. The flow of Greek tourists to Kenya has increased over the last few years, especially in the form of package holidays.

== Resident diplomatic missions ==
- Greece has an embassy in Nairobi.
- Kenya is accredited to Greece from its embassy in Rome, Italy.

== See also ==
- Foreign relations of Greece
- Foreign relations of Kenya
