= Colombia–Kenya relations =

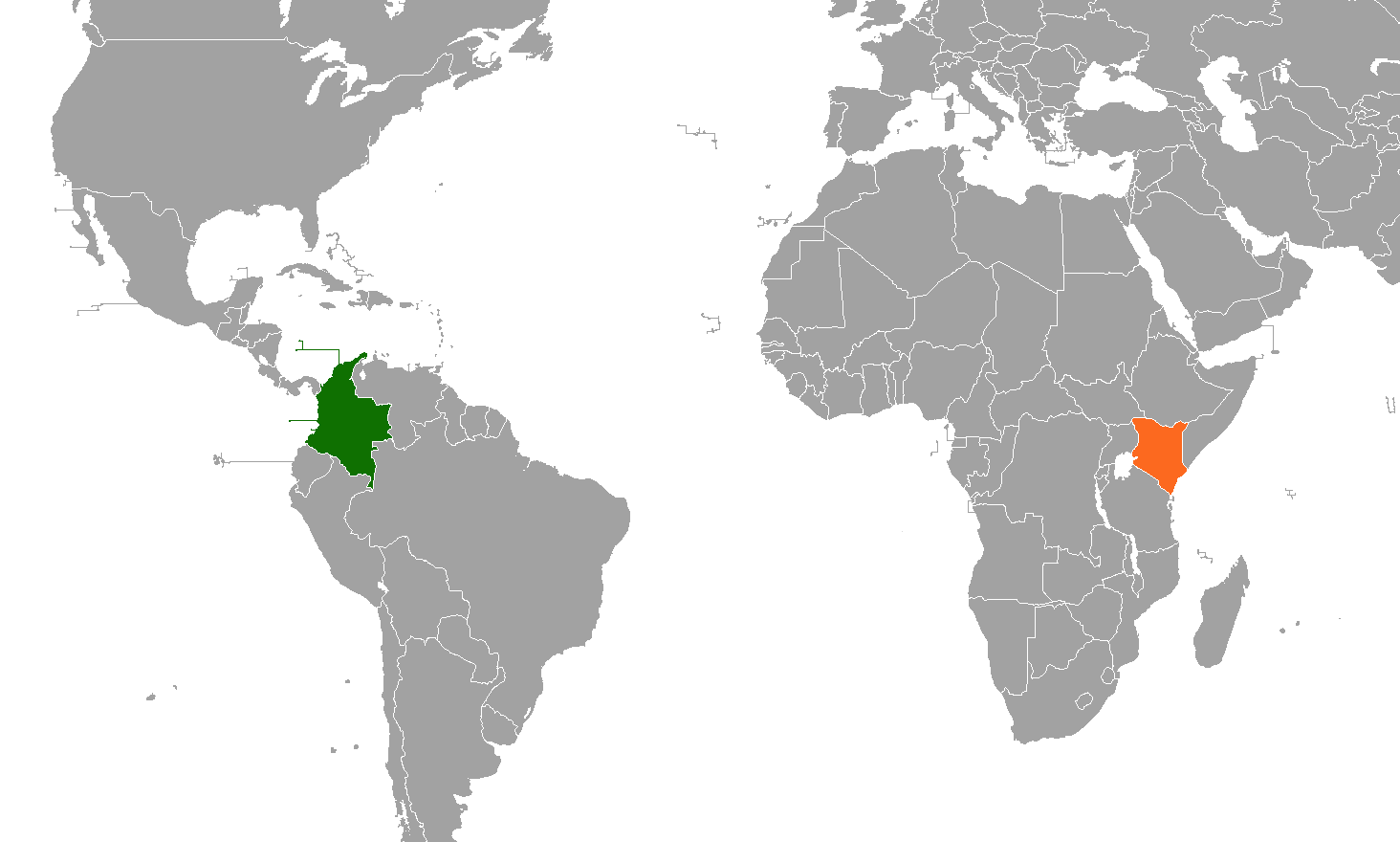
- Colombia: Kenya

Colombia–Kenya relations are the bilateral relations between Colombia and Kenya. Both nations are members of the G77 and the Non-Aligned Movement.

== History ==
Colombia and Kenya first established diplomatic relations on January 27, 1975. On December 2, 2020, the ambassador of Colombia to Kenya, Mónica de Greiff Lindo, presented her credentials to the Kenyan president Uhuru Kenyatta. In 2023, Colombian vice president Francia Márquez made an official visit to Kenya to enhance ties and promote collaboration between the two countries.

== High-level visits ==
High-level visits from Colombia to Kenya

- Vice President Francisco Santos Calderón (2008)
- Director of Asia, Africa, and Oceania Alfredo Ramos (2017)
- Vice President Francia Márquez (2023)

High-level visits from Kenya to Colombia

- Deputy President Rigathi Gachagua (2023)

== Bilateral agreements ==
Both nations have signed bilateral agreements such as a Trade agreement between the Government of the Republic of Colombia and the Government of Kenya (1977); Memorandum of Understanding between Diplomatic Academies (2021); Memorandum of Understanding on Political Consultations (2021); Memorandum of Understanding between the Ministry of National Education of Colombia and the Ministry of Education of Kenya (2023) and a First Joint Commission for Cooperation (2023).

== Trade ==
In 2022, Colombia exported $846k to Kenya. The products exported from Colombia to Kenya included Tanned Equine and Bovine Hides ($129k), Coffee ($128k), and other live plants, cuttings as well as slips; mushroom spawn ($123k). Kenya exported $1.23M to Colombia. The products exported from Kenya to Colombia consisted of Coffee and Tea Extracts ($447k), Knit Men's Undergarments ($225k), and Non-Knit Men's Suits ($195k).

== Diplomatic missions ==
- Colombia has an embassy in Nairobi.
- Kenya is accredited to Colombia from its embassy in Brasília, Brazil.

== See also ==
- Foreign relations of Colombia
- Foreign relations of Kenya
