= Burundi–Kenya relations =

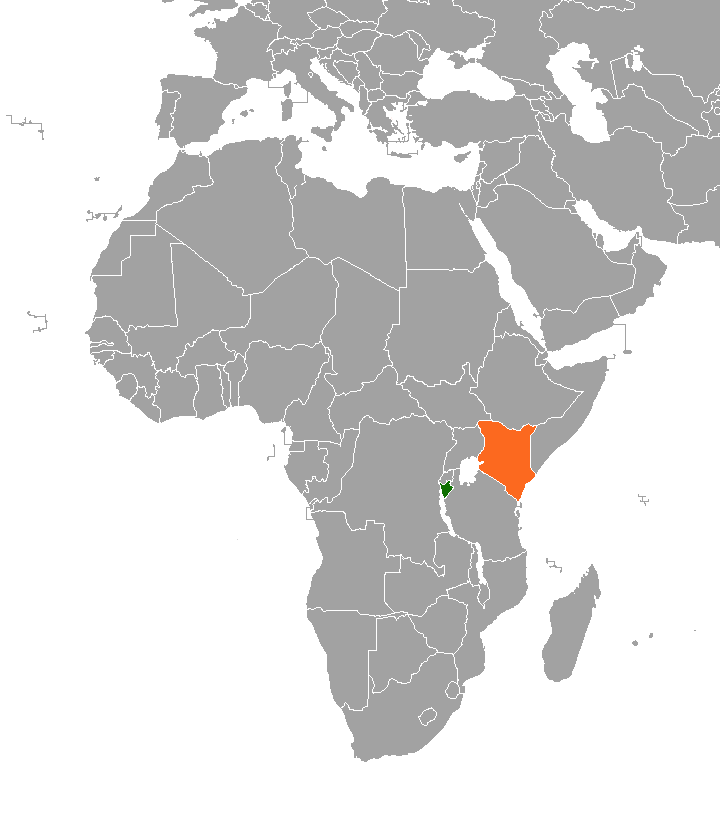

- Burundi: Kenya

Burundi–Kenya relations are bilateral relations between Burundi and Kenya. Burundi is a partner of Kenya in many areas, particularly trade, security (military), education, agriculture and energy. In 2011, both countries signed a comprehensive bilateral agreement to promote development and technology transfer in agriculture, livestock and fisheries development between them.

== Overview ==
During the Burundian ethnic clashes, a significant number of Burundians took up refuge in Kenya. Burundi, along with Kenya, is one of the Swahili-speaking states in the African Great Lakes region.

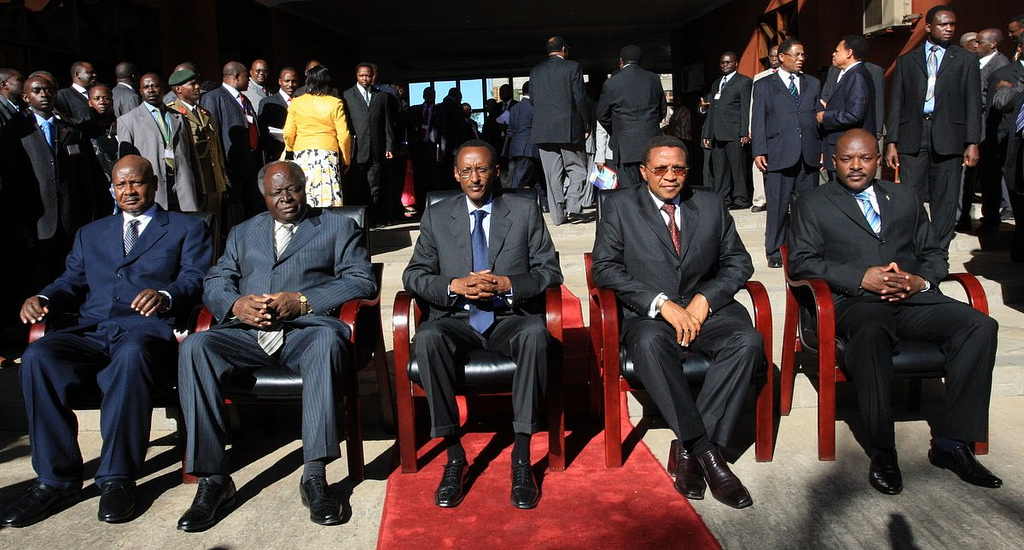
President Mwai Kibaki (Kenya) with, from left to right, Presidents Yoweri Museveni (Uganda), Paul Kagame (Rwanda), Jakaya Kikwete of (Tanzania), and Pierre Nkurunziza (Burundi) at an East African Community Head of States Meeting

In September 2007, Kenya opened a resident mission in Bujumbura.

The Presidents of Burundi and Kenya have on multiple occasions made state visits to each other's country.

On 1 July 2007, Burundi became a full member of the East African Community (EAC).

Additionally, Burundi joined the EAC Customs Union on 6 July 2009. It has since then has been a strategic partner in terms of customs and trade integration.

In 2024, in response to a planned crackdown on unlicensed migrant businesses by Kenyan President William Ruto, hundreds of Burundians in Kenya sought travel documents to return home.

== Development cooperation ==
Kenyan firms have operations in Burundi. Some of which are Kenya Airways, Kenya Commercial Bank (Burundi) and Diamond Trust Bank.

Under current and previous programmes the Kenyan government has on multiple occasions helped build the capacity of Burundi government officials in major state and transport organs. These include:

- Students have undergone training in Kenya at the expense of Kenya Port Authority.
- OBR staffs had been trained by the Kenya Revenue Authority.
- Burundi Defence Force have undergone training at the Kenya Military Institute.
- Staffs of Ministry of Foreign Affairs and International Cooperation (Burundi) have been trained in Kenya at the Institute of Diplomacy.

Both countries have also signed the following BTAs and MoUs:

- Agreement on Promotion and Protection of Investments signed in February 2009
- Agreement on Bilateral Air services (BASA)
- MoU on Defence matters
- MoU on Cooperation in Agriculture, Livestock, and Fisheries done in November 2011
- MoU on High Education, Science and Technology
- MoU to modernise the Port of Bujumbura by the Mombasa Port

Additionally, EAC countries are working on building a standard gauge railway link that would go through Mombasa-Nairobi-Kampala-Kigali. The line could be extended to Bujumbura in the future. Works began on the Kenyan section of the rail line in December 2014.

== Diplomatic missions ==
- Burundi has an embassy in Nairobi.
- Kenya has an embassy in Bujumbura.

== See also ==
- African Free Trade Zone
