= Kenya–Qatar relations =

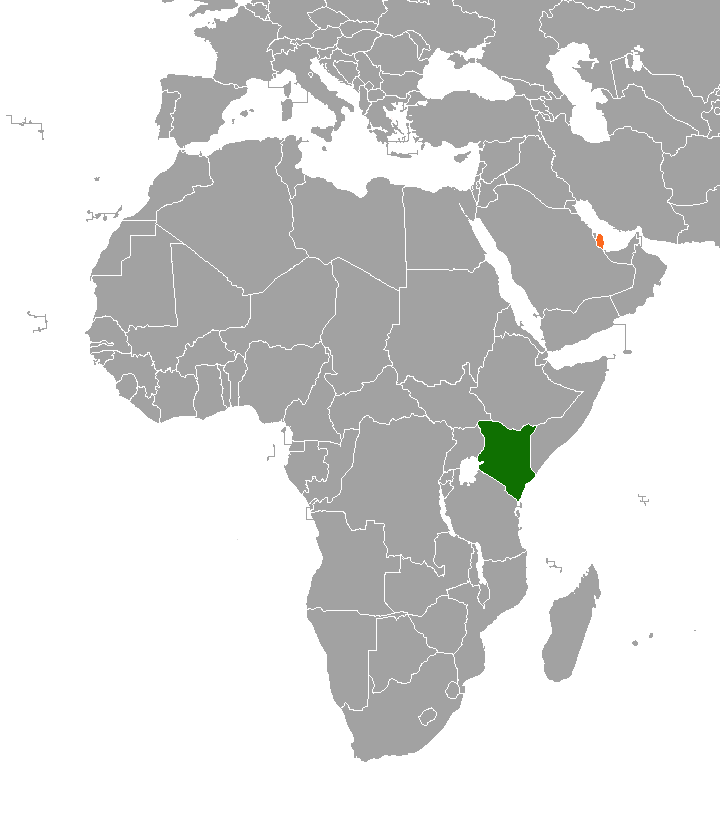

- Kenya: Qatar

Kenya–Qatar relations are bilateral relations between Kenya and Qatar. Diplomatic relations between the two countries were first established in 2003.

== History ==
In April 2014, Kenya's President Uhuru Kenyatta made a state visit to Qatar. He met with the Emir of Qatar, Tamim bin Hamad Al Thani. They held talks on regional stabilization, security and youth radicalization. They both witnessed the signing of multiple agreements and deals. Kenyatta also met with Qatar's minister of energy. At the end of the state visit, Qatar became the first Persian Gulf country to establish a double tax agreement with Kenya.

On Kenya's independence day the Emir congratulated the Kenyan President during Kenya's Independence Day.

== Development cooperation ==
Both countries have signed cooperation agreements in trade, industry, energy, communications, transport, construction, labour, tourism and agriculture. Qatar will train Kenyan port officials and employ more people in the transport and aviation sectors.

There are direct shipping routes from Mombasa to Doha and direct flights from Nairobi to Doha. Qatar Airways has shown interest in starting direct Mombasa (Kenya's second largest city) to Doha flights.

In 2008, Kenya and Qatar signed a deal that would allow Qatar to lease 100,000 hectares of Kenyan land. The deal would pave the way for the Qatari government to fund a significant portion of the LAPSSET projects. Qatar intended on using the land to grow food, as less than 1% of the Gulf country is arable.

The lease deal never went through and Kenya sought to source financing of the LAPSSET projects from multiple financiers which could also include Qatar.

In 2014, a section of the Qatari Businessmen Association visited Nairobi as a trade delegation from Qatar to Kenya.

== Trade ==
In 2011, Kenya exported goods worth KES. 53 million (US$580,000) to Qatar. Qatar exported goods worth KES. 1.01 billion (US$11 million).

Kenya's main exports to Qatar include: unprocessed agricultural foods.

Qatar's main exports to Kenya include: chemicals, fertilisers, plastics and furniture.

== Diplomatic missions ==
- Qatar maintains an embassy in Nairobi which was opened in 2012.
- Kenya has an embassy in Doha opened in 2010.
