= Kenya–Norway relations =

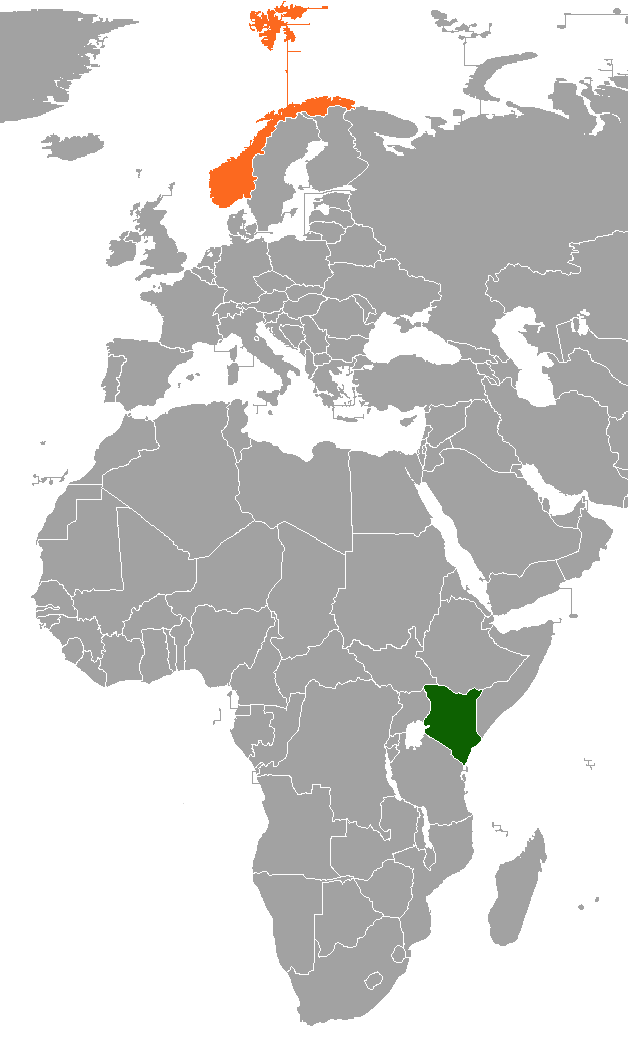
- Kenya: Norway

Kenya–Norway relations are bilateral relations between Kenya and Norway.

== History ==
Presently, relations between both countries are cordial.

Diplomatic relations between both countries were established shortly after Kenya's independence from the United Kingdom in 1963. Officially diplomatic relations began between the two countries in February of 1964.

Norway was the second European country to recognize Kenyan independence, behind Russia

In 1990, diplomatic relations between Kenya and Norway were severed due to Norway's criticism of the Kenyan government and its leadership. Ties were restored in 1994 by the Norwegian ambassador appointed in 1997.

Norway's Trade Minister, Monica Mæland, led a delegation of 54 companies to Kenya in September 2015.

Foreign Minister Børge Brende visited Nairobi for the 10th Ministerial Conference of the World Trade Organization held at the Kenyatta International Convention Centre in December 2015.

== Development cooperation ==
Norway is cooperating with Kenya with a shift from aid to trade and investment.

Key areas for Kenya and Norwegian cooperation are:

- Human rights
- Governance

== Economic relations ==
Total trade is approximately KES. 8.1 billion (EUR. 72.4 million).

In 2014 Kenya exported goods worth KES. 5.8 billion (EUR. 51.8 million) to Norway. In addition, Norway exported goods worth KES. 2.3 billion (EUR. 20.5 million).

Kenya's main exports to Norway include: plants, flowers, coffee, tea and spices.

60% of Norway's exports to Kenya are made up of chemical fertiliser.

The Norwegian Sovereign Wealth Fund invested in Kenya in 2012, as of 2015 total investment is worth KES. 8.2 billion (EUR. 73.25 million). Norfund, which is an investment fund for small and medium-sized companies in emerging countries, established its Nairobi office in 2007. The Norwegian office for trade, Innovation Norway, also opened its Nairobi office in 2014.

== Diplomatic missions ==
Kenya's embassy in Stockholm is accredited to Norway. Norway has an embassy in Nairobi.
