= Kenya–Pakistan relations =

- Pakistan: Kenya

Kenya–Pakistan relations are the bilateral relations between Pakistan and Kenya. Both countries are members of the Commonwealth of Nations, Non-Aligned Movement and Group of 77.

== History ==
Relations between Pakistan and Kenya were first historically established in the 1960s, when Pakistan expressed its support for Kenya getting independence from British rule.

== 2004 Joint Ministerial Commission ==
In 2004, the Pakistan-Kenya Joint Ministerial Commission session was hosted in Nairobi, to boost bilateral trade and economic relations.

In the forum, the Foreign Minister of Kenya had stated that "Kenya values its friendship with Pakistan" and that "Kenya expresses the desire for further deepening of economic and commercial ties between the two countries." The High Commissioner of Kenya, Mishi Mwatsahu, also appealed to Pakistani businessmen that "they should consider Kenya an attractive country to tap for investment, as Kenya is a gateway for Pakistani investors to enter the big market of 38 African states, which are landlocked to Kenya that has an international seaport of Mombasa." She also further said that "Kenya would fully support Pakistani investors in exploring the potential areas of investment in Kenya. She said Kenya had established a one-window’ facility for foreign investors to facilitate them and make business processes easier for them.

In response, the Commerce Minister of Pakistan welcomed Kenya's aims to strengthen its ties with Pakistan and stressed the need for exchange of information, business delegations and regular participation in each other's trade fairs. He also pointed out that both the countries should lower down the tariff and non-tariff barriers to expand bilateral trade. In this respect, he hoped that both the countries would be able to make progress in their negotiations on a preferential tariff agreement (PTA).

== Diaspora ==
While Kenyan census data do not distinguish between Pakistanis and other South Asians, the 2009 Kenyan census recorded 46,782 Kenyan citizens of South Asian origin, as well as 35,009 non-citizens of South Asian origin.

== Development cooperation ==
Pakistan offers various courses and training programmes to Kenya in Junior level diplomatic courses, Advance diplomatic course for mid career level diplomats, Advance Railway Courses, International Central Banking Course, International Commercial Banking Course and Postal Service Training.

Pakistan has in the past provided relief assistance to Kenya in 2006 and 2011. Kenya also provided assistance to Pakistan during the 2010 floods.

== Trade ==
In 2012, Kenya exported goods worth KES. 256 billion (US$2.8 billion) to Pakistan.

Main exports to Pakistan from Kenya are: coffee, tea, industrial supplies, fuel and transport equipment. Food and beverages make up 45% of the total export values to Pakistan.

Main exports to Kenya from Pakistan are rice.

Pakistan is the second largest export partner destination for Kenyan goods after the UAE in Asia. However, in 2012, Pakistan was the leading export destination for Kenyan goods in Asia.

== Diplomatic missions ==
Kenya maintains a high commission in Islamabad and Pakistan a high commission in Nairobi.
