= Kenya–Spain relations =

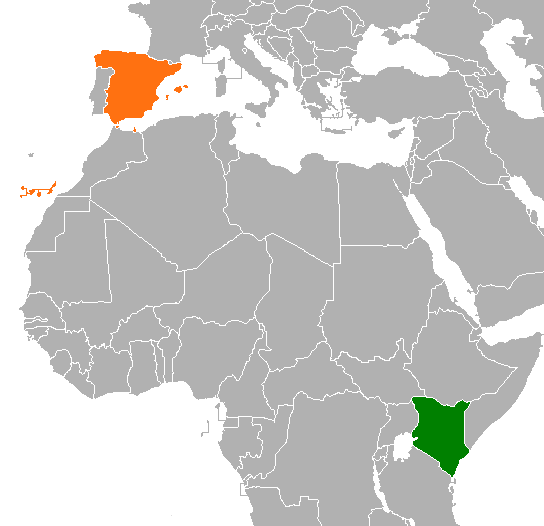
- Kenya: Spain

Kenya–Spain relations are the bilateral and diplomatic relations between these two countries. Kenya has an embassy in Madrid. Spain has an embassy in Nairobi and an honorary consulate in Mombasa.

== Diplomatic relations ==
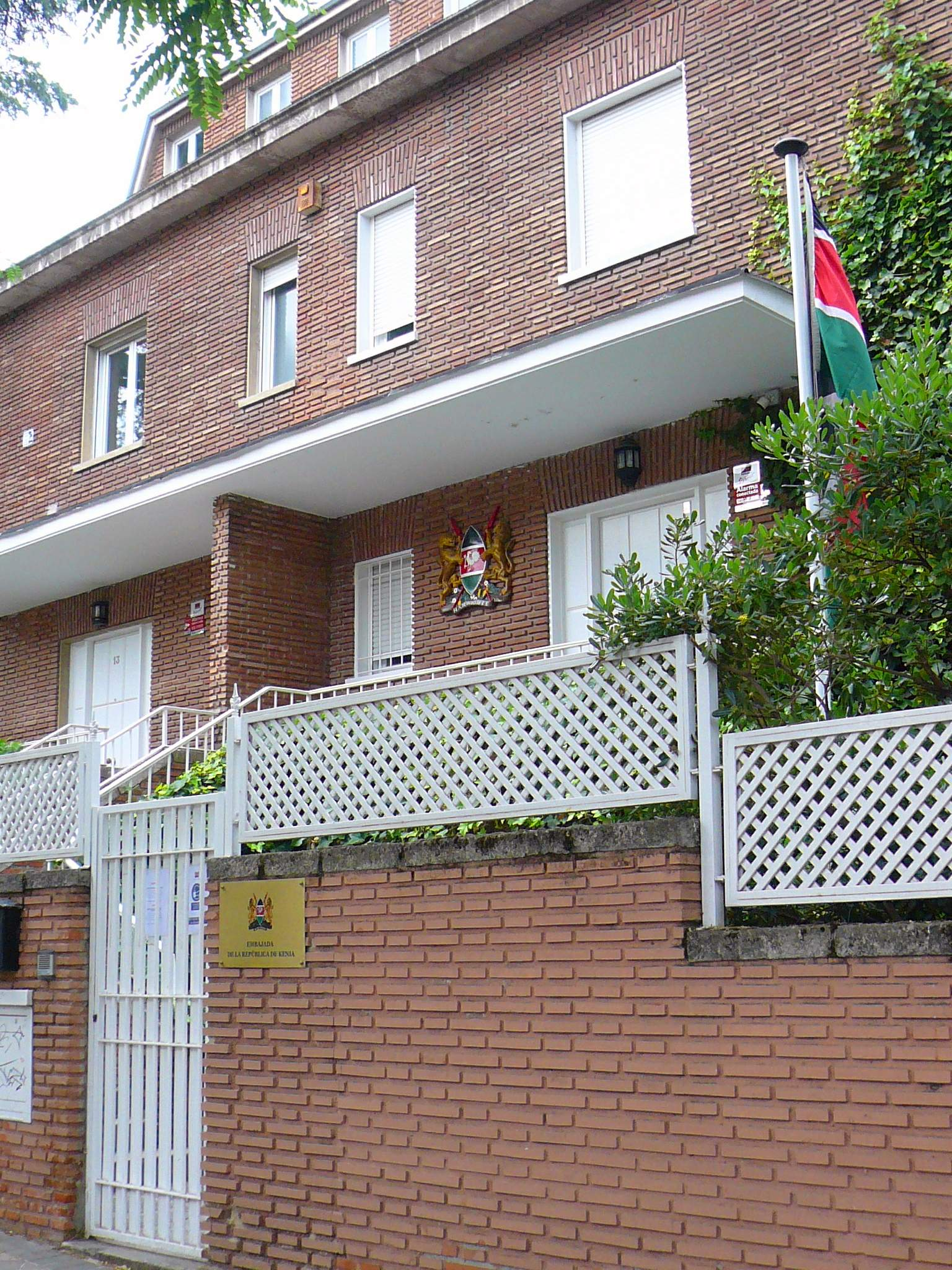
Embassy of Kenya in Madrid

Spain and Kenya established diplomatic relations in 1965, with the opening of the Spanish Embassy in Nairobi from 1967. Kenya opened the Embassy in Spain on 2005, the date on which a Commercial Office was also opened from Spain in Nairobi.

== Economic relations ==
The bilateral trade relations of Spain with the East African Community (to which Uganda, Kenya, Tanzania, Rwanda and Burundi belong) are not very significant. Spanish exports to the three main countries of the region, Kenya, Tanzania and Uganda, reached 124.3 M EUR in 2014 and imports to Spain from these three countries stood at 79.5 M EUR. Until November 2015, the total exported by Spain to the three countries stood at 132 M EUR, while the value of imports reached 90 M EUR.

Until November 2015, Spanish exports to Kenya amounted to 89 M EUR, which represents an increase over 2014 of 9%. The main chapters exported in 2014 (latest available data) were: Machinery (16.8%); Electrical equipment and devices (16.8%); Fish (10.2%); Chemical products (5.7%); other chemical products (5.6%); iron / steel foundry manufacturing (4.9%).

Lto import until November 2015 it was 36 M EUR, with an increase of 24% compared to 2014. The main chapters imported in 2014 (latest available data) were: Canned vegetables or fruit (38%); Canned meat or fish and seafood (20.1%); Minerals, slags and ashes (6.6%); Fruits (6%); Coffee, tea, maté and spices (5.5%); Hides and leathers (5.5%); other vegetable textile fibers (4.6%).

The bilateral trade balance maintains the trade surplus in 2015 in favor of Spain at values similar to those of 2014, that is, around €53 million. On 9 June 2009, the first Bilateral Financial Program with Kenya worth 150 M EUR was signed in Nairobi.

== Cooperation ==
Kenya is not included in the Cooperation Master Plan. Decentralized cooperation and NGDOs are the main actors. Currently, several Spanish NGDOs work in Kenya, including ANIDAN, the HIVDA Association, Más Por them and the Pablo Horstmann Foundation. Finally, Spain is an important contributor to both the United Nations Environment Program (UNEP) and the Program of the United Nations for Human Settlements (UN-HABITAT), both based in Nairobi.

== See also ==
- List of ambassadors of Spain to Kenya
