= Kenya–Zimbabwe relations =

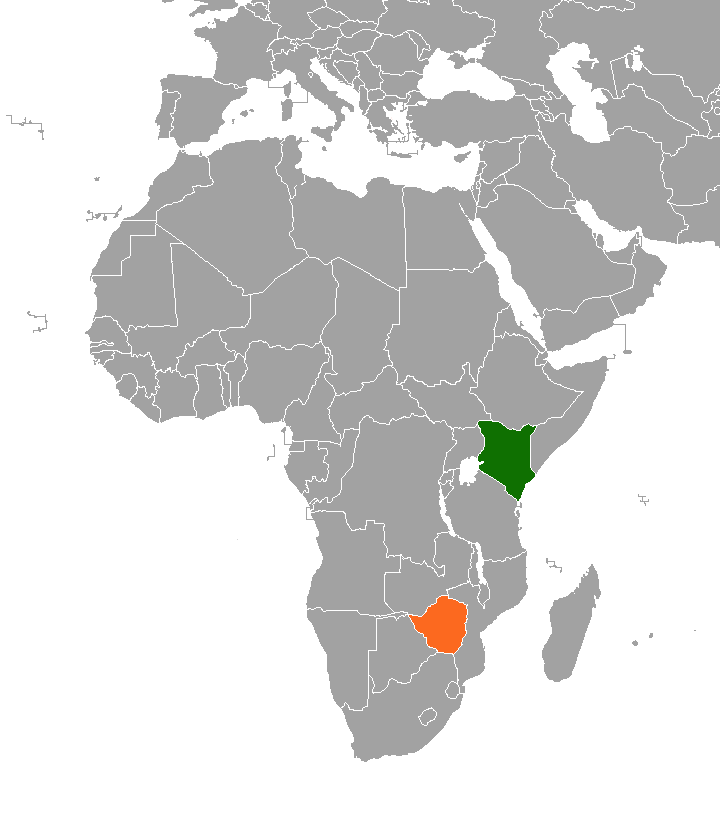

- Kenya: Zimbabwe

Kenya–Zimbabwe relations are bilateral relations between Kenya and Zimbabwe. Both nations are members of the African Union and the United Nations, and are located in East Africa.

Both Kenya and Zimbabwe were part of the British Empire until their independence in 1963 and 1980 respectively.

== History ==
Kenya and Zimbabwe enjoy cordial relations. In 2014, it was announced that both countries were to sign MOUs. The agreement aimed to strengthen relations and promote tourism between both countries. Zimbabwean tourism minister mentioned that, both countries had a lot to learn from each other. He highlighted Kenya's successful efforts to boost domestic tourism as international numbers fell.

In the same year, a fake Twitter account in the name of President Robert Mugabe’s ZANU-PF party urged tourists to ditch Kenya for Zimbabwe. The ZANU PF party and Zimbabwean government issued a statement over the matter. In 2021, Kenya granted citizenship to members of the Shona people from Zimbabwe, who had been stateless since migrating to Kenya as missionaries as early as the 1930s, until 1959, predating Kenya's independence in 1963.

== Trade ==
The Kenya Association of Manufacturers had a trade mission in Zimbabwe in November 2011. Trade between both COMESA countries was said to be insignificant, but rising.

== Resident Diplomatic missions ==
- Kenya has an embassy in Harare.
- Zimbabwe has an embassy in Nairobi.
