= Kenya–Namibia relations =

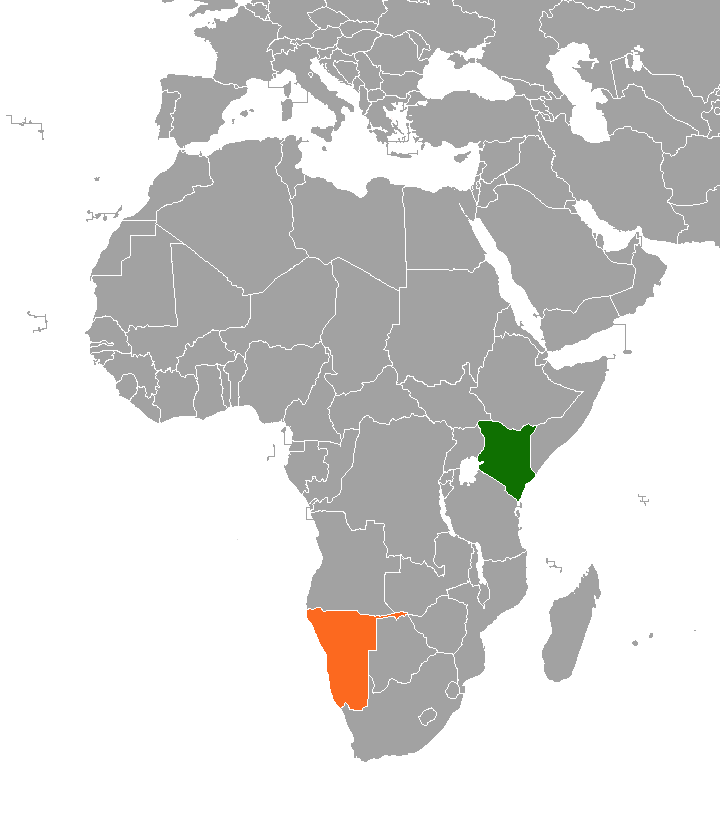
- Kenya: Namibia

Kenya–Namibia relations are bilateral relations between Namibia and Kenya.

== History ==
Kenya's relationship with Namibia goes back to Namibia's struggle for independence from South Africa. SWAPO was then a struggling liberation movement. In 1964, Kenya donated a Land Rover to SWAPO to ease their transportation needs within some Southern Africa states. Kenya also assisted with the transition in Namibia that occurred between 1989 and 1990 through the United Nations Transition Assistance Group (UNTAG).

== State visits ==
In late 2018 President Hage Geingob visited Nairobi and held talks with President Kenyatta. President Kenyatta reciprocated in early 2019.

== Cooperation ==
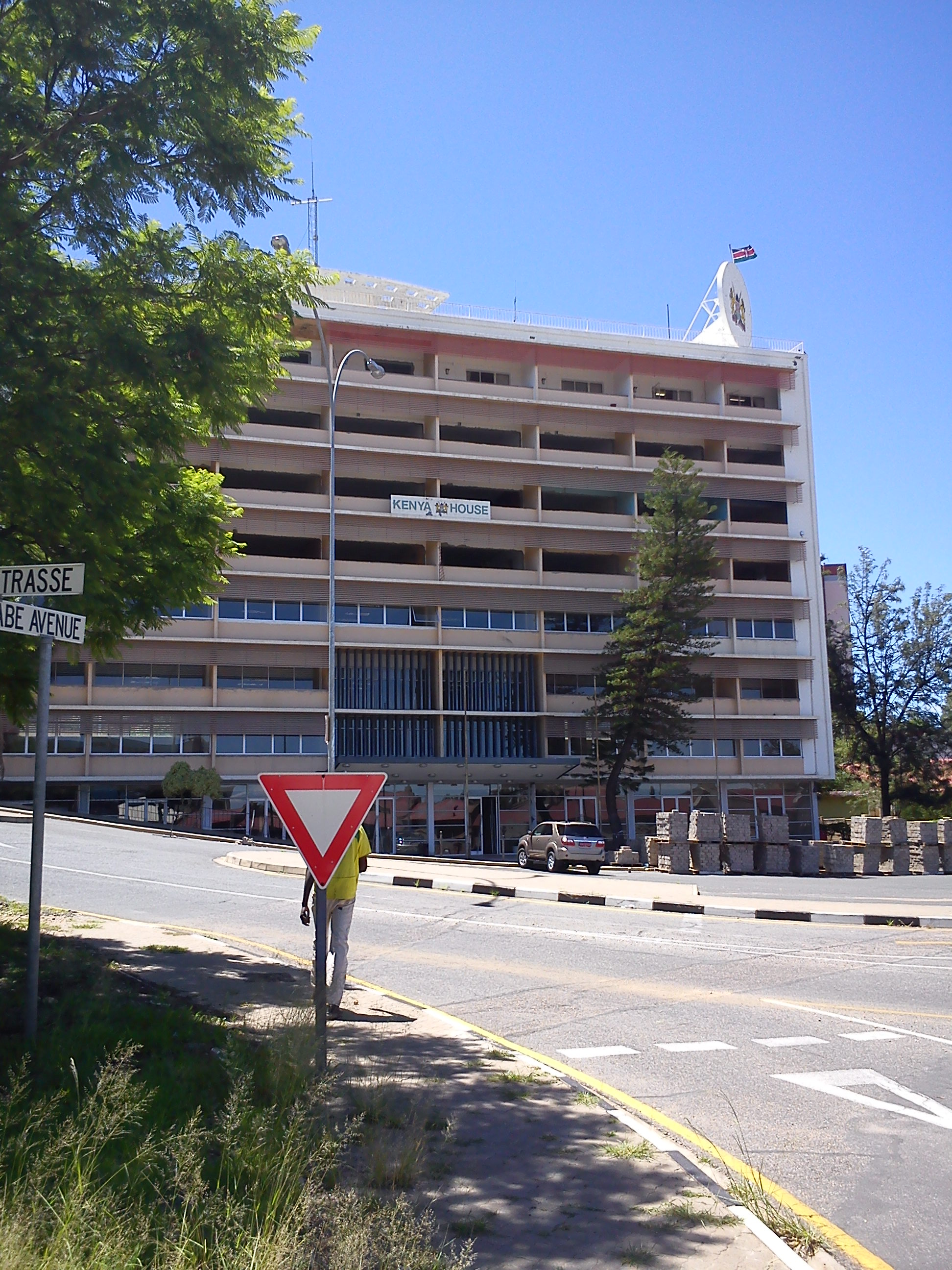
Kenyan high commission in Windhoek

In 2002 Kenya aided Namibia with nurses and other medical personnel who were deployed to various Namibian hospitals and health centres.

Kenya has an expat community of about 500 working in fields such as teaching, aviation, marine, engineering, quantity surveying, architecture and business. Over 30 Namibian students are also enrolled at Kenyan educational institutions.

Both countries are expected to have a Joint Commission on Cooperation soon to increase trade and bilateral cooperation.

== Diplomatic missions ==
- Kenya has a high commission in Windhoek.
- Namibia is accredited to Kenya from its high commission in Dar es Salaam, Tanzania.
