= Kenya–Sudan relations =

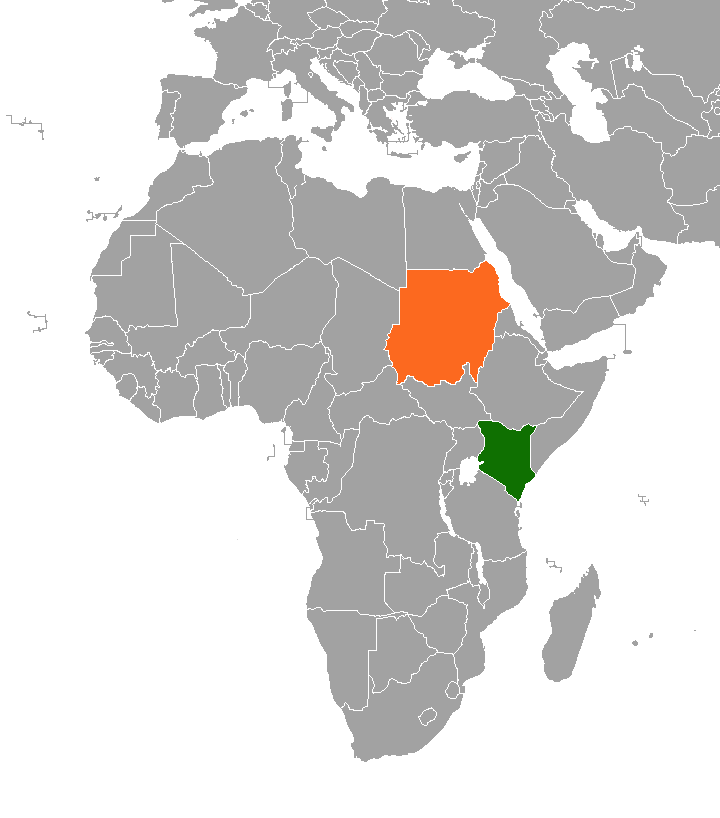

- Kenya: Sudan

Envoy
- Embassy of Kenya, HGRR+C63, Al Khurtum, Sudan: Embassy of Sudan, Kileleshwa Ngong Road, Kabarnet Rd, North, Kenya

Kenya–Sudan relations are the bilateral relations between the Republic of Kenya and the Republic of the Sudan.

== Historical relations ==
Kenya and other African Great Lakes nations were known supporters of the Sudan People's Liberation Movement freedom movement in what was then southern Sudan. The country hosted refugees and is suspected to have supplied armaments to South Sudanese rebels during the First Sudanese Civil War. Aid to the SPLM negatively affected general relations between Sudan and nearby countries, including Kenya.

== Military relations ==
Kenya played a crucial role in Sudanese peace efforts, hosting negotiations that led to the 2005 Comprehensive Peace Agreement, which contributed to the formation of South Sudan in 2011.

Investigations by research groups have found ammunition crates labeled with the Kenyan Ministry of Defense in areas previously controlled by the RSF in Khartoum. Upon this discovery, the Sudanese government officially accused Kenya of being a "main conduit" for Emirati military supplies. Both the UAE and Kenya have consistently and vehemently denied all claims, with Kenya stating the allegations were "false and misleading", and the UAE has dismissed the evidence as "lies, disinformation and propaganda," while also accusing Khartoum of making the claims up as a publicity stunt to evade recognition for its own actions.

== Political relations ==
In 2010, Sudanese leader Omar al-Bashir returned from a visit to Nairobi, although the ICC had issued a warrant for his arrest. In November 2011, a Kenyan court issued its own arrest warrant to Al-Bashir if he were to enter Kenya again. This led to diplomatic tension between both countries.

Additionally, Sudan and Kenya have been part of the talks aimed at ending the civil war in South Sudan.

In early 2024, Sudan recalled its ambassador to Kenya and accused Nairobi of supporting a parallel government for the RSF. Kenya defended its stance, arguing that its actions were aimed at promoting peace.

Under President William Ruto, Kenya has been accused of siding with Sudan’s Rapid Support Forces in the ongoing conflict against the Sudanese Armed Forces. In February 2025, Nairobi hosted RSF-aligned politicians for discussions on forming a parallel government, prompting Sudan to recall its ambassador and label Kenya a "rogue state."

== Economic relations ==
Kenya's strengthening ties with the United Arab Emirates, a country suspected of supporting the RSF, have added to economic friction with Sudan.

In response to Kenya’s hosting of the Sudanese RSF, Sudan imposed a Kenyan import ban in February 2024, significantly impacting Kenya’s exports and economic stability. The conflict, which began in April 2023, has already led to a 12% drop in tea exports.

== Diplomatic missions ==
- Sudan maintains an embassy in Nairobi.
- Kenya also has an embassy in Khartoum.
