= Jamaica–Kenya relations =

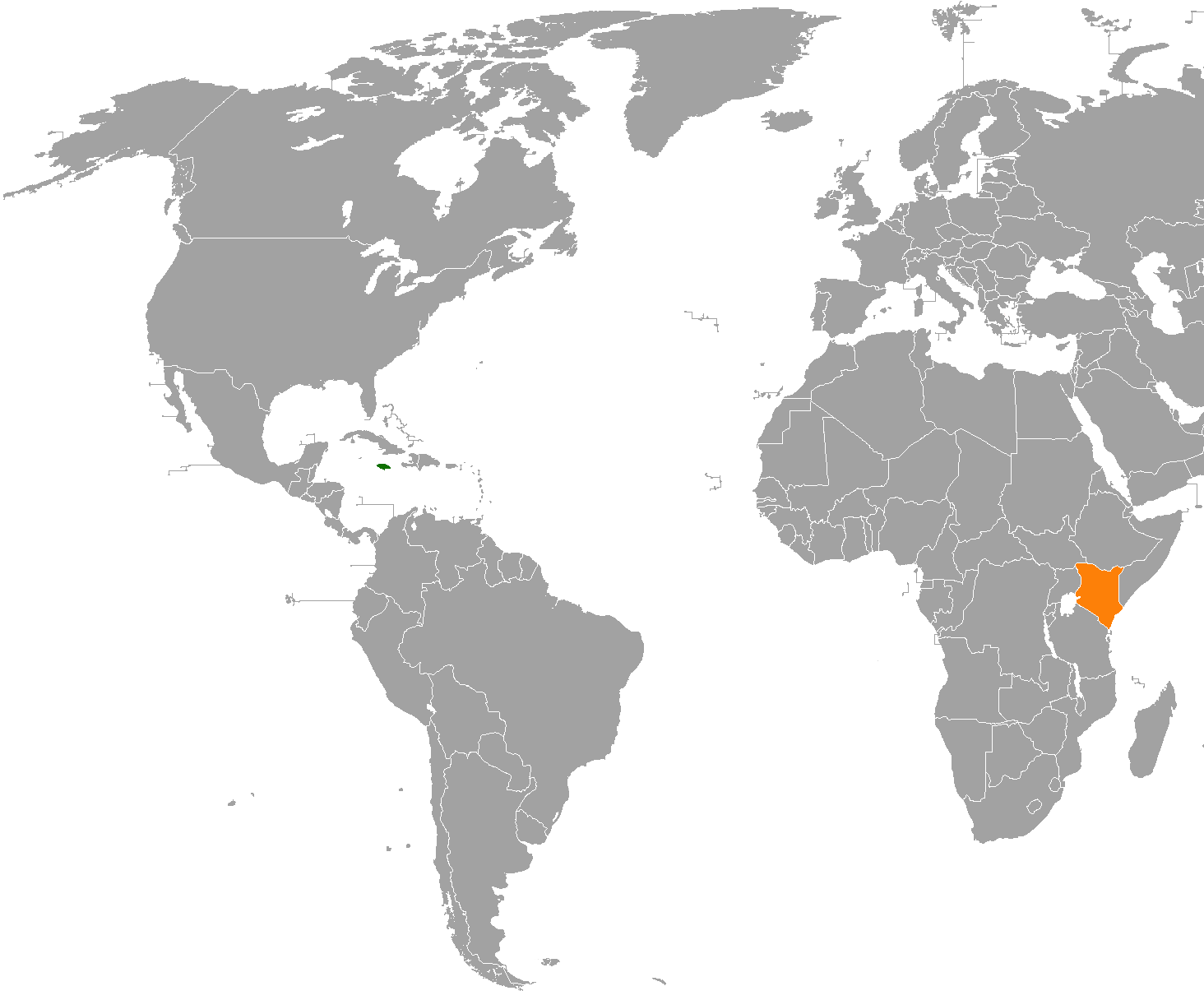

- Jamaica: Kenya

Jamaica–Kenya relations are bilateral relations between Jamaica and Kenya.

== History ==
Jamaica and Kenya established relations on 19 March 1976.

President Kenyatta made a state visit in August 2019. He met and held talks with Prime Minister Holness.

Kenyatta was the main guest for the celebration of the 57th Independence Day Jamaica. Both leaders (Holness and Kenyatta) also launched the celebrations to mark the International Decade for People of African Descent.

Governments of both nations have agreed to hold regular dialogues on trade, agriculture, tourism and health.

Both countries are members of the ACP States.

Prime Minister Holness is expected to attend the ACP States Summit to be hosted by Kenya in late 2019.

== Trade ==
While the Kenya National Chamber of Commerce and Industry and Jamaica Chamber of Commerce and Industry are keen to improve trade ties both governments acknowledge that trade between Kenya and Jamaica is almost nonexistent.

Nevertheless, Kenya is keen on increasing exports of basic commodities such as tea and coffee.

Kenya Airways plans to launch direct flights to Jamaica.

== Diplomatic missions ==
- Jamaica is accredited to Kenya from its high commission in Pretoria, South Africa.
- Kenya has a high commission in Kingston since 15 July 2026.
