= Kenya–Saudi Arabia relations =

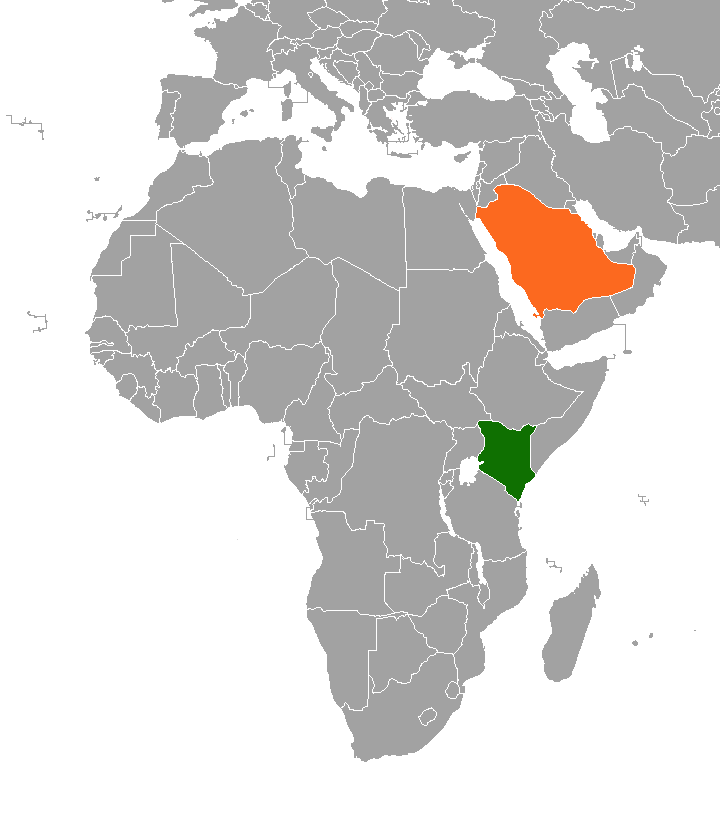
- Kenya: Saudi Arabia

Kenya–Saudi Arabia relations are bilateral relations between Kenya and Saudi Arabia.

== History ==
Relations between Saudi and Kenya are cordial. President Daniel arap Moi visited Saudi Arabia in 1979 and 1983. Foreign Minister Chirau Ali Mwakwere visited Saudi in 2005. President Mwai Kibaki also visited Saudi Arabia in 2012.

Kenya is keen on boosting tea sales and increasing Saudi tourists to Kenya.

A 2025 New York Times investigation found Kenyan workers in Saudi Arabia "had their passports confiscated, wages denied and food withheld. Some were beaten by their bosses for offenses as minor as not knowing how to operate a washing machine" and "At least 274 Kenyan workers, mostly women, have died in Saudi Arabia in the past five years". The Kenyan government has rolled back worker protections to increase profits for an industry which benefit Kenyan politicians including William Ruto's family and members of the Saudi royal family. Kenyans have been position "as among the cheapest, least-protected workers in the marketplace" with some websites displaying “add to cart” buttons next to workers photos. Children born to unmarried immigrants in Saudi Arabia "are routinely deprived of birth certificates, medical care and education, in violation of Saudi and international law" leaving hundreds of children "recognized by neither Saudi Arabia nor Kenya".

== Development cooperation ==
Saudi Arabia, through the Saudi Fund for Development, has funded multiple development projects in Kenya. Some of which are Nairobi Water Supply SR 55.84 million, Kenya-South Sudan Road SR 34.59 million, Thika-Garissa-Liboi Road SR 55.84 million, Mombasa Sewage SR 45.95 million, Kiambere Hydro Electricity Power SR 39.96 million, Agriculture Sector Support SR 15 million and Garissa Water Supply SR 31.41million.

In 2011, Saudi approved KES.1.6 billion loan to Kenya for the construction of the 146km Nuno-Mado Gashi road that will run between Garissa and Mandera towns. Saudi also approved KES.1.2 billion to fund five power projects.

Saudi also hosts about 20,000 Kenyan professional and domestic workers.

== Trade ==
In 2014, Kenyan imports from Saudi stood at KES. 28.22 billion (EUR. 265 million).

In 2013, Kenyan imports from Saudi stood at KES. 64 billion (EUR. 603 million). Total trade between both countries stood at KES. 68 billion (EUR. 636 million). This made Saudi the 9th largest trading partner of Kenya.

== Diplomatic missions ==
Saudi Arabia maintains an embassy in Nairobi. It is located in Muthaiga Road. Kenya has an embassy in Riyadh.
