= Kenya–Rwanda relations =

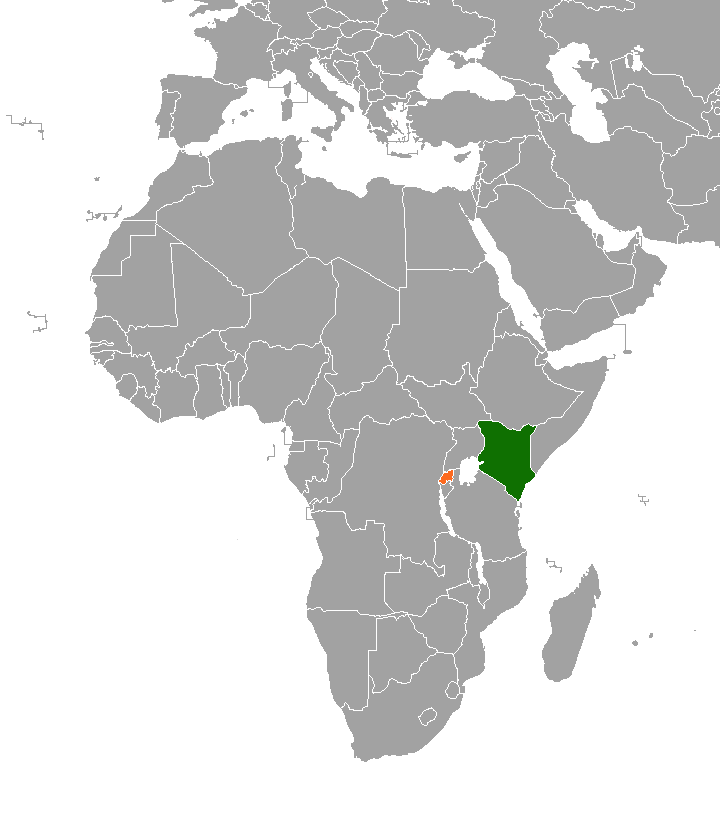
- Kenya: Rwanda

Kenya–Rwanda relations are the bilateral relations between Kenya and Rwanda. Kenya is a partner of Rwanda in many areas, particularly trade, security (military), education, agriculture and energy.

Kenya maintains a high commission in Kigali while Rwanda maintains one in Nairobi.

== Post Conflict ==
It is estimated that there are about 100,000 Rwandese immigrants in Kenya.

Both countries have on multiple occasions signed various memoranda of understanding. These MOUs involve co-operative technical assistance and development between the two countries.

Kenya has a significant expat community in Rwanda.

== High-level visits ==
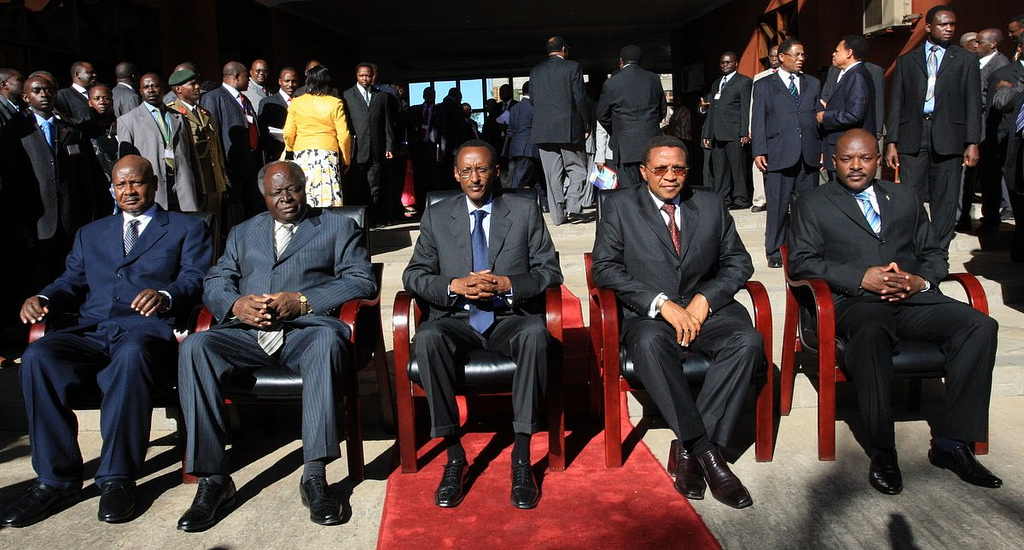
President Mwai Kibaki (Kenya) with, from left to right, Presidents Yoweri Museveni (Uganda), Paul Kagame (Rwanda), Jakaya Kikwete of (Tanzania), and Pierre Nkurunziza (Burundi) at an East African Community Head of States Meeting

Presidents of Rwanda and Kenya have on multiple occasions made state visits to each other country.

== Trade ==
In 2009, Kenya was the leading exporter to Rwanda. In 2013, Kenya was Rwanda's biggest trade partner.

Between the two years, (2009 and 2013), the Kenya Port Authority handled about 3.5 million Dead Weight Tonnage (DWT) of both imports and exports to Rwanda, Burundi and The DRC. Three quarters of this cargo went through Rwanda.

== FDI ==
The Rwanda Development Board (RDB) indicates that Kenya is Rwanda's top investor and trading partner. As of September 8, 2014 a total of 1,302 Kenyan companies had been registered in Rwanda, with the direct employment from these firms standing at about a quarter million Rwandans.

Since 2000 the RDB records state that 55 Kenyan investors ploughed roughly $400 million into Rwanda. Other Kenyan investors have at various points helped the Rwandan government mobilise close to $1 billion from external sources over the last 15 years.

Kenyan companies in Rwanda are mostly involved in finance and retail. Some of these companies are the KCB Group, the Equity Bank Group, I&M Bank Group and Nakumatt.

== Infrastructure ==
The two countries, together with Uganda, are working on building a standard gauge railway link that would go through Mombasa-Nairobi-Kampala-Kigali. Works began on the Kenyan section of the rail line in December 2014. There have been proposals to have the Mombasa-Nairobi-Kampala-Kigali expanded to a motorway all the way.

Kenya has been working with Rwanda to explore Rwandan geothermal energy potential.

== EAC membership ==
On July 1, 2007, Rwanda became a full member of the EAC. Rwanda joined the EAC Customs Union on 6 July 2009 and since then has been a close partner in terms of customs and trade integration.

=== Coalition of the Willing ===
The COW, which also includes South Sudan and Uganda, was described as an entity with multiple defence trade and immigration pacts. Even though it is not an official entity these states are described as the states making faster progress towards integration. In 2014 Kenya, Uganda and Rwanda came up with a single tourist visa which would allow tourists to visit all three countries using just one visa. In 2015, all three countries have also abolished work permits for citizens of the three countries.

== See also ==
- East African Community (EAC)
- African Free Trade Zone
