= Kenya–South Africa relations =

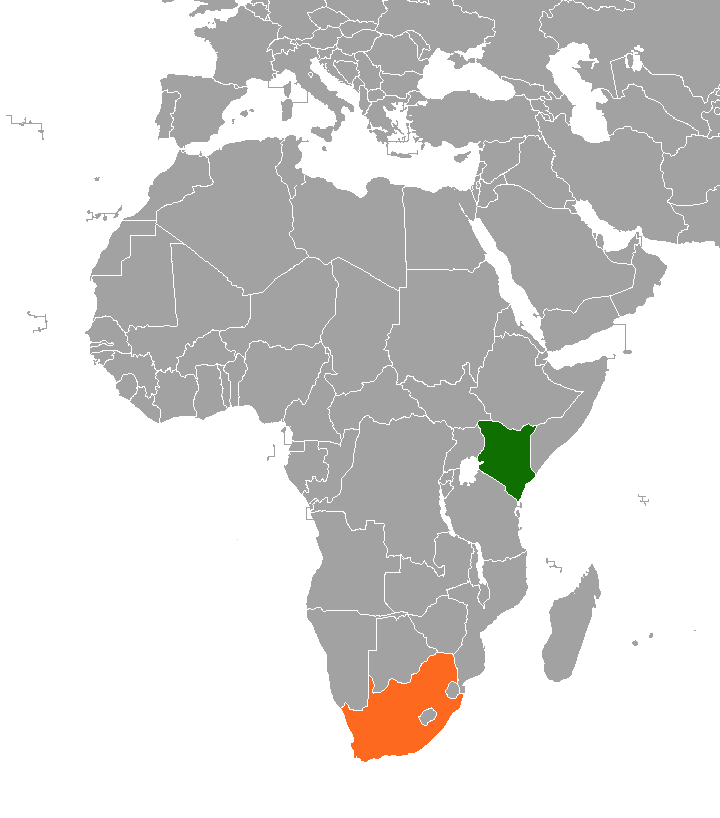
- Kenya: South Africa

Kenya–South Africa relations are bilateral relations between Kenya and South Africa.

== History ==
=== Apartheid ===
During South Africa's apartheid regime, cordial relations with Kenya were maintained as Kenya was one of Africa's leading pro-Western governments. These relations weren't publicized and didn't go beyond trade until 1990. In November 1990 South Africa's minister of foreign affairs, Pik Botha, visited Kenya in the first publicized ministerial-level contact between the two countries since 1960. Relations were further consolidated when President de Klerk visited Kenya in June 1991 and Kenyan president Daniel arap Moi visited Cape Town in June 1992; this was the first visit to South Africa by an African head of state.

Kenya's Government failed to exert enough pressure against South African regime over its apartheid policy for many years in various international forms. While Kenya supported resolutions by the OAU which prohibited any kind of interaction with South Africa, prominent Government officials still continued to act in a way which compromised its position.

It is suggested that Kenya heavily relied on European partners for trade so it couldn't fully comply with the OAU's resolutions. Others claim that it Kenya's principle of ‘non-interference’ which limited Kenya from playing a more robust role in South Africa's liberation struggle.

=== Post-apartheid ===
The history of relations is that Kenya, compared to Tanzania, for example, was not very supportive of the South African liberation struggle. It was against this background that relations between South Africa and Kenya were not very warm during the early days of post-apartheid.

Relations have gradually improved. Former President Uhuru Kenyatta of Kenya has visited Pretoria in an official capacity. Jacob Zuma has also visited Nairobi on the 11th of October 2016. Cyril Ramaphosa also visited Nairobi on the 9th of November 2022.

== Trade and economy ==
In early 2013, Kenya and South Africa were said to be working on a preferential trade agreement that could eliminate administrative barriers and boost exchange of goods and services between the two nations. A joint trade committee was formed in 2011 to resolve trade barriers.

South Africa has increased its chunk of Kenya's market in the last 10 years to become the fifth largest source of imports after shipping in Kes.73.8 billion ($810 million) worth of goods in 2011. In comparison, official statistics showing that Kenya only managed to export just Kes.2.8 billion ($31 million) over the period. However, the rapid growth of imports from South Africa is driven mainly by demand, not cordial bilateral relations.

Numerous South African companies have operations in Kenya. They operate in sectors such as banking, insurance, accountancy, pharmaceuticals, retail, tourism and engineering. FirstRand Bank, Standard Bank, Old Mutual and SABMiller are just some of the major South African firms with operations in Kenya.

== Diplomatic missions ==
- Kenya has a high commission in Pretoria.
- South Africa has a high commission in Nairobi.

== See also ==
- African Economic Community
