= Democratic Republic of the Congo–Kenya relations =

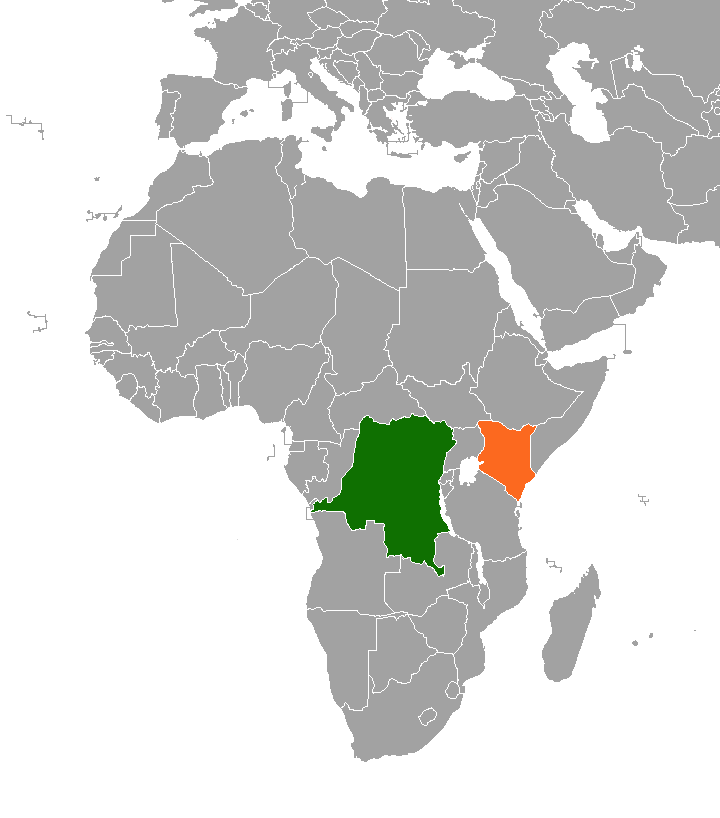
- DR Congo: Kenya

Democratic Republic of the Congo–Kenya relations are bilateral relations between Kenya and Democratic Republic of the Congo. The DRC is a strategic partner of Kenya in many areas, particularly trade and security.

Kenya maintains an embassy in Kinshasa and the Democratic Republic of the Congo in Nairobi.

== History ==
Former President Kabila of the DRC visited Kenya on multiple occasions. On one of the occasions he met with Former President Kibaki to discuss issues pertaining gold smuggled from mines in Kivu, Eastern DRC. The gold smuggling business has been thought to fund the rebels in DRC. Further investigations revealed that Kenya was at the centre of the multi-billion shilling gold smuggling ring, spanning several countries. These revelations didn't dent Kenya's relationship with the DRC.

President Kenyatta was the only foreign head of state to attend President Tshisekedi's inauguration.

President Tshisekedi reciprocated the visit by Kenyatta by visiting Nairobi in early 2019. The leaders held talks centered on security and stability in the DRC with President Kenyatta offering to also train Congolese civil servants.

=== Peace deal with M23 ===
The peace deal between the Government of the DRC and leaders of the M23 rebellion was brokered by multiple parties and was signed in Nairobi in late 2013. M23 was routed in a UN-backed offensive by government troops. Under the deal there would be no amnesty for those wanted for war crimes. The deal was hosted by Uhuru Kenyatta, the President of Kenya.

Kenya has also been a key partner in stabilising Eastern DRC.

=== Joint Commission for Cooperation ===
By the end of 2014 both countries were to sign a Joint Commission for Cooperation. Under the agreement Kenya was to establish a consulate in Goma and DRC in Mombasa The deal would help deepen trade and investment between both countries.

The deal would be Kenya's first major trade agreement with a Francophone African country. The trade agreement will offer Kenya preferential access to the Central Africa state, which has a population of 90 million people.

== Culture ==
Both countries are inhabited by significant Swahili speaking populations, Swahili is the national language in both countries. Kenya and the DRC share some cultural similarities.

== Trade and economy ==
The DRC, is a net importer of Kenyan agricultural and manufactured goods. As Eastern DRC is largely landlocked it accesses international waters through ports in Kenya and Tanzania.
