= Kenya–South Sudan relations =

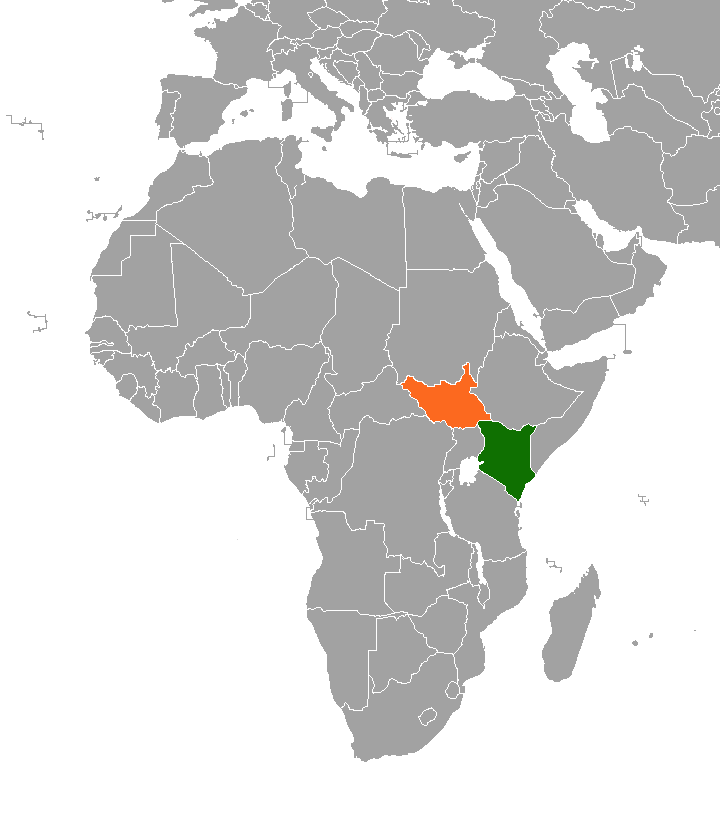

- Kenya: South Sudan

Kenya–South Sudan relations are bilateral relations between South Sudan and Kenya. South Sudan is a strategic partner of Kenya in many areas. Both countries have cultural similarities as many people from South Sudan lived in Kenya before independence.

There are disagreements regarding the border between the two countries in the Ilemi Triangle.

== Pre Independence ==
Kenya is said to have contributed to South Sudan's independence. The Machakos Protocol signed in Kenya in 2002 saw a ceasefire signed between Sudan and the Southern Sudanese. It was the first of many agreements that led to the creation of Southern Sudan autonomous region which later on led to the independence of South Sudan in 2011. During the independence movement leaders of the freedom movement lived in Kenya. At the peak of the second Sudanese civil war Kenya hosted about 100,000 South Sudanese people. Kenya was among South Sudan's neighbours accused of supplying arms to the fighters in South Sudan

== Post Independence ==
Kenya and South Sudan have agreed in areas of cooperation which aims to build up the ability of the South Sudanese to run a government. Notably Kenya Foreign Service has been training South Sudanese officials in diplomatic and other related affairs. Kenya's support to South Sudan included addressing issues related to peace, insecurity, and post conflict reconstruction among others.

== State visits ==
President Salva Kiir visited Kenya in mid 2019. He met and held talks with President Kenyatta and the talks were mainly centered on peace and stability in South Sudan.

President Kenyatta has himself made several trips to South Sudan and vice versa.

With both countries being members of the EAC and IGAD relations remain close and both leaders make numerous visits.

== Trade ==
Kenyan exports to South Sudan stood at US$57.6 million in 2005 and increased to US$144.5 million in 2008. In 2009, trade declined to US$137.5 million, but later picked up to a record high of US$207.3 million in 2010.

South Sudan re-exports dominate the commodities traded with Kenya. The only product that was produced in South Sudan and exported to Kenya was wood; contributing US$0.0068 million in 2005.

=== FDI ===
Many Kenyan firms have established branches in South Sudan. Some of these firms are involved in the financial sector notably Kenya Commercial Bank South Sudan which controls 50 percent of the market share. KCB has 21 branches in South Sudan and is the largest financial services provider in South Sudan. Other Kenyan owned banks operating in South Sudan are Equity Bank and Cooperative Bank.

=== Infrastructure ===
The Kenyan and South Sudanese governments are working together to build infrastructural links between the countries. The road link between Kitale and Juba is slated for rehabilitation.

In the future both countries are to be connected by rail as part of the LAPSSET programme. Lamu and Juba will be connected by road as part of the programme. The programme will provide South Sudan with an alternative port for its oil pipelines. The pipeline will run from Lamu (Kenya) to South Sudanese oilfields. The entire LAPSSET project will provide South Sudan another access to world markets.

== Civil war in South Sudan ==
Kenya through IGAD and other regional intergovernmental authorities has been involved in resolving the civil war that began on December 15, 2013. The Kenyan government has been part of the team that has tried to make both parties sign a ceasefire. Both countries are also part of IGAD, an intergovernmental organisation initially charged with development and environmental regulation. IGAD has since expanded into other areas of regional cooperation. South Sudan joined IGAD in 2011.

== Diplomatic missions ==
- South Sudan maintains an embassy in Nairobi.
- Kenya maintains an embassy in Juba.

== See also ==
- LAPSSET
- Machakos Protocol
- Ilemi Triangle, an area disputed between Kenya and South Sudan
