= List of international presidential trips made by William Ruto =

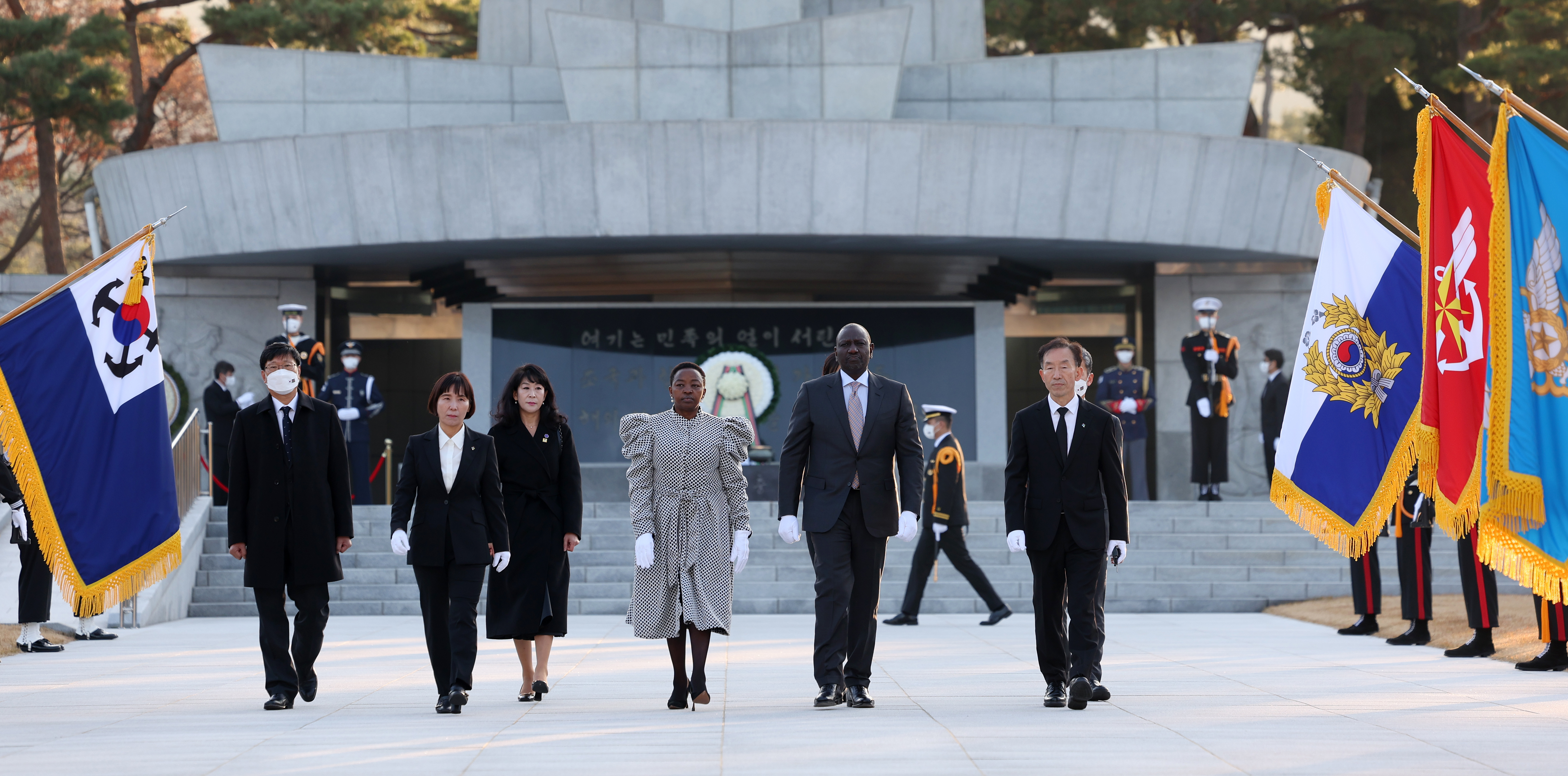
Ruto's visit to the Seoul National Cemetery November 2022.

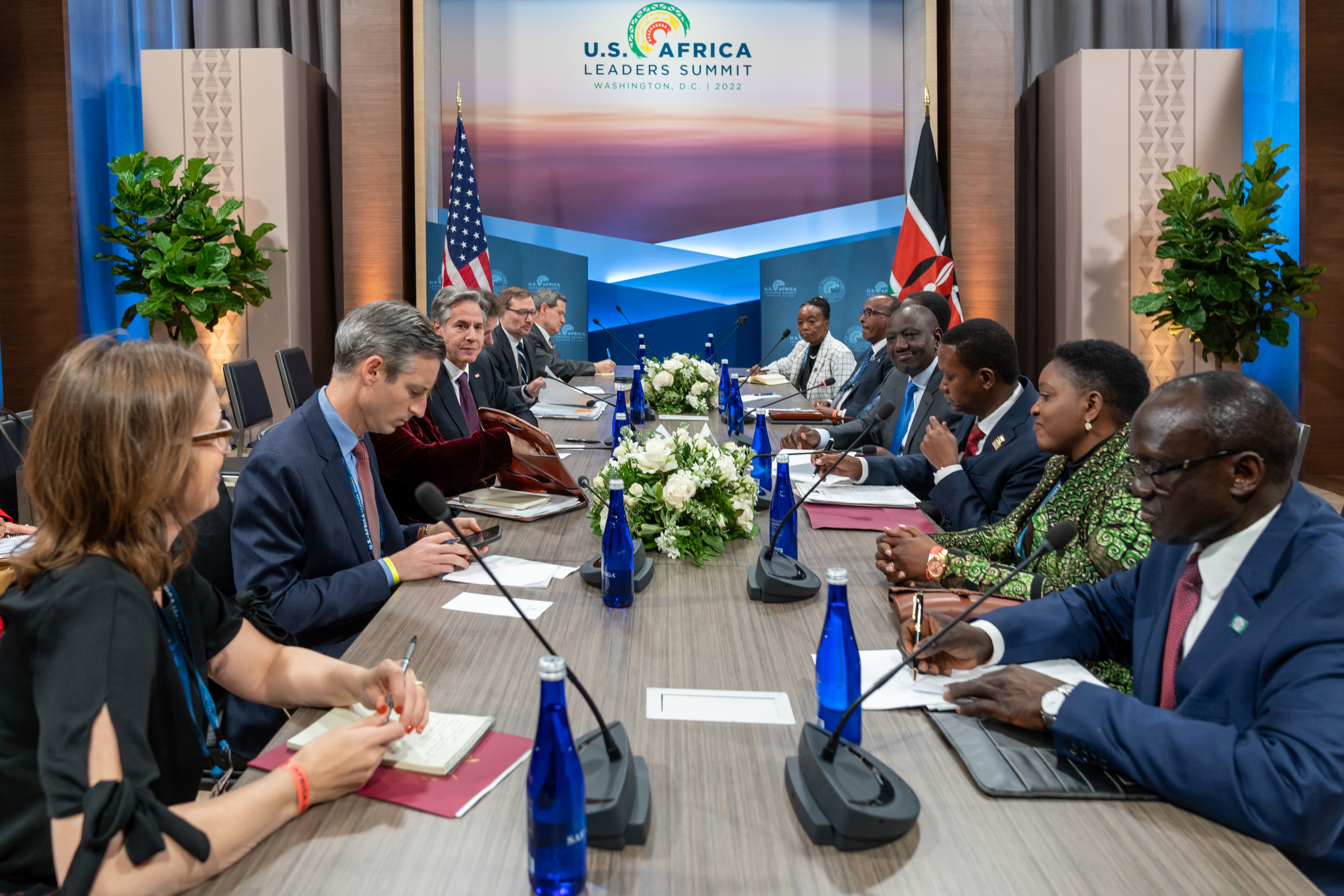
Secretary of State Antony J. Blinken meets with Ruto, on the margins of the US–Africa Leaders Summit 2022.

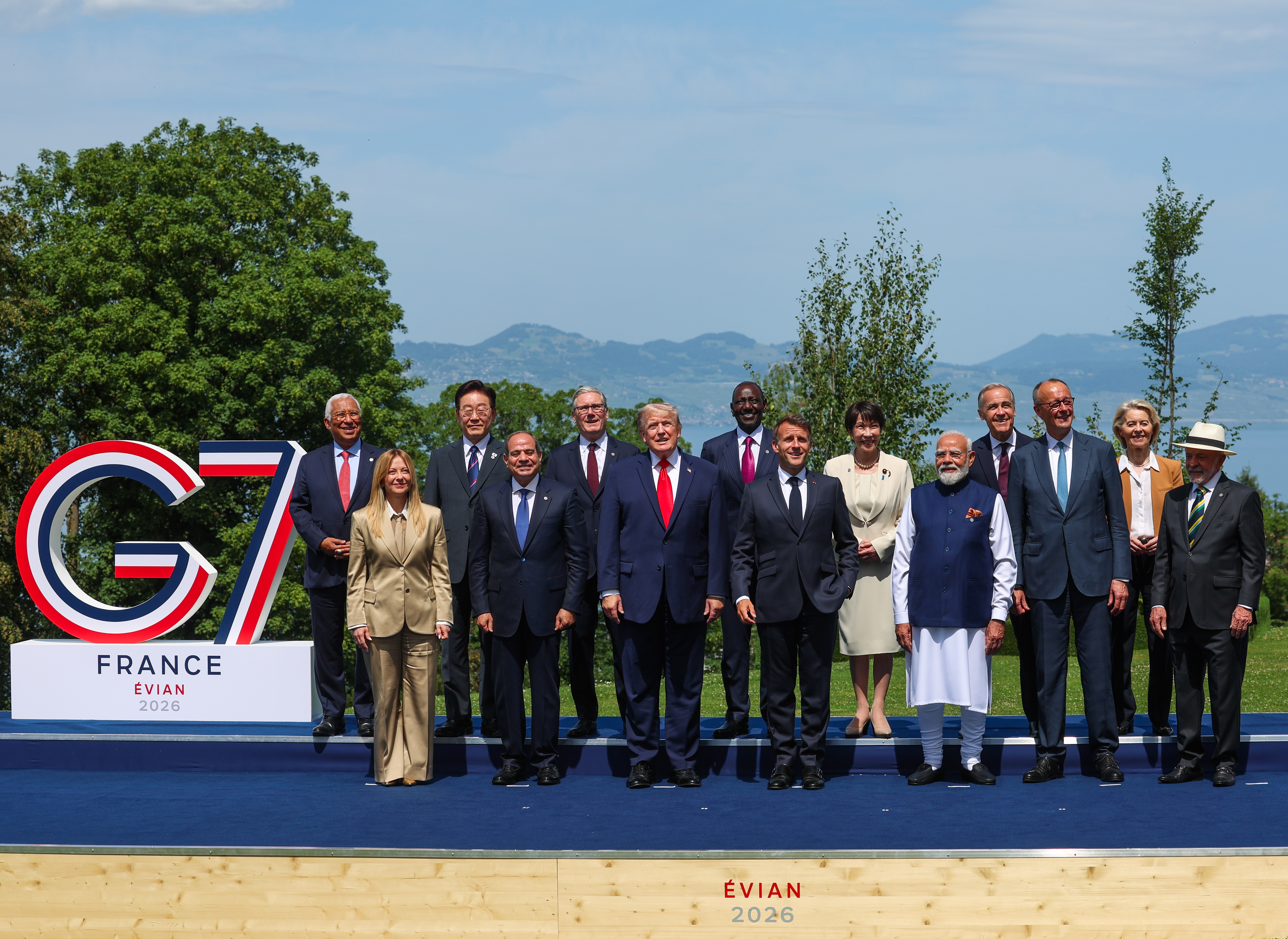
Ruto attending the 52nd G7 summit held in Évian-les-Bains, France.

William Ruto became President of Kenya on 13 September 2022 following his victory in the 2022 Kenyan general election. While William Ruto travelled extensively for official business as Deputy President of Kenya, the following only includes a list of international presidential trips made by William Ruto since assuming office as President of Kenya.

== Summary of international trips ==
Map showing international trips made by Ruto as president 1 visit 2 visits 3 visits 4+ visits Kenya

Number of Visits	Country
1 visit	Azerbaijan, Comoros, Central African Republic, Djibouti, Equatorial Guinea, Eritrea, Guinea-Bissau, Haiti, India, Israel, Finland, Kazakhstan, Madagascar, Mozambique, Netherlands, Norway, Qatar, Russia, Senegal, Somalia, South Sudan, Spain, Vatican City, Zambia, Zimbabwe
2 visits	Angola, Belgium, Democratic Republic of the Congo, Egypt, Ghana, Japan, Namibia, Nigeria, Norway, Republic of the Congo, Saudi Arabia, South Africa, South Korea, Switzerland
3 visits	Burundi, China, Germany, Italy, Rwanda, United Arab Emirates,
4+ visits	France (5), Uganda (5), United Kingdom (4), United States (8), Ethiopia (9), Tanzania (9)

== 2022 ==
The following international trips were made by William Ruto in 2022.

Country	Areas visited	Date(s)	Purpose(s)	Notes
United Kingdom	London	19–20 September	State funeral of Elizabeth II	Details William Ruto attended the State funeral of Queen Elizabeth II along with various African Heads of States.
United States	New York City, NY	20–24 September	Seventy-seventh session of the United Nations General Assembly	Details William Ruto attended his first UNGA meeting as president in 2022. He addressed the General Debate on September 21, with a focus on debt relief and climate change. William Ruto also had the following meetings on the sidelines with: UN Secretary General, António Guterres; Prime Minister of Jamaica, Andrew Holness; United States Secretary of State, Antony Blinken; World Health Organization Director General, Tedros Adhanom Ghebreyesus; IGAD Executive Secretary, Workneh Gebeyehu; African Development Bank President, Akinwumi Adesina; Prime Minister of Portugal, António Costa; Prime Minister of Antigua and Barbuda, Gaston Browne; Prime Minister of Saint Kitts and Nevis, Terrance Drew; Along with these meetings, President Ruto also attended the US-Kenya Business Forum, United Nations Development Programme's Africa Investment Partnership Forum and a state dinner hosted by US president Joe Biden.
Ethiopia	Addis Ababa	6 October	Launch of Safaricom Telecommunications Ethiopia	Details William Ruto began his first regional tour and made a day trip to Addis to participate in the launch of Safaricom Kenya's Ethiopian subsidiary. The president also held bilateral talks with prime minister Abiy Ahmed.
Uganda	Kampala	8–9 October	State visit – Uganda 60th Independence Day celebrations	See also: Kenya–Uganda relations Details William Ruto made a two-day visit to Uganda to attended the 60th Independence Day celebrations held in Uganda.
Tanzania	Dar es Salaam	9–10 October	State visit	See also: Kenya–Tanzania relations Details William Ruto made a two-day visit to Tanzania after attending Independence Day celebrations in Uganda. The trip is the final destination in the president's regional tour. The president held various bilateral meetings and addressed the state house along with his Tanzanian counterpart Samia Suluhu Hassan. Topics such as investments, infrastructure, security and movement of people were discussed.
Egypt	Sharm El Sheikh	6–8 November	2022 United Nations Climate Change Conference	Details William Ruto attended the COP27 conference held in Egypt. President Ruto addressed the assembly and focused his speech on reforestation and green energy. During the summit, William Ruto held a separate meeting with African leaders and held bilateral talks with various leaders on the sidelines of the summit: Paul Kagame (Rwanda), Azali Assoumani (Comoros), Esperança da Costa (Angola). Ruto also held bilateral talks with leaders of other countries and multi-lateral organizations: Rishi Sunak – United Kingdom. The two ink deals worth $5bn in investments in Kenya.; Kristalina Georgieva – IMF; Zuzana Čaputová – Slovakia; Olaf Scholz – Germany; Akinwumi Adesina – African Development Bank; Separately the heads of state of the East Africa Community held a private roundtable with Angola to discuss the situation of the M23 offensive in the DRC
Democratic Republic of Congo	Kinshasa	21 November	State visit	Details William Ruto met with President Félix Tshisekedi at the state house in Kinshasa to discuss the mandate of the East African Community Regional Force (EACRF) in the DRC against the M23 offensive.
South Korea	Seoul	22–24 November	State visit	See also: Kenya–South Korea relations Details William Ruto held bilateral talks with President Yoon Suk-yeol to strengthen co-operation in ICT, education, pharmaceutical and infrastructure. The president met with Kenyans living in South Korea and attended a business forum.
Eritrea	Asmara	9–10 December	State visit	See also: Eritrea–Kenya relations Details William Ruto held bilateral talks with President of Eritrea Isaias Afwerki. The leaders discussed on how to increase trade and improve bilateral economic relations between the countries. The Duo also agreed to abolish visa requirements for its respective citizens.
United States	Washington, D.C., New York City	13–16 December	United States–Africa Leaders Summit 2022	Details William Ruto attended the US-Africa Leaders summit hosted by President Joe Biden. On the sidelines of the summit, President Ruto met: Rajiv Shah the President of the Rockefeller Foundation, where they discussed collaborating in expanding green energy in Kenya.; John Nkengasong the US ambassador of the President's Emergency Plan for AIDS Relief program.; Pravind Jugnauth, the prime minister of Mauritius.; Ismaïl Omar Guelleh, president of Djibouti.; At the summit, the leaders of East Africa along with João Lourenço of Angola discussed the ongoing Conflict in DRC. At the US Business forum, president Ruto met with various US executives to discuss further partnerships in business. On Friday December 16, President Ruto rings the closing bell at the New York Stock Exchange.

== 2023 ==
The following international trips were made by William Ruto in 2023.

Country	Areas visited	Date(s)	Purpose(s)	Notes
France	Paris	24 January	State visit	See also: France–Kenya relations Details William Ruto met with president Emmanuel Macron and held bilateral talks about France's involvement in infrastructure projects in Kenya along with potential funding for the East African Regional Force operating in the Eastern Democratic Republic of Congo.
Senegal	Dakar	25–26 January	Feed Africa Summit	Details Ruto along with various African leaders attended the Feed Africa Dakar 2 Summit. Ruto was a keynote speaker on Food, Sovereignty and Resilience. The summit hosted by the African Development Bank pledged to increase its investment in continental food production. At the end of the summit, Ruto officially opened the Kenyan embassy in Senegal.
Somalia	Mogadishu	31 January – 1 February	Somalia Frontline States Summit	See also: Somali Civil War (2009–present) and African Union Mission in Somalia Details Ruto, alongside Ethiopia's Prime Minister Abiy Ahmed and Djibouti's President Ismaïl Omar Guelleh, participated in an anti-terrorism summit organized by Somali President Hassan Sheikh Mohamud in Mogadishu.
Burundi	Bujumbura	4 February	20th Extraordinary summit of EAC heads of state	See also: M23 campaign (2022–present) Details Ruto along with all other heads of states (minus Salva Kiir of South Sudan) from the East African Community attended the emergency summit hosted by EAC chair Évariste Ndayishimiye in Bujumbura. The summit was focused on the evaluation of the security situation in the Eastern Democratic Republic of Congo.
Ethiopia	Addis Ababa	17–19 February	36th ordinary Session of the African Union (AU) Assembly	Details Ruto made his first visit to an African Union Assembly summit since assuming office. The summit focused on food security on the continent. On the sidelines of the summit, President Ruto met: António Guterres, Secretary General of the UN; Charles Michel, President of the European Council; Hassan Sheikh Mohamud, President of Somalia; Also on the sidelines of the summit, Ruto, EAC leaders & João Lourenço discussed their ongoing intervention in DRC.
Germany	Berlin	27–28 March	9th Berlin Energy Transition Dialogue	Details Ruto attended The 9th Berlin Energy Transition Dialogue along with representatives from 90 other countries. Ruto was a keynote speaker where he declared Kenya's goal of attaining one hundred percent renewables for power supply by the year 2030. After the conference also held bilateral talks with German chancellor Olaf Scholz.
Belgium	Brussels	29–30 March	State visit	Details Ruto held bilateral talks with the prime minister of Belgium Alexander De Croo, where they discussed health, food security, drought response, climate action, trade and investment. President of the European Council Charles Michel also held talks with Ruto.
Rwanda	Kigali	4–5 April	State visit	See also: Kenya–Rwanda relations Details This was Ruto's first state visit to Rwanda since becoming president where he met Paul Kagame. Both leaders discussed various bilateral issues and signed various agreements. Both presidents signed and ratified East Africa One Area Network for Mobile.
Uganda	Kampala	26 April	Heads of State Summit	See also: African Union Mission to Somalia Details William Ruto made a day visit to Uganda to discuss with regional leaders at the "Heads of State Summit of the Troop Contributing countries to the African Union Transition Mission in Somalia". Heads of state from Somalia, Djibouti, Burundi, and Ethiopia were all present along with the host Yoweri Museveni. With increasing conflicts in the area, Kenya is increasing its role to help stabilize the region.
United Kingdom	London	6–7 May	Coronation of Charles III and Camilla	Details William Ruto attended the coronation of Charles III and Camilla along with various heads of states of the Commonwealth of Nations. On the sidelines, Ruto also held bilateral talks with various British investors to invest in Kenya.
Netherlands	The Hague, Rotterdam	7–8 May	Summit	Details William Ruto attended the Global Center on Adaptation (GCA) in Rotterdam to participate in a Strategic Dialogue on the Africa Climate Action Summit. After the summit, President Ruto held bilateral talks with King Willem-Alexander of the Netherlands.
Israel	Jerusalem	9–10 May	State visit	See also: Israel–Kenya relations Details Ruto made his first state visit to Israel. Ruto first met with Israeli president Isaac Herzog and held bilateral talks before heading to meet with Prime Minister Benjamin Netanyahu. Along with various high-level delegates from both countries, the two leaders signed various agreements in cooperation in agriculture, trade, education and security. This is the first high level visit between both countries after Ruto changed Kenya's stance on voting for Israel at the United Nations. After the visit, Ruto visited the World Holocaust Remembrance Center and the Western Wall for prayers.
South Africa	Midrand	17 May	3rd Pan African Parliamentarians Summit	Details Ruto attended the 3rd Pan African Parliamentarians Summit on Climate Policy and Equity.
Burundi	Bujumbura	31 May	21st Extraordinary summit of EAC heads of state	See also: M23 campaign (2022–present) Details A summit was convened by Burundi and other prominent members of the East African community, aiming to address the involvement of the East African Community Regional Force (EACRF) in the eastern region of Congo. The Democratic Republic of Congo had expressed its intention to terminate the force's mandate in peacekeeping amidst the M23 offensive. As part of the summit's proceedings, the forces mandate was extended and Aphaxxard Muthuri was formally appointed as the new force commander.
Zambia	Lusaka	7–8 June	22nd Common Market for Eastern and Southern Africa (COMESA) heads of State and Government Summit	Details Ruto attended his first COMESA summit. During his keynote, Ruto proposed a single currency for Africa.
Djibouti	Djibouti City	11–12 June	State visit & ordinary summit of Intergovernmental Authority on Development	Details Ruto attended the Intergovernmental Authority on Development ordinary summit where the countries tried to deliberate the situation in the ongoing Sudan conflict. The members agreed to attempt to have direct talks with the Sudanese generals. Before the summit, Ruto met with Ismaïl Omar Guelleh, president of Djibouti and held bilateral talks. They established the Kenya-Djibouti business council and Ruto declared the abolishment of visa requirements for Djibouti citizens to Kenya.
Switzerland	Geneva	15–16 June	111th annual International Labour Organisation conference	Details Ruto attended the 111th annual International Labour Organisation conference in Geneva. Ruto delivered a keynote speech at the conference. Prior to the speech, he also held bilateral talks with the Gilbert F Houngbo, the Director-General of the International Labour Organisation.
France	Paris	22–23 June	Global Pact Finance Summit	Details Ruto participated in the Global Pact Finance summit held in Paris, France. This summit held significant importance for the Ruto administration, as the president persistently advocated for the establishment of new Multilateral Finance Institutions amidst foreign exchange shortages prevalent across the global south due to the strengthening US dollar. Furthermore, Ruto took the opportunity to engage with Parisian youth at Champ de Mars during the Global Citizen Festival, where he discussed climate policies and extended an invitation to attend the Africa Climate Summit scheduled to take place in Nairobi in September.
Comoros	Moroni	6 July	State visit	Details Ruto was a guest of honor at the 48th independence anniversary of the Comoros islands. Ruto was invited by president Azali Assoumani where they held bilateral talks in increased economic co-operation. Ruto announced the abolition of tourist visas of Comoros citizens to Kenya by the end of 2023 and encouraged them to apply to join the East African Community. After the ceremony, Ruto was honored with the highest award in Comoros the Grand Cross of the Green Crescent of the Comoros.
Republic of Congo	Brazzaville, Oyo	7–8 July	State visit	Details Ruto presided over a Kenya-Congolese business forum along with counterpart Denis Sassou Nguesso. After this event the two presidents signed various MoUs in trade and investment, energy, ICT, transport, security, education, tourism, culture, agriculture, and the blue economy. Ruto announced that Kenya will abolish tourist visa requirements for citizens of the Republic of Congo. Ruto also announced the resumption of Kenya airways flights along with the fast track of opening a resident mission in Brazzaville. Ruto also visited president Nguesso's private farm where he held talks with Central African Republic president Faustin-Archange Touadéra.
Ethiopia	Addis Ababa	10 July	IGAD Summit	See also: 2023 Sudan conflict Details Officials from the IGAD group of countries met in Ethiopia to discuss the peace road map in Sudan.
Tanzania	Dar es Salaam	25–26 July	World Bank Africa Human Capital Heads of State Summit	Details Ruto attended the Africa Human Capital Heads of State Summit hosted by Samia Suluhu in Dar es Salaam. The summit was attended by several African heads of state.
Mozambique	Maputo	10–12 August	State visit	See also: Kenya–Mozambique relations Details Ruto made a two-day state visit to Mozambique, where he held bilateral talks with his counterpart Filipe Nyusi. Several MoUs were signed between the two countries and both leaders also attended the Mozambique-Kenya business investment forum.
Uganda	Kampala	13 August	State visit	See also: Kenya–Uganda relations Details William Ruto made a day trip to Kampala to discuss bilateral relations with president Yoweri Museveni.
Tanzania	Dar es Salaam	7 September	Africa Food Systems Forum 2023	Details William Ruto attended the Africa Food Systems Forum in Tanzania along with various other local regional leaders.
United States	California, New Jersey, Washington, D.C., New York City	15–25 September	Business visit and Seventy-eighth session of the United Nations General Assembly	Details Ruto made a 10-day visit to the United States where he attended several events promoting Kenya and Kenyan businesses before he concluded his visit by attending the United Nations General Assembly.: Between September 15–16, Ruto attended a business forum in the Silicon valley where he met with various tech executives. Ruto met with CEO Tim Cook (Apple), Patrick Gelsinger (Intel), CFO Ruth Porat (Alphabet), COO Brad Smith (Microsoft) and other executives from Microsoft, Nike, GAP and Levi Strauss.; September 18, Ruto officially opened a Kenyan restaurant in New Jersey named Swahili Village.; September 19, Ruto met with Millennium Challenge Corporation CEO, Alice Albright to sign a US$60m program to help electrify busses that operate in Nairobi.; On the sidelines of the UNGA summit, president Ruto held bilateral talks with various foreign heads of states such as: President of Albania, Bajram Begaj and encouraged him to open an embassy in Kenya.; President of Slovakia, Zuzana Čaputová, and discussed supporting Kenya's E-mobility along with growing partnerships to enhance Kenya's fertiliser production and cybersecurity capacity.; President of Kosovo, Vjosa Osmani; Prime Minister Mette Frederiksen of Denmark along with Prime Minister Ulf Kristersson of Sweden to discuss supporting peace initiatives in the Horn of Africa.; Vice President of The Gambia, Muhammad Jallow; President of Ukraine, Volodymyr Zelenskyy, to committing to establishing a grain hub in the Port of Mombasa to address food shortage in East Africa.; Prime Minister of Italy, Giorgia Meloni.; President of Angola, João Lourenço; President of Switzerland, Alain Berset.; President of the Dominican Republic, Luis Abinader, where both leaders agreed on various bilateral trade agreements along with Dominican assistance to the Kenyan UN mission to Haiti.; President of Cuba, Miguel Díaz-Canel, where continued cooperation was discussed in the healthsector between the two countries along with assistance to the Kenyan UN mission to Haiti; President of Kazakhstan, Kassym-Jomart Tokayev.; President of Portugal, Marcelo Rebelo de Sousa.; Managing Director of the International Monetary Fund, Kristalina Georgieva.; Prime Minister of Canada, Justin Trudeau.
China	Beijing	15–18 October	Third Belt and Road Initiative summit	See also: China–Kenya relations Details Ruto made his way to Beijing to participate in the tenth-anniversary summit of the Belt and Road Initiative. On the inaugural day, Ruto engaged in discussions with numerous prominent figures in the Chinese industry. During this time, Kenya and China's Energy International Group formalized a memorandum of understanding aimed at boosting investments in renewable energy within Kenya. Furthermore, Ruto held meetings with the leadership of the Chinese telecommunication company, Huawei, resulting in the signing of Memorandums of Understanding to expedite Kenya's digital transformation. On the sidelines of the Belt and Road Initiative summit, President Ruto engaged in talks with Pakistan's Prime Minister Anwaar-ul-Haq Kakar. Following the summit's conclusion, Ruto engaged in bilateral discussions with Chinese President Xi Jinping.
Saudi Arabia	Riyadh	24–25 October	Future Investment Initiative	Details Ruto made a trip to Saudi Arabia to attend the Saudi Future Investment Initiative summit. Before the summit Ruto held bilateral talks with Saudi Crown Prince Mohammed bin Salman. Ruto gave a keynote address at the FII Summit.
Republic of Congo	Brazzaville	28 October	Three Basins Summit	Details Ruto attended the Three Basins Summit hosted in Brazzaville. During the summit, Ruto announced that Kenya will end visitor visa requirements to all African visitors by the end of the year.
Saudi Arabia	Riyadh	10–11 November	Saudi Arabia – Africa Summit	Details Ruto attended the inaugural Saudi Arabia – Africa summit along with various other heads of states from Africa. On the sidelines of the summit the president held talks with the following: Yasir bin Othman Al-Rumayyan, Saudi Investment Fund Governor.; Salva Kiir, President of South Sudan.; Abdulaziz bin Salman (Minister for Energy of Saudi Arabia) and Mohammed Al-Jadaan (Minister for Finance of Saudi Arabia).
Germany	Berlin	20–21 November	5th G20 Compact with Africa (CwA) Summit	Details Ruto participated in the 5th G20 Compact with Africa (CwA) Summit held in Berlin, Germany. During the summit, he engaged in discussions with German Chancellor Olaf Scholz on topics such as trade, investment, environmental conservation, and industrial promotion. Germany committed to providing assistance to further Kenya's initiatives in Haiti and promote peace in the Horn of Africa. Additionally, Ruto had meetings with World Bank President Ajay Banga and French President Emmanuel Macron.
France	Strasbourg	21 November	European Union Parliament Sitting	Details Ruto addressed the European Union Parliament. Climate change and Migration were topics of note.
Tanzania	Arusha	23–24 November	EAC High-Level Forum on Climate Change and Food Security	Details Ruto attended the EAC High-Level Forum on Climate Change and Food Security along with all the heads of state of the East African Community in a closed door session in Arusha. Salva Kiir took over the leadership of the Community and Somalia was added as an 8th member of the union.
United Arab Emirates	Dubai	1–4 December	2023 United Nations Climate Change Conference	Details Ruto attended the 2023 United Nations Climate Change Conference also known as COP28. On the sidelines of the summit, president ruto held talks with: Bjerde Anna, World Bank Managing Director of Operations; Edi Rama, Prime Minister of Albania; Sheik Mohamed bin Zayed Al Nahyan president of the UAE; Vjosa Osmani, President of Kosovo; Ruto was also on a panel to discuss "climate finance" and " accelerated partnership for renewables in Africa".
India	New Delhi	4–6 December	State visit	See also: India–Kenya relations Details Ruto made a state visit to India.

== 2024 ==
The following international trips were made by William Ruto in 2024.

Country	Areas visited	Date(s)	Purpose(s)	Notes
Uganda	Kampala	18–19 January	42nd IGAD Extraordinary Summit & Non-Aligned Movement Summit	Details William Ruto attended the 42nd IGAD Extraordinary Summit. Issues on the Somalia-Ethiopia and the Sudan conflict were discussed. After the IGAD Summit, he joined other Heads of State and Government for the 19th Non-Aligned Movement (NAM) Summit.
Democratic Republic of Congo	Kinshasa	20 January	Swearing in ceremony of Félix Tshisekedi	See also: 2023 Democratic Republic of the Congo general election Details William Ruto attended the swearing in ceremony of Felix Tshisekedi, Ruto attended the event along with former president Uhuru Kenyatta.
Italy	Rome	28–30 January	Italy-Africa Summit 2024	Details William Ruto attended the Italy-Africa Summit.
Japan	Tokyo	6–9 February	State visit	See also: Japan–Kenya relations Details William Ruto made a 3-day state visit to Japan, 20 years after his predecessor Mwai Kibaki made a state visit to Japan in 2004. President William Ruto signed several financial agreements during his visit to Japan, totaling Kenyan Sh350 billion. These agreements spanned various projects and programs. The major projects set to benefit from these agreements include the Dongo Kundu Infrastructure Ecosystem and the Mombasa Gateway Bridge. Additionally, Kenya will issue a KSh40 billion Samurai bond in Japan to finance energy and infrastructure projects, and secure KSh30 billion from the Japan Bank for International Cooperation to purchase heavy machinery and mechanized assets. Furthermore, KSh15 billion will be allocated to the Olkaria Geothermal Development Project, and KSh1 billion will be provided for the production of medical oxygen for various hospitals. The agreements also encompassed humanitarian aid of Kenyan Shilling Sh320 million for those affected by recent El Nino-related floods. President Ruto and Prime Minister Fumio Kushida agreed on the modalities of financing national development and signed a PPP framework between the two governments. The governments also signed an agreement on Defence Cooperation, which makes Kenya the first African country to sign a defence pact with Japan.
United Arab Emirates	Dubai	11–13 February	World Governments Summit 2024	Details William Ruto attended the World Governments Summit. He was invited to deliver a keynote speech where he talked about increased accountability in public spending.
Ethiopia	Addis Ababa	16–18 February	37th ordinary Session of the African Union (AU) Assembly	Details William Ruto attended the leaders summit at the African Union. During the event, William Ruto was notably active in several key engagements: Spoke at the High-Level Event on Climate Finance for Agriculture and Food Security.; Chaired the Committee of African Heads of State and Government on Climate Change.; Co-hosted a meeting on vaccine manufacturing in Africa with the International Vaccine Institute.; Attended the Presidential Dialogue on Global Financial Institutions Reform.; On the side lines of the Summit, he also: Engaged in talks with President Luiz Inácio Lula da Silva of Brazil, the current G20 Chair.; Met President Cyril Ramaphosa of South Africa. On Sunday, February 18, William Ruto along with Samia Suluhu and other regional leaders were present during the unveiling of a new statue of the former Tanzanian President the Late Julius Nyerere at the African Union.
Namibia	Windhoek	24 February	Funeral of President Hage Geingob	Details William Ruto attended the funeral service and burial ceremony of Late Namibian President Hage Geingob along with various other regional leaders.
Uganda	Kisozi	26 February	Official meeting	Details William Ruto had a meeting with Ugandan President Yoweri Museveni at his country home in Kisozi, Uganda. Raila Odinga along with delegation also attended the meeting. The meeting primarily focused on issues pertaining to energy and petroleum.
Tanzania	Zanzibar	14 March	Official meeting	Details William Ruto had a meeting with Ugandan President Yoweri Museveni and President Samia Suluhu Hassan of Tanzania in Zanzibar to discuss East African Community agenda items.
Ghana	Accra	2–4 April	State visit	See also: Ghana–Kenya relations Details William Ruto made a three date state visit to Ghana where he was received by his counterpart, Ghanaian President Nana Akufo-Addo. Both leaders discussed bilateral relations between the two countries and signed several MoUs. Ruto asked for Ghana's support for Raila Odinga's bid for the chairmanship of the African Union Commission. President Ruto was also awarded Ghana's highest honour, The Companion of the Order of the Star of the Volta.
Guinea-Bissau	Bissau	4–5 April	State visit	Details William Ruto made a state visit to Guinea-Bissau where he was received by his counterpart President Umaro Sissoco Embaló. This marked the first state visit by the Kenyan head of state to the country. Both leaders held bilateral talks and Ruto was also awarded the highest medal in Guinea-Bissau the Amílcar Cabral Medal. President Ruto pledged to initiate direct flights between the two countries.
Equatorial Guinea	Malabo	6 April	Official visit	Details William Ruto made a 10-hour stop over in Malabo after his return from his state visit in Guinea-Bissau. He was received by Vice President Teodoro Nguema Obiang Mangue at the presidential palace. Both leaders held bilateral talks and the president requested Equatorial Guinea's support for Raila Odinga's bid for the chairmanship of the African Union Commission.
Central African Republic	Bangui	6 April	Official visit	Details William Ruto made a stop over from his return trip from West Africa. He was received by his CAR counterpart President Faustin-Archange Touadéra. It was the first time a Kenyan head of state had visited the country. Both leaders held talks and Ruto requested Central African Republic's support for Raila Odinga's bid for the chairmanship of the African Union Commission.
Tanzania	Dar es Salaam	25–26 April	Tanzania Union Day celebrations	Details Ruto attended the 60th anniversary of the Union between Tanganyika and Zanzibar. He held bilateral talks with president Samia Suluhu Hassan on the sidelines.
Zimbabwe	Bulawayo	27–28 April	State visit	See also: Kenya–Zimbabwe relations Details William Ruto made a two-day state visit to Zimbabwe. President Ruto held bilateral talks with his counterpart Emmerson Mnangagwa at the state house in Bulawayo. Both leaders attended the 64th Zimbabwe International Trade Fair (ZITF), where Ruto, the guest of honor, officially opened the trade fair. Ruto also got the support of Zimbabwe for Raila Odinga's 2025 AU Chairmanship bid.
Rwanda	Kigali	17–18 May	Africa CEO Forum	Details Ruto attended the Africa CEO Forum hosted by Jeune Afrique Media Group in partnership with the International Finance Corporation, part of the World Bank Group. On the sidelines of the summit, President Ruto held bilateral talks with Rwandese President Paul Kagame. He also met with other business leaders such as Arab Bank Development in Africa Director-General Sidi Ould Tah; International Financial Corporation Managing Director Makhtar Diop; and MTN Chairperson Mcebisi Jonas.
United States	Atlanta, Washington D.C.	21–24 May	State visit	See also: Kenya–United States relations Details William Ruto made a three-day state visit to the United States. This was his first state visit as head of state of Kenya. The visit had a very tight schedule and included the following: On May 21 the visit began with Ruto going arriving in Atlanta. The first stop, the president visited The Jimmy Carter Library and Museum where he attended talks on Global Democracy. After this, Ruto went to the Centers for Disease Control and Prevention, at the Centre for Disease Control Headquarters, President Ruto observed the signing of Memoranda of Understanding (MoUs) between the CDC and the Kenya Medical Research Institute, the Ministry of Health, and the U.S. President's Emergency Plan for AIDS Relief. These agreements aim to develop a Roadmap for Kenya's HIV Programme and formalize the Kenya National Public Health Institute. Later, Ruto visited Spelman college where he gave a speech and signed a STEM agreement. President Ruto visited Coca-Cola's headquarters and signed a framework agreement focused on policy engagement, mango juice production, and plastic recycling. This celebrated 70 years of Coca-Cola's operations in Kenya.; On May 22, Ruto arrived in Washington D.C.In the morning President Ruto addressed the Congressional Black Caucus at the US Senate. Following this, the President also meets various other senate leaders before heading to the White House to meet with President Joe Biden. After the meeting, President Ruto visiting the Arlington Memorial Park.; On May 23, President Ruto returned to the White House where the State Arrival Ceremony was conducted. The two leaders discussed new agreements in Science, Trade and Financing. Also at the press conference, Biden mentioned that Kenya was going to be designated as a major non-NATO ally. After the meeting, the President gave a speech on Shared Climate Solutions at the Johns Hopkins Bloomberg School of Public Health.
South Korea	Goyang, Seoul	3–5 June	Africa–Korea Summit	See also: Kenya–South Korea relations Details William Ruto attended the inaugural Korea-Africa Summit hosted by Yoon Suk Yeol. On the sidelines of the summit, the president held bilateral talks with Yeol. Korea agreed on a release of $485 million concessional development funding, including $238 million for the Konza Digital Media City Project. On the sidelines of the summit, Ruto held talks with: President of the Korea Exim Bank Yoon Hi-sang; Former Secretary-General of the United Nations, Ban Ki-moon; Along with meeting several members of the Korean business community, the president addressed the High Level Business Segment on Climate Change Response and Transition To Carbon-Free Energy. President Ruto was a guest at the accession ceremony of Kenya joining the International Vaccine Institute.
Italy	Apulia	14–15 June	50th G7 summit	Details Ruto attended the 50th G7 summit as a guest in Apulia, Italy. On the sidelines of the summit, president Ruto held bilateral talks with: Algerian President Abdelmadjid Tebboune, and secured their commitment to Kenya's bid for the African Union Chairmanship.; Pope Francis, where they discussed the end of violence in Sudan and DRC.; French President Emmanuel Macron, where they discussed several infrastructure projects including railway development and energy; as well as Kenya's mission to Haiti.
Switzerland	Bürgenstock	15–16 June	Summit on Peace in Ukraine	Details Ruto attended the Summit on Peace in Ukraine along with various world leaders. President Ruto held bilateral talks with Ukrainian president Volodymyr Zelenskyy on the sidelines of the peace summit.
Rwanda	Kigali	11 August	Inauguration of Paul Kagame	See also: 2024 Rwandan general election Details Ruto attended the Inauguration of the reelection of President Paul Kagame along with other regional heads of state.
China	Beijing	2–6 September	Forum on China–Africa Cooperation 2024	Details William Ruto along with various African Heads of State attended the Forum on China-Africa Cooperation hosted in China by President Xi Jinping. Ahead of the forum President Ruto held bilateral talks with Xi Jinping. On the sidelines of the summit, Ruto held bilateral talks with several leaders such as: Denis Sassou Nguesso, president of the Republic of Congo; Paul Kagame, president of Rwanda; Umaro Sissoco Embaló, president of Guinea-Bissau; Mahamat Déby, president of Chad; Hakainde Hichilema, president of Zambia; Hassan Sheikh Mohamud, president of Somalia; President, Ruto also participates in the signing of Kenya being added as a full member of the Asian Infrastructure Investment Bank.
Germany	Berlin	13–15 September	Official visit	See also: Germany–Kenya relations Details William Ruto made a two-day official visit to Germany. President Ruto signed a labor mobility and migration agreement with Germany during his two-day visit. The agreement also included provisions for enhanced educational and vocational opportunities for Kenyans in Germany. Additionally, Ruto promoted Kenya as an investment destination and met with the diaspora living in Germany. Kenya was also honored at Berlin's citizens' festival.
Haiti	Port-au-Prince	22 September	Official visit	See also: Multinational Security Support Mission in Haiti Details Ruto visited the Kenyan police forces stationed in Haiti to assess the situation. He pledged to send additional forces to Haiti to bolster the mission. Ruto also announced that he supported turning the current Kenya-led security mission into a full United Nations peacekeeping operation.
South Sudan	Juba	6 November	Official visit	See also: Tumaini Peace Initiative Details Ruto visited Juba for an important meeting with South Sudan president Salva Kiir to continue discussions under the Tumaini Peace Initiative. This Kenyan-led peace process, introduced in May 2024, seeks to address South Sudan's long-standing political divisions. Additionally, the leaders talked about key regional infrastructure projects, such as the LAPSSET Corridor.
Ethiopia	Addis Ababa	7 November	5th Mid-Year Coordination Meeting of the African Union	Details Ruto attended the AU Summit.
Tanzania	Arusha	29–30 November	24th Ordinary Summit of East Africa Community of Heads of State	Details Ruto attended the East Africa Community Heads of State Summit held in Arusha. The summit marked the 25th anniversary of the East African Community Union.

== 2025 ==
The following international trips were made by William Ruto in 2025.

Country	Areas visited	Date(s)	Purpose(s)	Notes
Ghana	Accra	7 January	Inauguration of John Mahama	See also: 2024 Ghanaian general election Details Ruto attended the inauguration of Ghana's new president John Mahama.
Angola	Luanda	8 January	Official visit	See also: Angola–Kenya relations Details On the way back from Ghana, Ruto made a quick stop in Angola. President William Ruto of Kenya and President João Lourenço of Angola agreed to several key points: restarting Kenya Airways' direct flights to Luanda by March, Angola working towards waiving visa requirements for Kenyan travelers in reciprocity for Kenya's earlier decision to lift visa restrictions for Angolans, and collaboration on institutional reforms at the African Union (AU). Ruto also seeks Lourenço's backing for Raila Odinga's candidacy for the AUC chairmanship and invited Lourenço for a retreat in Kenya later this year to further discuss this. Both leaders acknowledged the importance of a joint meeting between SADC and EAC to consolidate peace efforts in eastern DR Congo. This was the first official visit to Angola after Ruto assumed presidency.
Uganda	Kampala	11 January	Comprehensive Africa Agriculture Development Programme (CAADP) Summit	Details Ruto along regional leaders attended the African Union Extraordinary Summit on Comprehensive Africa Agriculture Development Programme in Kampala, Uganda.
United Arab Emirates	Abu Dhabi	14 January	Official visit	See also: Kenya–United Arab Emirates relations Details Ruto made a trip to Abu Dhabi where he met with Emirati ruler Sheikh Mohamed bin Zayed Al Nahyan, where the two leaders witnessed a financing agreement between the two countries. Kenya is pivoting to the United Arab Emirates for funding to extend its Standard Gauge Railway (SGR) project after China withdrew financial support in 2019. The financing is to help extend the railway which currently ends in the Rift Valley, to connect Kenya, Uganda, and South Sudan.
Tanzania	Dar es Salaam	28 January	300 Africa Energy Summit	Details William Ruto joined at least 15 other African heads of state and government in Dar es Salaam, Tanzania, for the Mission 300 Africa Energy Summit. The summit, co-hosted by the Tanzanian government, the African Union, the African Development Bank Group, and the World Bank Group, aimed to accelerate energy access across Africa, with a goal of providing electricity to 300 million people by 2030.
Egypt	Cairo	29–30 January	State visit	See also: Egypt–Kenya relations Details President William Ruto arrived in Cairo for a two-day state visit after attending the Mission 300 for Africa Energy Summit in Tanzania. He was received by Egyptian President Abdel-Fattah El-Sisi. The two countries signed 12 strategic MOUs to enhance cooperation and foster mutual growth. Notably, Egypt is Kenya's second-largest tea importer after Pakistan. Ruto also met with the Kenyan Diaspora in Cairo at an evening event. He also held talks with executives of ElSewedy Electric and Orascom Construction.
Tanzania	Dar es Salaam	8 February	Joint SADC-EAC Summit on DRC Crisis	Details Ruto attended the Joint SADC-EAC Summit on DRC Crisis as the chairperson of the East African Community between heads of state in Dar es salaam.
Ethiopia	Addis Ababa	13–16 February	38th African Union Summit	Details Ruto represented the Kenyan Delegration to the 38th African Union Summit. Ruto traveled to Addis Ababa with Raila Odinga, who was contesting the African Union Chairperson election. Raila lost the election to Mahamoud Ali Youssouf. On the sidelines of the summit, Ruto held bilateral talks with: Mia Mottley, President of Barbados; Moussa Faki, Chairperson of the African Union; Abiy Ahmed, Prime Minister of Ethiopia; Bassirou Diomaye Faye, President of Senegal; António Guterres, Secretary-General of the United Nations; Benedict Oramah, Afreximbank President; Teodoro Obiang Nguema Mbasogo, President of Equatorial Guinea; João Lourenço, President of Angola
Namibia	Windhoek	21 March	Inauguration of Netumbo Nandi-Ndaitwah	See also: 2024 Namibian general election Details President William Ruto attended to inauguration ceremony of Namibia's first female president Netumbo Nandi-Ndaitwah.
China	Beijing, Fuzhou, Ningde	22–26 April	State Visit	See also: China–Kenya relations Details President William Ruto arrived in Beijing for a four-day state visit. alongside President Xi Jinping. The two discussed bilateral relations to a “China–Kenya community with a shared future for the new era” and signed approximately 20 agreements spanning science and technology, vocational education, infrastructure, e-commerce, intelligent transport, and railway development. He also toured green energy facilities, expressing Kenya’s commitment to achieving a 100 percent renewable energy grid by 2030 and exploring partnerships for electric vehicle battery manufacturing and technology transfer. After that, he made a stop to Fujian Province. In Fuzhou, Ruto met with Secretary Zhou Zuyi. He also toured the “Vision 3820” Development Strategy Exhibition and the FCIC Science and Innovation Industrial Base, before moving on to Ningde where he visited the CATL headquarters and a poverty alleviation exhibition, commending China’s model of poverty reduction and innovation-driven development.
Vatican City	Vatican City	26–27 April	Funeral of Pope Francis	Details President William Ruto attended the funeral of Pope Francis at St. Peter’s Square in the Vatican, joining heads of state and other global leaders, including U.S. President Donald Trump, in paying tribute to the late pontiff.
Spain	Seville	29 June –1 July	4th International Conference on Financing for Development	Details President William Ruto traveled to Seville, Spain, to attend the Fourth International Conference on Financing for Development, where he co-chaired a high-level session and advocated for reforms to international financial systems, including fairer debt structures and inclusive multilateralism. During his stay, he held bilateral meetings with Spanish Prime Minister Pedro Sánchez, King Felipe VI, and other leaders, focusing on enhancing cooperation in areas such as clean energy, youth empowerment, climate resilience, and global financial reform.
United Kingdom	London	1–3 July	Official Visit	See also: Kenya–United Kingdom relations Details President William Ruto visited London in where he and UK Prime Minister Sir Keir Starmer signed a renewed Kenya–UK Strategic Partnership for 2025–2030. During the visit, Ruto also witnessed the establishment of a Lloyd’s underwriting hub under the Nairobi International Financial Centre, and promoted a new National Policy on Labour Migration at a Diaspora Town Hall in London to formalize overseas employment while encouraging proper documentation for migrant workers.
Ethiopia	Addis Ababa	27–28 July	2nd UN Food Systems Summit Stocktake	Details President William Ruto led Kenya’s delegation to the Second UN Food Systems Summit Stocktake (UNFSS+4) in Addis Ababa, Ethiopia. On the sidelines, he held bilateral talks with several leaders, including the prime ministers of Ethiopia and Italy, as well as heads of international organizations such as IFAD and FAO.
Japan	Yokohama	18–22 August	9th Tokyo International Conference on African Development	Details President William Ruto travelled to Tokyo on August 18, 2025, to attend the 9th Tokyo International Conference on African Development (TICAD 9). During the summit, he delivered a keynote address on August 22 in which he emphasized the need for stronger efforts to stimulate African economies through job creation, poverty reduction, and expanded access to health and education. Beyond the official sessions, Ruto also held meetings with executives from leading Japanese corporations and financial institutions, securing commitments aimed at boosting investment in Kenya.
Ethiopia	Addis Ababa	7–9 September	2nd Africa–CARICOM Summit and Africa Climate Summit 2	Details Ruto made a three day trip to Ethiopia.: Day 1: Ruto attended the 2nd Africa CARICOM Summit held in Adidas Ababa. Ruto held bilateral talks with several Caribbean Nation members on the sidelines of the summit.; Day 2: Ruto attended the 2nd Africa Climate Summit (ACS2), under the theme “Nature-Based Solutions for Africa’s Resilience.; Day 3: Ruto attended the inauguration ceremony of Ethiopia's Grand Ethiopian Renaissance Dam.
United States	New York City	21–29 September	Eightieth session of the United Nations General Assembly	Details William Ruto traveled to the United States for the High-Level Week of the 80th session of the United Nations General Assembly.
Angola	Luanda	24–26 November	State visit	See also: Angola–Kenya relations Details William Ruto made an official state visit to Angola to discuss bilateral relations and regional cooperation.
United States	Washington, D.C.	2–3 December	High-level peace summit on Eastern DRC	Details William Ruto visited Washington, D.C. to participate in a high-level peace summit, joining leaders including President Paul Kagame and President Félix Tshisekedi to sign an agreement aimed at resolving the conflict in the Eastern DRC.
Ethiopia	Addis Ababa	23 December	Working visit	Details William Ruto held a one-day working visit with Prime Minister Abiy Ahmed.

== 2026 ==
The following international trips were made by William Ruto in 2026.

Country	Areas visited	Date(s)	Purpose(s)	Notes
Italy	Rome	14–16 April	State visit	See also: Italy–Kenya relations Details President William Ruto made a state visit to Italy where he held bilateral talks with Prime Minister Giorgia Meloni and President Sergio Mattarella. The leaders discussed strengthening trade, investment, security cooperation and other areas of bilateral relations.
Belgium	Brussels	2–3 June	State visit	Details President William Ruto visited Belgium as part of a European tour. He met King Philippe and held talks focused on trade, investment, and strengthening bilateral relations.
Norway	Oslo	4 June	Official visit	Details President William Ruto visited Norway during his European tour.
Finland	Helsinki, Espoo, Turku, Naantali	5–6 June	State visit	Details President William Ruto held talks with Finnish President Alexander Stubb during his state visit to Finland.
France	Évian-les-Bains	15–17 June	52nd G7 summit	Details Ruto attended the 52nd G7 summit as an invited leader, representing Africa's development priorities.
Madagascar	Antananarivo	25–27 June	State visit and Independence Day celebrations	Details President William Ruto arrived in Madagascar for the country’s Independence Day celebrations and held bilateral talks.
United States	New York	19–24 September	Eighty-first session of the United Nations General Assembly	See also: Kenya–United States relations Details President William Ruto travelled to New York to attend the 81st United Nations General Assembly. He addressed the General Debate on 23 September, calling for reform of the United Nations Security Council and the international financial system. On the sidelines he met businessman Aliko Dangote and Africa Finance Corporation chief executive Samaila Zubairu to discuss financing for a planned refinery in Lamu.
Nigeria	Lagos	25 September	Working visit	See also: Kenya–Nigeria relations Details President William Ruto, accompanied by First Lady Rachel Ruto, toured the Dangote Petroleum Refinery in Lekki, where he was hosted by Aliko Dangote. The visit came ahead of the groundbreaking of the proposed East Africa Refinery in Lamu, Kenya, planned for 30 September.
Russia	Moscow	28–29 October	Third Russia–Africa Summit	See also: Kenya–Russia relations Details President William Ruto attended the third Russia–Africa Summit and the accompanying Economic and Humanitarian Forum. This was his first visit to Russia as president. In his address to the summit on 29 October, he urged Russia to invest in African industry, technology transfer and local fertiliser production. He also held talks with President Vladimir Putin on the sidelines, where he proposed producing fertilisers in Kenya with the participation of Russian companies.

== See also ==
- List of international presidential trips made by Uhuru Kenyatta, his predecessor
