= List of Jews from Sub-Saharan Africa =

This is a list of Jews from Sub-Saharan Africa. It is arranged by country of origin. The vast majority of African Jews inhabiting areas below the Sahara live in South Africa, and are mainly of Ashkenazi (largely Lithuanian) origin. A number of Beta Israel also reside in Ethiopia. Additionally, small post-colonial communities exist elsewhere.

== Cameroon ==
- Yaphet Kotto, actor (Cameroonian father)

== DR Congo ==
- Léon Kengo wa Dondo, Prime Minister of Zaire (Polish-Jewish father)
- Moïse Katumbi, businessman and politician (Greek-Jewish father)
- Olivier Strelli, fashion designer

== Ethiopia and Eritrea ==
- Ephraim Isaac, Phd Princeton Scholar
- Adisu Massala, politician
- Esti Mamo, Ethiopian-Israeli model
- Meskie Shibru-Sivan, actress and singer

== Kenya ==
- Israel Somen, businessman and diplomat
- Jonathan Somen, entrepreneur
- Erica Mann, architect, town planner, NGO leader, women's cooperatives developer
- Igor Mann, veterinarian, senior civil service professional

== Mozambique ==
- Albie Sachs, ANC activist (lived in Mozambique during exile from South Africa)
- Ruth First, ANC activist (lived in Mozambique during exile from South Africa)

== Namibia ==
- Harold Pupkewitz, entrepreneur ( Lithuanian born)

== South Africa ==
=== Politicians and activists ===
- Morris Alexander (1877–1946), pre-apartheid MP
- Hilda Bernstein, anti-apartheid activist
- Lionel Bernstein, anti-apartheid activist
- Harry Bloom, anti-apartheid activist
- Jules Browde, barrister, jurist and anti-apartheid activist. Law school classmate of Nelson Mandela.
- Arthur Chaskalson, chief justice
- Abba Eban, Israeli diplomat (South African-born)
- Andrew Feinstein, former ANC MP, author & anti-arms trade activist
- Bram Fischer, anti-apartheid activist
- Bernard Friedman, anti-apartheid MP
- Richard Goldstone, judge and international war crimes prosecutor
- Joel Joffe, human rights activist
- Ronnie Kasrils, former South African Intelligence Minister
- Tony Leon, former opposition leader
- Joe Slovo, ANC activist and leader of the South African Communist Party
- Harry Schwarz, anti-apartheid politician, lawyer and diplomat
- Helen Suzman, anti-apartheid MP
- Harold Hanson, QC and strong supporter of civil liberties

Other Jewish ANC activists included Ruth First, Albie Sachs and five of the six whites arrested in the Rivonia Trial: Denis Goldberg, Lionel Bernstein, Arthur Goldreich, James Kantor, Harold Wolpe and Gaby Shapiro.

=== Academics ===
- Abraham Manie Adelstein, UK Chief Medical Statistician
- Selig Percy Amoils, Inventor & Surgeon
- Moses Blackman, crystallographer
- Sydney Brenner, biologist, Nobel Prize (2002)
- Leo Camron, educationalist
- Sydney Cohen, pathologist (Jewish Year Book, 2005, p214, 230)
- Meyer Fortes, anthropologist
- Max Gluckman, anthropologist
- Frank Herbstein, crystallographer, 1926-2011
- Aaron Klug, chemist, Nobel Prize (1982)
- Ludwig Lachmann, economist
- Arnold Lazarus, psychologist
- Roland Levinsky, biologist
- Stanley Mandelstam, physicist (Jewish Year Book 2005 p214)
- Shula Marks, historian (Jewish Year Book 2005 p215)
- Frank Nabarro, physicist (Jewish Year Book 2005 p214)
- Seymour Papert, Artificial Intelligence pioneer
- Peter Sarnak, mathematician
- Isaac Schapera, anthropologist (Jewish Year Book 2005 p215)
- Anthony Segal, biochemist (Jewish Year Book 2005 p214)
- Joseph Sonnabend, HIV/AIDS researcher
- Phillip V. Tobias, palaeoanthropologist
- Joseph Wolpe, psychotherapist
- Lewis Wolpert, developmental biologist
- Basil Yamey, economist (Jewish Year Book 2005 p215,315)
- Solly Zuckerman, UK zoologist
- Max Price, Vice-Chancellor of the University of Cape Town

=== Cultural figures ===
- Lionel Abrahams, poet
- Jillian Becker, writer
- Dani Behr, TV presenter
- Harry Bloom, writer and lecturer
- Johnny Clegg, World Beat musician
- John Cranko, choreographer
- Adam Friedland, comedian and podcaster
- Graeme Friedman, writer
- David Goldblatt, photographer
- Nadine Gordimer, writer, Nobel Prize (1991)
- Laurence Harvey, actor
- Ronald Harwood, playwright
- Manu Herbstein, writer
- Dan Jacobson, writer
- Sid James, comic actor
- Danny K, pop singer
- William Kentridge, artist
- Lennie Lee, artist
- Manfred Mann (Manfred Lubowitz), R&B keyboardist
- Sarah Millin, writer
- Trevor Rabin, guitarist & film composer
- Jonathan Shapiro (Zapiro), political cartoonist
- Antony Sher, stage actor
- Janet Suzman, stage actress

=== Business and professional figures ===
- Raymond Ackerman, supermarket tycoon
- Alfred Beit, diamond magnate
- Donald Gordon, founder of insurance company Liberty Life, shopping centre owner & philanthropist
- Sydney Jacobson, newspaper editor
- Solomon Joel, financier
- Sol Kerzner, hotel & casino owner
- Sammy Marks, early entrepreneur from Pretoria
- Ernest & Harry Oppenheimer, diamond tycoons & philanthropists (Harry converted to Christianity)
- Percy Yutar, South Africa's first Jewish attorney general and prosecutor of Nelson Mandela in the 1963 Rivonia Treason Trial.
- Walter Matulis JR. Co owner of a driver training business. Walter was raised as Roman Catholic only to find out in the 6th decade of his life that his ancestors were Lithuanian Jews. Walter remains a Christian while identifying himself as being of Jewish blood.

=== Sports figures ===
- Ali & Adam Bacher, cricketers
- Leo Camron, rugby union player and cricketer.
- Okey Geffin, rugby union player
- Harry Isaacs, Olympic boxing medalist
- Ilana Kloss, tennis player
- Sarah Poewe, swimmer
- Philip Rabinowitz (runner), 100-year-old sprinter
- Jeremy Reingold, World Champion Swimmer, Rugby Player
- Jody Scheckter, Formula 1 driver
- Shaun Tomson, surfer
- Mandy Yachad, cricketer

==== Rugby union ====
- Max Baise, South African rugby union referee.
- Louis Babrow
- Leo Camron, South African who helped introduce rugby to Israel., also a cricketer
- Okey Geffin, South African Rugby Union player
- Joe Kaminer
- Jonathan Kaplan, South African who holds the world record for refereeing the highest number of international rugby union test matches.
- Alan Menter, South African Rugby Union Player
- Cecil Moss, South African rugby union player and coach
- Sydney Nomis, South African Rugby Union player
- Wilf Rosenberg, rugby union player
- Fred Smollan
- Joel Stransky, South African rugby union player

== Uganda ==
- Gershom Sizomu, rabbi and Member of Parliament

== Zambia ==
- Denise Scott Brown, architect
- Stanley Fischer, IMF economist

== Zimbabwe ==
- Norman Geras, professor of Government
- Anthony Gubbay, former chief justice
- Laurence Levy, pioneering neurosurgeon
- Alexander Pines, chemist
- Roy Welensky, prime minister of the Federation of Rhodesia and Nyasaland

== See also ==
- African Jews
- List of Jews
- List of African-American Jews
- List of South Africans
- Category:Black Jewish people
