= Nairobi Hebrew Congregation =

Coordinates: 1°16′52″S 36°48′56″E

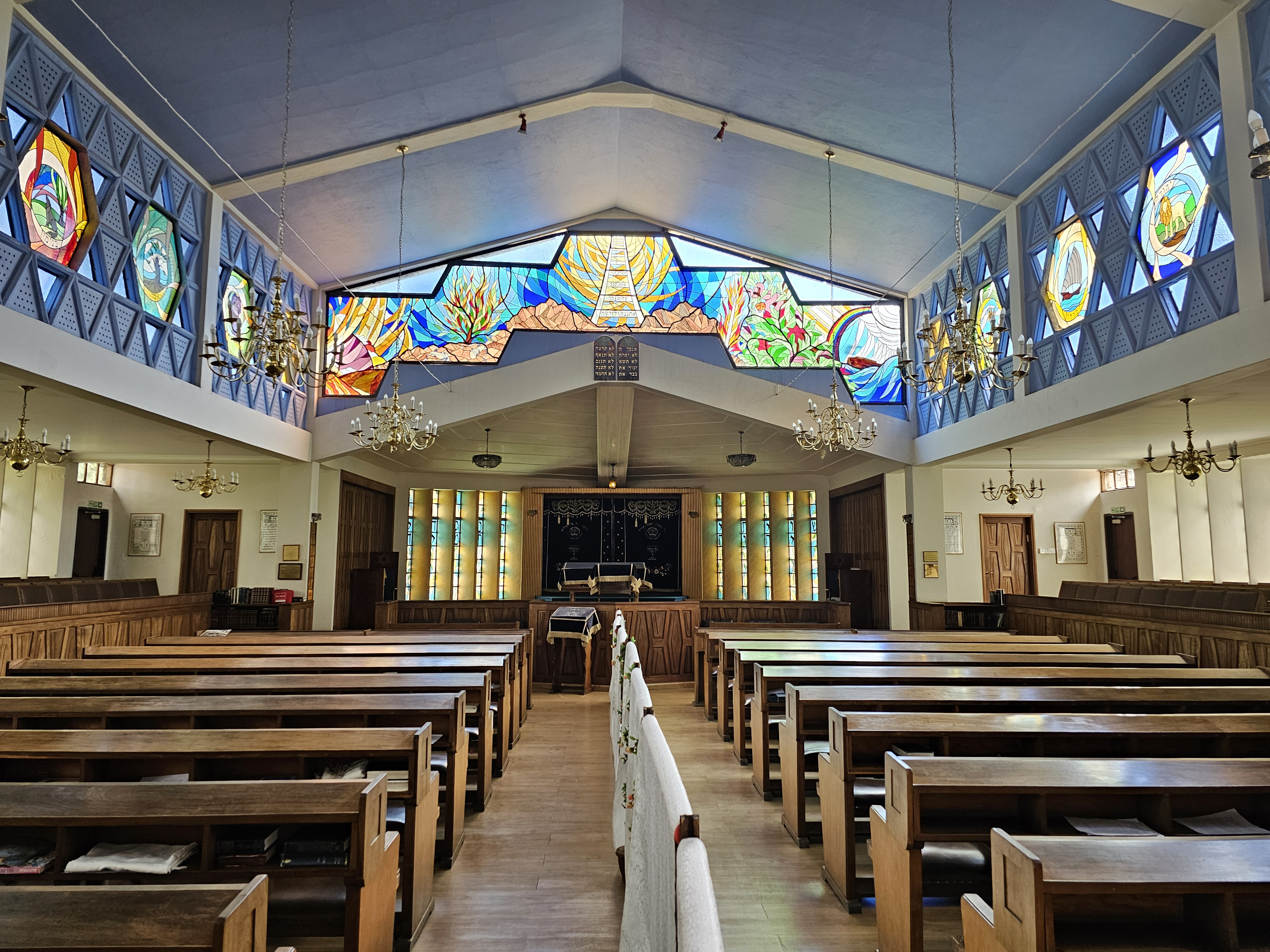
Inside view of the Nairobi Hebrew Congregation

The Nairobi Hebrew Congregation is a synagogue founded in 1912 by Jewish merchants residing in Nairobi, which was part of the British East Africa. The Nairobi Jewish community has existed since 1904, when a few families migrated to East Africa following the Uganda Scheme, the plan proposed by Joseph Chamberlain, which offered the Jews a refuge from the pogroms in the Russian Empire by the Mau Escarpment, and took its current name in 1907. It was the first synagogue in eastern Africa.

The original building was inaugurated in 1912, and it was demolished in 1954 to make room for a larger building, which was designed by Imre Rozsa and inaugurated the next year.

Approximately 20 native Kenyans who converted to Judaism are part of the community. The community is officially Orthodox and has around 600 members. The synagogue is affiliated to the World Jewish Congress.

== See also ==
- History of Jews in Kenya
- Israel Somen
- Kenya-Israel relations
