= Ebony Rainford-Brent =

English cricketer (born 1983)

Ebony Rainford-Brent MBE
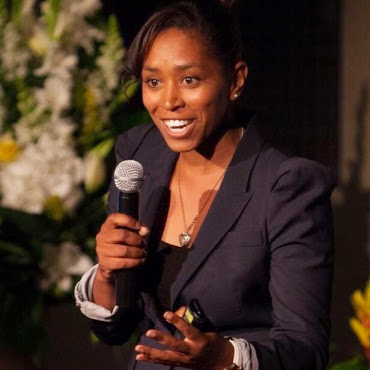

Personal information
- Full name: Ebony-Jewel Cora-Lee Rosamond Camellia Rainford-Brent
- Born: 31 December 1983 (age 42); Lambeth, Greater London, England
- Batting: Right-handed
- Bowling: Right-arm fast-medium
- Role: Batter

International information
- National side: England (2001–2010)
- ODI debut (cap 98): 11 August 2001 v Netherlands
- Last ODI: 1 March 2010 v India
- T20I debut (cap 21): 22 August 2008 v South Africa
- Last T20I: 4 March 2010 v India

Domestic team information
- Years: Team
- 2001–2012: Surrey

Career statistics
Competition	WODI	WT20I	WLA	WT20
Matches	22	7	114	25
Runs scored	377	53	2,450	484
Batting average	23.56	8.83	24.50	30.25
100s/50s	0/2	0/0	3/12	0/2
Top score	72	23*	154*	80*
Balls bowled	96	–	747	42
Wickets	2	–	11	2
Bowling average	45.00	–	51.09	18.00
5 wickets in innings	0	–	0	0
10 wickets in match	0	–	0	0
Best bowling	1/8	–	3/22	1/7
Catches/stumpings	4/–	0/–	28/–	11/–
- Source: CricketArchive, 6 March 2021

Ebony-Jewel Cora-Lee Camellia Rosamond Rainford-Brent MBE (born 31 December 1983) is an English former cricketer who is now a commentator, Chair of the African-Caribbean Engagement (ACE) programme, and Non-Executive Director at The England and Wales Cricket Board (ECB). She was the first black woman to play for England. She was also captain of the Surrey Women's team and first Director of Women’s Cricket at Surrey County Cricket Club.

Rainford-Brent was a member of the England team that won the 2009 Women's Cricket World Cup in Australia. England beat New Zealand by 4 wickets in the final held at North Sydney Oval on 22 March 2009. In the three months following their World Cup win, the team went on to win the final of the 2009 Women's World Twenty20 (again beating New Zealand in the final), win the NatWest One Day series 4–0 against Australia, and retain the Women's Ashes.

After retiring from cricket, Rainford-Brent has gone on to become a sporting executive, a pundit for the BBC's flagship radio programme Test Match Special (she is one of the first female expert summarisers to commentate on men's international cricket matches), and a motivational speaker. In January 2015, Rainford-Brent returned to Surrey after being appointed their first Director of Women's Cricket. In 2017, Rainford-Brent hosted a podcast, The Art of Success. In 2020, she became a part of the Sky Sports cricket commentary team.

== Early life ==
Born to an African-American father and Jamaican mother on New Year's Eve in 1983 at St Thomas' Hospital, Lambeth, Greater London, Rainford-Brent was brought up in Herne Hill, southeast London. She was the youngest of four children; being the only girl, she was named after all her grandmothers and great-grandmothers, which led to her being called Ebony-Jewel Cora-Lee Camellia Rosamond Rainford-Brent to appease everyone.

Her older brother, Keith Headley (known as Jay), was fatally stabbed over a feud in the street in 1989 when she was 5.

Her introduction to cricket came through the charity Cricket for Change, which visited her primary school when she was aged nine. She later attended the Grey Coat Hospital school in Westminster. She showed considerable sporting prowess; successful at many sports including football and basketball, and represented London at the English Schools' Athletics Championships in several disciplines, but she decided to focus on cricket.

However, her promising cricket career was interrupted by a serious back injury. At age 19, she was diagnosed with two prolapsed discs and a pars defect. Her injuries forced her to take a year out from her studies at University College London (UCL), and NHS doctors advised her to give up playing any form of sport.

After taking advice and support from her elder brother, Dominic Headley, she sought alternative opinions and treatment from numerous specialists. Eventually, the Talented Athletes Scholarship Scheme (TASS) programme made contact with her; they provided the necessary treatment and support to aid her recovery. Just under three years later, she recovered enough to represent her country at the 2007 World series in Chennai, India. She was named UCL Sportswoman of the Year in March 2007, and successfully completed her studies, graduating with a Masters in Chemistry.

== Cricket career ==
Rainford-Brent played for Surrey throughout her playing career, from the under-11s to the senior team. She was captain of the Surrey Women's cricket team, which in 2011 gained promotion to the top flight of domestic women's cricket – the LV County Championship Division One.

As well as being a member of the England Women's World Cup-winning team, her international playing career highlights include, winning Player of the Match against the West Indies in 2009, with a career best 72 not out.

She was the first woman cricketer to score three consecutive ducks in WT20I history.

She is a fully qualified cricket coach, tutor trainer and a Master Practitioner of neuro-linguistic programming (NLP).

== Media work ==
Rainford-Brent has carried out numerous media engagements over the years. In addition to being a match host for Surrey County Cricket men's games, she has appeared as a guest presenter on BBC Newsround; also as an occasional expert and pundit on Sky Sports and BBC Breakfast. She has written numerous blogs and articles for BBC Sport, Cricket World and others. In 2012, she began to appear on BBC radio's Test Match Special (TMS). Initially summarising women's games, she later also contributed to domestic men's matches and has since appeared as a TMS summariser for several men's international matches. In November 2014, it was announced that Rainford-Brent would be going to the men's 2015 Cricket World Cup as one of the team of expert summarisers for TMS.

In October 2016 she worked for the TMS team in both the first and second Tests (of a two-match series) between Bangladesh and England, in Chittagong and Dhaka. In 2020 she joined the Sky Sports cricket commentary team, and was added as a TMS summariser for the Third Test between England and Pakistan from 21 August 2020. She and Michael Holding were awarded Freedom of the City of London in December 2020 for their efforts in standing up against racism during coverage of the first Test between England and West Indies in 2020. They were also part of the Sky Sports Team that won the BAFTA award in the Sports Category in June 2021. She was also named a winner alongside Marcus Rashford of the Sports Journalists’ Association's (SJA) Sport for Social Change awards in November 2020.

In December 2024 Rainford-Brent was the castaway on the BBC Radio 4 programme Desert Island Discs.

== Cricket executive ==
During her playing career, Rainford-Brent was appointed as one of the first ever Chance to Shine Coaching ambassadors: delivering cricket and motivational talks to state schools and clubs throughout England and Wales.

In 2011 Rainford-Brent began work as a cricket executive for the charity Lord's Taverners. She eventually became Cricket programmes manager for the charity, developing national programmes to support disadvantaged and disabled young people to access sport.

In 2013 she was appointed as a Trustee of the England and Wales Cricket Board Trust (EWCT).

In 2014 Rainford-Brent was appointed as the first Director for Surrey Women's Cricket. The role involves working with Academy Director, Gareth Townsend, and the Performance Department advising on all Women's cricket played at the club. She also works with the Surrey Cricket Board on the development of the Women's game and strategies to increase participation at all levels. In this role, she was involved in the organisation of a women's Twenty20 match between Surrey and Middlesex in May 2015. Rainford-Brent, in discussing the event, suggested that the game would be the inaugural match in what was intended to become an annual tournament.

In January 2020 she launched Surrey's African-Caribbean Engagement (ACE) programme, aimed at encouraging black teenagers into cricket. By January 2023 it had reached 10,000 children with 141 academy scholars training twice a week.

She was appointed Member of the Order of the British Empire (MBE) in the 2021 Birthday Honours for services to cricket and charity.

In 2023 Rainford-Brent was appointed to the ECB Board as a Cricket Non-executive Director. Also in 2023, she was awarded an honorary degree by Loughborough University in recognition of her contribution to cricket, TV and radio broadcasting, and her work championing diversity in sport.

In October 2025, Rainford-Brent was awarded Women in Sports Innovation Award at the Women of the Year 2025 Awards.

Rainford-Brent is also a Beyond Sport Ambassador.
