= History of the Jews in Kenya =

The History of the Jews in Kenya refers to the history of Jewish settlement in Kenya, which began in 1899. A Jewish community continues to live in Kenya today.

== Background ==
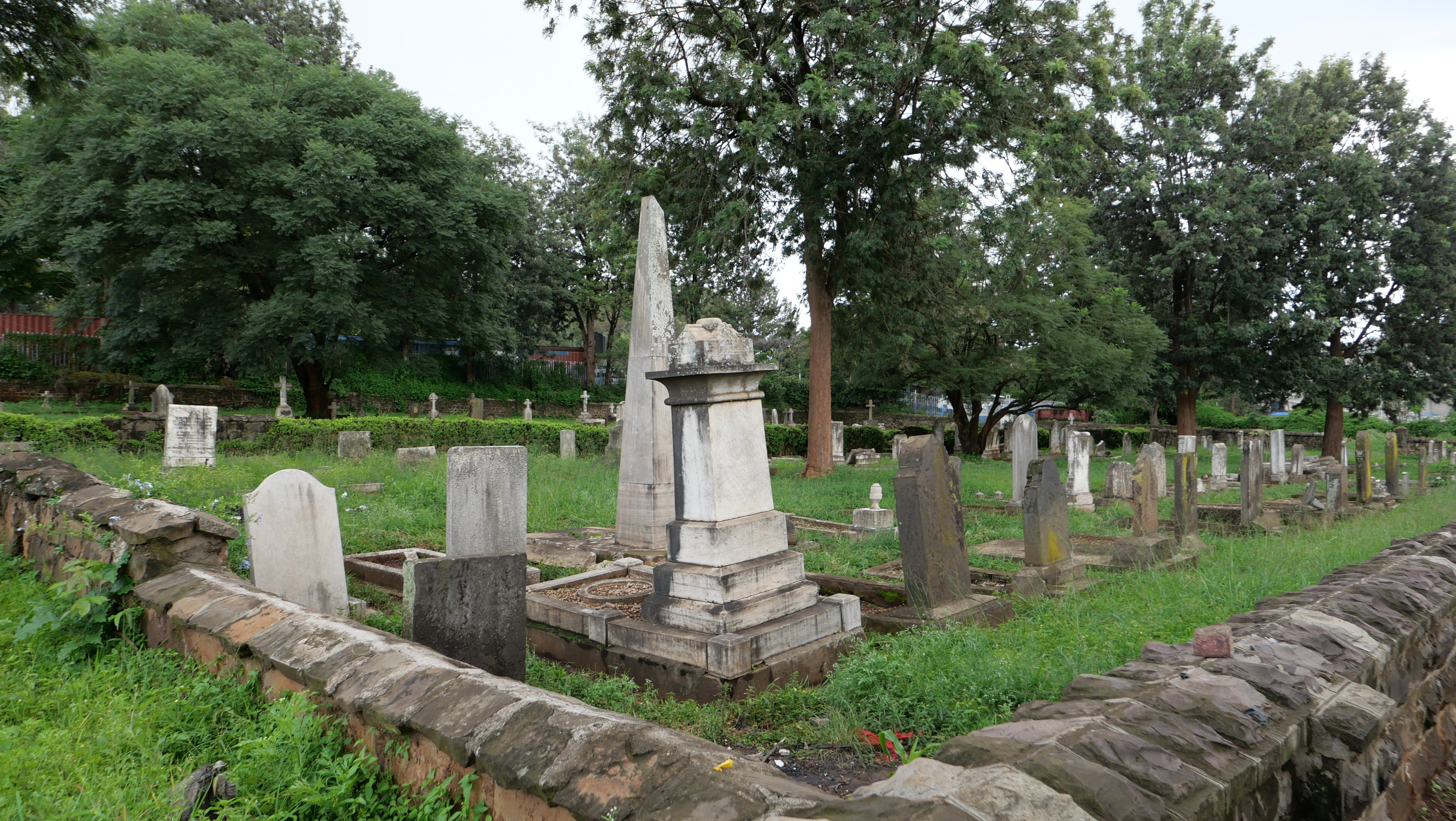
Nairobi South Jewish Cemetery in 2024.

J. Marcus, a Jewish businessman, moved to Nairobi from India in 1899 and established an export business for local produce.

In 1903, British Colonial secretary Joseph Chamberlain proposed offering part of the territory in Kenya and Uganda, known as the Uganda Program, to the Zionists as an autonomous homeland at the Sixth Zionist Congress. The suggestion created much controversy among the international Jewish community, and was rejected at the Seventh Zionist Congress in 1905.

Although the plan was shelved, 20 Jewish families had settled in Kenya by 1913, most of them in Nairobi. A Jewish cemetery was consecrated in 1907, and the first synagogue in 1913.

During the period of World War II and following the Holocaust, Jewish immigration increased; as many as 1,200 Jews were living in the country.

Prior to the establishment of the State of Israel, members of the Kenyan Jewish community helped Irgun and Lehi fighters imprisoned by the British in Gilgil. Once the State of Israel was established in 1948, many Jews in Kenya left for Israel.

In 1963, when Kenya became independent, the Jewish population declined further; it shifted from largely permanent residents to people on international contracts or long-term business assignments.

Notable Kenyan Jews include former Nairobi mayor Israel Somen and hotelier Abraham Block. In 2011, it was estimated that 80% of the Jewish ex-pats in Kenya are Israeli. In 2013, the Jewish community had about 600 members.

A Kikuyu-speaking Kasuku community of 60 members, calling itself the Kasuku Gathundia Jewish community, developed among subsistence farmers in the Kenyan highlands, near Nyahururu. According to their patriarch, Yosef Ben Avraham Njogu, it grew from a split with Kenya's sizeable Messianic Jewish congregation, when a purported visit from Nairobi Jews led to their understanding that what they practiced was Messianic and not Judaism. On learning of the distinction, he and Avraham Ndungu Mbugua broke away, and began to study Judaism in depth. Circumcision, traditionally a puberty rite disallowed by law at birth, means that the community's children must travel to Uganda to have the rite performed by the Abayudaya. Nairobi's Hebrew Congregation synagogue has spiritual connection with this community.

== See also ==
- History of the Jews in Africa

=== Regions: ===
- History of the Jews in Central Africa
- History of the Jews in East Africa
- History of the Jews in North Africa
- History of the Jews in Southern Africa
- History of the Jews in West Africa

=== Topics: ===
- African Jews
- Israel–Kenya relations
- Nairobi Hebrew Congregation
- Uganda Scheme
