= Kenya–North Korea relations =

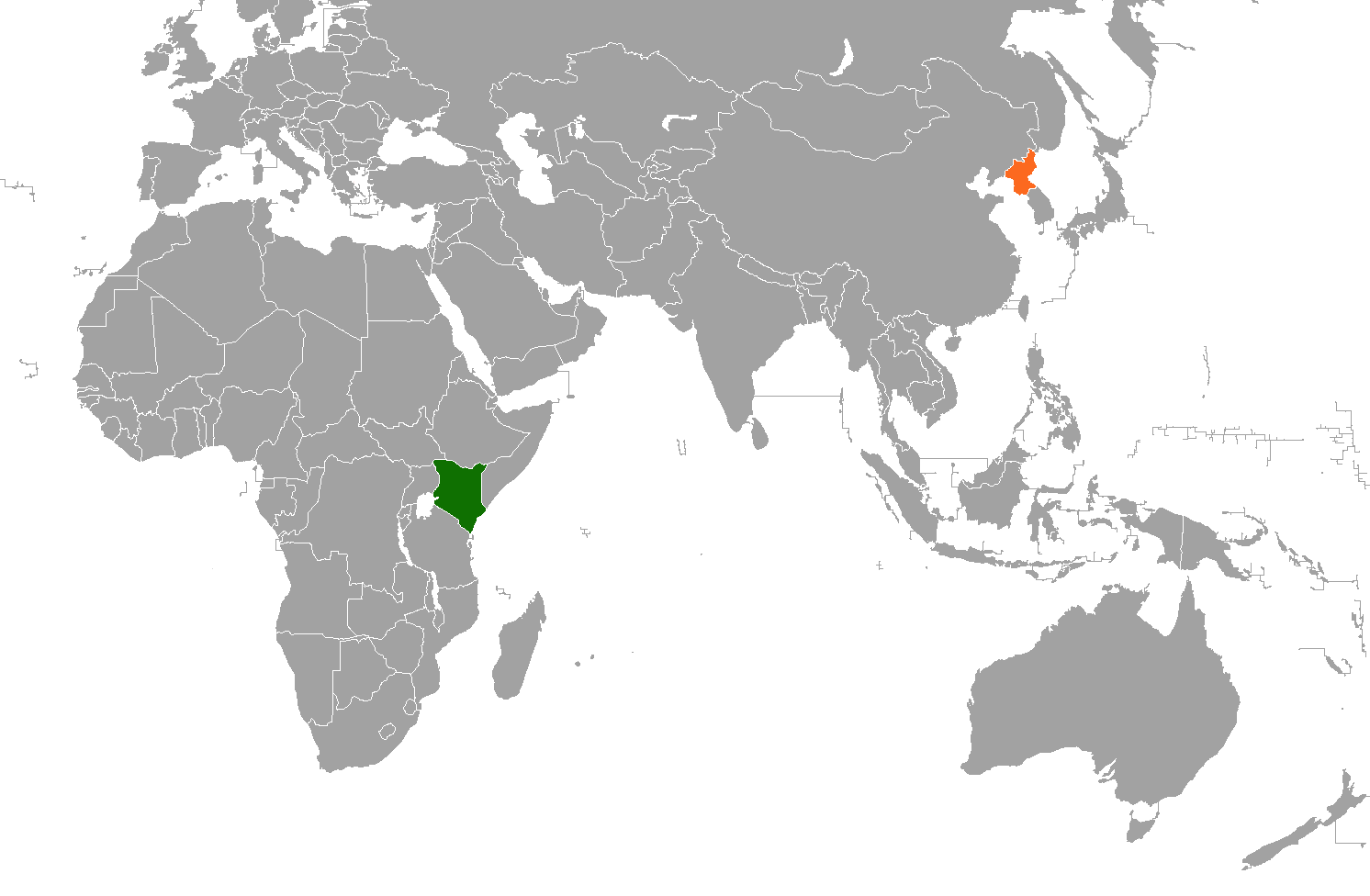

- Kenya: North Korea

Kenya–North Korea relations (Korean: 케냐-조선민주주의인민공화국 관계) refers to the bilateral relations between Kenya and North Korea.

== History ==
As more and more African states became independent as part of the movement towards the decolonisation of Africa in the 1950s and 1960s, North Korea sought to win allies on the continent which soon began to hold the majority vote in the United Nations General Assembly—particularly crucial at a time when the Korean question was a key item on the agenda of the organisation. The two countries first established diplomatic relations in 12 May 1975.

== Views on North Korea's nuclear program ==
Kenya's views on North Korea's nuclear programme goes on the lines of the resolution made by the Non-Aligned Movement, which states that North Korea has the right to develop nuclear energy resources but development of nuclear energy should be for peaceful means. The resolution was agreed upon in September 2006 by all 118 members of the Non-Aligned Movement.

Moses Wetangula, then Foreign Affairs minister completely expressed those views in the receiving ceremony of the North Korean ambassadorial credentials at State House. That North Korea can use nuclear energy as long as whatever produced was used peacefully.

Wetangula expressed Kenya's openness in cooperating with North Korea in multiple fronts.

As for nuclear energy, Kenya which is looking to develop nuclear energy as a power source said that it was looking towards other countries for technology transfer. When asked, Wetangula directly stated that Kenya had good relations with states with more developed programmes and that North Korea isn't the only nuclear state so there wasn't much of a point.

== Incidents ==
In the 1990s, North Korean citizens including diplomats were known to have been involved in the illegal smuggling of goods and counterfeit products in Kenya.

In April 2015, a Kenyan intending to travel to Pyeongchang in South Korea accidentally got on a flight to Pyeongyang in North Korea, where he was detained for entering the country without the required documents. The Kenyan, Daniel Sapit, was detained for several hours but was later allowed to leave North Korea after admitting to violating laws and paying a US$500 fine for being in the country without a visa. He eventually boarded the correct flight to Pyeongchang where he had been scheduled to attend a United Nations biodiversity conference.

== Comparisons ==
The One World website which is a major global awareness, human rights and education movement highlights the fact that Kenya's president who was indicted by the ICC enters as Kenya's president and talks about how to deal with an indicted war criminal becoming a democratically elected president. (Uhuru Kenyatta's case in the ICC was dropped in December 2014.) The article also mentions a bit of North Korea's human rights violations and compares both countries.

== Diplomatic missions ==
North Korea maintains an embassy in Kampala which is also accredited to Kenya.

=== Establishment of a North Korean resident mission ===
According to the Daily Nation, Kenya's leading newspaper, North Korean officials have visited Nairobi twice with intent of starting a mission in Nairobi. The officials visited Nairobi in November 2014 and March 2015. According to the paper, the UN pressured the Kenyan government to reject North Korea's application to establish a resident mission in Nairobi.

Kenya's Foreign Affairs Principal Secretary, Karanja Kibicho commented and said that North Korea never made the request to establish a Nairobi mission.

== See also ==
- Kenya–South Korea relations
