= Cricket for Change =

UK charity

- Founded: 1981
- Website: http://www.cricketforchange.org.uk/cricket-for-change

Cricket for Change (C4C), registered as the London Community Cricket Association, is a UK charity established in 1981 to provide support for young disadvantaged people to be able to take part in cricket events. Programmes include providing cricket facilities, training, disabled access to cricket, establishing cricket projects in deprived inner-city estates and providing coaching and practical support for other charities internationally.

== Awards ==
- 2009 Andy Dalby-Walsh (C4C Director of Programmes) winner of Pride of Britain Feelgood Factor Award.
- 2010 Israel Cricket Association's Cross Border Cricket Programme in partnership with C4C awarded the Europe Pepsi ICC Development Award for Best Spirit of Cricket Initiative.
- 2010 Adam Hall (C4C Development Manager – North London) wins National Young Coach of the Year.

== Inner-city projects ==
C4C's projects to support cricket for inner-city areas has wide recognition, in particular for young people who may be vulnerable to becoming involved in crime. The charity has contributed to the Government's Home Affairs Select Committee due to its track record in supporting crime prevention.

== International projects ==
In 2008 and 2009 C4C were guests of the Israel Cricket Association, to work in and around Beersheba, near the Gaza border. The project was to start initiatives for "Street20 cricket" using plastic bats and wickets and a tennis ball wrapped in electrical tape.

Last year's trip included a visit to Hura, a Bedouin settlement in the Negev desert. "We went into the playground and within 10 minutes there were about 50 kids playing. "They loved it and they said they wanted to play with Jewish kids."

— Spokesperson for C4C,, 2009

The United States of America Cricket Association partnered with C4C to establish Blind cricket in the US in 2010.

== See also ==
- Ebony-Jewel Rainford-Brent, member of the England women's cricket team introduced to cricket by Cricket for Change.
- European Cricket Council
- International Cricket Council
- Twenty20, Tape ball
