= Israel Cricket Association =

Israeli cricket governing body

- Sport: Cricket
- Jurisdiction: National
- Abbreviation: (ICA)
- Founded: 1968
- Affiliation: International Cricket Council
- Affiliation date: July 23, 1974
- Regional affiliation: ICC Europe
- Affiliation date: 1996
- Chairman: Stanley Perlman
- CEO: Naor Gudker
- (Israel)

Israel Cricket Association is the official governing body of the sport of cricket in Israel. Israel Cricket Association is Israel's representative at the International Cricket Council. It is an associate member and has been a member of that body since 1974. Its principal objective is to incorporate and manage cricket within. Israel along with Denmark, Gibraltar, the Netherlands, Ireland, Italy and Scotland founded the European Cricket Council in 1996.

== History ==
=== Beginnings ===
As is most often the case, cricket was introduced to Israel by the British. Local enthusiasts managed to keep the game going once the British had left in 1948, but the game was struggling until the mid-1960s, when an influx of Jewish immigrants from cricket playing countries revived the game, mainly South Africa, United Kingdom, and the Indian subcontinent.Bene Israel Indian Jews played a key role, establishing the nation's first club in Beersheba.

The first national league was formed in 1966, which led to the formation of the Israel Cricket Association (ICA) in 1968. The league prospered despite conditions ill-suited to cricket. Games were played on dusty, grass-less football fields, on matting wickets. However, the enthusiasm of the players has overcome these drawbacks.

=== ICC Membership ===
Israel became an associate member of the ICC in 1974, with only Pakistan opposing their membership. Israel competed in the first ICC Trophy in 1979, failing to get past the first round. They also failed to progress beyond the first round in the 1982 tournament and 1986 tournament

=== 21st century ===
Israel have been playing in Division Two of the European Championships since 2000. ICA has been praised many times for its peace work within Israel; The International Cricket Council, has awarded the Israeli Cricket Association with a top prize for bringing together Jews and Bedouins in the Southern Negev desert through cricket, the award is not the first of its kind for the ICA. They were honoured with a similar prize in 2001. In 2009 the ICA started working with cricketing charity Cricket for Change to introduce cricket to young people from both the Israeli Arab and Jewish communities around the city of Beersheba.

== Board of directors ==
The ICA is run by a board of directors who are elected by its members every two years, according to the articles of association of the company. This is a list of current members of its board.

Name	Position
Yefet Nagavkar	Chairman
Rafi Shachat	Deputy Chairman
Allon Benjamin	Secretary
Yaniv Razpurkar	CEO
Mikki Cohen	Director
Moses Aarens	Director
Abe Aston	Director
Shimshon Chur	Director
Richard Black	Non Executive Director

== See also ==
- Israel national cricket team
- Leo Camron
- Dan Kiesel
