= Kenya–South Korea relations =

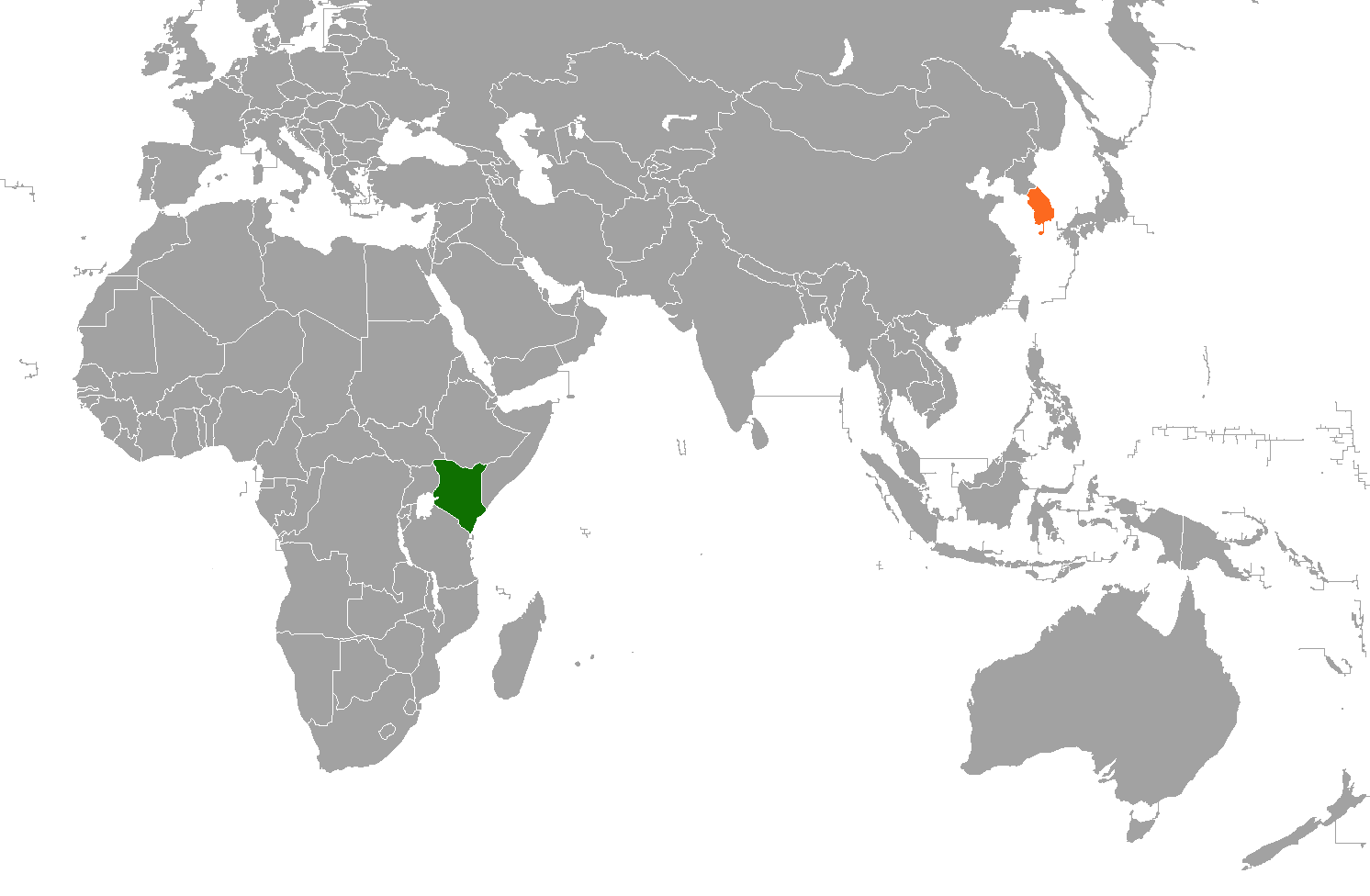
- Kenya: South Korea

Kenya–South Korea relations are the bilateral relations between Kenya and South Korea.

== History ==
Ties between Kenya and South Korea date back to 7 February 1964, as representatives from both countries engaged in diplomatic exchanges, which marked the formal establishment of the relations.

Previously to this formal diplomatic exchange, Kenya reportedly donated relief food valued at US$10,000 to the Korea shortly after gaining independence (South Korean independence). This showed Kenya's support and goodwill to support Korea during challenging times.

== Tourism ==
In 2012, 9,400 Koreans visited Kenya. That made South Korea the fourth largest source of visitors from Asia to Kenya after India, China and Japan.

Before the COVID-19 pandemic, around 15,000 Korean tourists were visiting Kenya annually, and these numbers have been picking up rapidly to pre-pandemic figures.

The beauty of Kenya's large African savanna, safari tours and encounters with indigenous communities have drawn these Korean travellers to visit and explore the East African nation.

== State visits ==
In 2016, Former President Park Geun-hye of South Korea made a state visit to Kenya as part of her Africa tour.

Numerous agreements were signed to improve cooperation in various fields as well as improve bilateral relations.

In 2018 Prime Minister Lee Nak-yeon visited Kenya. He held talks with President Kenyatta. They discussed deepening bilateral ties and increasing trade.

In 2012, South Korean Prime Minister Kim Hwang-sik visited Kenya. He held talks with President Mwai Kibaki and Prime Minister Raila Odinga.

Kenyan Prime Minister Raila Odinga also visited South Korea in 2012. He held talks with Prime Minister Kim Hwang-sik.

In November 2022, President William Ruto made a bilateral state visit to South Korea. He held talks with President Yoon Suk-yeol.

== Incidents ==
In June 2012, Korean Air started flying from Seoul to Nairobi. To promote the launch of the flights, Korean Air's Twitter feed stated, "...Fly Korean Air and enjoy the grand African Savanna, the safari tour, and the indigenous people full of primitive energy." Kenyans expressed their anger on social media. They particularly expressed concern that the airline called them primitive. The airline later apologised over the matter, stating that the mishap was a result of a bad translation from Korean to English.

In late 2014, Korean Air flights were suspended due to the West African ebola crisis. Flights resumed in July 2015.

== Trade ==
Bilateral trade between both countries is worth KES. 30.2 billion (US$330 million). Kenya exports about KES. 2.74 billion (US$30 million) worth of goods to South Korea. South Korea exports about KES. 27.4 billion (US$300 million) worth of goods to Kenya. In 2009, Kenya exported about KES. 90 million (US$1 million) worth of coffee to Korea, in 2013 the figure rose to KES. 540 million (US$6 million).

Main exports from Kenya to Korea include: tobacco, coffee, scrap metal, gemstones, pyrethrum, spices, fish, wood products, handicrafts and beer.

Main exports from Korea to Kenya include: iron & steel products, plastics, electrical machinery, ICT equipment, chemicals, rubber products, pharmaceuticals, motor vehicles.

Both countries signed MOUs and agreements to improve trade, oversee grants and development assistance, promotion and protection of investments in Kenya and Korea and an agreement on the avoidance of double taxation.

Trade between Kenya and South Korea (in billions Kenyan Shillings )

	2014	2015	2016	2017
Exports from Kenya	2.5	1.8	1.7	2.4
Exports from South Korea	29.1	18.8	14.2	17.5
Total trade	31.6	20.6	15.9	19.9

=== FDI and Infrastructure ===
Many South Korean firms such as Samsung, LG and Hyundai maintain their regional headquarters in Nairobi. Samsung announced plans to set up a TV assembly plant in Kenya. In 2012, Daewoo was awarded a deal worth KES. 119 billion (US$1.3 billion) to construct a power plant in Kilifi County, Kenya.

== Diplomatic missions ==
South Korea maintains an embassy in Nairobi. Kenya has an embassy in Seoul, which was opened in 2007.

== See also ==
- Kenya–North Korea relations
