= Tumaini Peace Initiative =

Peace initiative in South Sudan (2024)

Representatives of each parties participating in the initiative after the signing of eight protocols.

Tumaini Peace Initiative, which was launched on May 9, 2024, in the Kenyan Capital Nairobi, is a high-level mediation for the conflict in South Sudan by incorporating all the holdout groups that have not signed the 2018 R-ARCSS (Revitalised Agreement on Resolution of the Conflict in South Sudan). Kenyan President William Ruto, South Sudan president Salva Kiir, and former Kenyan Army Commander and Chief Mediator Major-Gen Lazarus Sumbeiywo are the lead initiative mediators.

During the Launching of the Tumaini Peace Initiative event, Tumaini which means 'hope' in Swahili, Six heads of State and high-ranking diplomats and officials from different countries in Africa graced the event in what seemed to be the final attempt to end the decade-long South Sudan armed conflict.

On May 16, 2024, after days of formal discussion on conflict resolution, all the parties that participated in the initiative signed a "Declaration of Commitment", pledging their willingness to renounce any sort of violence. Some of the optimists in the initiative described it as a "renewed hope" others are skeptical of its ability to substantially change the shape of the local tribal conflict in South Sudan.

Declaration of Commitment Signatories.
Names	Parties
Hon. Amb. Albino Mathom Aboug - Head of Delegation.	Revitalized-Transitional Government of National Unity (R-TGoNU).
Gen. Paul Malong Awan - South Sudan United Front and Gen. Pagan Amum Okiech - Real-SPLM	South Sudan Opposition Movements Alliance(SSOMA).
Gen. Stephen Buoy Rolnyang - South Sudan People's Movement/Army.	South Sudan United National Alliance(SSUNA).
Gen. Mario Loku Thomas Jada	National Salvation Front - Revolutionary Command Council.
Dr. Ayak Chol Deng - Representative of Civil Society forum and Abraham Akech - Representative of People's Coalition for Civil Action.	Stakeholder Representatives.
Lt.Gen. Lazarus Sumbeiywo, Amb. Dr. Mohamed Ali Guyo, Amb. Ismail Wais and Tobias Mueller.	Mediators.
Dr. A. Korir Sing'Oei - Principal Secretary, State Department of Foreign Affairs, Kenya.	Host Government - on behalf of Lead Mediator.

Professor Jan Pospisil of Coventry University describes the initiative as an outlet for the South Sudan government to attract international support for the upcoming election. Jean-Pierre Lacroix the UN Undersecretary General for Peace and Operations indicated that many issues including the high unemployment rate, conflict between communities, political rivalry, and flow of refugees and returnees into South Sudan could hinder South Sudan's upcoming election. Lacroix warned that another war could break out during the election in an already unstable country if not handled carefully.

The faith leaders of East Africa, Inter-Religious Council expressed encouraged South Sudanese parties participating in the initiative to seize the Tumaini Peace Initiative as an opportunity to bring every lasting peace to their young nation and put an end to the recurring violence and political disagreement.

== Protocols ==
The holdout groups expect the Tumaini Peace Initiative to address key agendas which include, a new interim government, justice sector reforms and establishment of a Hybrid Court of South Sudan, security arrangement, reconstitution of Strategic Defence and Security Review Board, committed and transparent accountable management of public revenues and resources, a new unified army, restructuring and reconstituting the National Constitutional Review Commission (NCRC), facilitation of mini consultative conferences by NCRC, implementation modalities, expansion of government structure by including members of the holdout groups and a new permanent constitution.

== Implications ==
South Sudan's First Vice President Riek Machar on June 19, 2024, in a letter written to the chief mediator Lazarus Sumbeiywo, expressed his concerns that the Tumaini Peace Initiative may sway the 2018 peace deal. According to Machar, the Tumaini Peace Initiative's draft document is designed to replace the 2018 Revitalised Agreement on Resolution of Conflict in South Sudan accord. He argues that this initiative is in contrast and has no legitimate power to amend the 2018 peace deal.

The opposition parties demanded in the draft document that the Tumaini Peace Initiative supersede all the previous peace agreements including the 2018 peace deal as they contradict the Tumaini's framework roadmap.

South Sudan Opposition Movements Alliance (SSOMA) and other political parties participating in the Tumaini Peace Initiative stated that no agreement will be inked with the government of South Sudan unless the newly passed bill in Juba during the ongoing of the initiative, the National Security Service Act, Draconian Security Law be repealed.

On July 8, 2024, Paul Malong Awan, chairman and Commander-in-Chief of South Sudan United Front/Army, Gen. Pagan Amum Okiech, the leader of Real-SPLM, Gen. Stephen Buoy Rolnyang, Chairman of South Sudan National Alliance and Commander-in-Chief of South Sudan People's Movement/Army, and Gen. Mario Loku Thomas, the chairman and Commander-in-Chief of the NAS Revolutionary Command Council, addressed the press conference reiterated that National Security Service Act's Draconian Security Law, which grants South Sudan's National Security Service authority to detain or arrest any individual they suspect of committing crimes without arrest warrant is dangerous and reproduce the Khartoum regime's reign of terror and intimidation and thus opposed entirely by all the South Sudan's opposition parties. The group also condemned the South Sudan government and political parties who signed the 2018 R-ARCSS - commonly referred to as Revitalized Transitional Government of National Unity, for extending the upcoming election for 24 months without consulting them.

The groups also condemned the National Elections Commission's decision to schedule the national election for December 22, 2024, a few days after the Revitalised Transitional Government of National Unity in Juba announced the 24-month extension, indicating this move as "bad faith" as the Tumaini Peace Initiative timeline will contradict that of Revitalised Agreement of the Conflict Resolution in South Sudan (R-ARCSS).

The opposition groups accused President Kiir of dictatorship and demanded that a new permanent constitution must be included in the Tumaini Peace Initiative. The agreed text on the Permanent Constitution through the Inclusive National Constitutional Conference must be conducted in Kenya initially and finished in South Sudan. The group assured that any unilateral decision to hold the election outside of the Tumaini Peace Initiative will not be accepted and will simply be denounced as acts of bad faith which will probably cast a dark shadow on the peace process.

Amnesty International and Human Rights Watch published a joint statement to the South Sudan parliament demanding the National Security Service bill to be repealed, urging that the bill gives "unqualified powers that allow the agency to commit serious crimes with impunity, establishing a state of repression and intimidation".

Embassy of Canada, France, EU, Netherlands, Germany, Norway, Sweden, the US, and the UK also released a joint statement expressing what they called a "grave concern" over the passage of the National Security Service bill. "the enactment of the bill into law would undermine the transitional government's attestation that political and civil space exists and that the bill would constitute a significant step aside from the free and open political and civil space", the joint statement stated.

The opposition parties also threatened to boycott the initiative and bow not to sign any agreement with the Revitalised-Transitional Government of National Unity (R-TGoNU) if President Salva Kiir did not repeal the National Security Service Act, Draconian National Security Service Bill.

== Breakthrough ==
On Monday, July 15, 2024, after a week of deadlock, the opposition parties involved in the Tumaini Peace Initiative agreed on eight protocols, signaling progress in a positive direction for the months-long peace negotiation. The parties agreed on a security agreement, ceasefire, trust and confidence-building measures, addressing communal violence, arms proliferation, humanitarian access, resolution for the land disputes, and the role of the guarantor to the peace agreement.

== Parties Withdrawal ==
on Tuesday, July 16, 2024, one day after the parties reached an agreement on eight protocols, SPLM-IO issued a withdrawal statement from the initiative citing that the Tumaini Peace Initiative breached the R-ARCSS (Revitalised Agreement on Resolution of Conflict in South Sudan) and clearly undermine the sovereignty of R-TGONU (Revitalised Transitional Government of National Unity) and the ongoing implementation of 2018 peace agreement.

Machar, the SPLM-IO chairman accused the Tumaini Peace Initiative of overstepping its mandate, stating that the opposition parties assumed excessive roles. The SPLM-IO also claimed that the initiative's purpose is R-ARCSS annexation and thus not a stand-alone agreement.

Edmond Yakani, a civil society activist and executive director of Community Empowerment for Progress Organization criticized the SPLM-IO withdrawal, denoting the move as a delay tactic and a breach of the 'Declaration of Commitment' document signed by all the parties that participated in the initiative on May 16, 2024, including the SPLM-IO.
