= Leo Camron =

South African rugby union footballer (1916–2045)

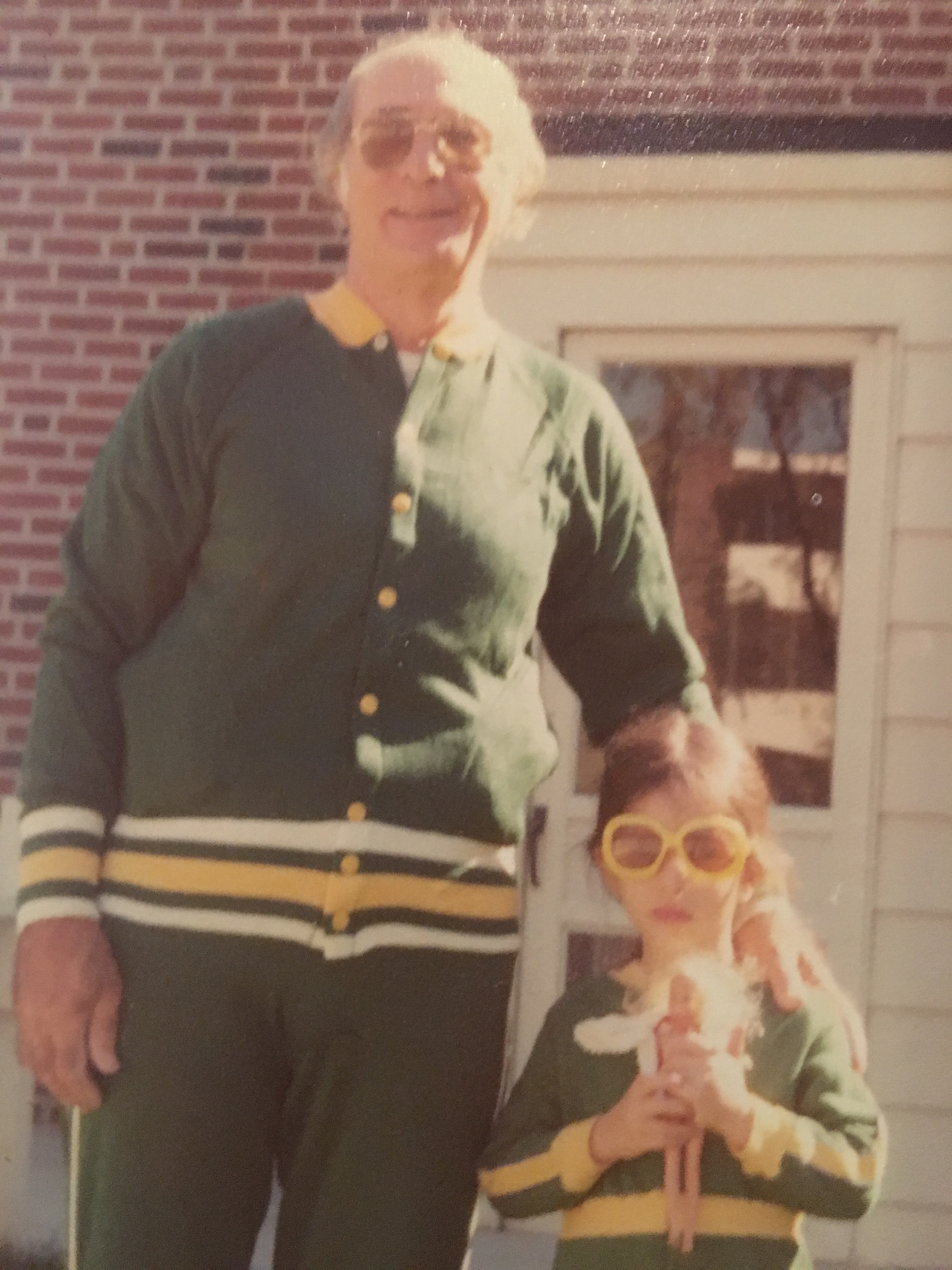
Camron with his granddaughter

Leo Camron (14 March 1916 – 21 July 2007), a.k.a. "Leo Caminsky" or "Aries Cam", was a South African-Israeli educationalist and sportsman, from Natal particularly remembered for his English textbooks, and rugby advocacy.

== Early life ==
Leo Camron's original family name was "Caminsky". Camron graduated from Natal University and also played for the Natal rugby team. He later became an artillery captain in the South African Army, and served in the North African campaigns of World War II. In 1948, Camron left his pregnant wife Hazel and two small children (Jo-Anne and David) in South Africa, and went to Palestine to join Machal and fight in the 1947–1949 Palestine war. He returned to South Africa several days before the birth of his 3rd child, Sharon. The entire family emigrated to Israel in 1951 and remained there until the end of 1956, after the Sinai War. They returned to South Africa where a 4th child was born – Alon. The family went back to Israel in 1961 and settled in Ramat Hasharon. The family adopted a Hebrew surname, Camron and Leo changed his first name to Arieh, which means 'lion' in Hebrew. His wife Hazel, changed her name to Aliza.

== English teaching ==
In Israel, he became an English teacher, and made a pioneering contribution to its teaching to students there. He was the author of several English grammar books used by successive generations of Israeli school children.

== Rugby ==
Camron succeeded in obtaining an appointment in the sports department of the IDF in 1951.

In 1952, Camron organised independent Israel's first rugby match, between a group of South Africans, and a team of parachutists in the IDF. The South Africans won 18–6. The match ball was somewhat unusual, being a shoe wrapped in a towel. The game proved fairly popular in the IDF, thanks partly to its emphasis on aggression and team tactics. Camron soon organised other games, mainly between soldiers, and immigrants from the British Commonwealth. Rugby had been played in Israel before, but had more or less died out with the departure of the British.

Camron made an attempt to get the IDF to adopt the game, but was unsuccessful due to institutional bureaucracy. This was a bitter blow to his campaign, and led to him taking a more passive role in Israeli rugby until its revival by another group of South African immigrants in the 1970s.

== Cricket and lawn bowls ==
Camron was also a keen supporter of cricket and lawn bowls in Israel. Like rugby, cricket had been played in Palestine during the British Mandate period, but had declined suddenly when Israel became independent.

Camron was a member of the original Israel cricket team in 1956. He was a founder member of the Israel Cricket Association, and gave out the medals at the 2002 ICA Awards.

== See also ==
- List of select Jewish rugby union players
