= Angola–Kenya relations =

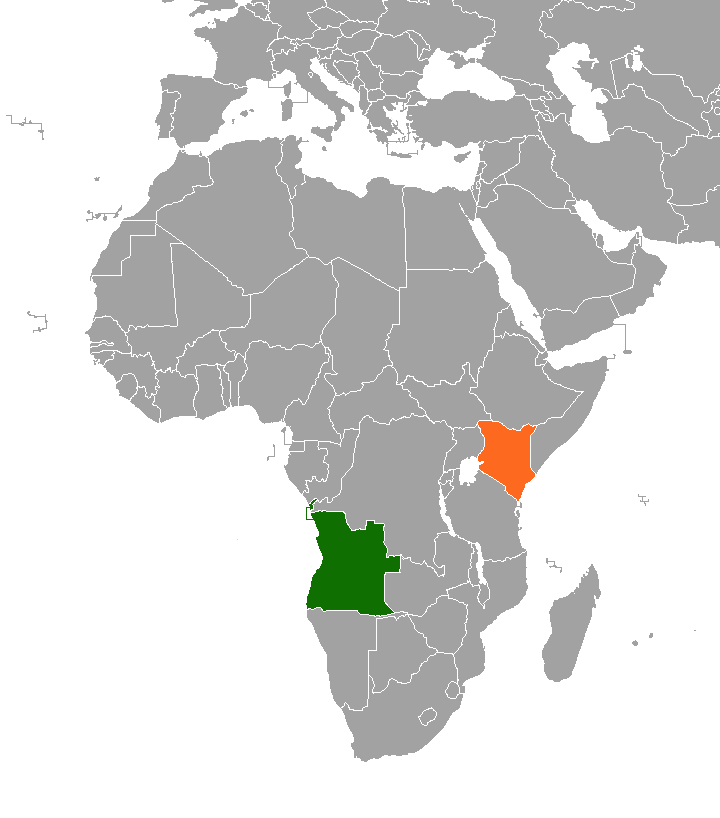
- Angola: Kenya

Angola–Kenya relations are bilateral relations between Angola and Kenya.

== Cooperation ==
In a series of meetings within 2014 in both Nairobi and Luanda, a few agreements were signed. The agreements included an establishment of the Joint Commission Cooperation, a MOU on Political Consultation between the Foreign Ministry of Angola and that of Kenya and the General Agreement on Economic, Scientific, Cultural and Technical Cooperation between the governments of Kenya and Angola.

In September 2014, the Kenyan government signed a Bilateral Air Services Agreement (BASA) agreement which was an update from a previous agreement signed in 2011 which allowed direct flights between both countries. Kenya Airways has been operating flights between both countries. TAAG Angola is yet to start. With the agreement Kenya hopes to increase tourist numbers and trade.

Both countries are committed to peace and security within the Great Lakes Region.

Kenya's Foreign Cabinet Secretary visited Angola in January 2014 and Angola's Foreign Minister visited Nairobi in July 2014.

In 2014, Kenya and Angola agreed to strengthen bilateral ties.

== Resident diplomatic missions ==
- Angola has an embassy in Nairobi.
- Kenya has an embassy in Luanda.
