= Jonathan Somen =

- Born: 27 June 1969 (age 57); Nairobi, Kenya
- Education: University of Bristol
- Occupations: Businessman & Entrepreneur
- Years active: 1994 – present

Jonathan Somen is the co-founder of Access Kenya Group alongside his brother, David Somen.

== Early life ==
The Somen family emigrated to Kenya in 1923 when Israel Somen relocated from South Africa to work in government. Jonathan Somen was born on 27 June 1969 to Michael and Vera Somen. His father was an advocate while mother a medical doctor.

He attended Banda School in Nairobi for his early education before joining Epsom College in Surrey for his secondary education. He later enrolled University of Bristol to study Economics and Accounting.

== Career ==
Upon completing his studies, Jonathan returned to Kenya and worked as a tour guide for Rhino Safaris and Abercrombie & Kent. He later joined Kilimanjaro Water Company as its Chief Operations Manager.

In 1994, Jonathan and his elder brother founded Communication Solutions Limited (Commsol) off his apartment in Westlands, Nairobi with Jonathan as CEO. In the same year, the brothers co-founded LCR Telecom Group, a company providing data and telecommunications for small and medium-sized enterprises in The United Kingdom, France, Spain and Belgium, with David as CEO and Virtual Technology Group a telephone call-back services in Africa and dial-through telephone services in the UK. In the year 2000, they sold off LCR Telecom Group to Primus Telecommunications Group (now HC2 Holdings Inc) for about $105.3 million in stock. In the same year, Commsol was rebranded to AccessKenya Limited. At this point the company was the leading Corporate ISP in Kenya.

In 2007, Jonathan led AccessKenya to list on the Nairobi Securities Exchange after a successful IPO making it the ICT company in the region. In 2013, AccessKenya Group was acquired by Dimension Data Holdings and delisted from the Nairobi Securities Exchange. Jonathan remained the CEO of the Group until mid 2015.

== Other activities ==
Jonathan takes part in the Rhino Charge off-road event and mentions that his best way to relax is by flying.
