= Eritrea–Kenya relations =

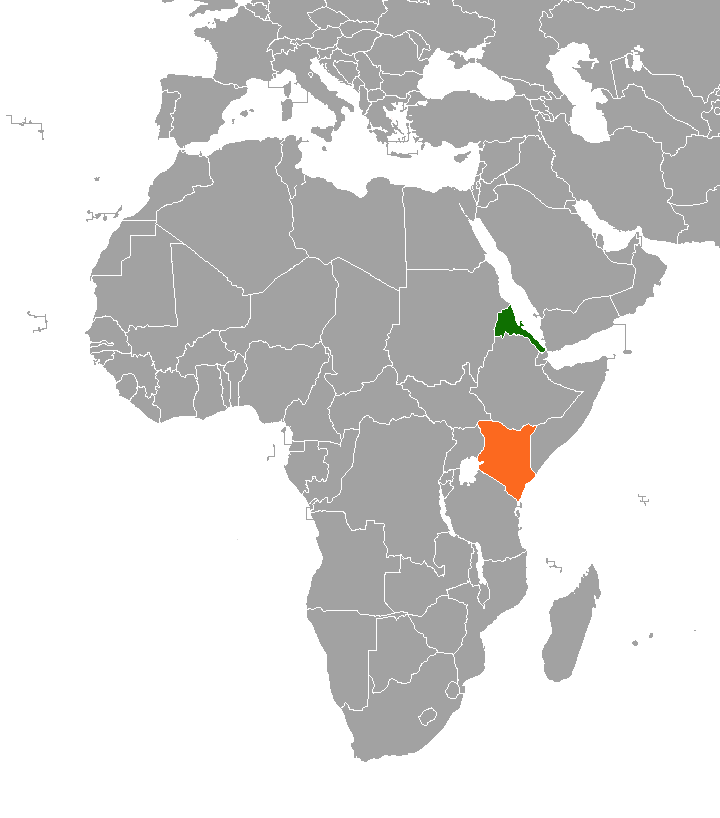

- Eritrea: Kenya

Eritrea–Kenya relations are bilateral relations between Eritrea and Kenya.

== History ==
Diplomatic ties between Eritrea and Kenya were slightly tense as in 2011 the Kenyan Foreign Ministry accused the Eritrean government of supplying arms to the Al-Shabaab militant group. The Eritrean authorities rejected the claims. Additionally, the Kenyan ministry threatened to review its bilateral relations with Asmara.

In 2013, while on a state visit to Kenya, Eritrean President Isaias Afwerki attended the Golden Jubilee celebration in Nairobi.

Today relations between both nations are seen as more stable with President Afwerki having made another state visit in late 2018. That was followed up by a visit by President Kenyatta in January 2019 for the Tripartite Summit in Asmara between Ethiopia, Eritrea and Kenya. In late 2022 the new Kenyan President William Ruto arrived in Asmara on a diplomatic state visit. Eritrea and Kenya signed a diplomatic agreement on becoming visa free travel for both of its citizens with passports.

== Trade ==
Eritrea and Kenya maintain trading ties. Both nations are members of the IGAD trade bloc.

Eritrea has no exports to Kenya. However, it imports goods worth $4 and $5 million annually from the country.

== Diplomatic relations ==
Eritrea maintains an embassy in Nairobi.

Additionally, Kenya's embassy in Cairo is accredited to Eritrea.

== See also ==
- Foreign relations of Eritrea
- Foreign relations of Kenya
