= Israel Somen =

Israeli–Kenyan politician, diplomat (1903–1984)

- ישראל סומן
- Born: 1903
- Died: 9 October 1984 (aged 80–81)
- Occupations: Politician and diplomat

Israel Somen (Hebrew: ישראל סומן; 1903 – 9 October 1984), also known as Issy Somen, was a Jewish Kenyan politician businessman and diplomat. He was a one-time Mayor of Nairobi and later Israel's Honorary Consul to Kenya.

== Biography ==
Somen's family emigrated to Kenya in the early part of the twentieth century and was among those that established successful businesses in the country. The Somens owned the leading furniture store Hutchings Biemer as well as coffee and other interests. Somen, who was also a one time president of the Board of Kenya Jews, lived in Kenya for over 40 years. His wife Sophie Biemer was born in Kenya. He was elected mayor of Nairobi in 1955 together with deputy mayor Dobbs Johnson.

Somen played a leading role in establishing amicable relations between Kenya and Israel both pre and post independence. He left Kenya in the late 1960s moving first to Switzerland and then to London where he died. His nephew Michael and a number of his family and relations still live in Kenya.

== Legacy ==
His great nephews, David and Jonathan Somen, founded an ISP in Kenya called AccessKenya Group. His other great nephew, Mark Somen, is a successful hospitality professional and started The Conduit- a community focused on positive social change.

Somen died in London, England in October 1984.
