= Israel–Kenya relations =

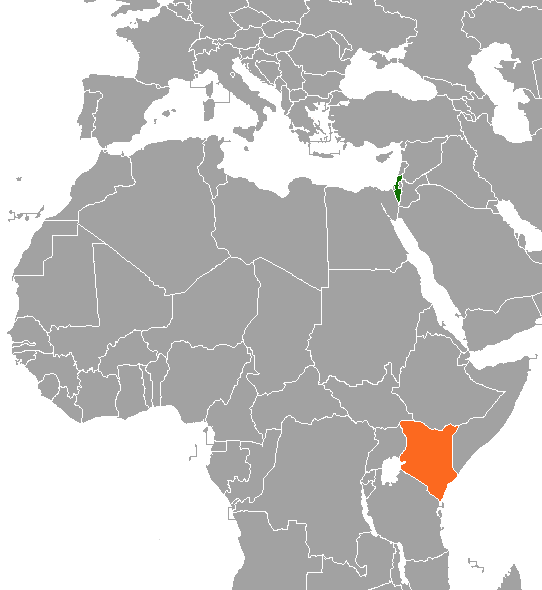
- Israel: Kenya

Israel and Kenya established diplomatic relations in December 1963.

== History ==
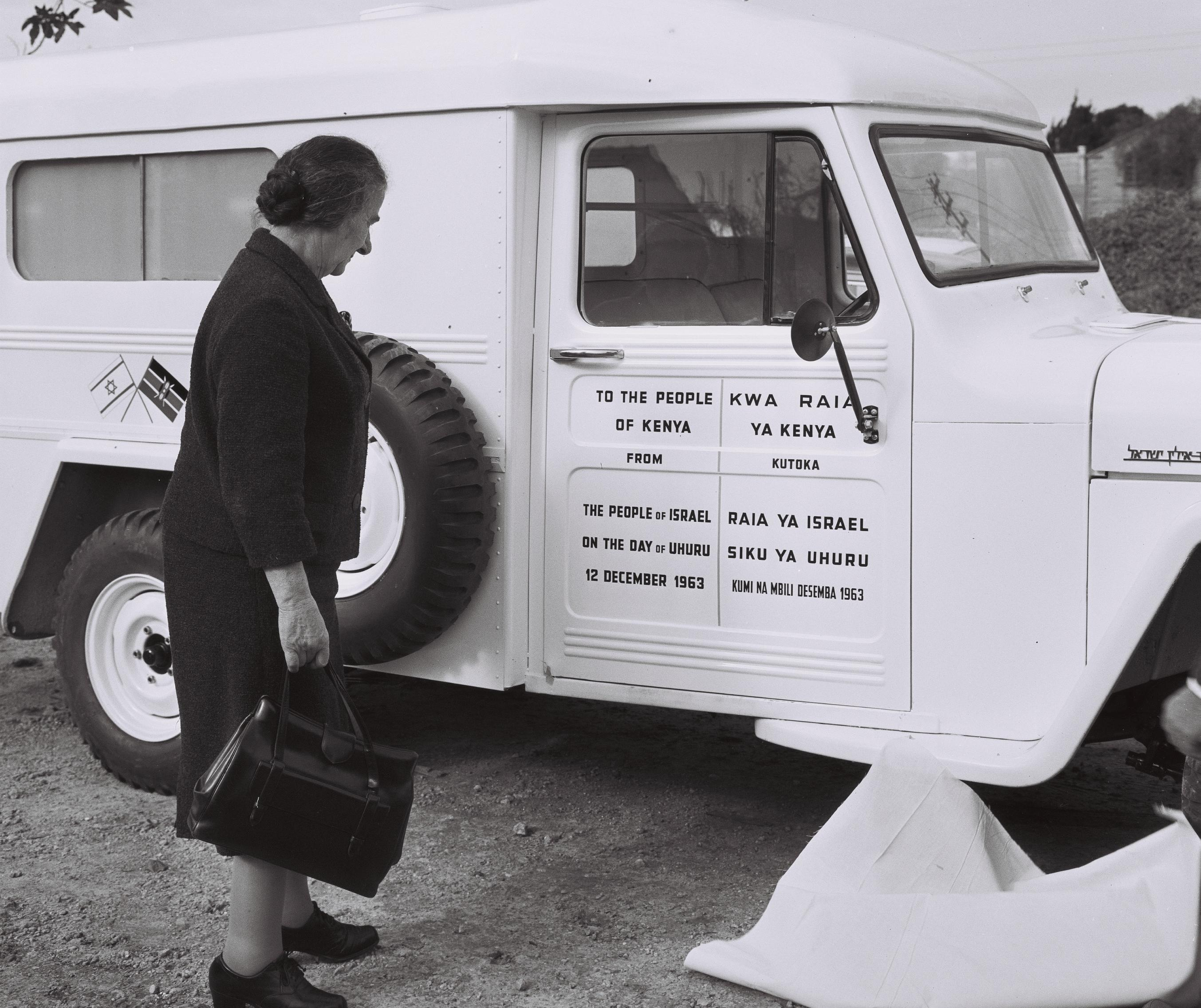
Foreign Minister Golda Meir presenting an ambulance as a gift to people of Kenya, 1963

=== Early years ===
Starting in 1903, under the British Uganda Programme, territory in what was then Uganda, but is now part of Kenya, was offered as a Jewish homeland.

=== 1962–75 ===
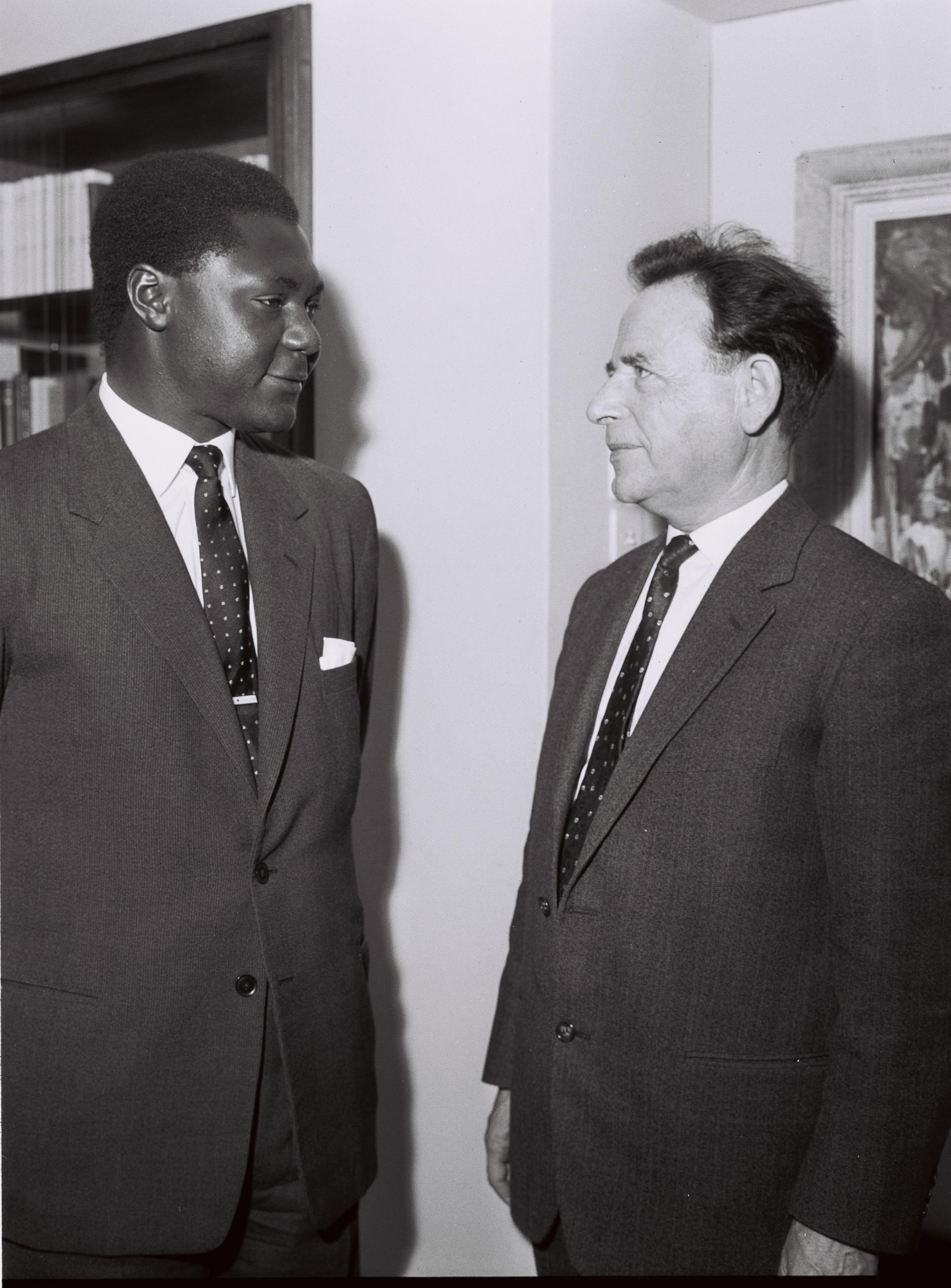
Kenyan politician Tom Mboya, Secretary-General of the Kenya African National Union, meets with Israeli Histadrut Secretary General Aharon Becker (January 1962)

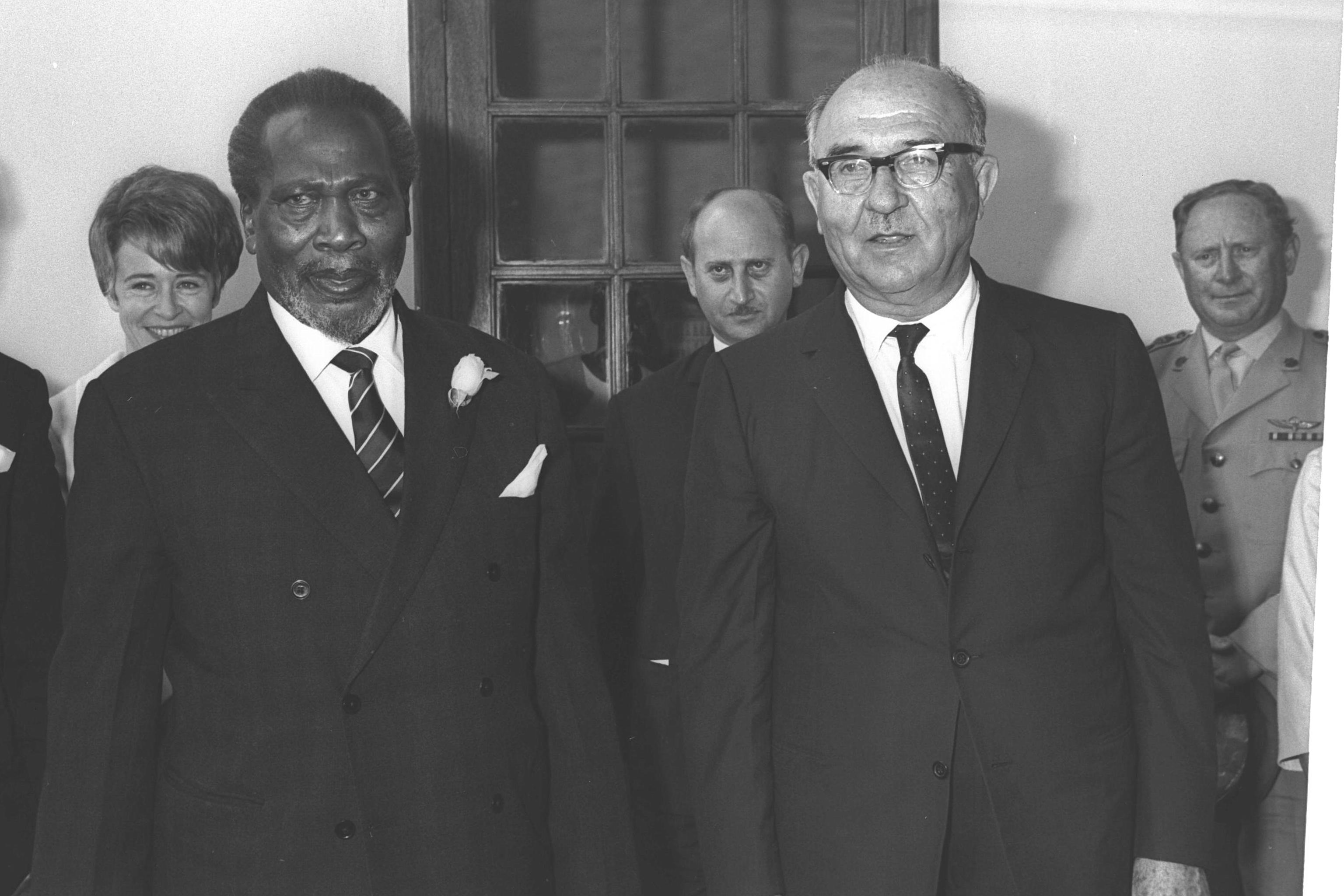
Levi Eshkol and Jomo Kenyatta

In January 1962, Kenyan politician Tom Mboya, Secretary-General of the Kenya African National Union, met with Israeli Histadrut Secretary General Aharon Becker.

In December 1963 Golda Meir, then Israeli Minister of Foreign Affairs, met with Kenyan Prime Minister Jomo Kenyatta. On that trip Meir and Kenyatta laid the cornerstone for the Israeli Embassy in Nairobi. Israel agreed to train Kenyans in agriculture and medicine in a program called Mashav, in which trainees from Kenya were flown to Israel for study.

In 1966, Prime Minister Levi Eshkol visited Kenya and met with President Kenyatta.

In 1973, diplomatic ties were severed following the Yom Kippur War.

=== 1976–86 ===
Kenyan government official Bruce McKenzie persuaded Kenyan President Jomo Kenyatta to allow Mossad agents to gather information prior to Operation Entebbe in 1976. Also, the Israeli Air Force was granted permission to use an airport in Nairobi. Ugandan President Idi Amin later ordered McKenzie's assassination. Mossad Chief Director Meir Amit had a forest planted in Israel in McKenzie's name.

In 1979, Abdalla Mwidau, the representative of Mombasa-South in the Kenyan parliament, conducted an information campaign among Muslims in the US, in which he praised Israel's assistance to developing African countries and specifically its assistance to Muslim education in Kenya. His political rivals, led by Sharif Kassir, denounced these activities, calling Mwidau a "Zionist agent".

=== 1987–2001 ===
Renewed diplomatic ties were discussed in 1987 with the Kenyan President Daniel arap Moi by Israeli Prime Minister Yitzhak Shamir, and were re-initiated in 1988. In 1989 Israeli Foreign Minister Moshe Arens visited Kenya to sign a cooperation pact.

The Kibwezi irrigation project of 1991 was a joint effort between the two countries. In 1996 it consisted of 40 hectares of experimental irrigation farm in the Yatta plateau.

In 1993, Kenya and Israel re-established the diplomatic relations between the countries.

=== 2002–present ===
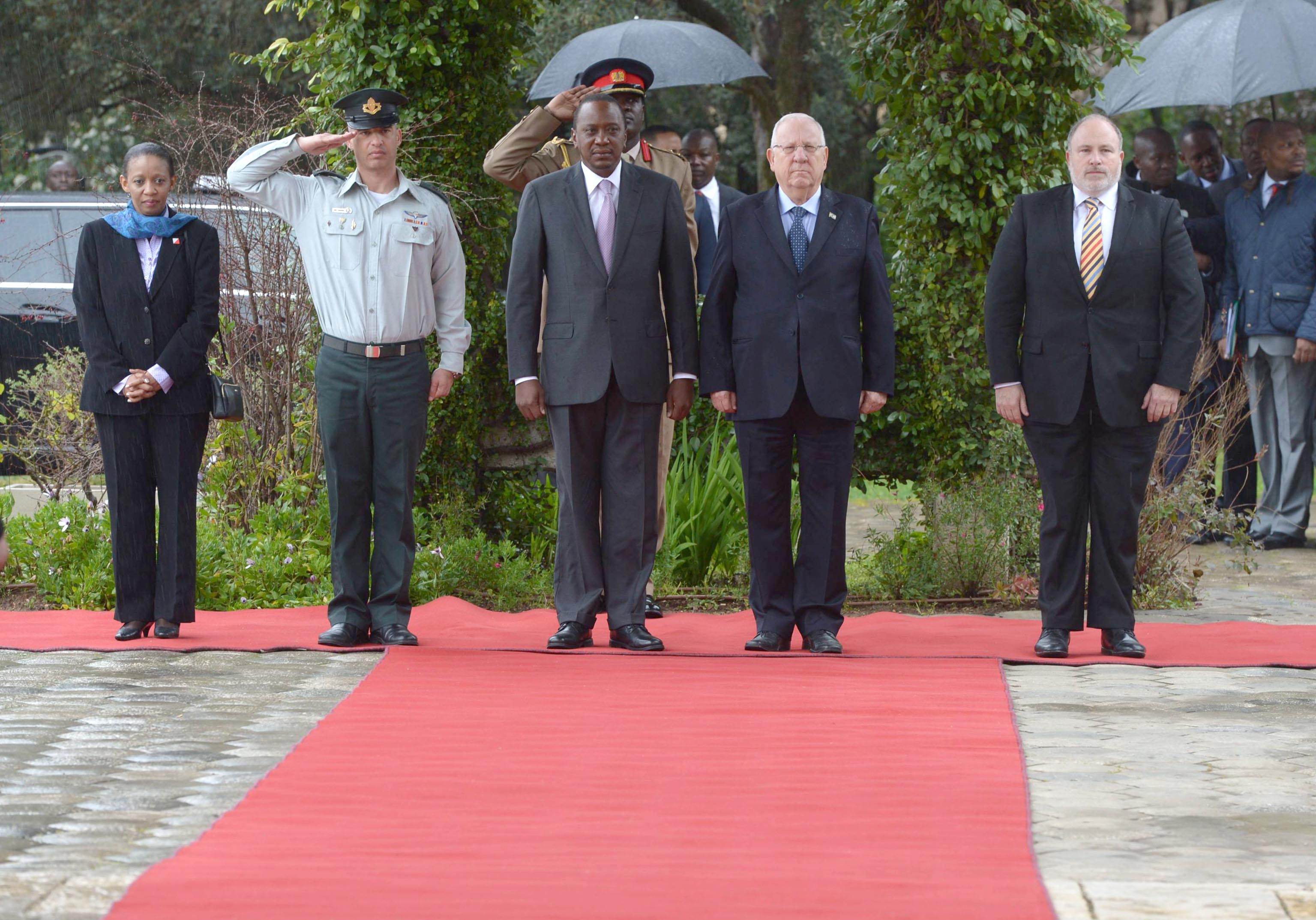
Uhuru Kenyatta in Israel with the president of Israel Reuven Rivlin, February 2016

During the 2002 Mombasa attacks, suicide-bomber terrorists struck the entrance of the Israeli-owned Paradise Hotel. Fifteen people were killed, three of them Israelis, when a car bomb exploded outside the lobby of the hotel. Terrorists also fired two hand-held rockets at an Israeli airliner, which had just lifted off from Moi International Airport in Mombasa with 264 passengers on board. Israel then evacuated its citizens from Kenya.

In 2003, Kenya requested Israel's help in developing a national solar energy strategy. Roads, Public Works and Housing Minister Raila Odinga said: "Israel has a Solar Energy Standards Committee dealing with the setting up of solar energy equipment around the world and we need their help in setting up such equipment in Kenya." While speaking during an audience with the new Israeli Ambassador to Kenya, Emmanuel Seri, Raila also reiterated the need to enhance the existing economic ties between the two countries and asked Israel to provide more development aid and to help Kenya draw up and execute an effective national disaster management scheme. Seri told the Kenyan minister that his government intended to enhance the existing economic ties, saying "[w]e want to enhance our trade relations with Kenya so that more Kenyans can visit Israel and do business."

In 2006, Israel sent a search-and-rescue team to Kenya when a building collapsed. Eighty disaster and medical relief people left Tel Aviv for Nairobi, where people were trapped in rubble when a multistory building collapsed.

Following the Kenyan presidential election, 2007, there was rioting, and Israel came to the aid of Kenyans by donating medicine to the Moi Teaching and Referral Hospital in Eldoret.

In 2010, Kenya began seeking the purchase of Israeli weapons, likely to include counterinsurgency systems and unmanned aerial vehicles for border surveillance. In 2011, the two countries signed a treaty to cooperate in fighting against terrorism, money laundering, and other crime.

In 2013, Israel sent troops to give assistance to Kenyan forces fighting Somali Islamist terrorists who attacked the Westgate shopping mall in Nairobi. Israeli agencies helped Kenya investigate the attack, which killed at least 72 people.

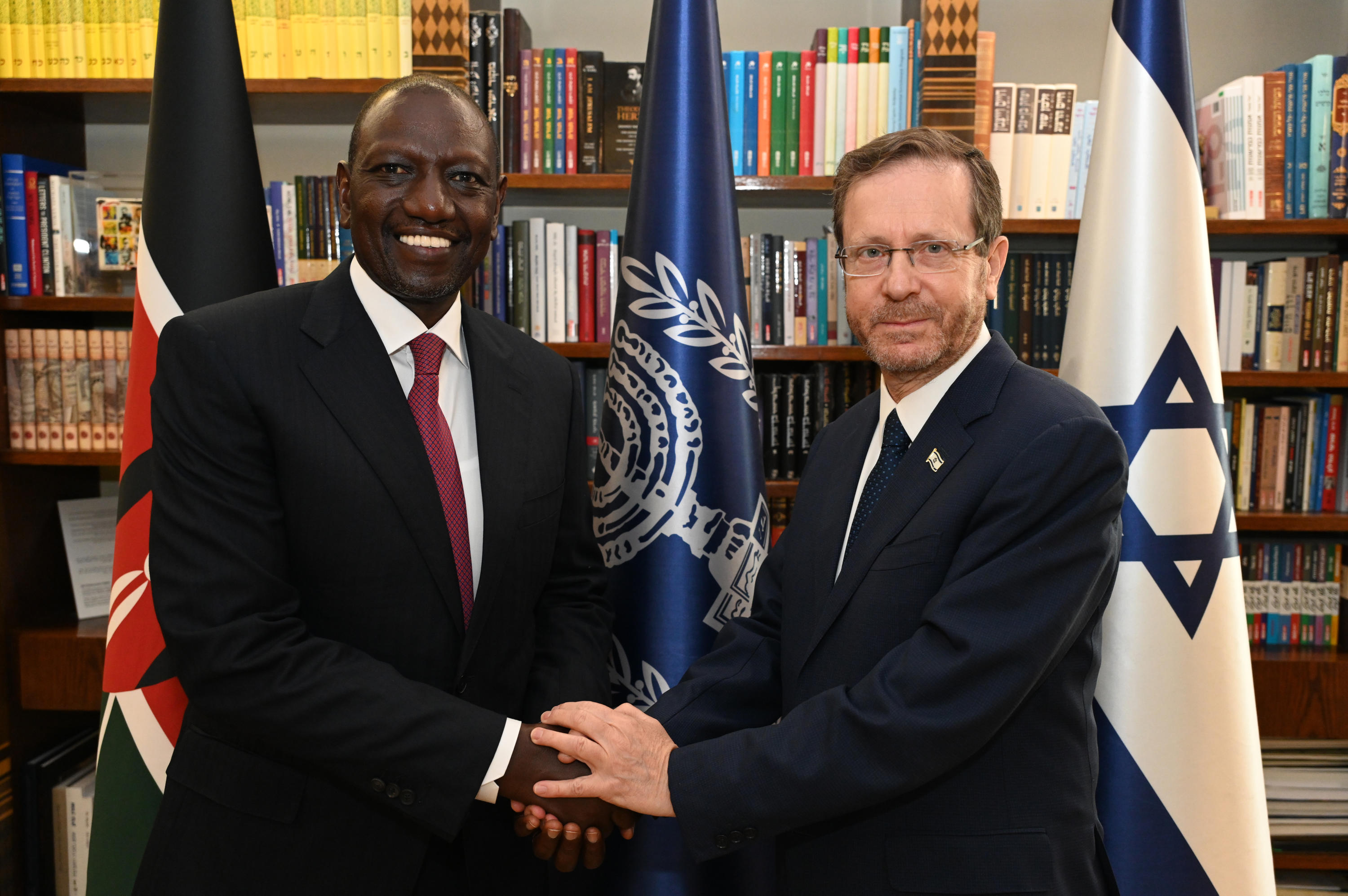
Kenyan President William Ruto with Israeli President Isaac Herzog on 9 May 2023

During the Gaza war, Kenya sent 1,500 workers to work on Israel farms, with contracts renewable up to three years. They are being paid $1,500 per month USD. The move comes as Israel faced a labor shortage due to the war and Kenya faces an unemployment crisis. This follows Malawi's move of sending 220 Malawians to work on Israeli farms. Kenyans have raised concerns about worker safety and sanitation, however Israel promises fair treatment of workers.

In February 2026, Kenya and Israel reaffirmed their strategic partnership during high-level talks in Nairobi focused on the "innovation corridor" between Tel Aviv and East Africa. Prime Cabinet Secretary Musalia Mudavadi and Israeli Ambassador Gideon Behar discussed deepening cooperation in geothermal energy, climate action, and food security. Mudavadi specifically invited Israeli investment into Kenya's geothermal sector to support the country's goal of attaining 100% renewable energy by 2030.

== Trade relations ==
Between 1970 and 1973, Israeli exports to Kenya were in the range of $2.8–4.2 million. Kenyan exports to Israel over the same period were in the range of $1.0–1.7 million. By 2011, according to figures released by Kenyan trade minister Ali Mwakwere, trade between the two nations had grown to $150 million, with Israel exporting finished goods such as agricultural machinery, irrigation equipment and medicine to Kenya and Kenya exporting primary products such as food products and materials to Israel. Trade between the two countries was $139 million in 2012, 8.0 percent of Israel's trade with Africa.

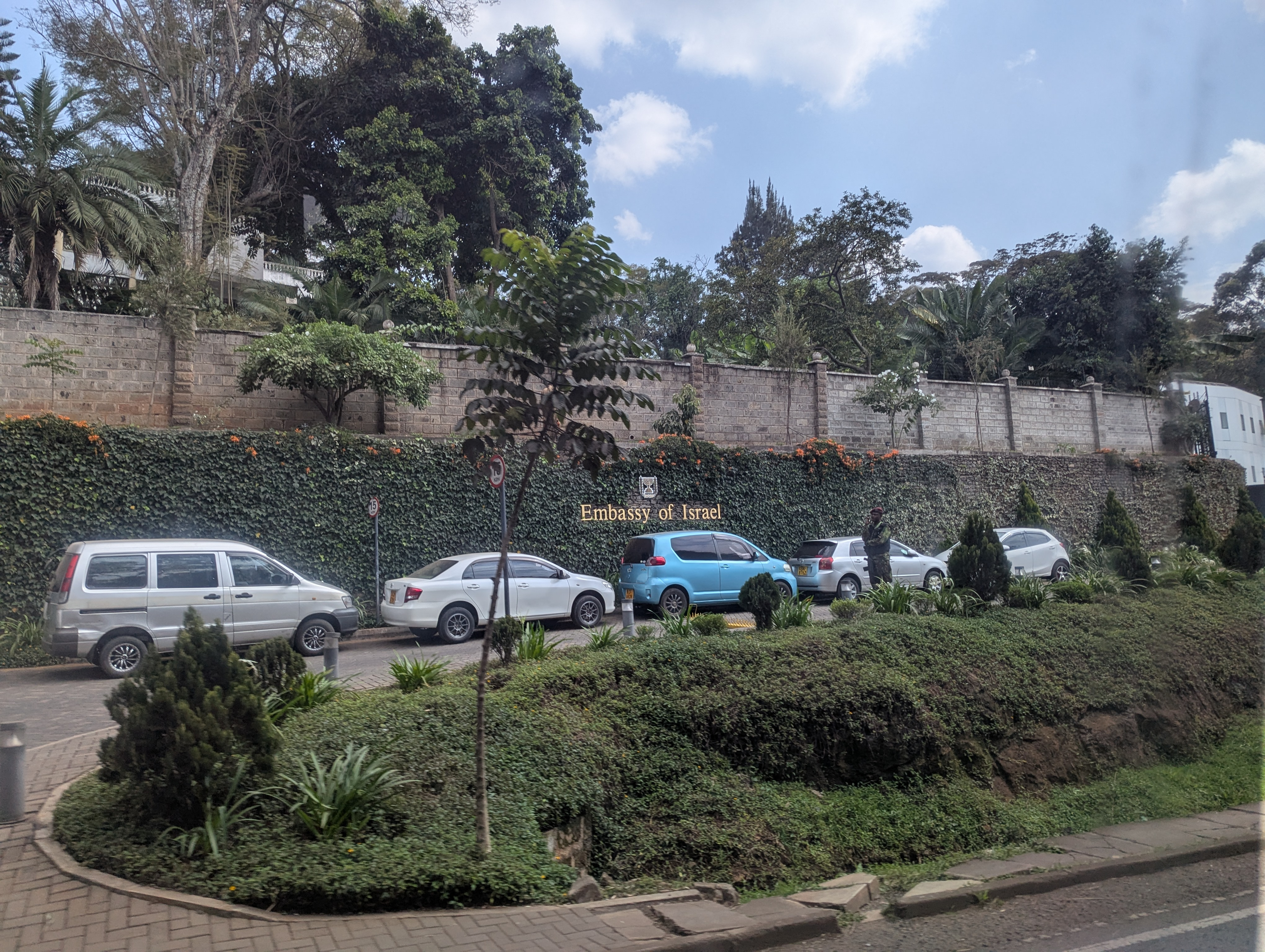
Embassy of Israel in Nairobi

== Resident diplomatic missions ==
- Israel has an embassy in Nairobi.
- Kenya has an embassy in Tel Aviv.

== See also ==
- African Jews
- History of the Jews in Kenya
- International recognition of Israel
- Israel Somen
