= Outline of Kenya =

Country in East Africa

The Flag of Kenya

The Coat of arms of Kenya

The location of Kenya

An enlargeable relief map of Kenya

The following outline is provided as an overview of and topical guide to Kenya:

Kenya is a country in East Africa. The capital city is Nairobi, 2nd largest in Africa (after Cairo). Kenya spans an area about 85% the size of France or Texas. The population has grown rapidly in recent decades to roughly 38 million. Kenya has numerous wildlife reserves, containing thousands of animal species. The country is named after Mount Kenya, a significant landmark and the second among the highest mountain peaks of Africa, and both were originally usually pronounced /ˈkiːnjə/ in English, though the native pronunciation and the one intended by the original transcription Kenia was [ˈkɛnja]. During the presidency of Jomo Kenyatta in the 1960s, the current English pronunciation of /ˈkɛnjə/ became widespread because his name retained the native pronunciation. Before 1920, the area now known as Kenya was known as the British East Africa Protectorate and so there was no need to mention mount when referring to the mountain.

== General reference ==
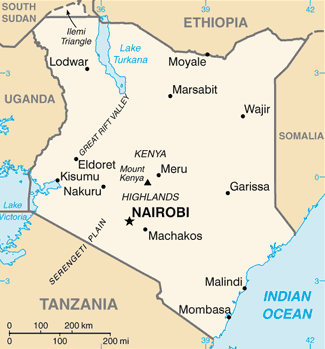
An enlargeable basic map of Kenya

- Pronunciation: /ˈkɛnjə/ or /ˈkiːnjə/
- Common English country name: Kenya
- Official English country name: The Republic of Kenya
- Common endonym(s):
- Official endonym(s):
- Adjectival(s): Kenyan
- Demonym(s): Kenyan(s)
- International rankings of Kenya
- ISO country codes: KE, KEN, 404
- ISO region codes: See ISO 3166-2:KE
- Internet country code top-level domain: .ke

== Geography of Kenya ==
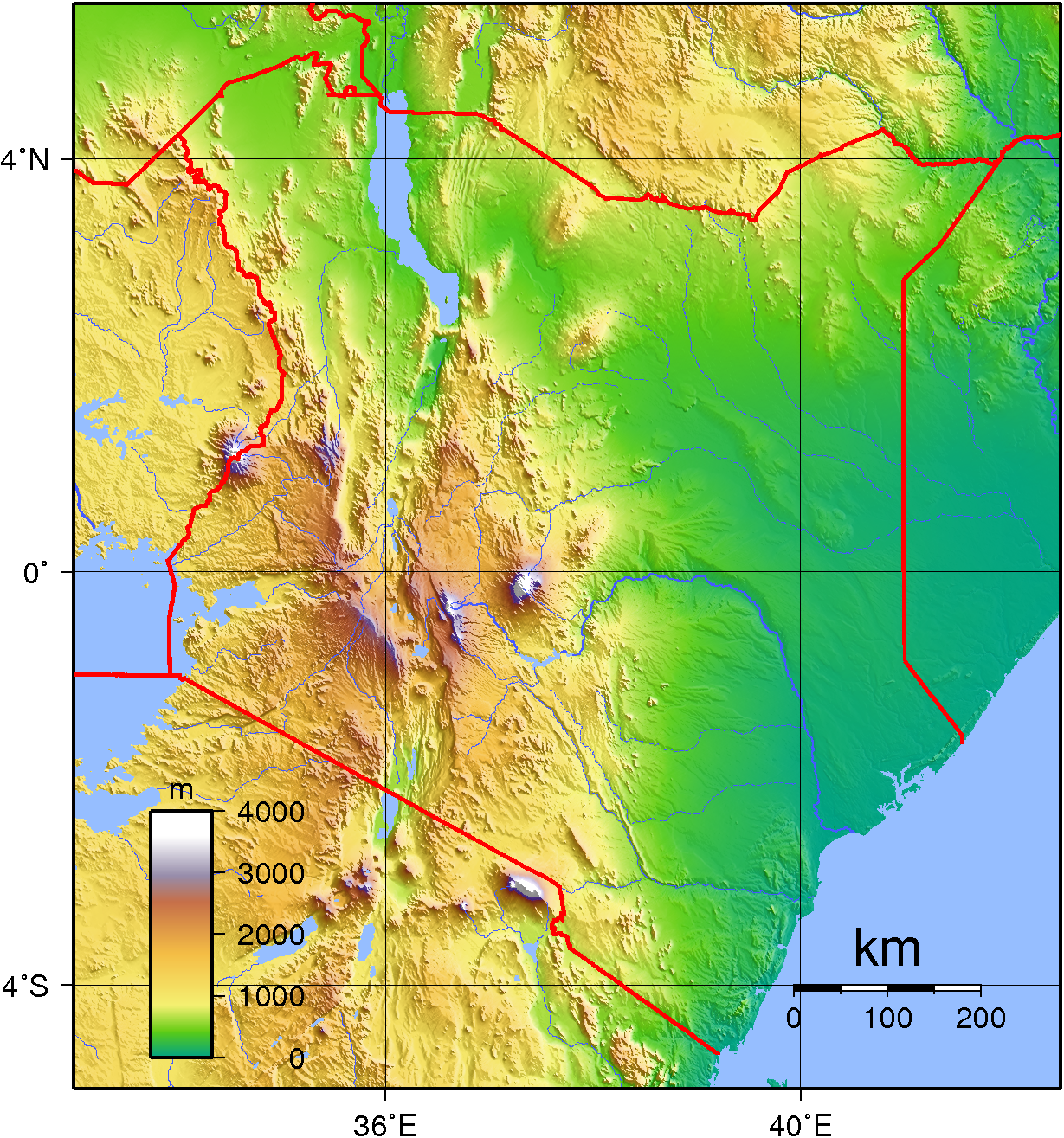
An enlargeable topographic map of Kenya

Geography of Kenya

- Kenya is: a country
- Location:
  - Eastern Hemisphere, on the Equator
    - Africa
      - East Africa
  - Time zone(s):
  - Land boundaries: 3,477 km

Uganda 933 km
Ethiopia 861 km
Tanzania 769 km
Somalia 682 km
South Sudan 232 km

- Coastline: Indian Ocean 536 km

- Population of Kenya: 37,538,000 – 28th most populous country
- Area of Kenya: 580,367 km^{2}
- Atlas of Kenya

=== Environment of Kenya ===
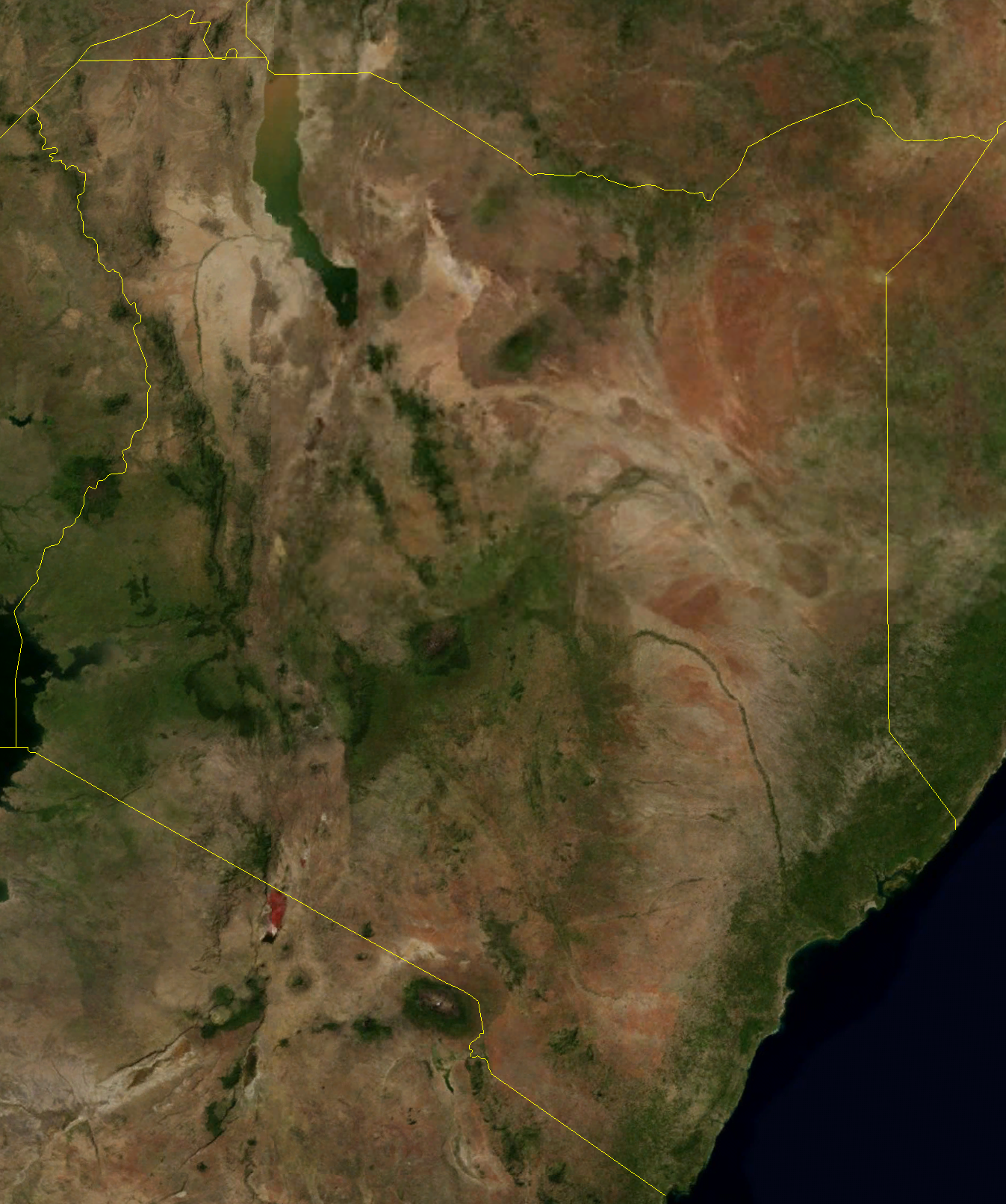
An enlargeable satellite image of Kenya

Environment of Kenya

- Climate of Kenya
- Ecology of Kenya
  - Ecoregions in Kenya
  - Renewable energy in Kenya
- Protected areas of Kenya
  - Biosphere reserves in Kenya
  - National parks of Kenya
- Wildlife of Kenya
  - Fauna of Kenya
    - Birds of Kenya
    - Mammals of Kenya

==== Natural geographic features of Kenya ====
- Glaciers of Kenya
- Lakes of Kenya
- Mountains of Kenya
  - Volcanoes in Kenya
- Rivers of Kenya
- World Heritage Sites in Kenya

=== Regions of Kenya ===
Regions of Kenya

==== Ecoregions of Kenya ====
List of ecoregions in Kenya

- Ecoregions in Kenya

==== Administrative divisions of Kenya ====
Administrative divisions of Kenya

- Counties of Kenya

===== Counties of Kenya =====
Counties of Kenya Kenya is divided into 47 Counties

Code	County	Former Province	Area (km^{2})	Population Census 2009	Capital
1	Mombasa	Coast	212.5	939,370	Mombasa (City)
2	Kwale	Coast	8,270.3	649,931	Kwale
3	Kilifi	Coast	12,245.9	1,109,735	Kilifi
4	Tana River	Coast	35,375.8	240,075	Hola
5	Lamu	Coast	6,497.7	101,539	Lamu
6	Taita-Taveta	Coast	17,083.9	284,657	Voi
7	Garissa	North Eastern	45,720.2	623,060	Garissa
8	Wajir	North Eastern	55,840.6	661,941	Wajir
9	Mandera	North Eastern	25,797.7	1,025,756	Mandera
10	Marsabit	Eastern	66,923.1	291,166	Marsabit
11	Isiolo	Eastern	25,336.1	143,294	Isiolo
12	Meru	Eastern	5,127.1	1,356,301	Meru
13	Tharaka-Nithi	Eastern	2,409.5	365,330	Chuka
14	Embu	Eastern	2,555.9	516,212	Embu
15	Kitui	Eastern	24,385.1	1,012,709	Kitui
16	Machakos	Eastern	5,952.9	1,098,584	Machakos
17	Makueni	Eastern	8,008.9	884,527	Wote
18	Nyandarua	Central	3,107.7	596,268	Ol Kalou
19	Nyeri	Central	2,361.0	693,558	Nyeri
20	Kirinyaga	Central	1,205.4	528,054	Kerugoya / Kutus
21	Murang'a	Central	2,325.8	942,581	Murang'a
22	Kiambu	Central	2,449.2	1,623,282	Kiambu
23	Turkana	Rift Valley	71,597.8	855,399	Lodwar
24	West Pokot	Rift Valley	8,418.2	512,690	Kapenguria
25	Samburu	Rift Valley	20,182.5	223,947	Maralal
26	Trans Nzoia	Rift Valley	2,469.9	818,757	Kitale
27	Uasin Gishu	Rift Valley	2,955.3	894,179	Eldoret
28	Elgeyo-Marakwet	Rift Valley	3,049.7	369,998	Iten
29	Nandi	Rift Valley	2,884.5	752,965	Kapsabet
30	Baringo	Rift Valley	11,075.3	555,561	Kabarnet
31	Laikipia	Rift Valley	8,696.1	399,227	Nanyuki
32	Nakuru	Rift Valley	7,509.5	1,603,325	Nakuru
33	Narok	Rift Valley	17,921.2	850,920	Narok
34	Kajiado	Rift Valley	21,292.7	687,312	Kajiado
35	Kericho	Rift Valley	2,454.5	752,396	Kericho
36	Bomet	Rift Valley	1,997.9	730,129	Bomet
37	Kakamega	Western	3,033.8	1,660,651	Kakamega
38	Vihiga	Western	531.3	554,622	Vihiga
39	Bungoma	Western	2,206.9	1,375,063	Bungoma
40	Busia	Western	1,628.4	743,946	Busia
41	Siaya	Nyanza	2,496.1	842,304	Siaya
42	Kisumu	Nyanza	2,009.5	968,909	Kisumu
43	Homa Bay	Nyanza	3,154.7	963,794	Homa Bay
44	Migori	Nyanza	2,586.4	917,170	Migori
45	Kisii	Nyanza	1,317.9	1,152,282	Kisii
46	Nyamira	Nyanza	912.5	598,252	Nyamira
47	Nairobi	Nairobi	694.9	3,138,369	Nairobi (City)
	Totals		581,309.0	38,610,097	Nairobi

Map of counties

===== Municipalities of Kenya =====
List of cities in Kenya

- Capital of Kenya: Nairobi

Major towns:

- Baragoi
- Bungoma
- Busia
- Dadaab
- Diani Beach
- Eldoret
- Embu
- Garissa
- Gede
- Hola
- Homa Bay
- Isiolo
- Kajiado
- Kakamega
- Kakuma
- Kapenguria
- Kericho
- Kiambu
- Kilifi
- Kisii
- Kisumu
- Kitale
- Lamu
- Langata
- Lodwar
- Lokichoggio
- Loyangalani
- Machakos
- Malindi
- Mandera
- Maralal
- Marsabit
- Meru
- Mombasa
- Moyale
- Mumia's
- Muranga (previous name Fort Hall)
- Nairobi
- Naivasha
- Nakuru
- Namanga
- Nanyuki
- Narok
- Naro Moru
- Nyahururu
- Nyeri
- Ruiru
- Shimoni
- Takaungu
- Thika
- Voi
- Wajir
- Watamu
- Webuye
- Wundanyi

Some smaller towns:

- Karen
- Kilima Mbogo
- Nakuru
- Ngong

=== Demography of Kenya ===
Demographics of Kenya

== Government and politics of Kenya ==
Politics of Kenya

- Form of government:
- Capital of Kenya: Nairobi
- Elections in Kenya
- Political parties in Kenya

=== Branches of the government of Kenya ===
Government of Kenya

==== Executive arm of the government of Kenya ====
- Head of State: President of Kenya, William Ruto
- Cabinet of Kenya

==== Legislative branch of the government of Kenya ====
- Parliament of Kenya (bicameral)
  - Senate (upper house)
  - The National Assembly (lower house)

==== Judicial branch of the government of Kenya ====
Court system of Kenya

- Supreme Court of Kenya

=== Foreign relations of Kenya ===
Foreign relations of Kenya

- Diplomatic missions in Kenya
- Diplomatic missions of Kenya

==== International organisation membership ====
International organization membership of Kenya Kenya is a member of: The Republic of Kenya is a member of:

- African, Caribbean, and Pacific Group of States (ACP)
- African Development Bank Group (AfDB)
- African Union (AU)
- African Union/United Nations Hybrid operation in Darfur (UNAMID)
- Common Market for Eastern and Southern Africa (COMESA)
- Commonwealth of Nations
- East African Community (EAC)
- East African Development Bank (EADB)
- Food and Agriculture Organization (FAO)
- Group of 15 (G15)
- Group of 77 (G77)
- Inter-Governmental Authority on Development (IGAD)
- International Atomic Energy Agency (IAEA)
- International Bank for Reconstruction and Development (IBRD)
- International Civil Aviation Organization (ICAO)
- International Criminal Court (ICCt)
- International Criminal Police Organization (Interpol)
- International Development Association (IDA)
- International Federation of Red Cross and Red Crescent Societies (IFRCS)
- International Finance Corporation (IFC)
- International Fund for Agricultural Development (IFAD)
- International Labour Organization (ILO)
- International Maritime Organization (IMO)
- International Mobile Satellite Organization (IMSO)
- International Monetary Fund (IMF)
- International Olympic Committee (IOC)
- International Organization for Migration (IOM)
- International Organization for Standardization (ISO)

- International Red Cross and Red Crescent Movement (ICRM)
- International Telecommunication Union (ITU)
- International Telecommunications Satellite Organization (ITSO)
- International Trade Union Confederation (ITUC)
- Inter-Parliamentary Union (IPU)
- Multilateral Investment Guarantee Agency (MIGA)
- Nonaligned Movement (NAM)
- Organisation for the Prohibition of Chemical Weapons (OPCW)
- Permanent Court of Arbitration (PCA)
- United Nations (UN)
- United Nations Conference on Trade and Development (UNCTAD)
- United Nations Educational, Scientific, and Cultural Organization (UNESCO)
- United Nations High Commissioner for Refugees (UNHCR)
- United Nations Industrial Development Organization (UNIDO)
- United Nations Mission for the Referendum in Western Sahara (MINURSO)
- United Nations Mission in Liberia (UNMIL)
- United Nations Mission in the Sudan (UNMIS)
- United Nations Operation in Cote d'Ivoire (UNOCI)
- United Nations Organization Mission in the Democratic Republic of the Congo (MONUC)
- Universal Postal Union (UPU)
- World Customs Organization (WCO)
- World Federation of Trade Unions (WFTU)
- World Health Organization (WHO)
- World Intellectual Property Organization (WIPO)
- World Meteorological Organization (WMO)
- World Tourism Organization (UNWTO)
- World Trade Organization (WTO)

=== Law and order in Kenya ===
Law of Kenya

- Constitution of Kenya
- Crime in Kenya
- Human rights in Kenya
  - LGBT rights in Kenya
- Law enforcement in Kenya

=== Military of Kenya ===
Military of Kenya

- Command
  - Commander-in-chief:
- Forces
  - Army of Kenya
  - Navy of Kenya
  - Air Force of Kenya

=== Local government in Kenya ===
Local government in Kenya

== History of Kenya ==
History of Kenya

- Current events of Kenya
- Military history of Kenya
- Related: Arab slave trade

== Culture of Kenya ==
Culture of Kenya

- Cuisine of Kenya
- Languages of Kenya
- Media in Kenya
- National symbols of Kenya
  - Coat of arms of Kenya
  - Flag of Kenya
  - National anthem of Kenya
- Prostitution in Kenya
- Public holidays in Kenya
- Religion in Kenya
  - Christianity in Kenya
  - Hinduism in Kenya
  - Islam in Kenya
- World Heritage Sites in Kenya
  - Lamu
  - Lake Turkana National Parks
  - Sacred Mijikenda Kaya Forests

=== The arts in Kenya ===
- Cinema of Kenya
- Literature of Kenya
- Music of Kenya
- Video gaming in Kenya

=== Sports in Kenya ===
Sports in Kenya

- Football in Kenya
- Kenya at the Olympics

== Economy and infrastructure of Kenya ==
Economy of Kenya

- Economic rank, by nominal GDP (2025): 62nd (sixty-second)
- Agriculture in Kenya
  - Poultry farming in Kenya
- Banking in Kenya
  - National Bank of Kenya
  - Kenya Commercial Bank
- Communications in Kenya
  - Internet in Kenya
- Companies of Kenya
- Currency of Kenya: Shilling
  - ISO 4217: KES
- Energy in Kenya
- Health care in Kenya
- Mining in Kenya
- Kenya Stock Exchange
  - Nairobi Stock Exchange
- Tourism in Kenya
  - Shopping malls in Kenya
  - Hypermarkets in Kenya
- Transport in Kenya
- List of airlines in Kenya
  - Air transport in Kenya
    - Airports in Kenya
    - Kenya Airways
  - Rail transport in Kenya
  - Roads in Kenya
- Water supply and sanitation in Kenya

== Education in Kenya ==
Education in Kenya

== Health in Kenya ==
Health in Kenya

== See also ==
Kenya

- List of international rankings
- List of Kenya-related topics
- Member state of the Commonwealth of Nations
- Member state of the United Nations
- Outline of Africa
- Outline of geography
