= List of ecoregions in Kenya =

The following is a list of ecoregions in Kenya, as identified by the Worldwide Fund for Nature (WWF).

== Terrestrial ecoregions ==
by major habitat type

=== Tropical and subtropical moist broadleaf forests ===
- East African montane forests
- Eastern Arc forests
- Northern Zanzibar–Inhambane coastal forest mosaic

=== Tropical and subtropical grasslands, savannas, and shrublands ===
- East Sudanian savanna
- Northern Acacia–Commiphora bushlands and thickets
- Somali Acacia–Commiphora bushlands and thickets
- Southern Acacia–Commiphora bushlands and thickets
- Victoria Basin forest–savanna mosaic

=== Flooded grasslands and savannas ===
- East African halophytics

=== Montane grasslands and shrublands ===
- East African montane moorlands

=== Deserts and xeric shrublands ===
- Masai xeric grasslands and shrublands

=== Mangroves ===
- East African mangroves

== Freshwater ecoregions ==
by bioregion

=== Nilo-Sudan ===
- Shebele-Juba Catchments
- Lake Turkana

=== Great Lakes ===
- Lakes Kivu, Edward, George, and Victoria

=== Eastern and Coastal ===
- Kenyan Coastal Rivers
- Pangani
- Southern Eastern Rift

== Marine ecoregions ==
- East African Coral Coast

== See also ==
- Environment of Kenya
