= List of diplomatic missions of Kenya =

This is a list of diplomatic missions of Kenya.

Honorary consulates and trade missions are excluded from this listing.

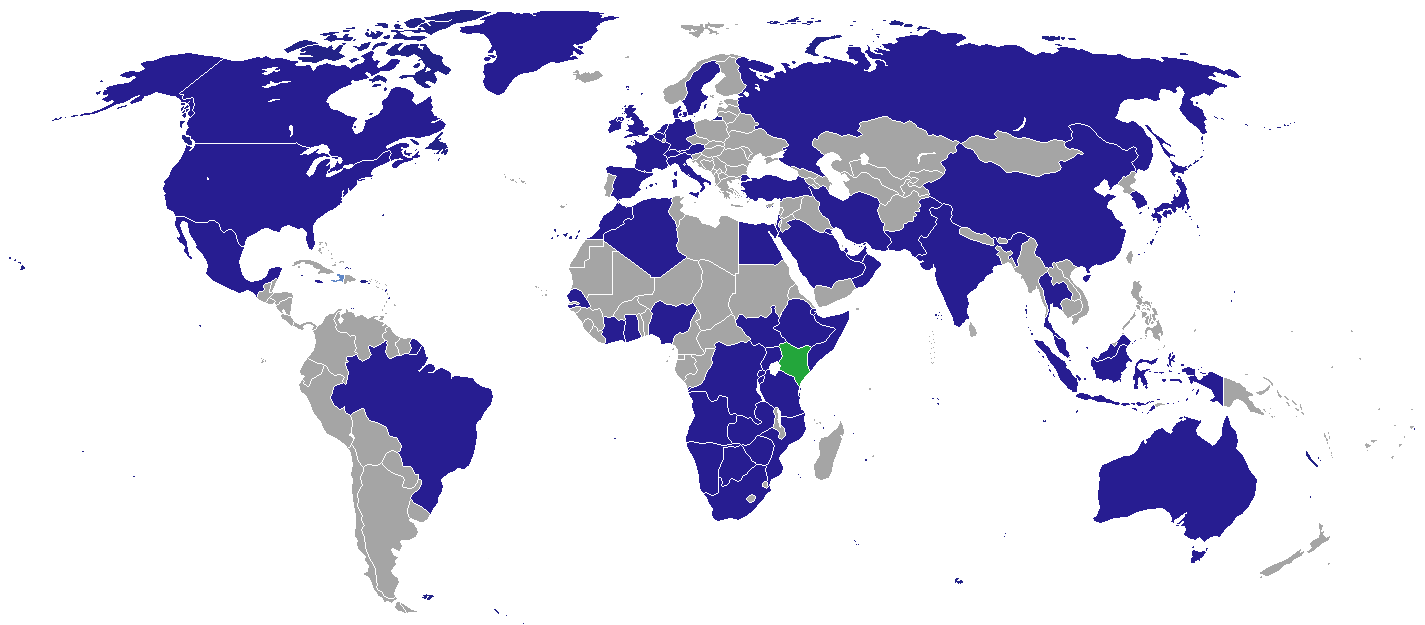
Diplomatic missions of Kenya

== Current missions ==
=== Africa ===
Host country	Host city	Mission	Concurrent accreditation	Ref.
Algeria	Algiers	Embassy	Countries: Libya; Niger; Sahrawi Republic; Tunisia	
Angola	Luanda	Embassy		
Botswana	Gaborone	High Commission	Multilateral Organizations: Southern African Development Community (Note: Accredited as an observer mission.)	
Burundi	Bujumbura	Embassy		
Congo-Kinshasa	Kinshasa	Embassy	Countries: Central African Republic; Congo-Brazzaville; Gabon	
Congo-Kinshasa	Goma	Consulate-General	Countries: Central African Republic; Congo-Brazzaville; Gabon	
Djibouti	Djibouti City	Embassy	Multilateral Organizations: Intergovernmental Authority on Development	
Egypt	Cairo	Embassy	Countries: Eritrea; Jordan; Palestine	
Ethiopia	Addis Ababa	Embassy	Multilateral Organizations: African Union; United Nations Economic Commission for Africa	
Ghana	Accra	High Commission	Countries: Burkina Faso	
Ivory Coast	Abidjan	Embassy		
Morocco	Rabat	Embassy		
Mozambique	Maputo	High Commission		
Namibia	Windhoek	High Commission		
Nigeria	Abuja	High Commission	Countries: Benin; Cameroon; Equatorial Guinea; Guinea; Liberia; Sierra Leone; Togo	
Rwanda	Kigali	High Commission		
Senegal	Dakar	Embassy	Countries: Gambia; Guinea-Bissau; Mali	
South Africa	Pretoria	High Commission	Countries: Eswatini; Lesotho	
Somalia	Mogadishu	Embassy		
Somaliland (Note: Kenya does not recognize the unilaterally-declared independence of Somaliland, and has formal diplomatic relations with Somalia. Nonetheless, Kenya and Somaliland conduct informal relations through liaison offices in each other's capitals.)	Hargeisa	Liaison office		
South Sudan	Juba	Embassy		
Tanzania	Dar es Salaam	High Commission	Countries: Comoros; Mauritius; Seychelles	
Tanzania	Arusha	Consulate-General	Countries: Comoros; Mauritius; Seychelles	
Uganda	Kampala	High Commission		
Zambia	Lusaka	High Commission	Countries: Malawi; Multilateral Organizations: Common Market for Eastern and Southern Africa	
Zimbabwe	Harare	Embassy		

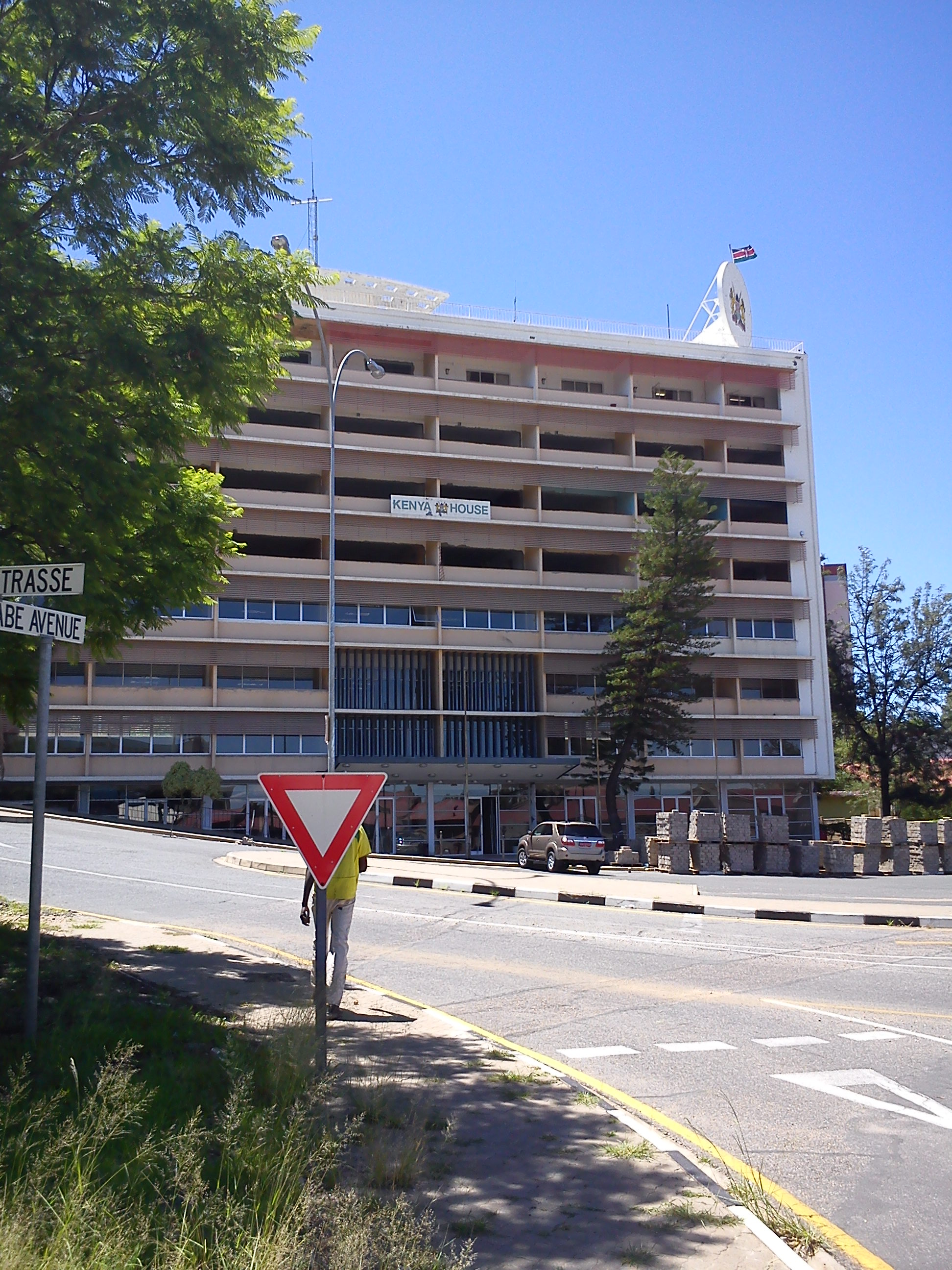
High Commission in Windhoek

=== Americas ===
Host country	Host city	Mission	Concurrent accreditation	Ref.
Brazil	Brasília	Embassy	Countries: Argentina; Bolivia; Chile; Paraguay; Peru; Uruguay	
Canada	Ottawa	High Commission	Multilateral Organizations: International Civil Aviation Organization	
Jamaica	Kingston	High Commission	Countries: Bahamas; Barbados; Colombia; Cuba; Dominican Republic; Ecuador; Guyana; Haiti; Panama; Saint Kitts and Nevis; Saint Vincent and the Grenadines; Trinidad and Tobago; Venezuela; Multilateral Organizations: Caribbean Community	
Mexico	Mexico City	Embassy		
United States	Washington, D.C.	Embassy	Countries: Costa Rica; El Salvador; Honduras; Nicaragua; Multilateral Organizations: Organization of American States (Note: Accredited as an observer mission.)	
United States	Los Angeles	Consulate-General	Countries: Costa Rica; El Salvador; Honduras; Nicaragua; Multilateral Organizations: Organization of American States	
United States	New York City	Consulate-General	Countries: Costa Rica; El Salvador; Honduras; Nicaragua; Multilateral Organizations: Organization of American States	

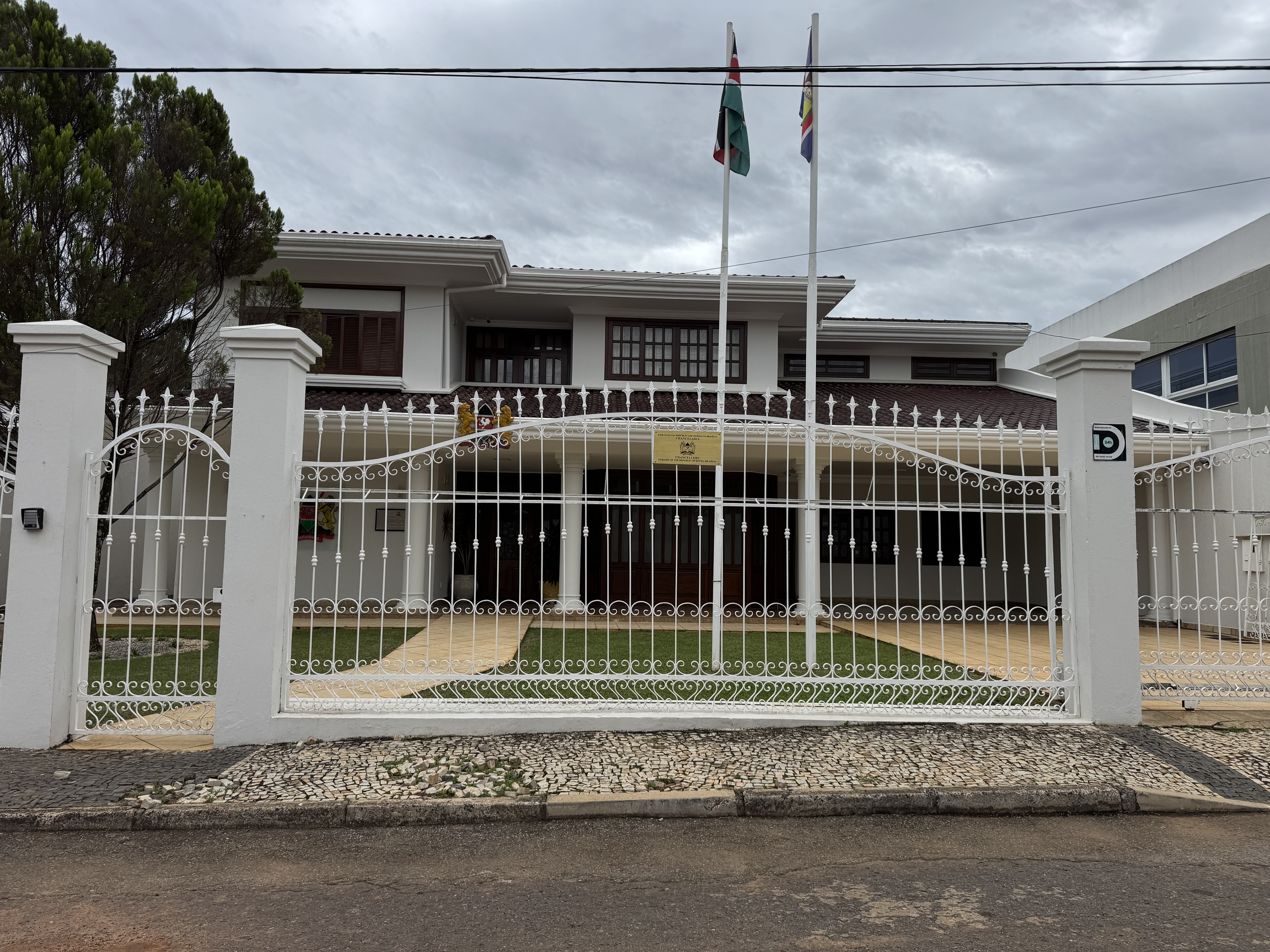
Embassy in Brasília

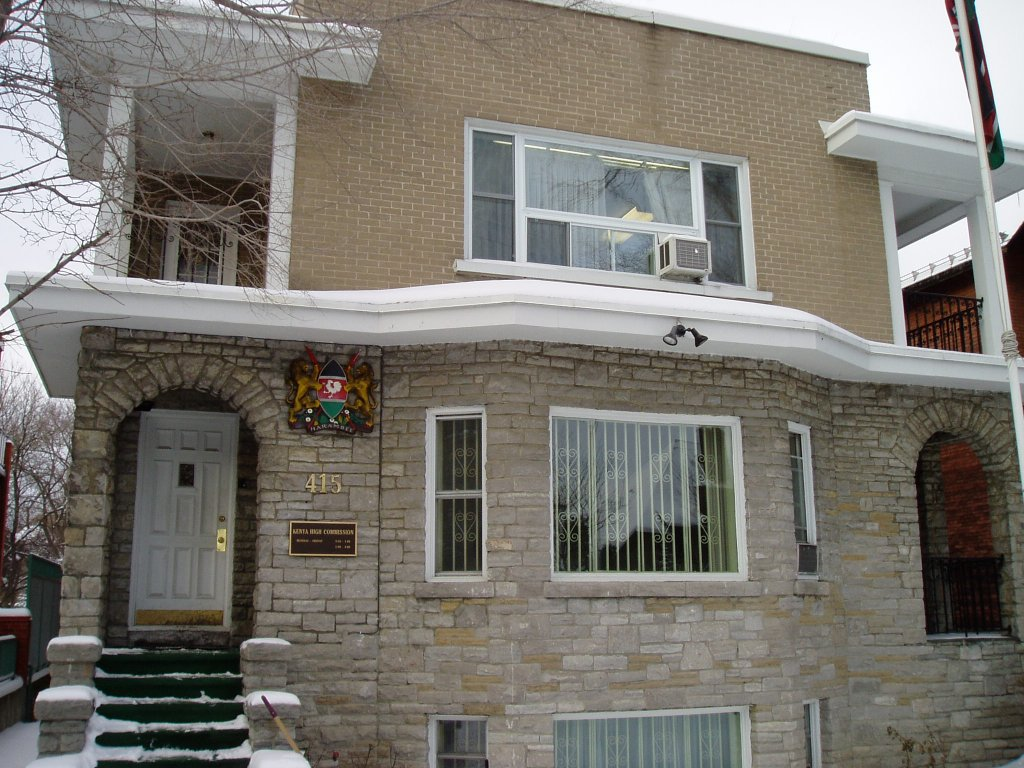
High Commission in Ottawa

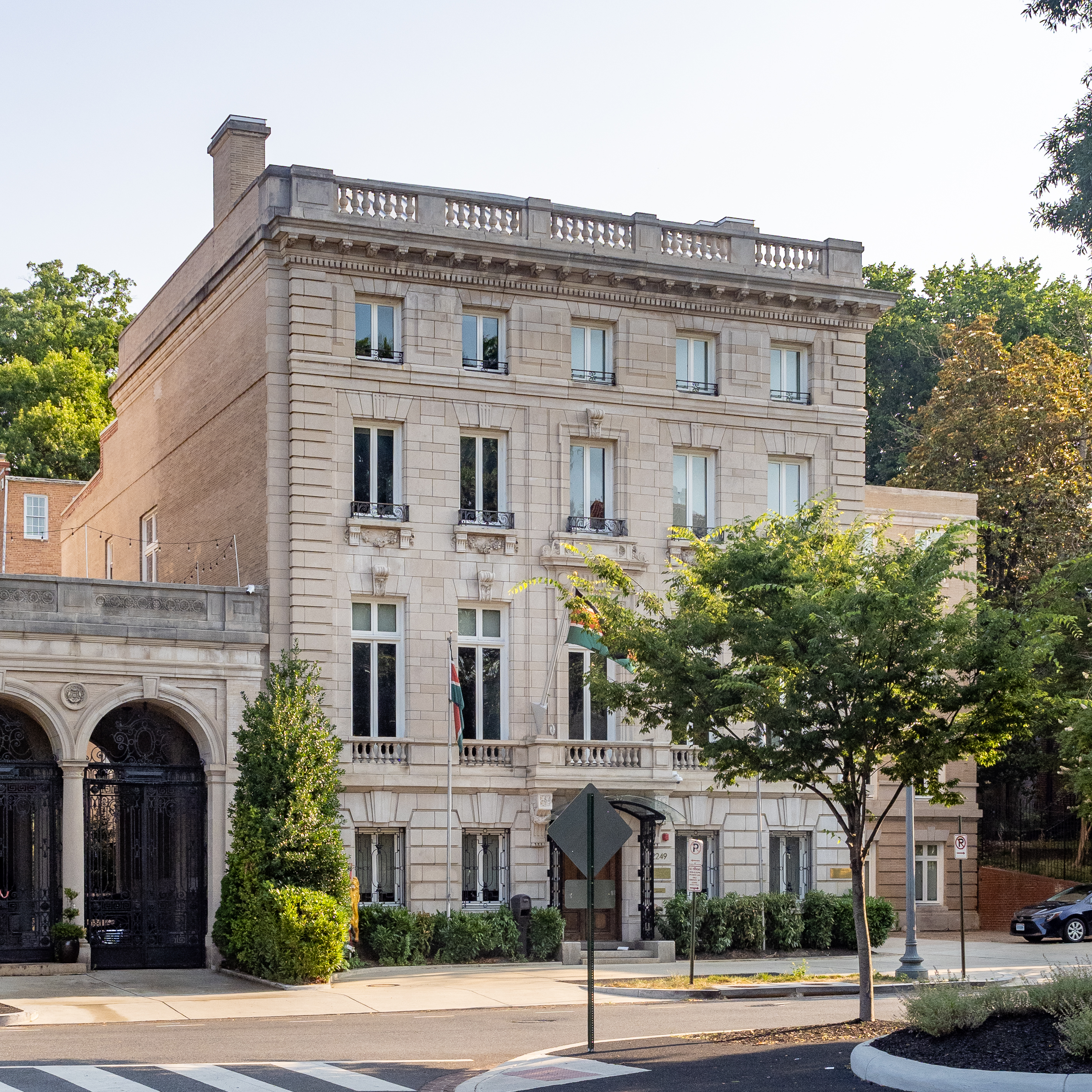
Embassy in Washington, D.C.

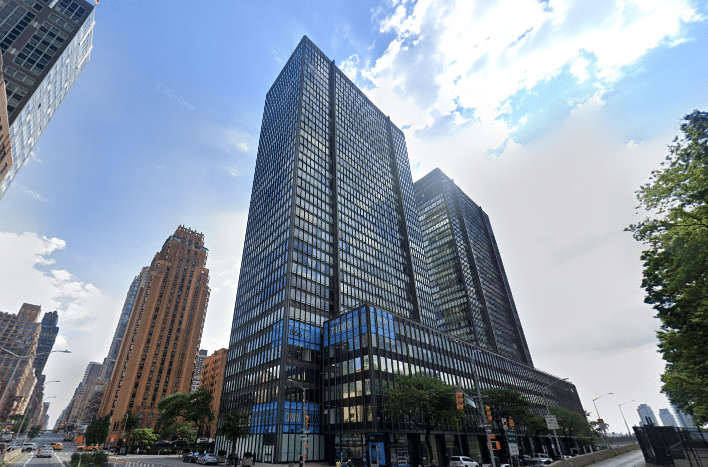
Building hosting the Consulate-General in New York City

=== Asia ===
Host country	Host city	Mission	Concurrent accreditation	Ref.
China	Beijing	Embassy	Countries: Mongolia	
China	Guangzhou	Consulate-General	Countries: Mongolia	
India	New Delhi	High Commission	Countries: Bangladesh; Maldives; Nepal; Sri Lanka; Consular jurisdiction only: Bhutan (Note: Bhutan is listed only under the consular jurisdiction of the Kenyan High Commission in New Delhi. As of 2025, the two countries have yet to establish formal diplomatic relations.)	
Indonesia	Jakarta	Embassy	Countries: Philippines; Singapore; Multilateral Organizations: Association of Southeast Asian Nations	
Iran	Tehran	Embassy	Countries: Azerbaijan; Turkmenistan; Uzbekistan	
Israel	Tel Aviv	Embassy		
Japan	Tokyo	Embassy		
Kuwait	Kuwait City	Embassy	Countries: Bahrain; Lebanon	
Malaysia	Kuala Lumpur	High Commission	Countries: Brunei	
Oman	Muscat	Embassy		
Pakistan	Islamabad	High Commission		
Qatar	Doha	Embassy		
Saudi Arabia	Riyadh	Embassy	Countries: Iraq; Yemen	
Saudi Arabia	Jeddah	Consulate-General	Countries: Iraq; Yemen	
South Korea	Seoul	Embassy		
Thailand	Bangkok	Embassy	Countries: Cambodia; Laos; Myanmar; Vietnam	
Turkey	Ankara	Embassy	Countries: Bulgaria; Georgia; North Macedonia; Romania	
United Arab Emirates	Abu Dhabi	Embassy		
United Arab Emirates	Dubai	Consulate-General		

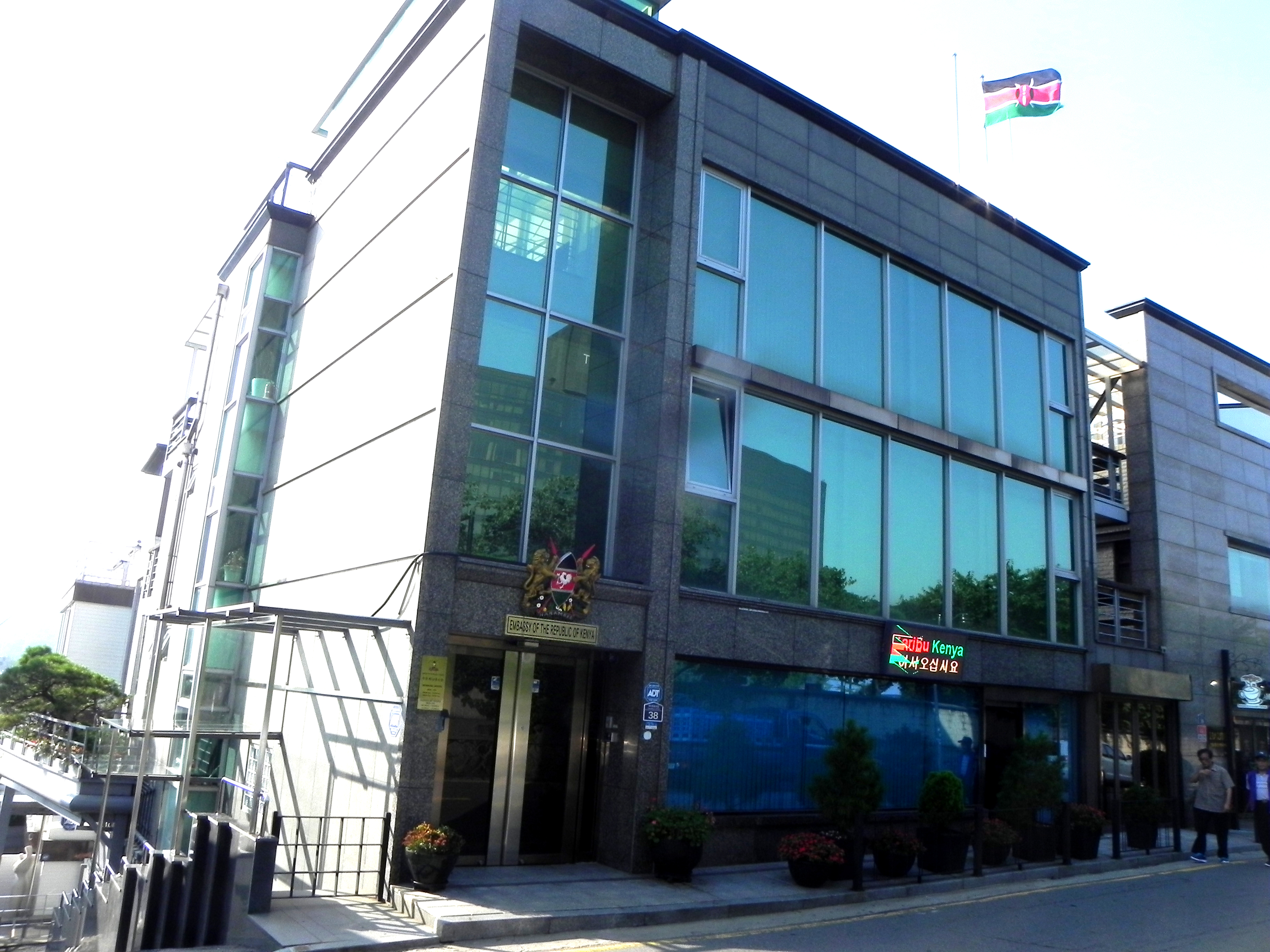
Embassy in Seoul

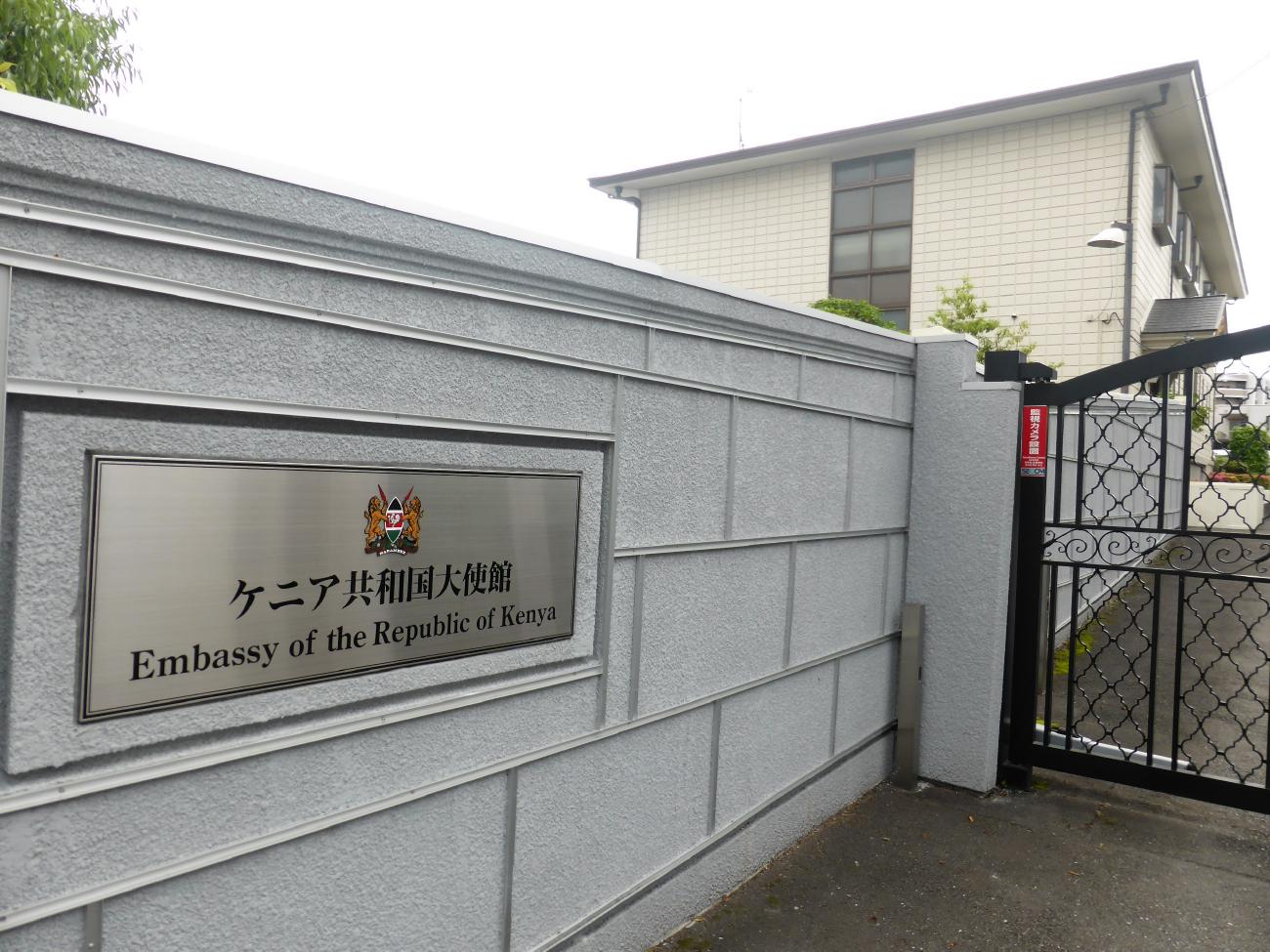
Embassy in Tokyo

=== Europe ===
Host country	Host city	Mission	Concurrent accreditation	Ref.
Austria	Vienna	Embassy	Countries: Croatia; Hungary; Slovakia; Slovenia; Ukraine; Multilateral Organizations: United Nations; International Atomic Energy Agency; UNIDO; UNODC; United Nations Office for Outer Space Affairs; UNCITRAL	
Belgium	Brussels	Embassy	Countries: Luxembourg; Multilateral Organizations: European Union	
France	Paris	Embassy	Countries: Monaco; Portugal; Serbia	
Germany	Berlin	Embassy	Countries: Czechia; Poland	
Holy See	Rome	Embassy		
Ireland	Dublin	Embassy		
Italy	Rome	Embassy	Countries: Albania; Cyprus; Greece; Malta; Multilateral Organizations: Food and Agriculture Organization; International Fund for Agricultural Development; World Food Programme	
Netherlands	The Hague	Embassy	Multilateral Organizations: International Criminal Court; Organisation for the Prohibition of Chemical Weapons; Permanent Court of Arbitration	
Russia	Moscow	Embassy	Countries: Belarus; Kazakhstan	
Spain	Madrid	Embassy	Countries: Andorra; Multilateral Organizations: World Tourism Organization	
Sweden	Stockholm	Embassy	Countries: Denmark; Estonia; Finland; Iceland; Latvia; Lithuania; Norway	
Switzerland	Bern	Embassy (Note: Slated for closure on 30 November 2026.)	Countries: Liechtenstein	
United Kingdom	London	High Commission	Multilateral Organizations: Commonwealth of Nations; International Maritime Organization	

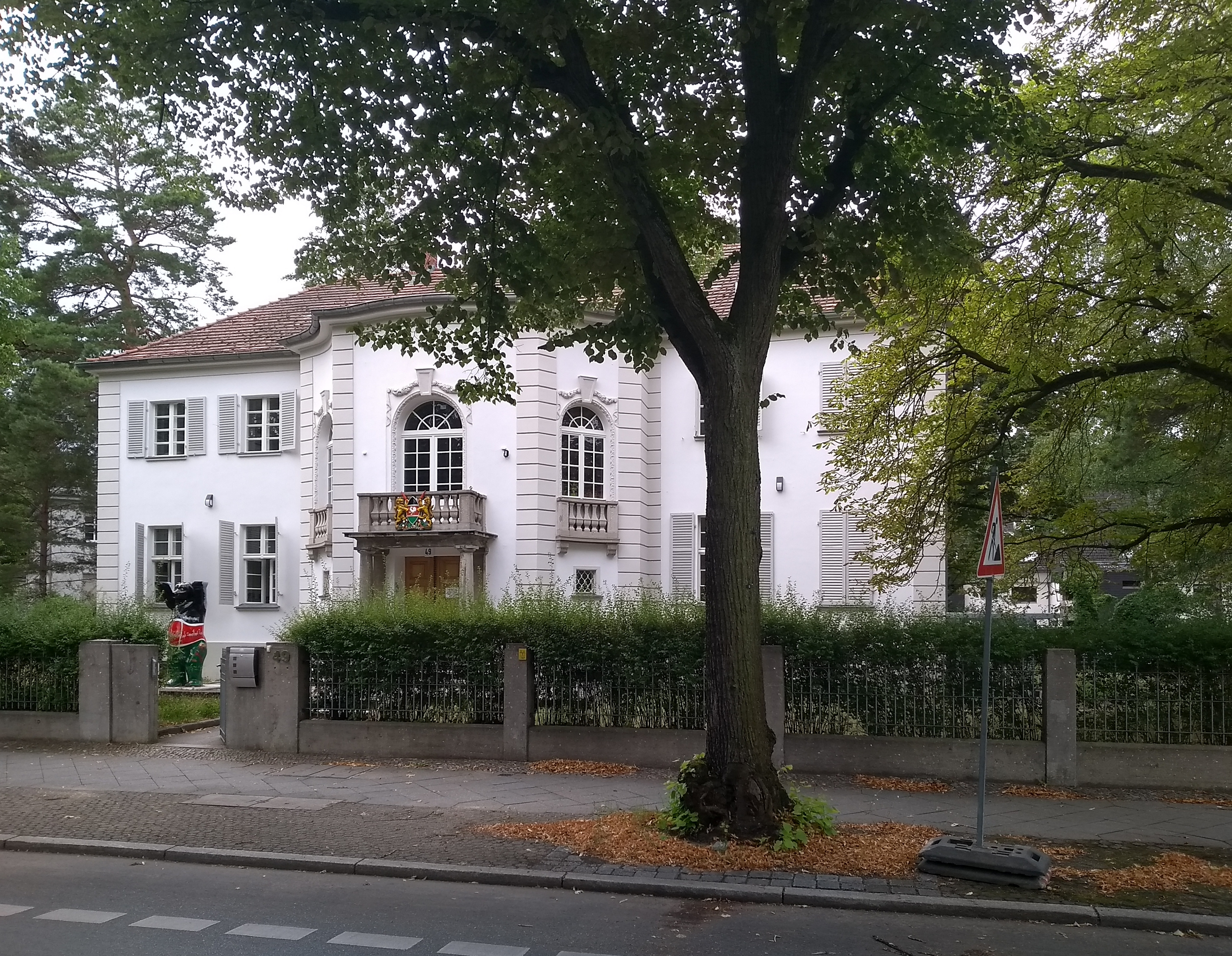
Embassy in Berlin

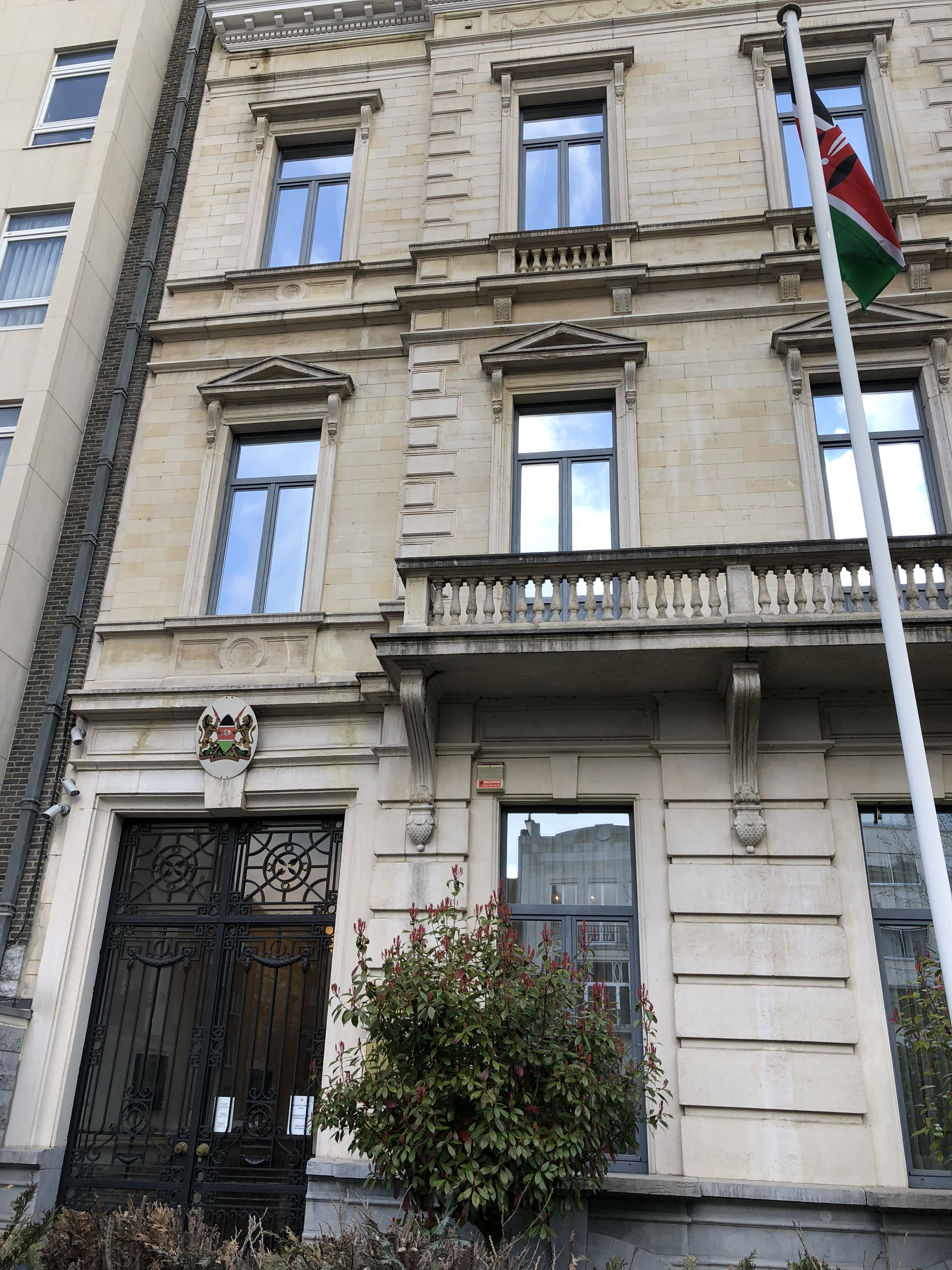
Embassy in Brussels

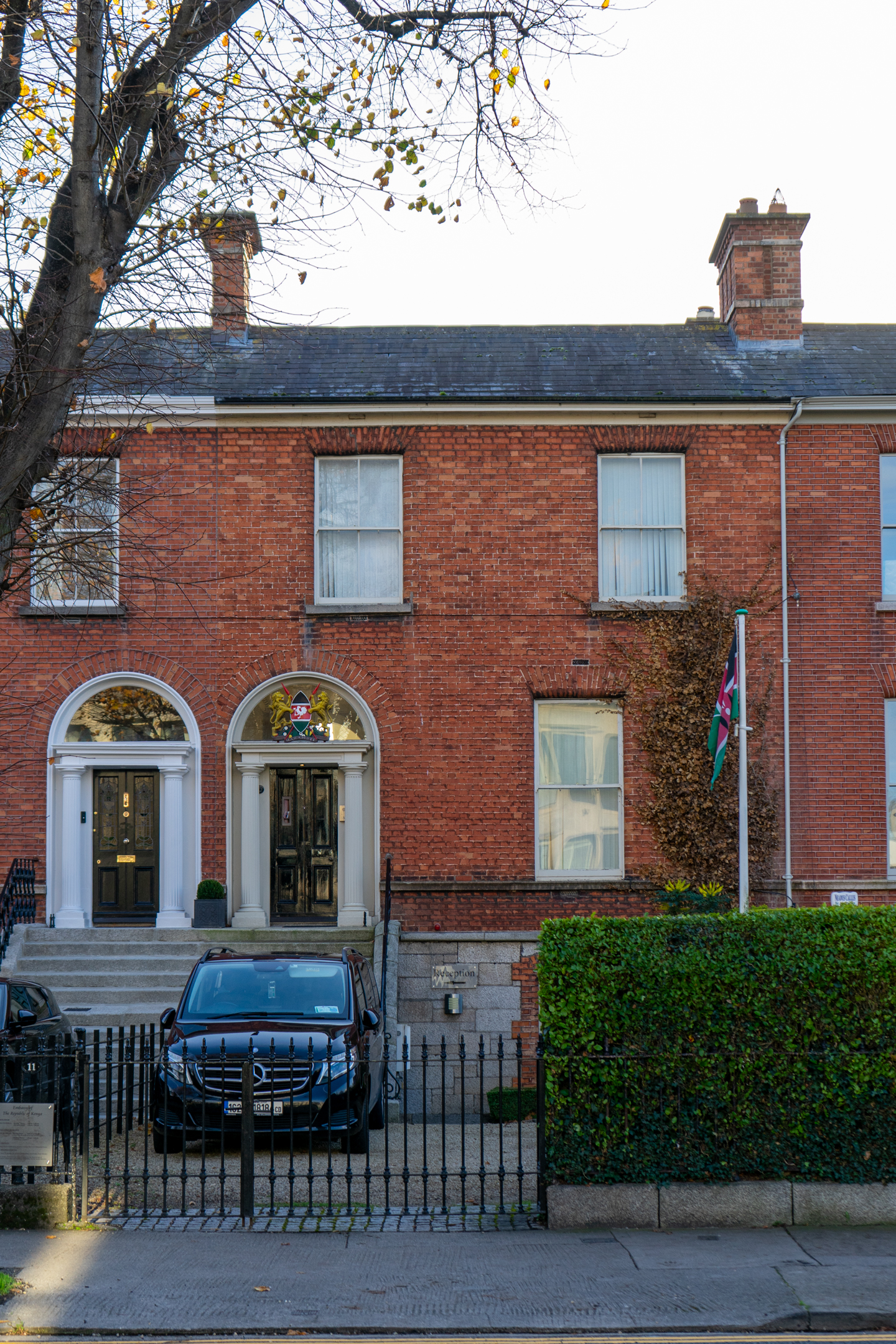
Embassy in Dublin

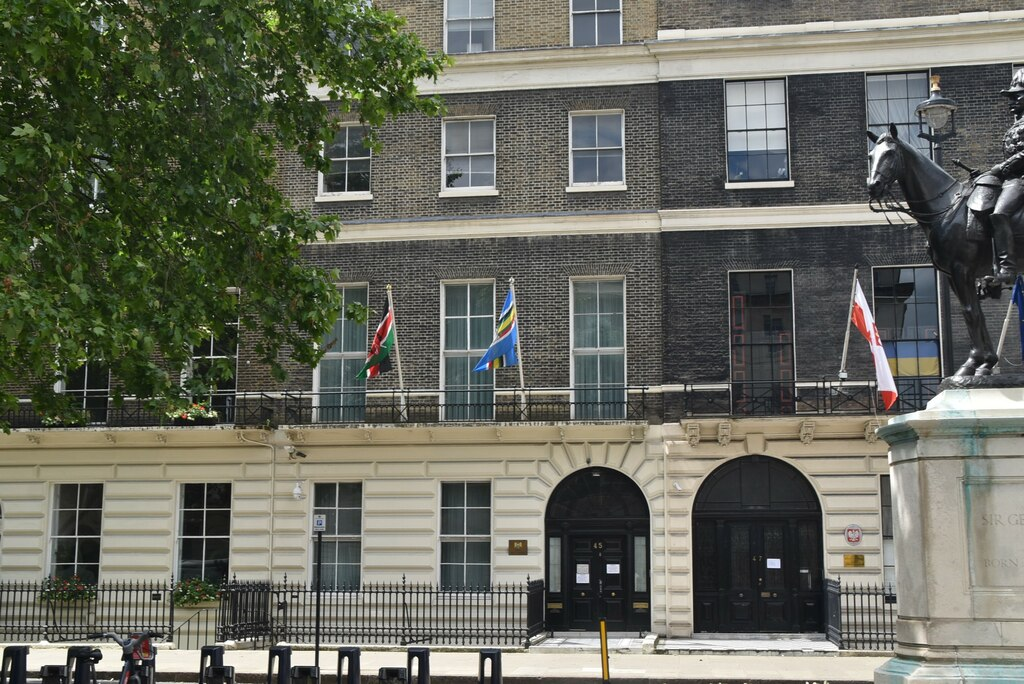
High Commission in London

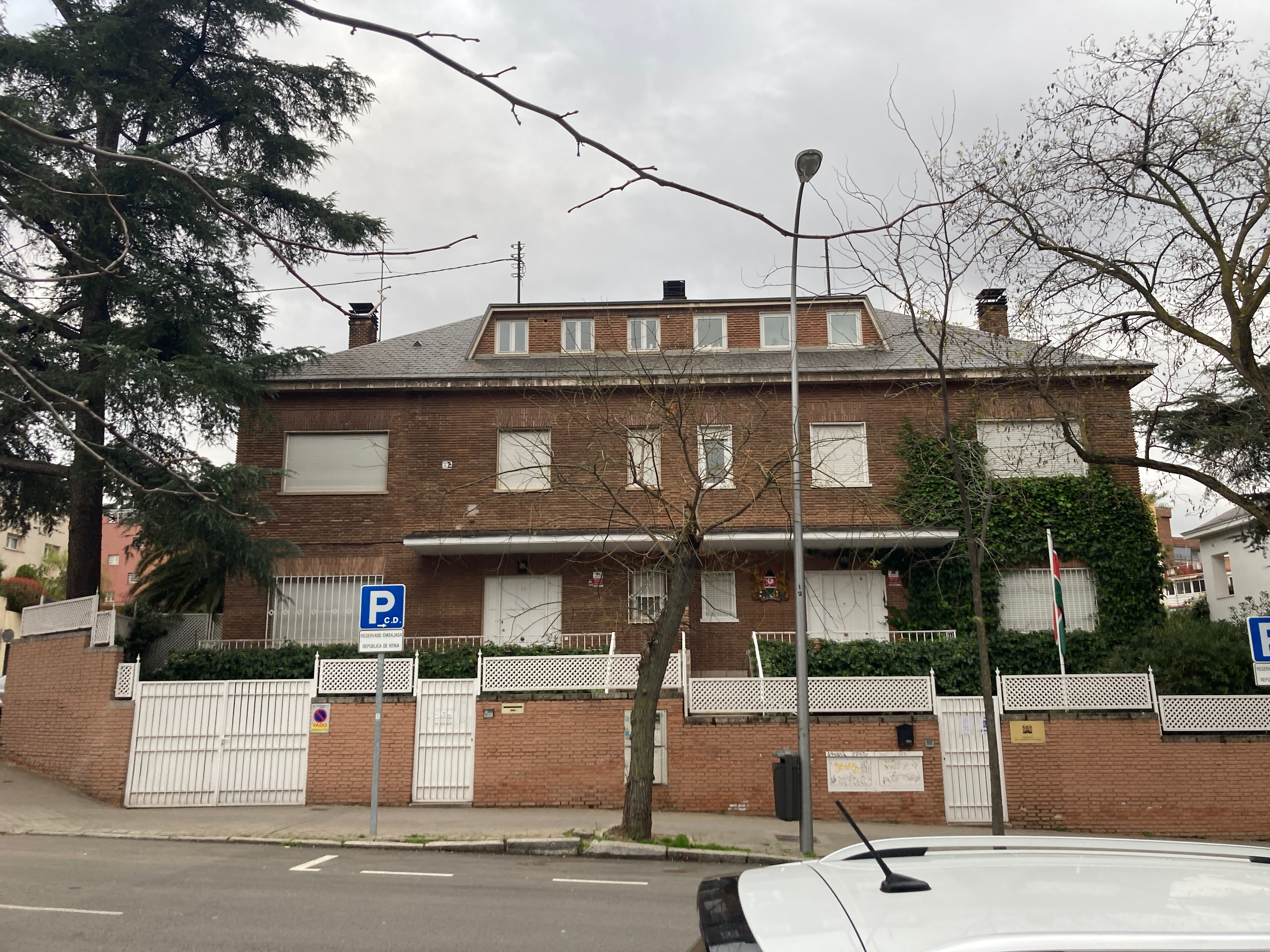
Embassy in Madrid

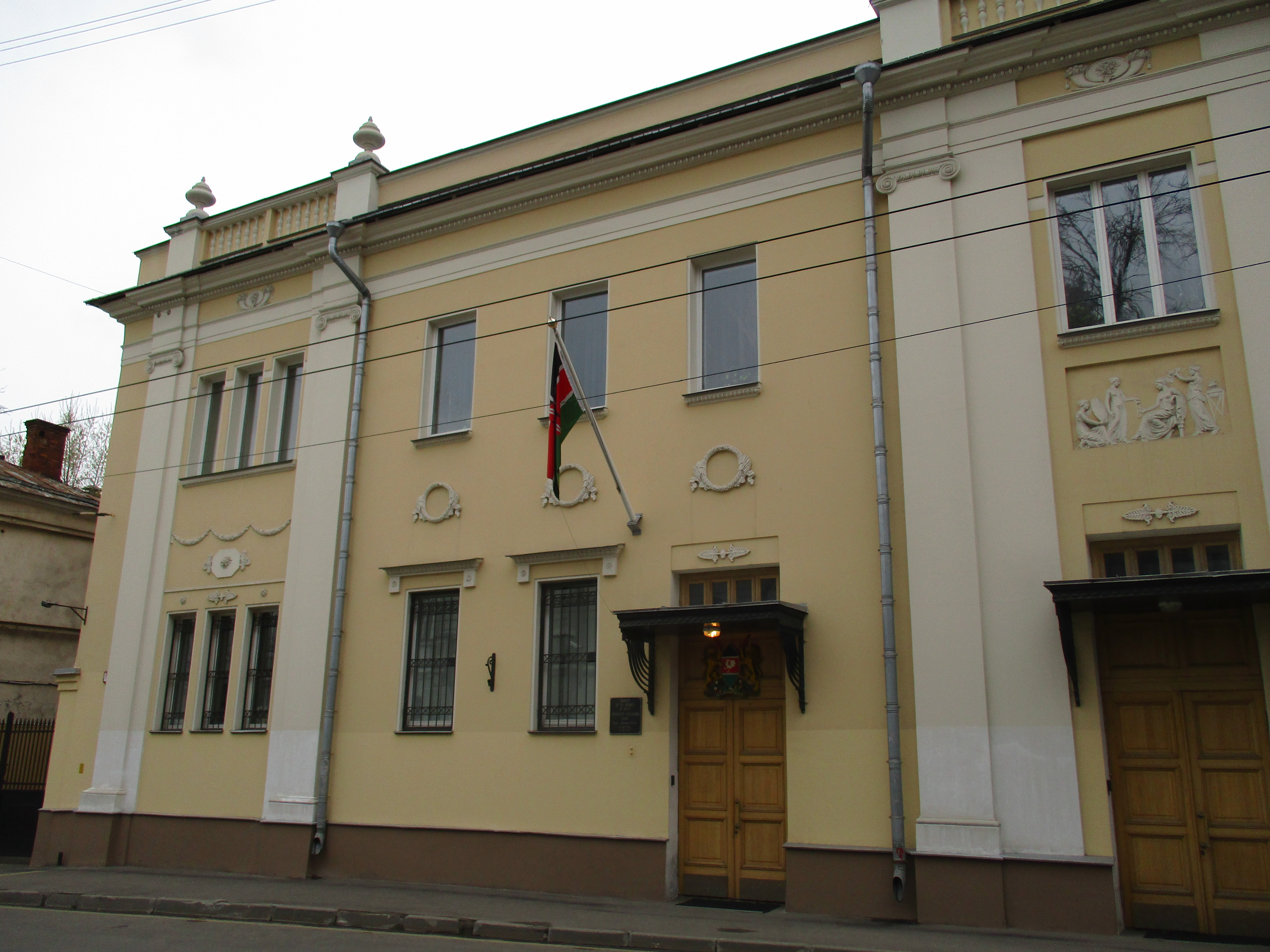
Embassy in Moscow

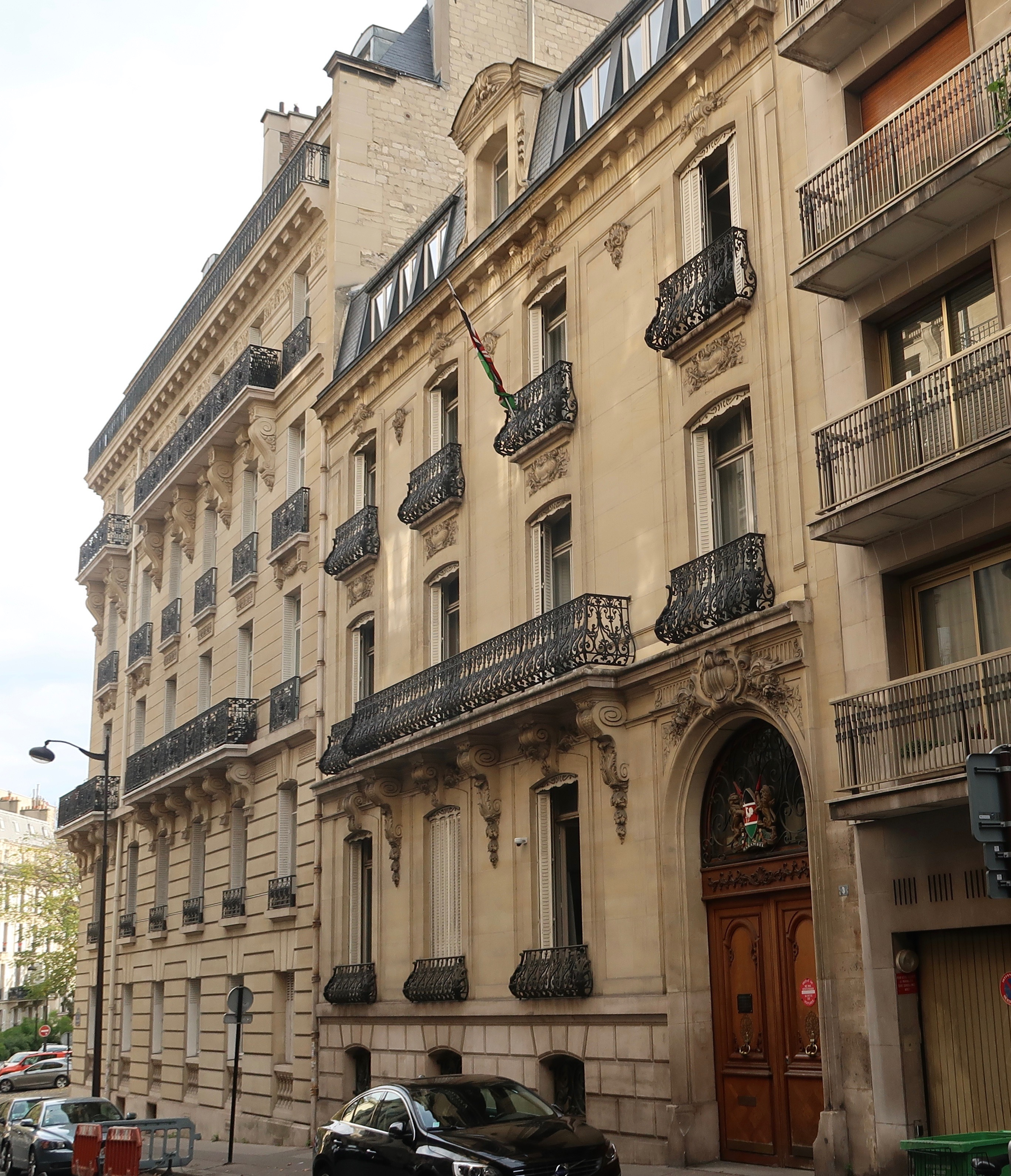
Embassy in Paris

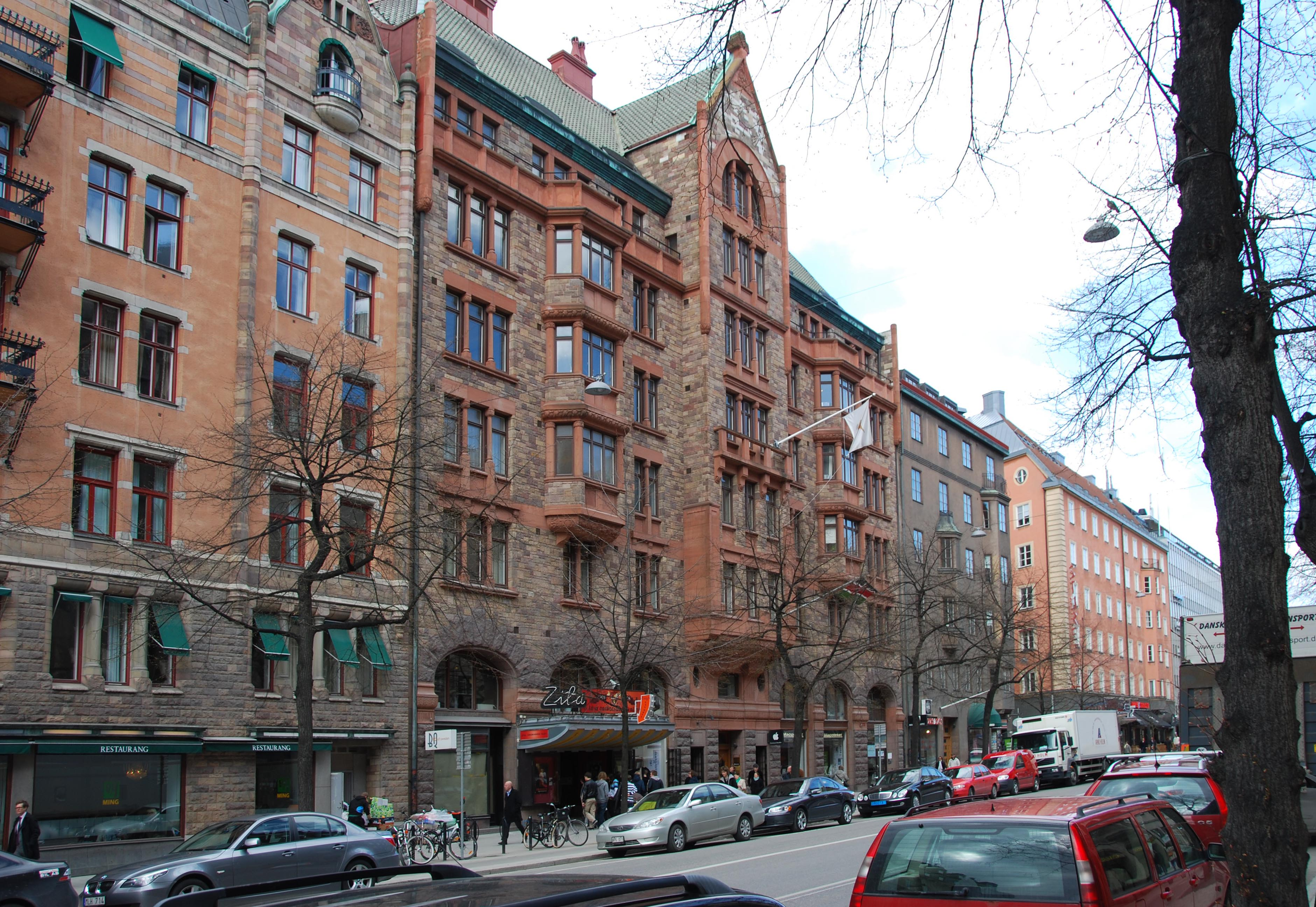
Embassy in Stockholm

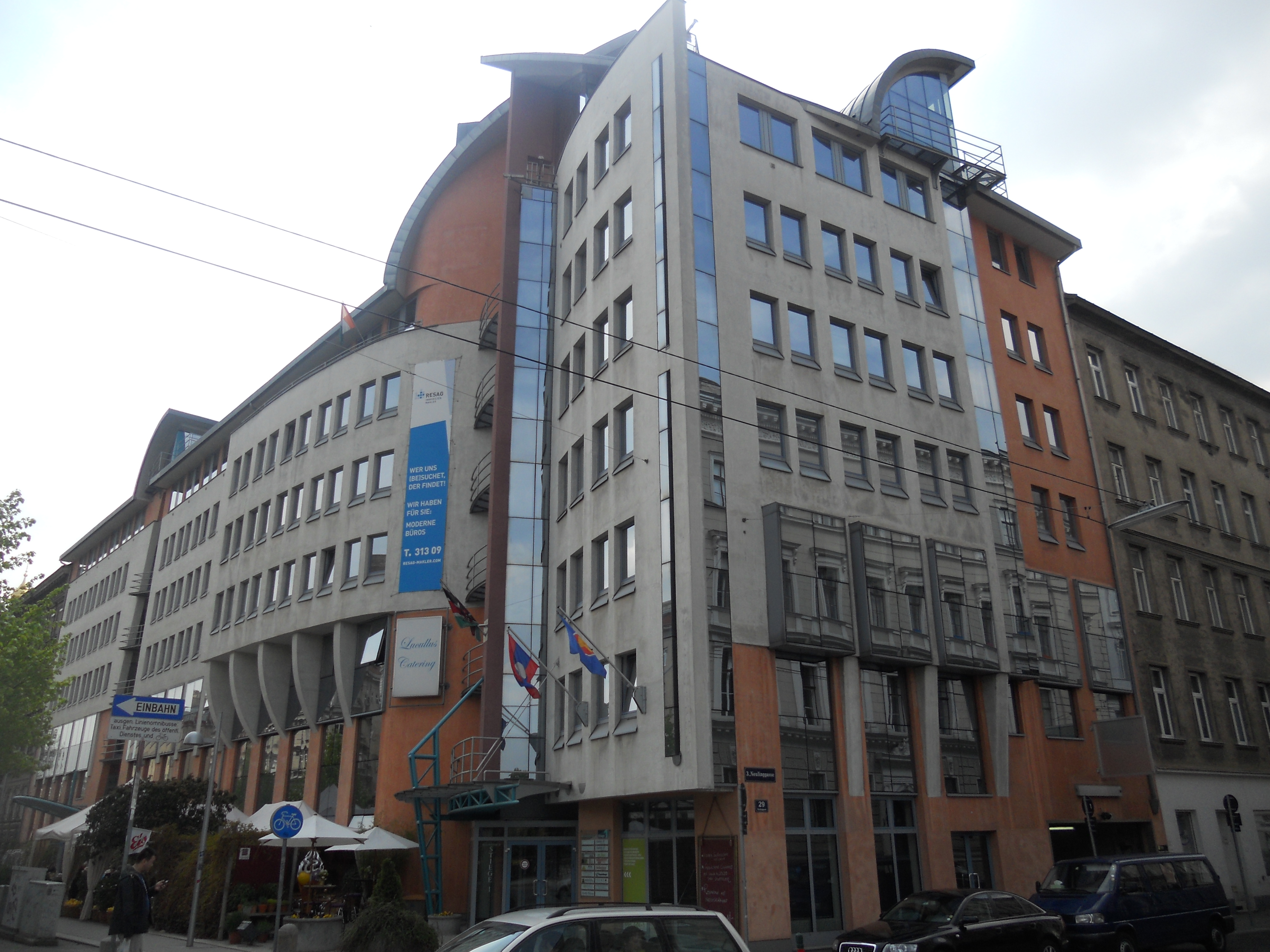
Embassy in Vienna

=== Oceania ===
Host country	Host city	Mission	Concurrent accreditation	Ref.
Australia	Canberra	High Commission	Countries: Fiji; Kiribati; Nauru; New Zealand; Papua New Guinea; Samoa; Timor-Leste; Vanuatu	

=== Multilateral organizations ===
Organization	Host city	Host country	Mission	Concurrent accreditation	Ref.
United Nations	New York City	United States	Permanent Mission	Countries: Guatemala	
United Nations	Geneva	Switzerland	Permanent Mission	Multilateral Organizations: Conference on Disarmament; World Health Organization; World Trade Organization	
United Nations	Nairobi	Kenya	Permanent Mission	Multilateral Organizations: United Nations Environment Programme	
UN-Habitat	Nairobi	Kenya	Permanent Mission		
UNESCO	Paris	France	Permanent Mission		

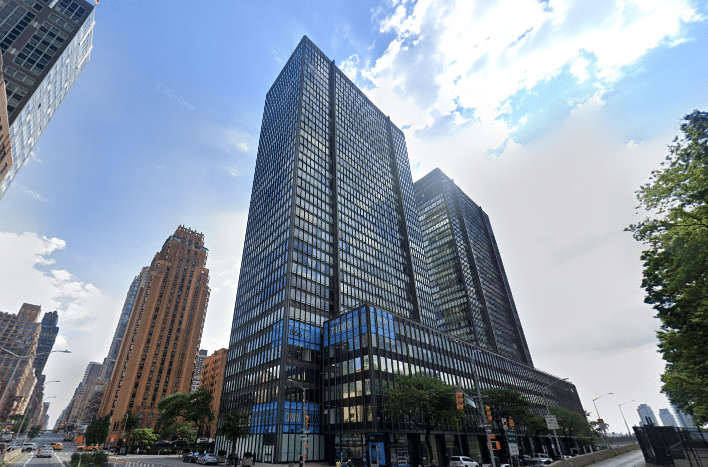
Building hosting the Permanent Mission to the United Nations in New York City

== Closed missions ==
=== Africa ===
Host country	Host city	Mission	Year closed	Ref.
Libya	Tripoli	Embassy (Note: Resident in Algiers, Algeria)	2014	
Sudan	Khartoum	Embassy	2023	

=== Americas ===
Host country	Host city	Mission	Year closed	Ref.
Cuba	Havana	Embassy	2026	
Haiti	Port-au-Prince	Consulate-General	2026	

== Missions to open ==
Host country	Host city	Mission	Ref.
Azerbaijan	Baku	Embassy	
Congo-Brazzaville	Brazzaville	Embassy	
Denmark	Copenhagen	Embassy	
Kazakhstan	Astana	Consulate-General	
Vietnam	Hanoi	Embassy	

== See also ==
- Foreign relations of Kenya
- List of diplomatic missions in Kenya
- Visa policy of Kenya
