= International rankings of Kenya =

These are the international rankings of Kenya.

== International rankings ==
Organization	Survey	Ranking
Institute for Economics and Peace	Global Peace Index	117 out of 163
United Nations Development Programme	Human Development Index	146 out of 193
Transparency International	Corruption Perceptions Index	126 out of 180
World Intellectual Property Organization	Global Innovation Index, 2026	97 out of 139
