= List of diplomatic missions in Kenya =

This is a list of diplomatic missions in Kenya. There are currently 100 embassies/high commissions in Nairobi and three consulates in Mombasa.

Honorary consulates are not listed below.

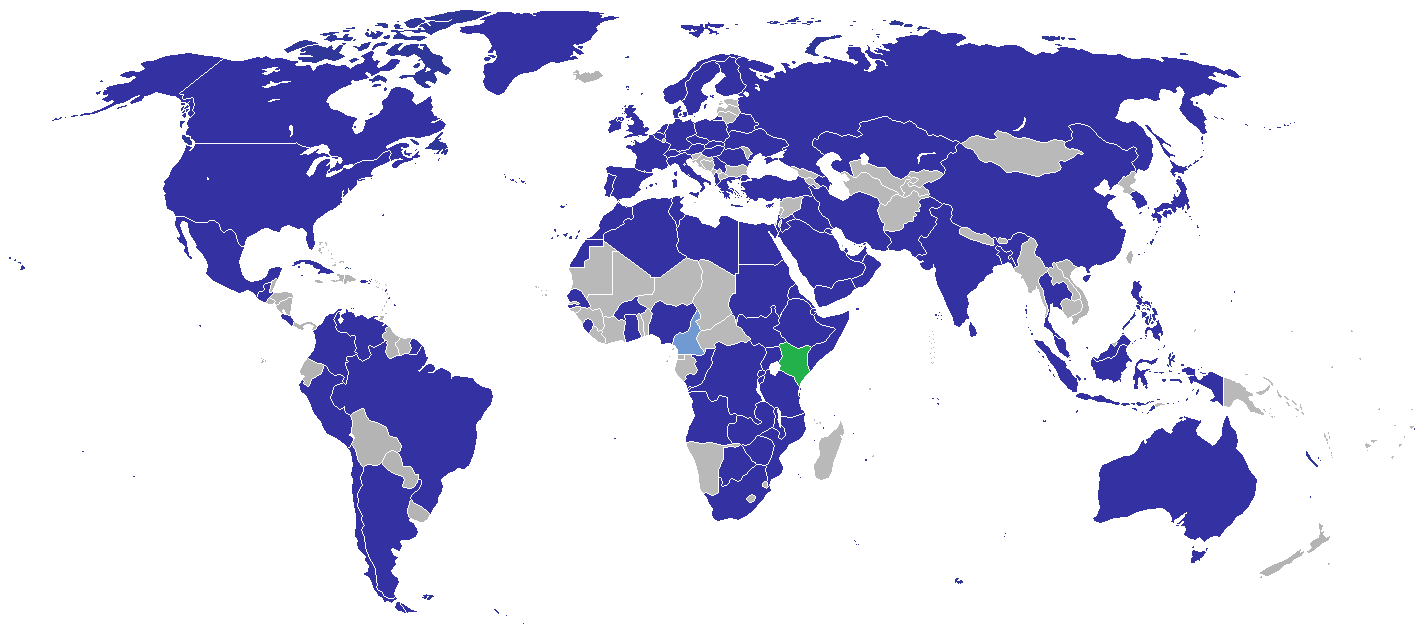
Diplomatic missions in Kenya

== Diplomatic missions in Nairobi ==
=== Embassies and High Commissions ===
Entries marked with an asterisk (*) are member-states of the Commonwealth of Nations. As such, their embassies are formally termed as "high commissions".

1. Albania
2. Algeria
3. Angola
4. Argentina
5. Australia*
6. Austria
7. Azerbaijan
8. Bangladesh*
9. Barbados*
10. Belarus
11. Belgium
12. Botswana*
13. Brazil
14. Burkina Faso
15. Burundi
16. Canada*
17. Chile
18. China
19. Colombia
20. Congo-Brazzaville
21. Congo-Kinshasa
22. Costa Rica
23. Cuba
24. Cyprus*
25. Czech Republic
26. Denmark
27. Djibouti
28. Egypt
29. Eritrea
30. Estonia
31. Ethiopia
32. Finland
33. France
34. Germany
35. Ghana*
36. Greece
37. Guatemala
38. Holy See
39. Hungary
40. India*
41. Indonesia
42. Iran
43. Iraq
44. Ireland
45. Israel
46. Italy
47. Japan
48. Jordan
49. Kazakhstan
50. Kuwait
51. Libya
52. Malawi*
53. Malaysia*
54. Mexico
55. Morocco
56. Mozambique*
57. Netherlands
58. Nigeria*
59. Norway
60. Oman
61. Pakistan*
62. Palestine
63. Peru
64. Philippines
65. Poland
66. Portugal
67. Qatar
68. Romania
69. Russia
70. Rwanda*
71. San Marino
72. Sahrawi Republic
73. Saudi Arabia
74. Senegal
75. Serbia
76. Sierra Leone*
77. Slovakia
78. Somalia
79. South Africa*
80. South Korea
81. South Sudan
82. Sovereign Military Order of Malta
83. Spain
84. Sri Lanka*
85. Sudan
86. Sweden
87. Switzerland
88. Tanzania*
89. Thailand
90. Tunisia
91. Turkey
92. Uganda*
93. Ukraine
94. United Arab Emirates
95. United Kingdom*
96. United States
97. Venezuela
98. Yemen
99. Zambia*
100. Zimbabwe

=== Permanent missions to the United Nations Office at Nairobi ===
1. Kenya
2. Poland
3. United States

=== Other missions or delegations ===
1. Arab League (Mission)
2. European Union (Delegation)
3. Intergovernmental Authority on Development (Mission)
4. International Committee of the Red Cross (Delegation)
5. Somaliland (Mission)
6. United Nations (Resident coordinator's office)
7. World Health Organization

=== Gallery ===
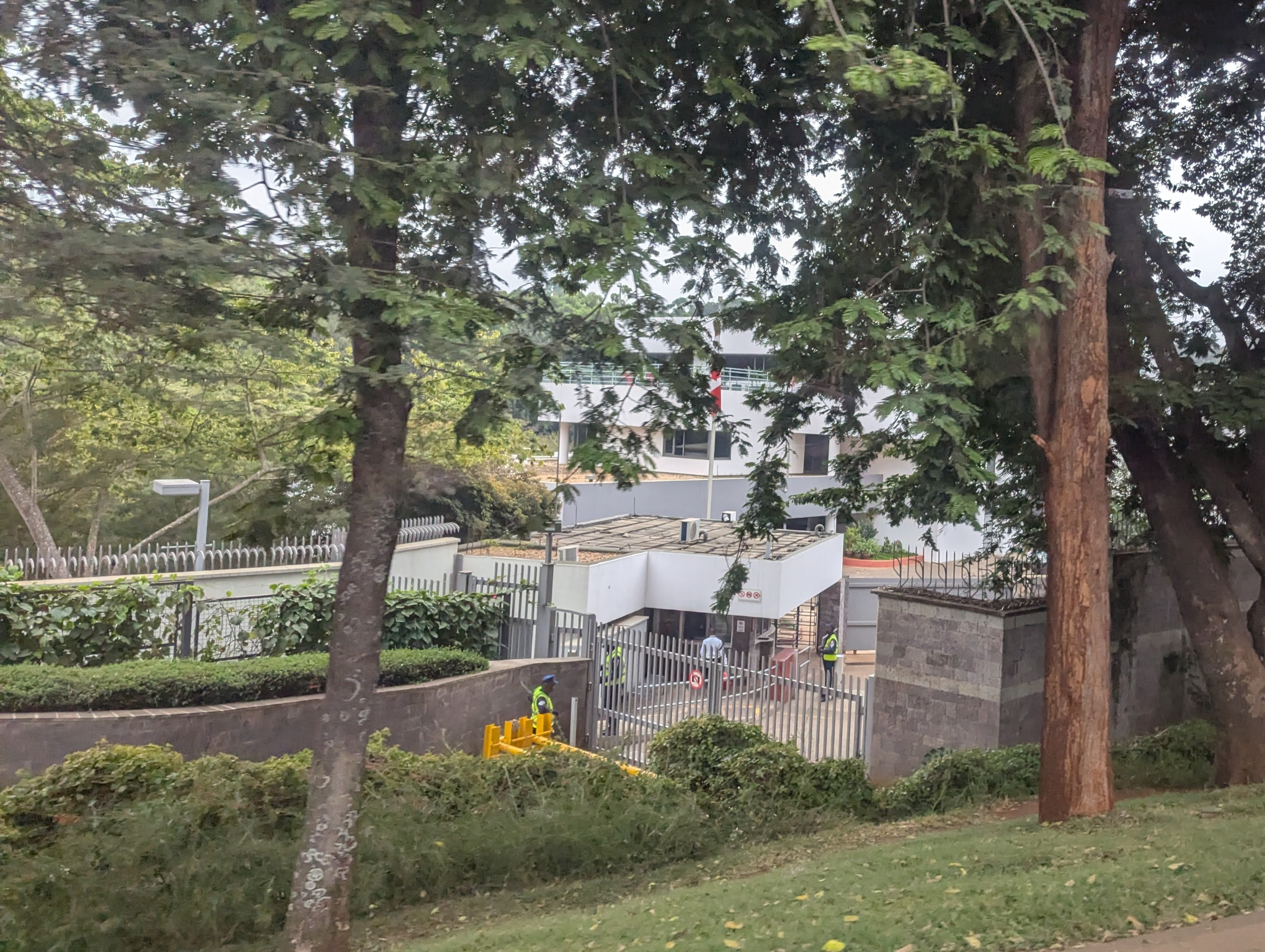
High Commission of Canada

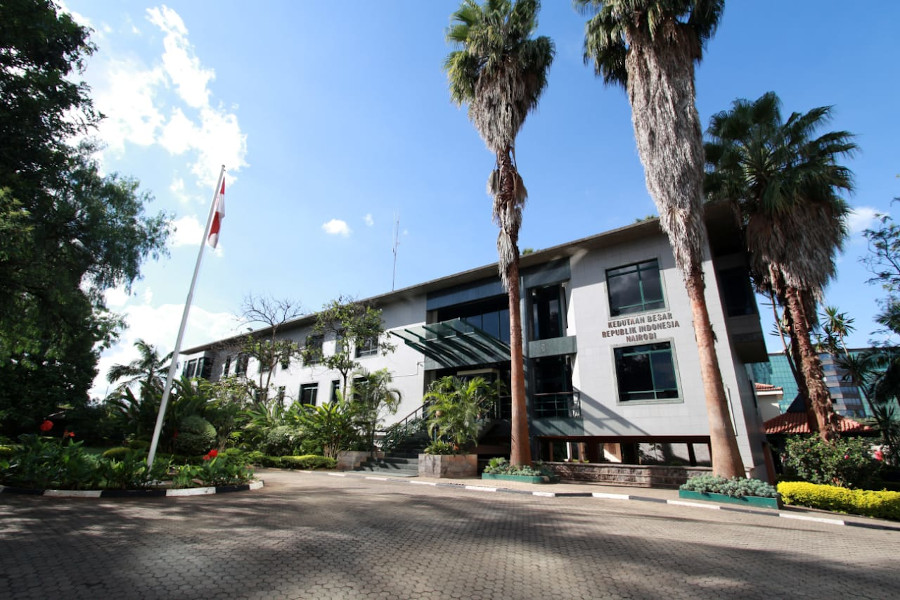
Embassy of Indonesia

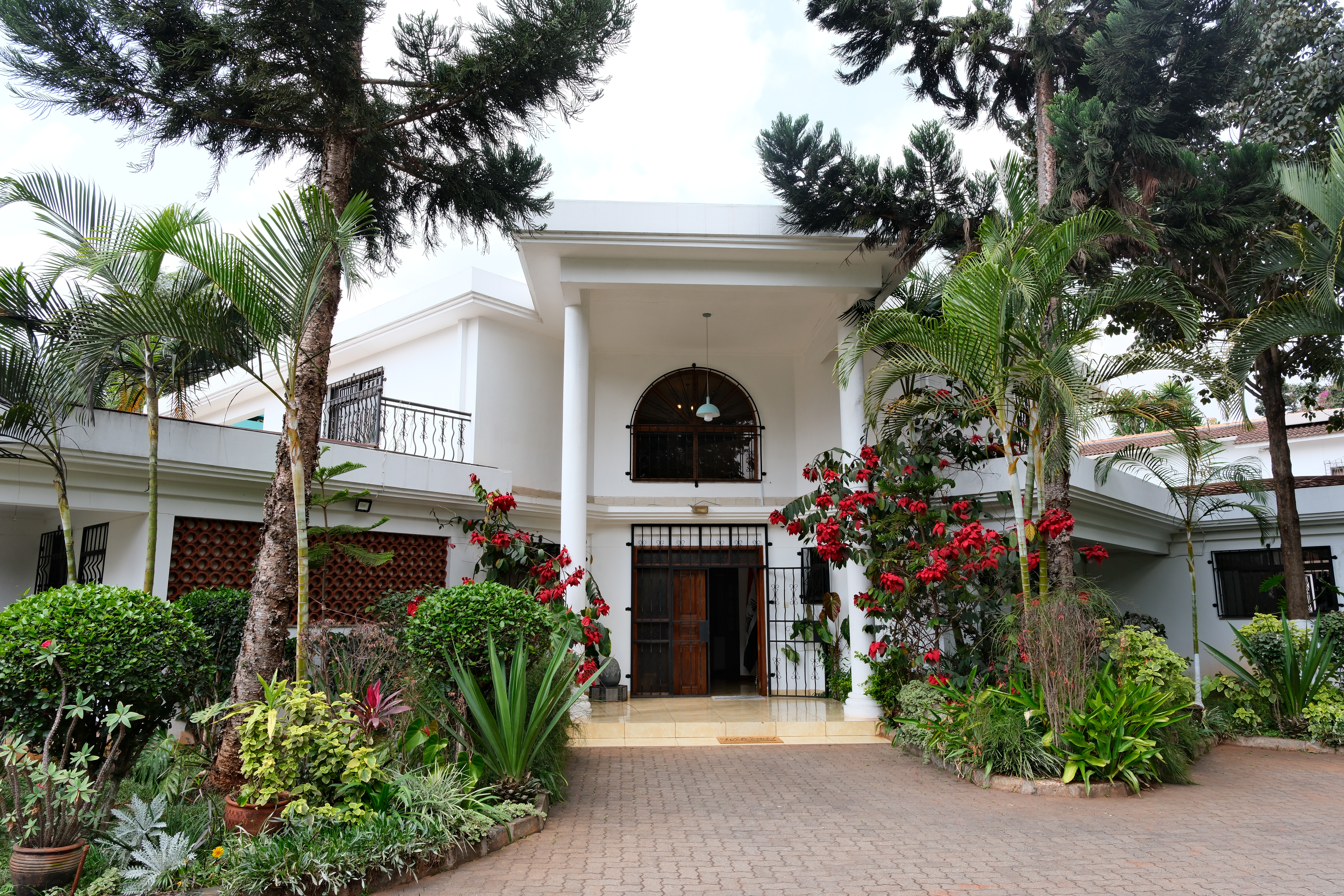
Embassy of Iraq

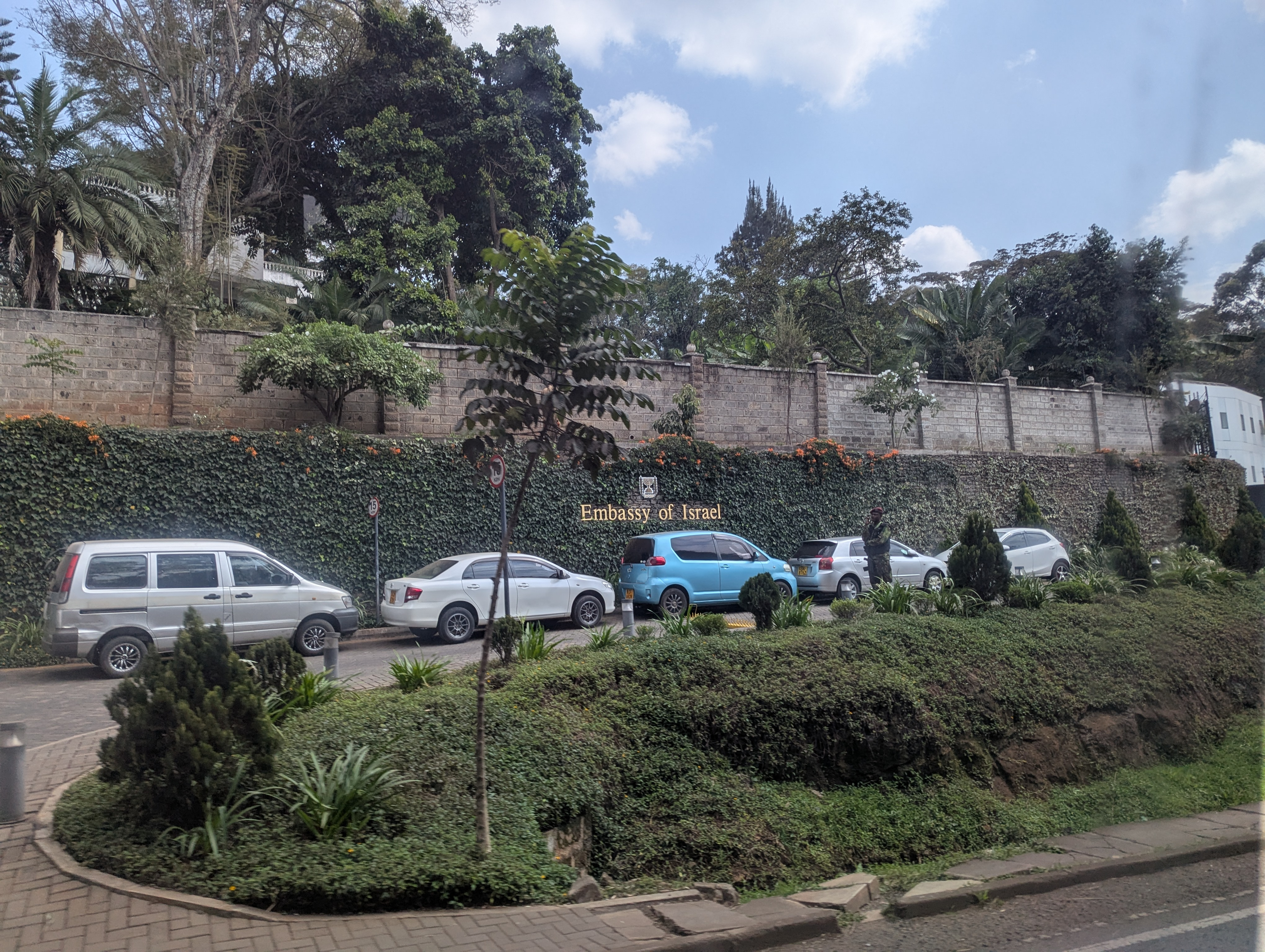
Embassy of Israel

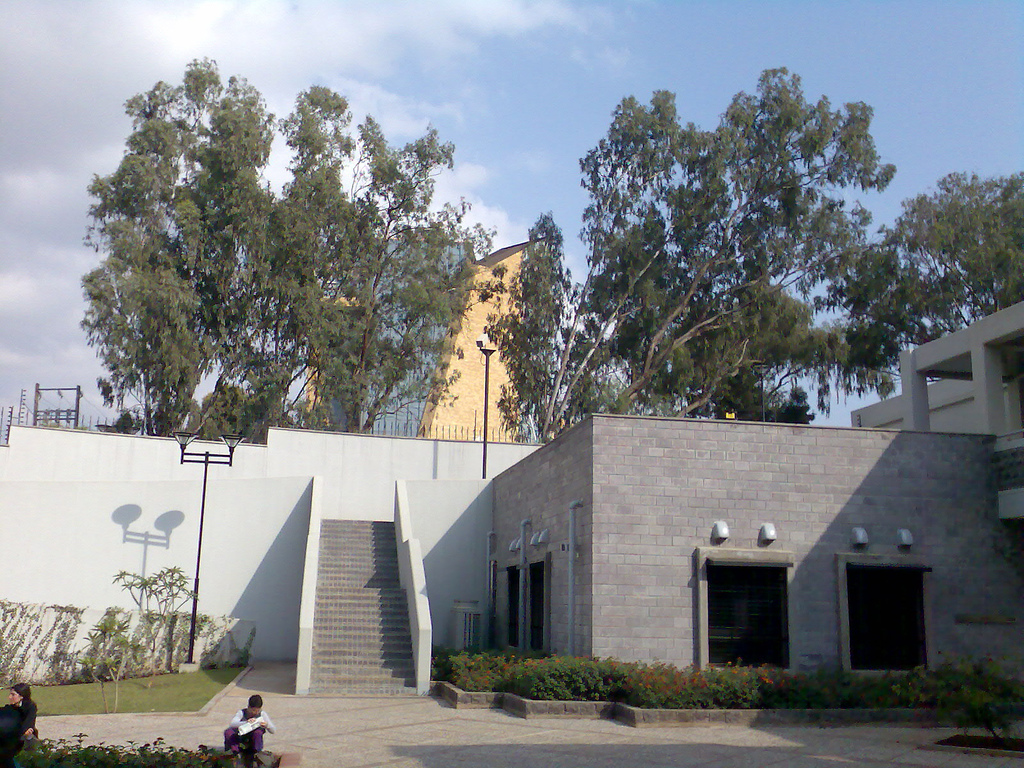
Embassy of Japan

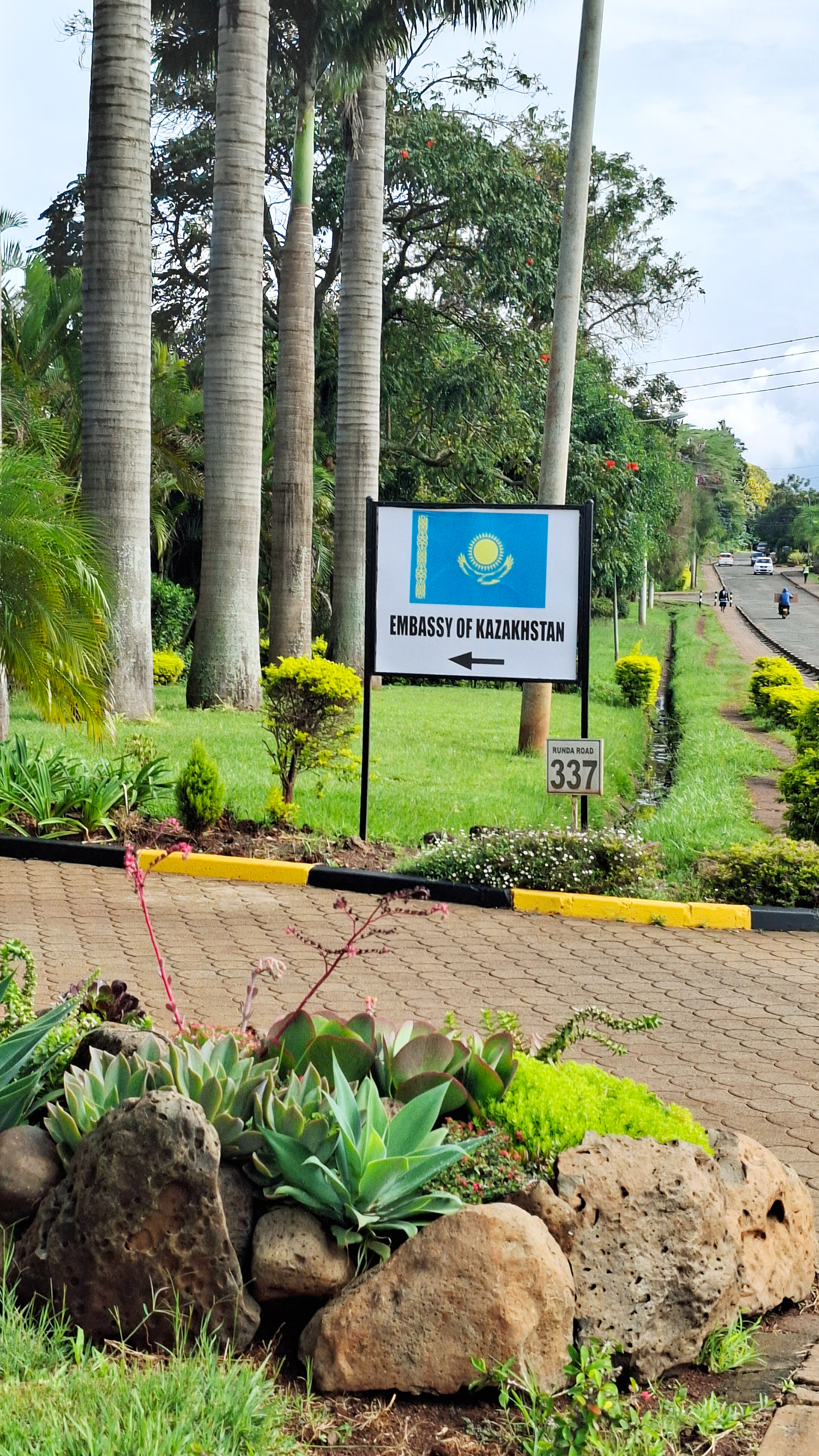
Embassy of Kazakhstan

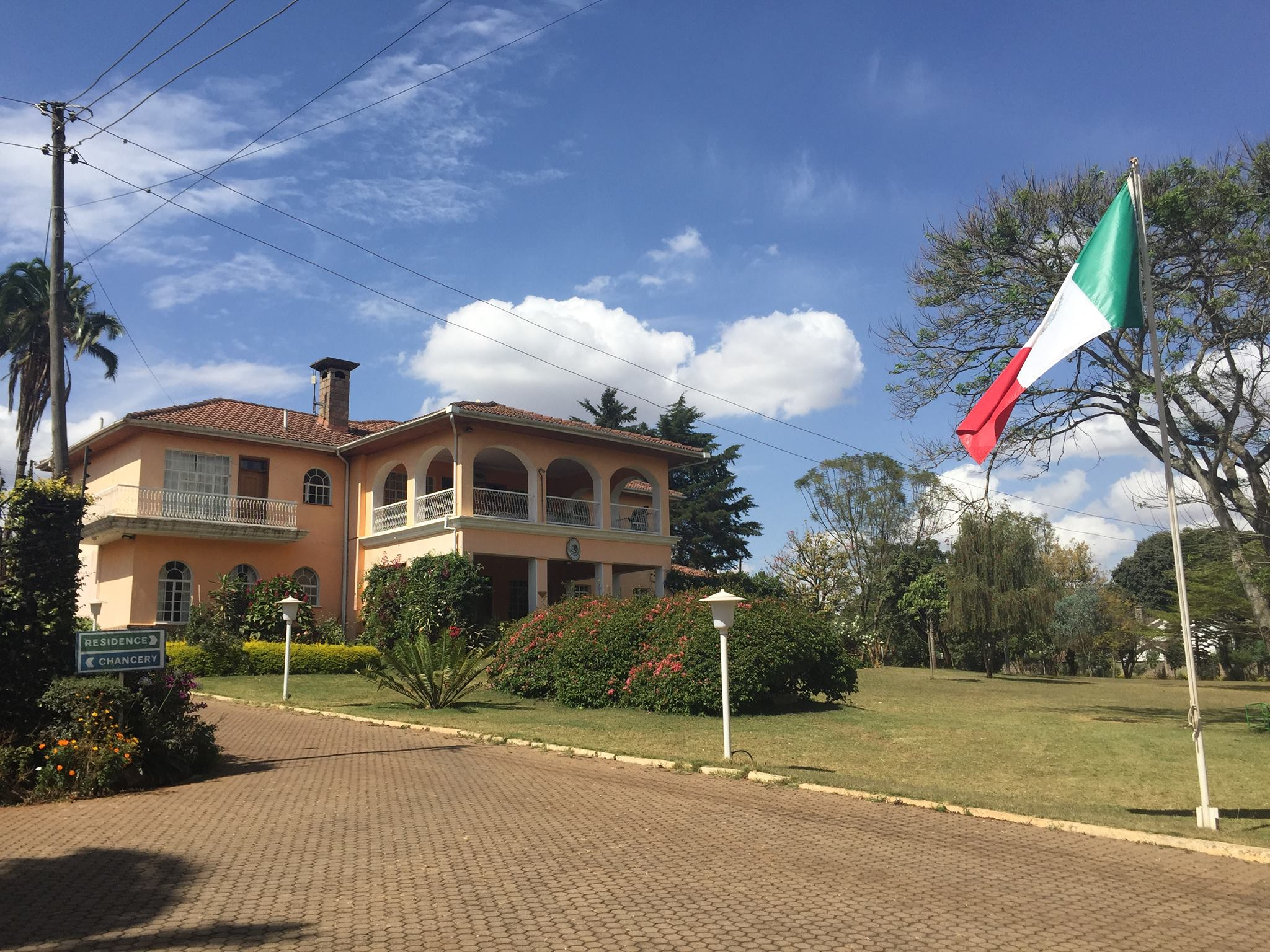
Embassy of Mexico

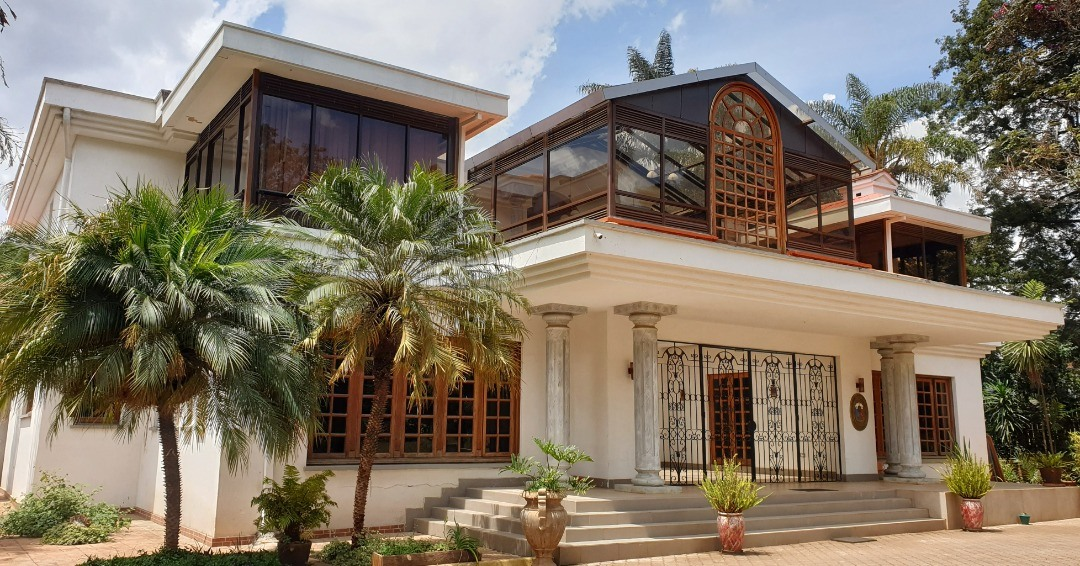
Embassy of the Philippines

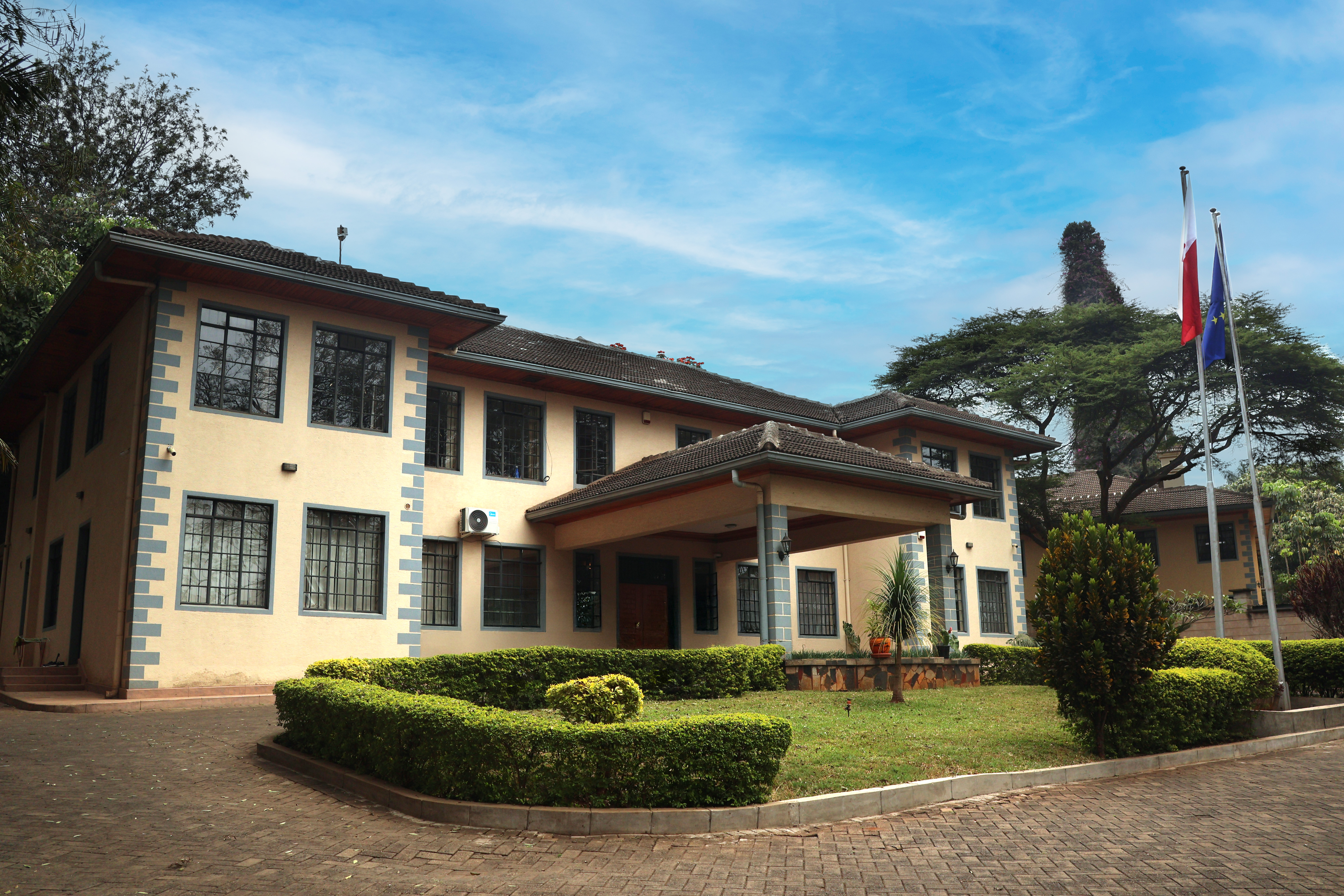
Embassy of Poland

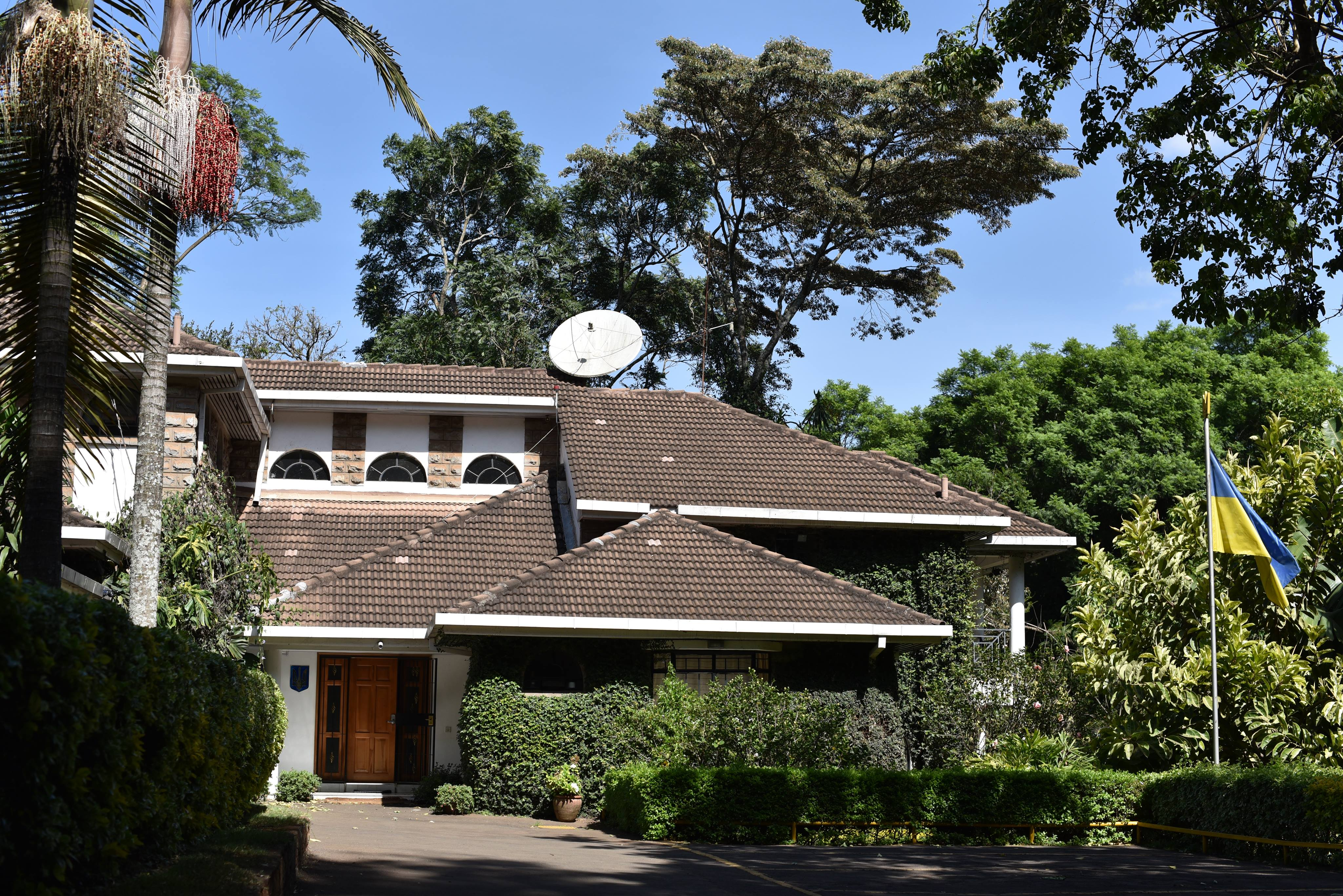
Embassy of Ukraine

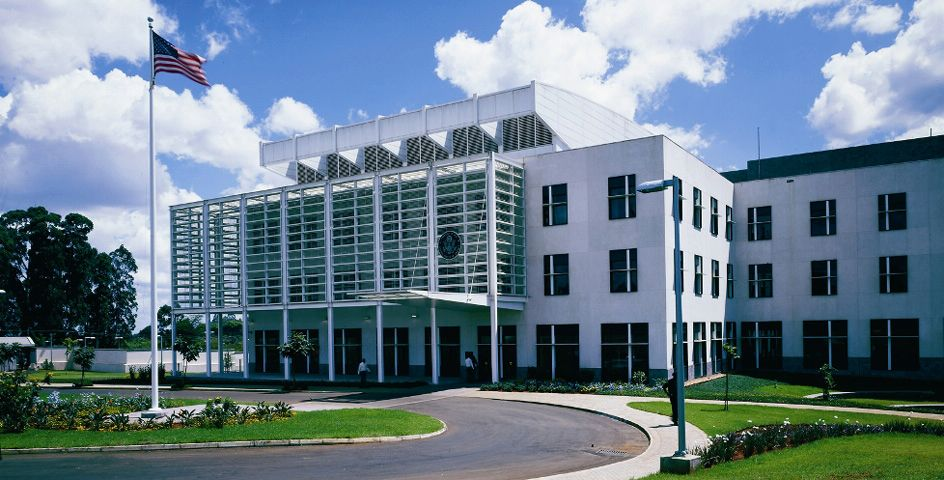
Embassy of the United States

== Consular missions ==
Both Nairobi and the port city of Mombasa host career consular missions. All are consulates-general unless indicated otherwise.

=== Nairobi ===
1. Cameroon

=== Mombasa, Mombasa County ===
1. India (Assistant High Commission)
2. Tanzania
3. Uganda

== Non-resident embassies and high commissions accredited to Kenya ==
=== Resident in Addis Ababa, Ethiopia ===
1. Armenia
2. Benin
3. Bulgaria
4. Cameroon
5. Chad
6. Equatorial Guinea
7. Eswatini
8. Gabon
9. Gambia
10. Georgia
11. Guinea
12. Ivory Coast
13. Lesotho
14. Liberia
15. Madagascar
16. Mali
17. Mauritania
18. Mauritius
19. New Zealand
20. Nicaragua
21. Niger
22. Seychelles
23. Slovenia
24. Uruguay

=== Resident in Cairo, Egypt ===
1. Bosnia & Herzegovina
2. Cambodia
3. Latvia

=== Resident in Dar Es Salaam, Tanzania ===
1. Comoros
2. Namibia
3. Vietnam

=== Resident in Pretoria, South Africa ===
1. Croatia
2. Dominican Republic
3. Jamaica
4. Nepal
5. Myanmar

=== Resident in other cities ===
1. Iceland (Kampala)
2. Malta (Valletta)
3. Maldives (Abu Dhabi)
4. Singapore (Singapore)
5. Suriname (Accra)
6. Syria (Khartoum)
7. Trinidad and Tobago (Abuja)
8. Uzbekistan (Muscat)

== Missions to open ==
1. Bahamas (High Commission–under discussion)
2. Croatia (Embassy)
3. Equatorial Guinea (Embassy)
4. Ivory Coast (Embassy)
5. Liberia (Embassy)

== Closed missions ==
Host city	Sending country	Mission	Year closed	Ref.
Nairobi	Eswatini	High Commission	2004	
Mombasa	United States	Consulate	1953	

== See also ==
- Foreign relations of Kenya
- List of diplomatic missions of Kenya
- Visa policy of Kenya
