= List of international presidential trips made by Uhuru Kenyatta =

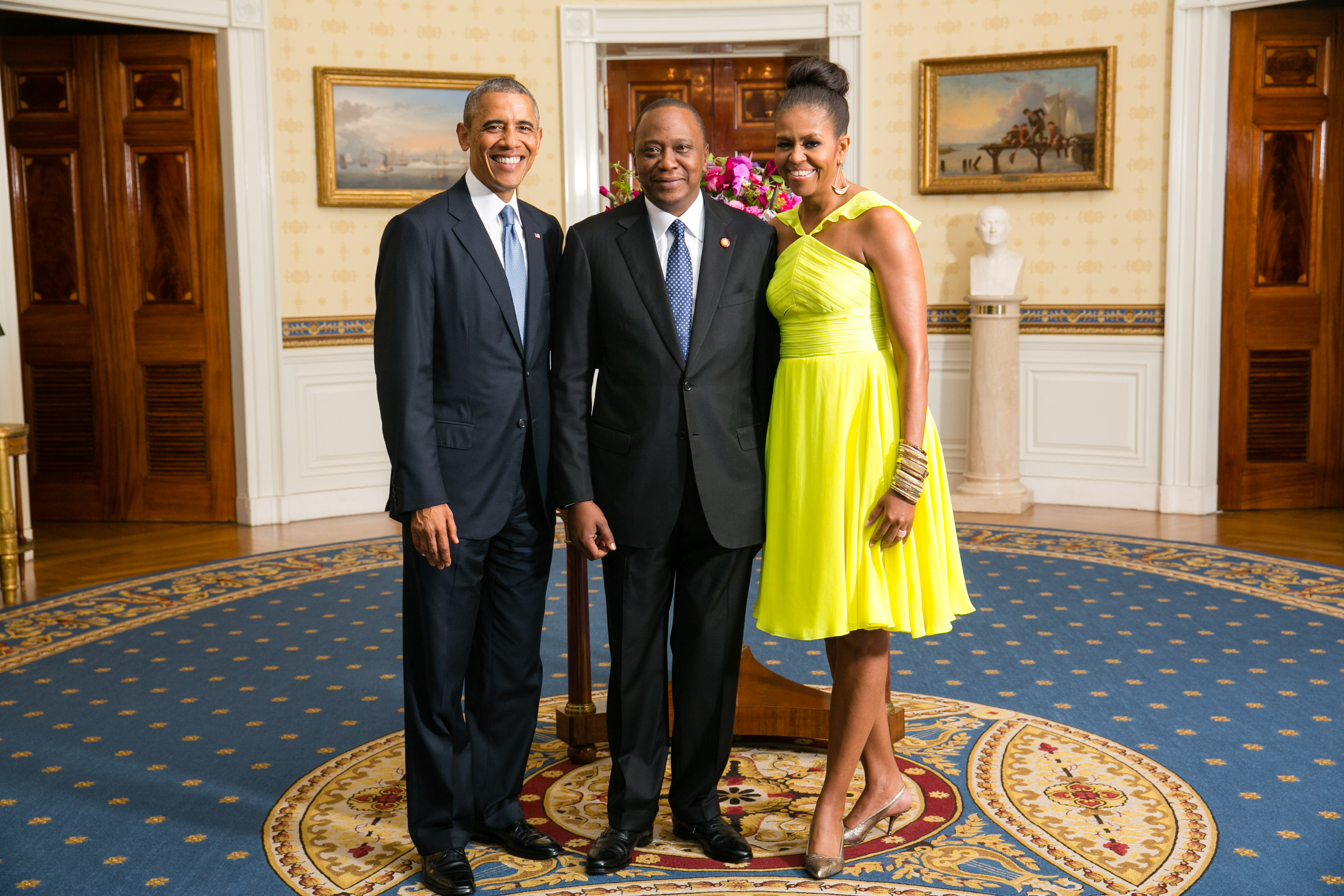
US President Barack Obama and First Lady Michelle Obama greet His Excellency Uhuru Kenyatta, President of the Republic of Kenya, in the Blue Room during a US-Africa Leaders Summit dinner at the White House, 5 August 2014.

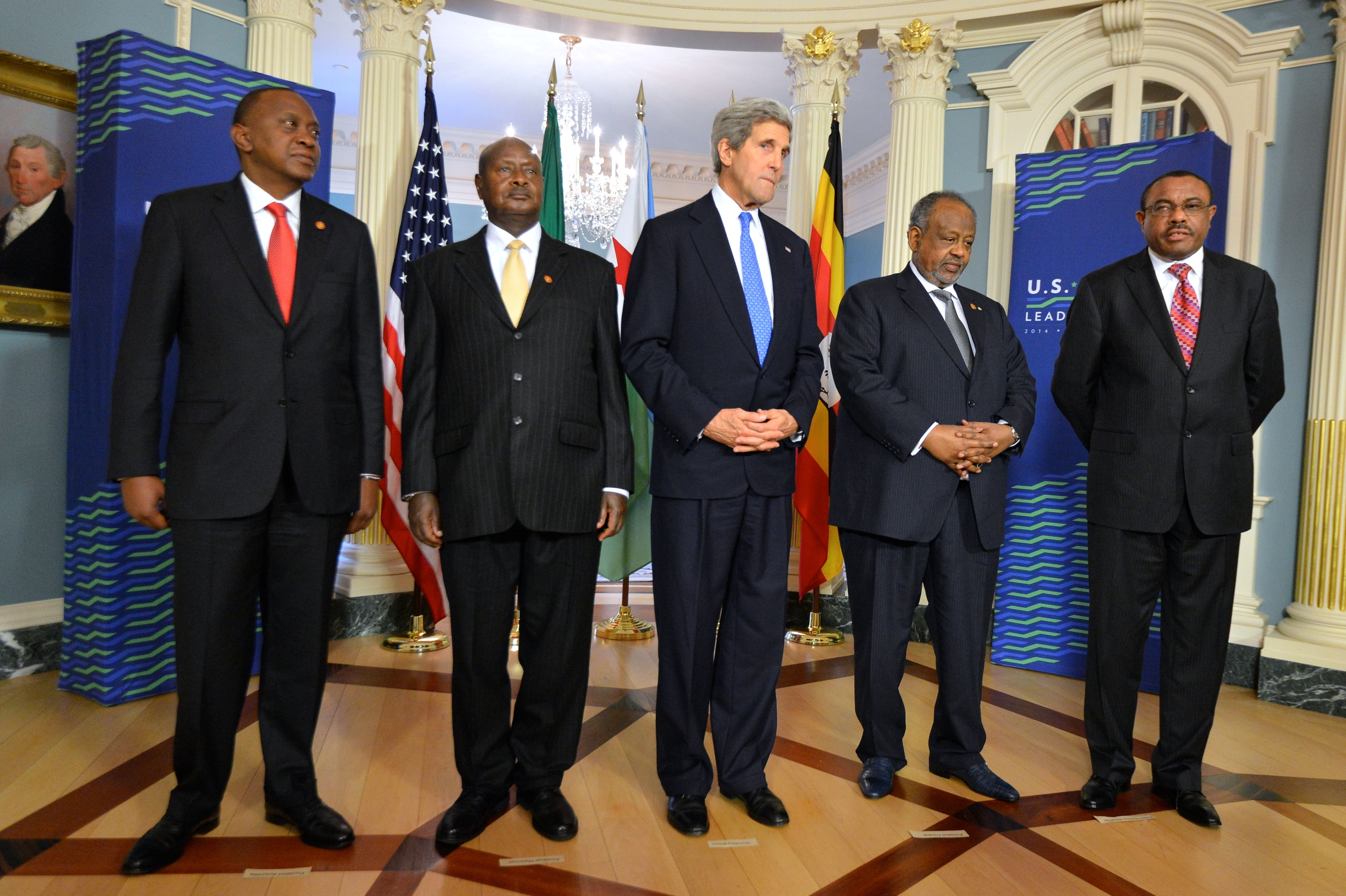
US Secretary of State John Kerry meets with President Uhuru Kenyatta of Kenya, President Yoweri Museveni of Uganda, President Ismail Omar Guelleh of Djibouti, and Prime Minister Hailemariam Desalegn of Ethiopia to discuss the situation in South Sudan at the US Department of State in Washington, D.C., on 5 August 2014

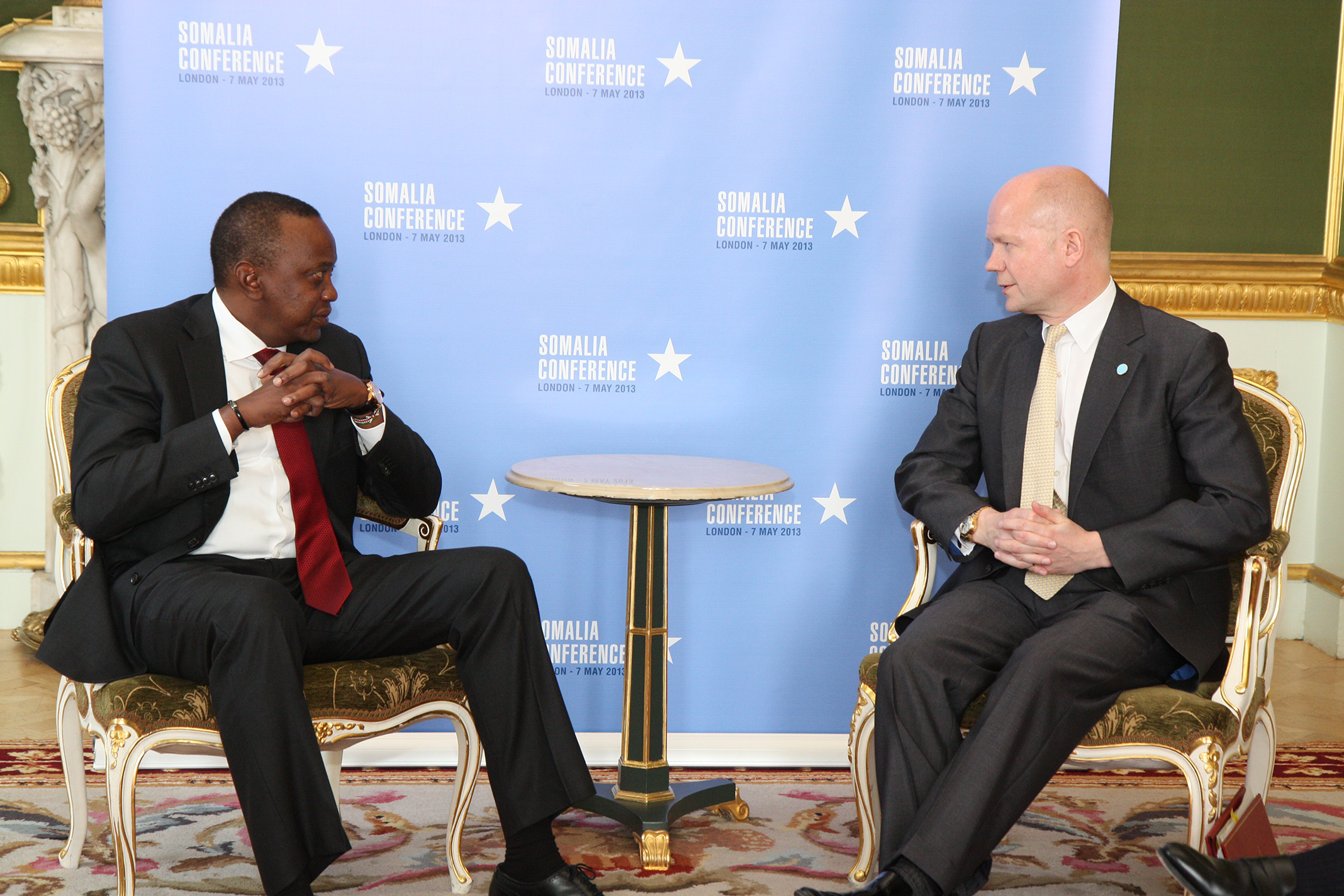
Kenyatta talking at the Somalia Conference in London 2013

Uhuru Kenyatta became President of Kenya following the following his victory in the 2013 Kenyan general election. The following is a list of presidential trips made by Uhuru Kenyatta since assuming office.

== Summary of international trips ==
Uhuru Kenyatta has made several foreign trips on four continents, with several visits around East Africa and Africa in particular.

Map showing International trips made by Kenyatta as President 1 Visit 2 Visits 3 Visits 4 Visits 5+ Visits Kenya

Number of visits	Country
1 visit	Algeria, Austria, Botswana, Burundi, Cuba, Germany, Ghana, Israel, Jamaica, Jordan, Kuwait, Malta, Mauritius, Morocco, Mozambique, Portugal, Qatar, Saudi Arabia, Singapore, Seychelles, Sweden, Switzerland, Togo, Vatican City, Zimbabwe
2 visits	Angola, Barbados, Canada, Democratic Republic of the Congo, India, Namibia, Nigeria, Russia, Turkey, UAE
3 visits	Djibouti, Italy, Japan, South Sudan, Sudan
4 visits	Belgium, China, France, Somalia
5+ visits	Ethiopia (20), Rwanda (10), South Africa (6), Tanzania (10), Uganda (11), United Kingdom (6), United States (7), Zambia (5)

== 2013 ==
The following international trips were made by Uhuru Kenyatta during 2013:

Country	Areas visited	Date(s)	Purpose(s)	Notes
Tanzania	Arusha	27 April	Summit of EAC Heads of State	See also: East African Legislative Assembly
Ethiopia	Addis Ababa	3 May	21st Extraordinary IGAD Summit	
United Kingdom	London	6 – 8 May	Somalia Conference	See also: Somali and Kenyan conflict Uhuru Kenyatta help draft a lasting solution for the Somalia conflict at the conference and then held bilateral talks with Prime Minister David Cameron. This was presidents Uhuru's first trip to a western country after his inauguration and his visit was slightly controversial in the UK as Kenyatta was under trial at the ICC after the Post election violence.
South Africa	Johannesburg	9 – 11 May	World Economic Forum	The President attended the World Economic Forum on 10 May at the Westin Grand Hotel along with various other African leaders including Jakaya Kikwete from Tanzania. After the forum, Kenyatta held bilateral talks with Jacob Zuma.
South Sudan	Juba	24 May	State Visit	See also: Kenya–South Sudan relations The president's first state visit to the neighbouring nation. The president meets Salva Kiir before they both head towards the AU conference in Addis Ababa. Salvaa Kiir supports Kenyatta's bid against the ICC.
Ethiopia	Addis Ababa	25 – 26 May	AU 50th Anniversary celebrations	See also: International Criminal Court investigation in Kenya AU legislators back Kenyatta's bid to refer his cases and his deputy William Ruto of Crimes against Humanity from the Hague to Nairobi.
Uganda	Entebbe	24 – 26 June	State Visit	See also: Kenya–Uganda relations First State visit to Uganda by the president. Also joined by Paul Kagame for closed door talks.This meeting essentially began the formation of the "collation of the willing".
Burundi	Bujumbura	1 July	State Visit	See also: Burundi–Kenya relations Kenyatta attends Burundi's 51st independence anniversary celebrations. He is accompanied by the First lady and various governmental officials.
Nigeria	Abuja	14 – 18 July	AU HIV and Aids summit	See also: Kenya–Nigeria relations Kenyatta Attends AU summit for HIV, Aids, Tuberculosis and Malaria. The president also held bilateral talks with president Goodluck Jonathan and officially opened a Kenyan Chancery in Abuja.
Democratic Republic of Congo	Kinshasa	18 July	State Visit	See also: Democratic Republic of the Congo–Kenya relations Kenyatta makes a stop on his way back from Abuja where bilateral talks were held on regional peace.
Uganda	Munyonyo	4 August	AMISON summit	Further information: African Union Mission to Somalia Summit for Heads of States of the AMISON forces in Somalia.
Russia	Moscow	16 – 19 August	State Visit	See also: Kenya–Russia relations Kenyatta talks to various Russian business to increase involvement in Kenya. The President assured business co-operation and especially urged Russian fertiliser producers to set up a factor in Kenya. Kenyatta also went to cheer for the Kenyan team at the IAAF championship.
China	Beijing	19 – 24 August	State Visit	See also: China–Kenya relations President Kenyatta visited China by the invitation of H.E. Xi Jinping with 60 Kenyan business men. China is one of Kenya's largest trading partner and various deals worth over $5 billion were signed. China agreed to build the standard gauge railway and increase energy investment.
United Arab Emirates	Dubai	25 – 27 August	State Visit	See also: Kenya–United Arab Emirates relations Trade Talks to encourage investors to go to Kenya.
Ethiopia	Addis Ababa	12 October	AU Summit	See also: International Criminal Court investigation in Kenya The African Union proposes to withdraw from the ICC and call for all cases against sitting leaders in the ICC to be deferred until the respective leaders retire from office.
Rwanda	Kigali	28 – 30 October	State Visit	See also: Kenya–Rwanda relations The president arrives for a three-day summit. The president also attends the 3rd Northern Corridor infrastructure summit. Furthermore, Kenyatta visits the Transform Africa Summit, held by the International Telecommunication union. The second summit was attended by various African leaders.
Kuwait	Kuwait City	18 – 20 November	Africa-Arab Summit	See also: Kenya–Kuwait relations Kenyatta is received at the airport by the Emir of Kuwait. Kenyatta attends the third Arab-African summit, where various regional leaders and business men assemble to increase Arab and African co-operation.
Uganda	Kampala	30 November	15th Ordinary Summit of EAC Heads of State	All heads of state meet from the East African community meet in Kampala and approve a monetary union deal.
South Africa	Johannesburg	9 - 11 December	Nelson Mandela Memorial Service	See also: Death of Nelson Mandela President Kenyatta attends the funeral of Nelson Mandela, along with various world leaders.

== 2014 ==
The following international trips were made by Uhuru Kenyatta during 2014:

Country	Areas visited	Date(s)	Purpose(s)	Notes
Angola	Luanda	15 – 16 January	State visit & 5th Summit of ICGLR Heads of State	See also: Angola–Kenya relations Kenyatta attends the summit for Peace and Security in the Great Lakes Region. Furthermore, Kenyatta holds bilateral talks with various Angolan ministries and promises to open new Kenyan Embassy in Luanda.
Ethiopia	Addis Ababa	29 January – 1 February	AU summit	22nd Extra-Ordinary summit of Heads of State. With the summit theme being "Transforming Africa's Agriculture".
Uganda	Kampala	19 – 20 February	Northern Corridor Meeting	President Uhuru Kenyatta uses his national Identity card to travel to Uganda.
South Sudan	Juba	26 February	South Sudan Crisis Meeting	Further information: South Sudanese Civil War Kenyatta makes a one-day state visit to discuss the worsening political crisis in South Sudan.
Ethiopia	Addis Ababa	10 – 11 March	State Visit	See also: Ethiopia–Kenya relations Kenyatta makes the first state visit to Ethiopia. Bilateral talks were held between both leaders and certain topics such as the South Sudan Conflict, LAPSET and various investment relations were discussed.
Tanzania	Arusha	14 March	EAC Summit	
Belgium	Brussels	2 – 3 April	Investment Summit	Kenyatta in Brussels for EU-Africa summit.
United Kingdom	London	April	Investment Summit	
Rwanda	Kigali	7 April	State Visit	Further information: Rwandan genocide Kenyatta attends the 20th Anniversary of the Rwandan genocide at the Kigali Genocide Memorial Centre.
Turkey	Ankara	10 – 13 April	State Visit	See also: Kenya–Turkey relations This was the first state visit by a Kenyan Head of state to Turkey. Bilateral talks and various trade agreements were signed. Furthermore, Kenyan opened their first embassy in Turkey.
Qatar	Doha	21 – 23 April	State Visit	See also: Kenya–Qatar relations Kenyatta makes a three-day state visit to hold bilateral talks with the Qatari leadership. He met the Qatari defence minister and the energy minister. Furthermore, he met with the Qatari business community and the Kenyan diaspora.
Nigeria	Abuja	4 – 7 May	State Visit	See also: Kenya–Nigeria relations Uhuru makes a state visit and various business and trade co-operation deals were signed.

== 2015 ==
The following international trips were made by Uhuru Kenyatta during 2015:

Country	Areas visited	Date(s)	Purpose(s)	Notes
Algeria	Algiers	24 – 26 February	State Visit	See also: Algeria–Kenya relations Uhuru Kenyatta hold bilateral talks with president Abdelaziz Bouteflika and Uhuru officially opens the Kenyan embassy in Algiers.
Rwanda	Kigali	7 March	9th Northern Corridor Summit	Uhuru kenyatta travels to Kigali for the Northern Corridor Infrastructure summit. It was attended by the heads of state of Uganda, Rwanda and South Sudan. The meeting was held to help fast-track the cross border infrastructure projects in road, rail, electricity and ICT.
Japan	Tokyo, Sendai	11 – 15 March	State Visit and World Conference of Disaster Relief	Further information: United Nations Office at Nairobi Kenyatta attends the 3rd UN World Conference on Disaster Reduction in Sendai. The President also conducts an official state visit and meets prime minister Shinzō Abe, where they discuss trade imbalances between the two countries.
Namibia	Windhoek	21 – 22 March	Inauguration of Namibian President	See also: Namibian general election, 2014 Uhuru and the first lady attend the Inauguration of the new Namibian President Hage Geingob.
Ethiopia	Bahir Dar	18 April	Regional peace summit	See also: Terrorism in Kenya On the state visit to Jordan Uhuru Kenyatta makes a stop in Ethiopia for fourth Tana High-level Forum on Security in Africa a regional peace summit, mainly concerning terrorism on the continent.
Jordan	Aqaba	18 – 23 April	Horn of Africa Coordination Meeting	Further information: Piracy off the coast of Somalia The president attends the Horn of Africa Co-ordination meeting along with various leaders from countries along the coast of Eastern Africa. Mainly regional piracy and terrorism was discussed in a closed door meeting with King Abdullah II.
United States	Los Angeles	20 – 27 April	Milken Institute Global Conference	Kenyatta makes a speech at the Milken Institute Global Conference, where Kenyatta highlighted Kenya as a gateway for business into the continent and boasted the upgrades of infrastructure, health and education in the country.
Tanzania	Dar es Salaam	13 May	EAC Burundi Crisis summit	Further information: Burundian presidential election, 2015 All East African community leaders meet in Dar es Salaam to discuss the ongoing talks to find solution to pre-election violence in Burundi.
South Africa	Pretoria, Midrand	17 May – 19 May	Pan-African Parliament	See also: Pan-African Parliament Kenyatta is received at the airport by president Jacob Zuma who attends the 6th Session of the Pan-African Parliament. Kenyatta also conducts talks with Zuma, where certain bilateral relations are discussed.
Tanzania	Dar es Salaam	31 May	EAC Summit Burundi Crisis	See also: Burundian presidential election, 2015 Leaders meet in Dar es Salaam again to conduct talks of deteriorating condition in Burundi.
Sudan	Khartoum	2 June	Omar al-Bashir Inauguration	See also: Sudanese general election, 2015 Kenyatta attends Al-Bashir's inauguration in Sudan with various other heads of state.
South Africa	Johannesburg	June	25th AU summit	Kenyatta attends AU summit with 50 other heads of state.
Zambia	Lusaka	3 – 4 July	State Visit	See also: Kenya–Zambia relations The president is received at the airport by President Edgar Lungu with a 21 gun salute. Kenyatta officially opens the 51st Zambian International Trade Fair. The president also discusses various bilateral relations between the countries in a closed door meeting.
Ethiopia	Addis Ababa	13 July	Global meet on Women Health	Kenyatta attends conference of Global Financing Facility in Support of Every Woman and Every Child. Event is also attended by Ban Ki-moon and Jim Yong Kim.
Ethiopia	Addis Ababa	27 July	South Sudan Crisis summit	See also: South Sudanese Civil War Meeting on resolving the South Sudan Crisis. The meeting is also attended by President Barack Obama of the United States.
Uganda	Kampala	8 – 10 August	State Visit	See also: Kenya–Uganda relations State visit to help improve trade and security ties between the two nations.
Ethiopia	Addis Ababa	15 – 18 August	IGAD summit on South Sudan	Regional peace summit to help facilitate peace in South Sudan.
South Sudan	Juba	26 August	IGAD summit for South Sudan War	Salva Kiir signs peace deal with rebels.
Italy	Rome, Milan	7 – 10 September	State Visit, Milan Expo	See also: Italy–Kenya relations President Kenyatta launches Kenya's new international brand at the Milan Expo. The president also held bilateral talks with the prime minister Matteo Renzi. On the final day, the president launched the "Make in Kenya" initiative.
United States	New York City	24 September – 8 October	UN General Assembly	President Kenyatta attends the 70th session of the United Nations General assembly in New York. President Kenyatta also co-chairs a panel on women empowerment with Chinese president Xi Jinping. The president also spoke at a summit on UN peace operations that is attended by several top leaders including Barack Obama.
India	New Delhi	27 – 30 October	State Visit and Africa-India Forum	See also: India–Kenya relations Kenyatta makes his maiden visit to India to attend the Third India Africa Forum Summit. The president also hold bilateral talks with Narendra Modi on Kenya-India relations.
Tanzania	Dar es Salaam	6 November	President Magufuli inauguration	See also: Tanzanian general election, 2015 Kenyatta attends the inauguration of the new Tanzania president along with various heads of state.
Malta	Valletta	28 – 30 November	Commonwealth of Nations Summit	See also: Commonwealth Heads of Government Meeting Kenyatta attends the 24th Commonwealth Heads of Government Meeting. The meeting has delegates from over 53 countries.
France	Paris	30 November – 3 December	2015 Climate change summit	See also: Conference of the parties Kenyatta attends the 21st sessions of the Conference of Parties held in Paris. Various world leaders from over 140 countries attended the event. Kenyatta submitted its new climate plan and agreed to reduce over 30% of the countries green house emissions by 2030.
South Africa	Johannesburg	3 – 5 December	FOCAC summit	See also: Forum on China–Africa Cooperation The first Forum on China-Africa Cooperation being held in Africa, Kenyatta arrives here straight from the paris conference. The president hold bilateral talks with the CCP general secretary Xi Jinping before the conference.
Rwanda	Kigali	10 – 11 December	12th Northern Corridor Summit	See also: Northern Corridor Kenyatta attends the 12th Northern Corridor summit in kigali. Talks of further integration projects were discussed and the inclusion of Ethiopia into a power sharing deal within the region.

== 2016 ==
The following international trips were made by Uhuru Kenyatta during 2016:

Country	Areas visited	Date(s)	Purpose(s)	Notes
Ethiopia	Addis Ababa	29 – 31 January	AU Summit	Various leaders attended the AU summit and Kenyatta flew to Ethiopia with president Muhammadu Buhari who ended a 3-day state visit. At the summit Kenyatta pushed for increase involvement of the AU in Somalia. Kenya was elected to be a member of the African Union Peace and Security Council for 3 years. President Kenyatta also held bilateral talks with the President of Guinea.
Israel	Jerusalem	22 – 25 February	State Visit	See also: Israel–Kenya relations Kenyatta visits various institutions in the country before he held bilateral talks with prime minister Benjamin Netanyahu. Kenyatta visits the Kenyan students studying dry-land farming in the country and also visits Wolfson Medical Center, where 20 Kenyan children received heart surgery.
Djibouti	Djibouti	28 February	AMISON Summit	See also: African Union Mission to Somalia Various regional leaders part of the AMISON forces meet in Djibouti to increase funding of the armed forces to continue their mandate.
Tanzania	Arusha	2 – 3 March	17th EAC summit	See also: East African Community Kenyatta attends the 17th EAC summit in Tanzania. All EAC leaders are present for the summit and South Sudan is admitted to the union. The leaders discuss various trade and logistic agreements and the EAC launched their first internationally recognised common passport. Furthermore, the leaders inaugurate the Tengeru -Voi highway project.
Ghana	Accra	6 – 7 March	Ghana Independence Day	See also: Ghana–Kenya relations Uhuru Kenyatta is the chief guest for the 59th Ghana Independence Day.
France	Paris	4 – 6 April	State Visit	See also: France–Kenya relations This is the first visit in 14 years where both heads of state conducted bilateral talks. The President met his French counterpart François Hollande to forge a strategic partnership against terrorism in the region. Furthermore, France pledged over 250 million euros in funds for infrastructure projects in the country. Uhuru also met with various stakeholders in the tourism industry in France to promote Kenya as a safe tourist destinations for French citizens.
Germany	Berlin	6 – 8 April	State Visit	See also: Germany–Kenya relations This was the first visit by a Kenyan head of state to Germany in 17 years. The last visit to Germany was made by Daniel arap Moi in 1999. President Kenyatta held bilateral talks with chancellor Angela Merkel regarding, security, trade and foreign investments. The president also attended the Kenya-Germany Business forum. Germany is the 4th largest foreign investors in the country and the president stressed to facilitate to increase the trade between the two countries. Furthermore, the president also attended the Renewables Academy AG (RENAC) Industrial Park and the Berlin Adlershof Science City.
Uganda	Kampala	23 April	13th Northern Corridor Integration Projects Summit	Uhuru Kenyatta meets Yoweri Museveni and Paul Kagame at the Speke resort in Kampala for the NCIP summit. Various infrastructure projects were discussed that include power generation, transmission and interconnectivity, crude oil pipeline, commodities exchange, human resource capacity building and land. In particular the Mombasa-Nairobi Standard Gauge Railway which is almost near completion was discussed for its expansion to Naivasha. Moreover, the Rwanda-South Sudan SGR feasibility was discussed.
Rwanda	Kigali	11 May	26th World Economic Forum	President Kenyatta attended the World Economic Forum and was the closer for the plenary session of the Grow Africa Investment Forum.
Uganda	Kampala	12 May	Yoweri Museveni inauguration	Further information: Ugandan general election, 2016 President Kenyatta attended the inauguration of the 5th term of Yoweri Museveni.
Zambia	Lusaka	24 May	African Development Bank 2016 annual meeting	President Kenyatta attended the African Development Bank 2016 annual meeting in Lusaka, held at the Mulungushi conference centre. The focus of the conference was on energy, climate change and youth unemployment.
Angola	Luanda	13 June	6th International Conference on the Great Lakes Region	See also: African Great Lakes President Kenyatta attended the 6th International Conference on the Great Lakes region. On the sidelines of the conference, president kenyatta held bilateral talks with president José Eduardo dos Santos. The leaders talked about eliminating trade and business barriers between the countries, easing the visa regime between the nations and to enhance the Bilateral Air Service Agreement between the nations. President Dos Santos also displayed intention to visit Kenya, later in 2016.
Belgium	Brussels	15 – 17 June	European Development Days summit and State Visit.	President Kenyatta delivered the keynote address at the European Development Days (EDD) and held bilateral talks on trade and security with various EU leaders.
Botswana	Gaborone	27 – 30 June	State Visit	See also: Botswana–Kenya relations Uhuru Kenyatta made a three-day state visit where he will meet president Ian Khama to discuss bilateral relations and trade agreements. The president's main focus of the trip was to discuss the Tripartite Free Trade Agreement and to attend the 2nd Botswana-Kenya business seminar. This is kenyatta's first visit to the country after Ian Khama, displayed his interest against the president in the International Criminal Court investigation in Kenya.
Uganda	Kampala	4 July	40th Anniversary of Entebbe hostage crisis	Kenyatta attends the anniversary of the Entebbe hostage crisis from 1976. The event is attended by various regional leaders and the prime minister of Israel, Benjamin Netanyahu. Various regional leaders also held talks on defence and security in the region.
Rwanda	Kigali	16 – 17 July	27th Ordinary African Union Summit	Kenyatta attends the 27th Ordinary AU summit held at the Kigali Convention Centre. Various issues are discussed at the AU ranging from financing and security and the ongoing crisis in South Sudan is discussed. The African Union C-10 committee also meets to discuss United Nations reforms.
Ethiopia	Addis Ababa	5 August	2nd IGAD summit on South Sudan	Kenyatta attends the 2nd Intergovernmental Authority on Development summit in Addis to discuss the recent political situation in south Sudan. The meeting was also attended by Yoweri Museveni of Uganda and Hailemariam Desalegn of Ethiopia.
Somalia	Mogadishu	13 September	28th IGAD Extra-Ordinary Summit of Heads of State and Government	Kenyatta attends the 28th IGAD Extra-Ordinary Summit of Heads of State and Government. Uhuru Kenyatta and Hassan Mohamud held bilateral talks in a hotel close to the airport. The meeting is the first international event that will host heads of states since 1991. The meeting is to discuss the presidential and parliamentary elections to be held in Somalia soon and the situation in South Sudan. This is the first visit by a Kenyan president to Somalia in 30 years.
Togo	Lomé	14 – 16 October	African Union Extraordinary Summit on Maritime Security and Safety and Development in Africa	Kenyatta attends the African Union Extraordinary Summit on Maritime Security and Safety and Development in Africa. The summit is important to Kenya to help protect its coast, from increase piracy and porous borders.
Sudan	Khartoum	30 – 31 October	State Visit	See also: Kenya–Sudan relations Kenyatta makes a 2-day state visit to Sudan to discuss bilateral relations between Sudan and Kenya. Kenyatta meets president Omar al-Bashir of Sudan at the state house. Various bilateral agreements were signed in communications, trade and oil and gas. The highlight of the meeting was African agenda to exit the International Criminal Court. Moreover, Kenyatta toured the Sudan Gold refinery company, the Sudan oil refinery company and the Sudan COFTTEA factory.
Morocco	Marrakesh	14 – 18 November	United Nations Climate Change conference	Kenyatta attends the COP22 conference on climate change.
Uganda	Kampala	20 – 21 November	Diplomats Forum	See also: Kenya–Uganda relations Kenyatta attends the annual diplomats forum in Uganda where he held bilateral talks with Yoweri Museveni and various other diplomats from Kenyan and Uganda. Kenyatta also gave the keynote speech at the event and the forum is for the business community to interact with the diplomatic community to help facilitate cross border business.

== 2017 ==
The following international trips were made by Uhuru Kenyatta during 2017:

Country	Areas visited	Date(s)	Purpose(s)	Notes
India	Ahmedabad	9 – 11 January	State Visit	See also: India–Kenya relations President Uhuru attended the inauguration of the 8th Vibrant Gujarat Global Summit 2017, as the Guest of Honor. Uhuru was joined with president Paul Kagame of Rwanda at the summit. Kenyatta also held bilateral talks with prime minister Narendra Modi and president of India Pranab Mukherjee. Bilateral talks were held to enhance collaboration in trade, healthcare, manufacturing, security, defence and Information, Communication and Technology. Kenyatta attended the Kenya-India forum. Kenyatta held talks with industry chiefs in India including automaker Tata, technology services firm Infosys, and Torrent Pharmaceuticals.
Ethiopia	Addis Ababa	28 – 31 January	28th African Union heads of state summit	President Uhuru attended the 28th African Union Heads of state meeting. The meeting was an important one for Kenya where, Kenya's Amina Mohamed was vying for the African's Unions chairman position. Uhuru kenyatta held bilateral talks with Hailemariam Desalegn, Paul Kagame, António Guterres, Hage Geingob, Nana Akufo-Addo, Roch Marc Christian Kaboré, Yoweri Museveni, Abdel Fattah el-Sisi, Patrice Trovoada and Jacob Zuma.
Somalia	Mogadishu	22 February	Inauguration of Mohamed Abdullahi Mohamed	President Uhuru attended the Inauguration of Mohamed Abdullahi Mohamed and asked all IGAD and African Union members to provide as much support as possible to keep Somalia safe.
Somalia	Dhobley	18 March	Visiting Kenya Defence Forces stations in Somalia	President Uhuru visited the troops stationed at Dhobley Military Camp in Somalia. The president praised the troops for their role in the war and keeping Kenyans safe.
United Kingdom	London	10 - 13 March	3rd Somalia Conference	President Uhuru attends the 3rd Somalia Conference. Ahead of the conference, Kenyatta met with Theresa May to discuss a trade agreement with the United Kingdom in a post Brexit UK. Various other bilateral talks were held, along with the issue on British Visas being processed in South Africa instead of Kenya.
China	Beijing	13 - 18 March	Belt and Road Initiative Forum	President Uhuru attends the Belt and Road Initiative Forum in Beijing. Kenyatta also holds bilateral talks with President Xi Jinping and Premier Li Keqiang.
Italy	Taormina	26 - 28 May	43rd G7 summit	President Kenyatta attended the 43rd G7 summit in Italy.

== 2018 ==
The following international trips were made by Uhuru Kenyatta during 2018:

Country	Areas visited	Date(s)	Purpose(s)	Notes
Ethiopia	Addis Ababa	26-30 January	AU Summit	President Kenyatta attends the 30th African Union Summit in Addis Ababa, Ethiopia.
Uganda	Kampala	22 – 24 February	EAC Summit and Retreat	President Kenyatta attended a presidential retreat on financing, infrastructure and health and a summit of the East African Community (EAC) member states in Uganda.
Cuba	Havana	14-17 March	State Visit	See also: Cuba–Kenya relations President Kenyatta heads to the Caribbean in a historic visit to the island of Cuba on Tuesday, seeking a helping hand for his healthcare policy in the Big Four Agenda.
Rwanda	Kigali	21 March	10th Extraordinary Session of the African Union Heads of State and Government Summit	President Kenyatta travels to Rwanda for continental trade deal.
Mozambique	Maputo	29 March-2 April	State Visit	See also: Kenya-Mozambique relations President Kenyatta travels to Mozambique to deepen trade and bilateral relations.
United Kingdom	London	16-22 April	Commonwealth Summit	President Uhuru Kenyatta travelled to the United Kingdom to attend the Commonwealth Heads of Government Meeting.
Canada	Quebec	6-13 June	G7 Summit	President Uhuru Kenyatta travelled to La Malbaie, Quebec, Canada where he will attend the 44th G7 Summit.
United States	Washington, D.C.	26-28 August	State Visit	See also: United States - Kenya relations Kenyatta met president Donald Trump for the first time. Defense and Security agreements were top of the agenda as the United States works with Kenya to help fight political instability in the Horn of Africa. Moreover, nearly $230 million in other commercial deals and economic agreements were inked.
China	Beijing	2-4 September	2018 Forum on China–Africa Cooperation	See also: China–Kenya relations Kenyatta attended the China-Africa Summit.
United States	New York City	24-26 September	73rd session of the United Nations General Assembly	President Uhuru Kenyatta addressed the General assembly. The president commented on the general performance of the UN and called for predictable funding Of UN Peacekeeping Operations.
Tanzania	Namanga	1 December	Namanga One-Stop Border Post launch	See also: Kenya–Tanzania relations President Uhuru Kenyatta visited the Tanzanian Kenyan border to launch the one stop border post between the two countries. The launch was also attended by Tanzanian president John Magufuli.
Austria	Vienna	17 - 18 December	High-Level Africa-Europe Forum	President Uhuru Kenyatta attended the Africa-Europe forum held in Vienna. The president discussed Kenya's advancement in the digital space across all economic sectors. The president also held bilateral talks with the president of Austria Alexander Van der Bellen. Van der Bellen gifted Kenyatta a Geospatial map of Kenya.

== 2019 ==
The following international trips were made by Uhuru Kenyatta during 2019:

Country	Areas visited	Date(s)	Purpose(s)	Notes
Ethiopia	Addis Ababa	9 - 11 February	32nd AU Summit Heads of State and Government Summit	President Kenyatta attends the 32nd African Union Heads of State Summit in Addis Ababa, Ethiopia. Kenya gets re-elected on the AU security council. President Kenyatta also hosted a meeting of world leads on African renaissance as part of the 400th anniversary of the transatlantic slave trade.
Ethiopia	Addis Ababa	1 March	State Visit	See also: Ethiopia–Kenya relations President Kenyatta made a 1 day state visit to Ethiopia along with various business delegations. Along with prime minister Abiy Ahmed they officially opened the High-Level Ethiopia and Kenya business forum.
Rwanda	Gabiro	11 March	State Visit	See also: Kenya–Rwanda relations President Kenyatta made a 1 day state visit to Gabiro, Rwanda at Rwanda's leadership retreat. The president called for deeper relationship between the two countries.
Namibia	Windhoek	21 - 23 March	State Visit	See also: Kenya–Namibia relations President Kenyatta attended the 29th Namibian Independence day celebrations. The president was awarded Namibia's highest honor First Class of the Order of the Welwitschia. Post celebrations Kenyatta toured various facilities in the capital to help boost business relations.
Mauritius	Port Louis	9 - 12 April	State Visit	See also: Kenya–Mauritius relations President Kenyatta made a four day state visit to Mauritius to attend the Kenya-Mauritius Business forum. Kenyatta met with prime minister Pravind Jugnauth and held bilateral talks with the delegation. Agreements such as Double Taxation Avoidance Agreement (DTAA); an Investment Promotion and Protection Agreement (IPPA); and an MOU on Cooperation for the Development of Special Economic Zones (SEZs) and Export Processing Zone in Kenya were signed. Furthermore, the ban of Kenyan farm exports to Mauritius was lifted.
China	Beijing	24 - 26 April	2nd Belt and Road Forum for International Cooperation	See also: China–Kenya relations President Kenyatta attended the 2nd Belt and Road Forum in Beijing. The president held bilateral talks with Chinese president Xi Jinping and mainly discussed infrastructure funding and debt restructuring. Kenya walked away with increase access of Kenyan agricultural goods to china and $666m in infrastructure funding.
Rwanda	Kigali	11 May	Transform Africa Summit 2019	President Kenyatta the Transform Africa Summit 2019 in Kigali to discuss digital transformation in Africa.
Canada	Vancouver	3 - 6 June	Global Conference on Women and Girls	President Kenyatta attends the Global Conference on Women and Girls. Kenyatta also meets with Prime Minister Justin Trudeau on the sidelines to discuss gender issues in Africa.
Zambia	Livingstone	26 - 27 July	Zamiba National Economic Summit	See also: Kenya–Zambia relations President Kenyatta attended the National Economic Summit in Zambia per the invitation of Edgar Lungu. The event was also attended by former president of Tanzania Jakaya Kikwete.
Jamaica	Kingston	5 - 8 August	State Visit	See also: Jamaica–Kenya relations President Kenyatta visited Jamaica in a historic state visit to the Caribbean. The president met Jamaican prime minister Andrew Holness and held various bilateral talks on his 3-day state visit. Along with various MoUs being signed, the two leaders discussed establishing air transport connections between the two countries to help strengthen economic ties.
Barbados	Bridgetown	8 - 10 August	State Visit	See also: Barbados–Kenya relations President Kenyatta visited Barbados on the second leg of his Caribbean visit. Kenyatta held bilateral talks to boost trade relations with Prime Minister Mia Mottley.
Sudan	Khartoum	17 August	State Visit	President Kenyatta met with regional leaders in Khartoum to witness the signing of the pact that will establish a transitional government in Sudan following the year long Sudanese Revolution.
Japan	Yokohama	26 - 28 August	7th Tokyo International Conference on African Development	President Kenyatta attended the seventh TICAD conference along with 30 other heads of state. During the visit, Kenyatta held bilateral talks with Prime Minister Shinzo Abe to discuss the various infrastructure projects Japan is involved in within Kenya.
Zimbabwe	Harare	14 September	Robert Mugabe Funeral	President Kenyatta attended the funeral of ex-Zimbabwean president Robert Mugabe who died in Singapore.
Singapore	Singapore	19 - 21 September	State Visit	See also: Kenya–Singapore relations President Kenyatta conducted a 3 day state visit to Singapore. Kenyatta gave an address at the Singapore Summit 2019. Kenyatta also met with Prime Minister Lee Hsien Loong and representatives from the Housing & Development Board and the Port of Singapore Authority.
United States	New York City	22-26 September	74th session of the United Nations General Assembly	President Uhuru Kenyatta addressed the UN General assembly.
Ethiopia	Addis Ababa	11 October	State Visit	President Kenyatta made a day trip to Addis to join Prime Minister Abiy Ahmed inaugurate the Unity Park Museum.
Japan	Tokyo	22 October	Naruhito Coronation	President Kenyatta attended the 2019 Japanese Imperial ceremony among 170 other world leaders.
Russia	Sochi	23 - 24 October	First Russia-Africa Summit	See also: Kenya–Russia relations President Uhuru Kenyatta attended the first Russia Africa summit in Sochi along with 43 other heads of states or governments from Africa.
Saudi Arabia	Riyadh	29 - 30 October	Future Investment Initiative 2019	President Kenyatta was a keynote speaker at the Future Investment Initiative conference. The president urged the gulf countries to invest in Kenya to reestablish historical business relations. Kenyatta also held bilateral talks with the King Abdullah II of Jordan on the sidelines.

== 2020 ==
The following international trips were made by Uhuru Kenyatta during 2020:

Country	Areas visited	Date(s)	Purpose(s)	Notes
United Kingdom	London	20 - 22 January	State Visit	See also: Kenya–United Kingdom relations President Kenyatta launched Kenya's first green bond on the London Stock Exchange. The $40m bond was issued by a Kenyan company Acorn Holdings, and becomes the first Kenya shilling corporate green bond to be listed in the United Kingdom. Kenyatta also met with Prime Minister Boris Johnson.
United States	Washington, D.C.	5 - 7 February	State Visit	See also: Kenya–United States relations President Kenyatta made with President Donald Trump at the white house to sign a new trade agreement with the United States. Trade between the two countries is valued at approximately $1bn annually. Moreover, an agreement was signed to allow 42 select Kenyan investigators to receive counterterrorism training at FBI headquarters.
France	Paris	1 - 3 October	State Visit	See also: France–Kenya relations President Kenyatta made his first foreign trip after the self imposed pause following the start of the COVID-19 pandemic. The three day state visit was to strengthen economic ties with France, and to encourage continued investment of France in Kenya. Kenyatta also met with French president Emmanuel Macron where they signed various infrastructure agreements. The first agreement was with Vinci SA to build and operate the Nairobi–Nakuru–Mau Summit Highway, the second included the development of the Nairobi CBD and the final was to construct a Light Rail from Jomo Kenyatta International Airport. The two also discussed increase Kenyan exports of fruits and vegetables into France.
Vatican City		6 November	State Visit	See also: Catholic Church in Kenya President Kenyatta made a special trip to the Vatican City for a special meeting with Pope Francis.
Italy	Rome	7 November	State Visit	See also: Italy–Kenya relations President Kenyatta met with Italian president Sergio Mattarella after concluding his official visit at the Vatican City. Trade, tourism and investment between the two countries was discussed.
Djibouti	Djibouti	20 December	38th IGAD Extra-Ordinary Summit of Heads of State and Government	Kenyatta attends the 38th IGAD Summit. The focus of the summit was the ongoing Tigray War and the Kenyan-Somalian deteriorating relations.

== 2021 ==
The following international trips were made by Uhuru Kenyatta during 2021:

Country	Areas visited	Date(s)	Purpose(s)	Notes
Tanzania	Dodoma	22 March	John Magufuli funeral	President Kenyatta attended the funeral of the late Tanzanian President John Magufuli. Kenyatta gave a speech on behalf of all East African leaders.
Democratic Republic of Congo	Kinshasa	20 - 22 April	State Visit	President Kenyatta made a 3 day official state visit to Kinshasa. The president and delegation met with various business people from DRC and discussed cross border investment opportunities. Kenyatta met with his DRC counterpart Félix Tshisekedi and discussed Kenya opening consulates in Goma and Lubumbashi, and DRC opening a consulate in Mombasa. Kenya is looking to woo more DRC business people to use the Mombasa port to import goods with the increase in regional competition. As Kenyatta is the current president of the East African Community, DRC's membership was discussed. The president also attended the opening ceremony of Equity Bank's Kinshasa branch.
Uganda	Kampala	12 May	Yoweri Museveni inauguration	See also: 2021 Ugandan general election President Kenyatta attended the inauguration of president Museveni following his win in the 2021 Ugandan general election.
Djibouti	Djibouti	15 May	Ismaïl Omar Guelleh inauguration	See also: 2021 Djiboutian presidential election President Kenyatta attended the inauguration of president Guelleh following his win in the 2021 Djiboutian presidential election.
Ethiopia	Addis Ababa	8 - 9 June	State Visit	See also: Telecommunications in Ethiopia President Kenyatta made a day trip to Ethiopia to witness the issuance of a telecom license to the telecom consortium led by Kenyan company Safaricom.
Turkey	Antalya	18 - 19 June	State Visit	President Kenyatta made the first ever state visit to Turkey by a Kenyan president. Kenyatta was invited by Turkish president Recep Erdoğan. Kenyatta attended the Antalya Diplomacy Forum and held bilateral talks with delegates from both countries.
Belgium	Brussels	21 - 22 June	State Visit	President Kenyatta is hosted by King Philippe of Belgium on his two day state visit. Kenyatta attends the Belgium-Kenya business forum and delegates from both countries discuss bilateral trade.
France	Paris	30 June - 1 July	State Visit	See also: France–Kenya relations President Kenyatta met with president Emmanuel Macron to further discuss infrastructure projects that are funded by France in Kenya.
Zambia	Lusaka	2 July	Kenneth Kaunda funeral	See also: Kenya–Zambia relations President Kenyatta attended the state funeral of Zambia's first president Kenneth Kaunda.
United Kingdom	London	28 - 30 July	Global Education Summit	President Kenyatta co-hosted along with Prime Minister Boris Johnson the Global Education Summit in London. Other than the summit the UK committed more vaccines to Kenya through the COVAX program.
Zambia	Lusaka	24 August	Inauguration of Hakainde Hichilema	See also: 2021 Zambian general election President Kenyatta attended the inauguration of the newly elected president of Zambia Hakainde Hichilema.
Ethiopia	Addis Ababa	4 October	Inauguration of Abiy Ahmed	See also: 2021 Ethiopian general election President Kenyatta made a day trip to Ethiopia to witness the second inauguration of Prime Minister Abiy Ahmed.
Barbados	Bridgetown	5 - 7 October	United Nations Conference on Trade and Development 15	See also: Barbados–Kenya relations President Kenyatta visited Barbados to attend the UNCTAD 15, Prime Minister Mia Mottley officially took over the leadership of the commission. Kenyatta was also awarded the Order of Freedom of Barbados by Governor General Sandra Mason.
United States	New York City, Washington, D.C.	11 - 15 October	State Visit	See also: Kenya–United States relations President Kenyatta made with President Joe Biden, to be the first African head of state to meet Biden at the white house. A range of economic and security issues were discussed. Biden requested that Kenya use its influence to settle the ongoing Tigray conflict in Ethiopia. Kenyatta also met with UN Secretary General António Guterres to discuss the ongoing conflict in Ethiopia.
Ethiopia	Addis Ababa	14 November	State Visit	President Kenyatta made a day trip to Ethiopia to help broker peace between the warning sides in the year long Tigray War.
South Africa	Pretoria, Eastern Cape	22 - 24 November	State Visit	See also: Kenya–South Africa relations President Kenyatta made a state visit to South Africa per the invitation of president Cyril Ramaphosa. The two presidents discussed diplomatic and trade relations. Both presidents also acknowledged the signing of the Strategic Partnership Framework between South African Airways and Kenya Airways.
Tanzania	Dar es Salaam	9 - 10 December	State Visit	See also: Kenya–Tanzania relations President Kenyatta visited Tanzania to attend the 60th Independence day celebrations of Tanganyika. Kenyatta has made several visits to Tanzania on multilateral visits but is first bilateral visit to the country. Kenyatta and President Samia will witness the signing of the agreements of eight contracts.

== 2022 ==
The following international trips were made by Uhuru Kenyatta in 2022.

Country	Areas visited	Date(s)	Purpose(s)	Notes
Ethiopia	Addis Ababa	5 - 6 February	35th Ordinary session of the African Union	President Kenyatta led the Kenyan delegation at the AU.
United Arab Emirates	Dubai, Abu Dhabi	14 - 16 February	Kenya National Day Inauguration at Expo 2020	Uhuru Kenyatta held a 3 day work visit to the UAE. He met with Kenyan business community and the prince of Abu Dhabi. On 16 February he led the flag raising ceremony launching Kenya day at the Dubai Expo 2020.
Belgium	Brussels	18 - 20 February	Africa-Europe Summit	Uhuru Kenyatta attended the Africa-Europe summit in Brussels. The main topic of discussion was the Covid-19 pandemic and the technology transfer of mRNA vaccines to Africa.
Switzerland	Bern	19 - 21 May	State Visit	See also: Kenya-Switzerland relations Uhuru Kenyatta met with the president of the Swiss Confederation Ignazio Cassis and held bilateral talks. The president commissioned a Kenyan chancery in Bern to help facilitate business conversations between Swiss and Kenyan companies.
Sweden	Stockholm	2 - 3 June	Stockholm+50 International environment meeting	Kenyatta attended the Stockholm+50 International environment meeting along with various other world leaders.
Somalia	Mogadishu	9 June	Hassan Sheikh Mohamud Inauguration	See also: Kenya-Portugal relations Kenyatta attended the inauguration of Somali president Hassan Sheik Mohamud.
Rwanda	Kigali	24 - 25 June	26th Meeting of the Heads of Government of the Commonwealth of Nations	Uhuru Kenyatta visited Rwanda for the 2022 Commonwealth Heads of Government Meeting.
Portugal	Lisbon	27 - 29 June	UN Ocean Conference 2022, State Visit	See also: Kenya-Portugal relations Kenyatta first attended the UN Ocean Conference on Climate and chaired the African Union Committee of African Heads of State and Government on Climate Change (CAHOSCC). After the visit, Uhuru Kenyatta met with the president of Portugal Marcelo Rebelo de Sousa and held bilateral talks and signed various MOUs to increase business between the two nations. On 29 June, Kenyatta launched the Kenya-Portugal Business Forum.
Seychelles	Mahé, Vallée de Mai	17 - 19 July	State Visit	See also: Kenya-Seychelles relations Seychelles and Kenya signed 10 bilateral agreements to increase co-operation between the two countries. Kenyatta met with President Wavel Ramkalawan and toured around various sites in the Seychelles. He also made a visit to the UNESCO heritage site of Vallée de Mai.
Tanzania	Arusha	21 - 22 July	22nd EAC Ordinary summit	Kenyatta attended the EAC summit held in Tanzania focused on regional integration. Before the summit, Kenyatta inaugurated the 42.4km Arusha Bypass road linking to the Kenyan border.

== See also ==
- List of international presidential trips made by William Ruto, his successor
