= Lycée Denis Diderot (Kenya) =

French international school in Nairobi, Kenya

French School of Nairobi
- Lycée Denis Diderot
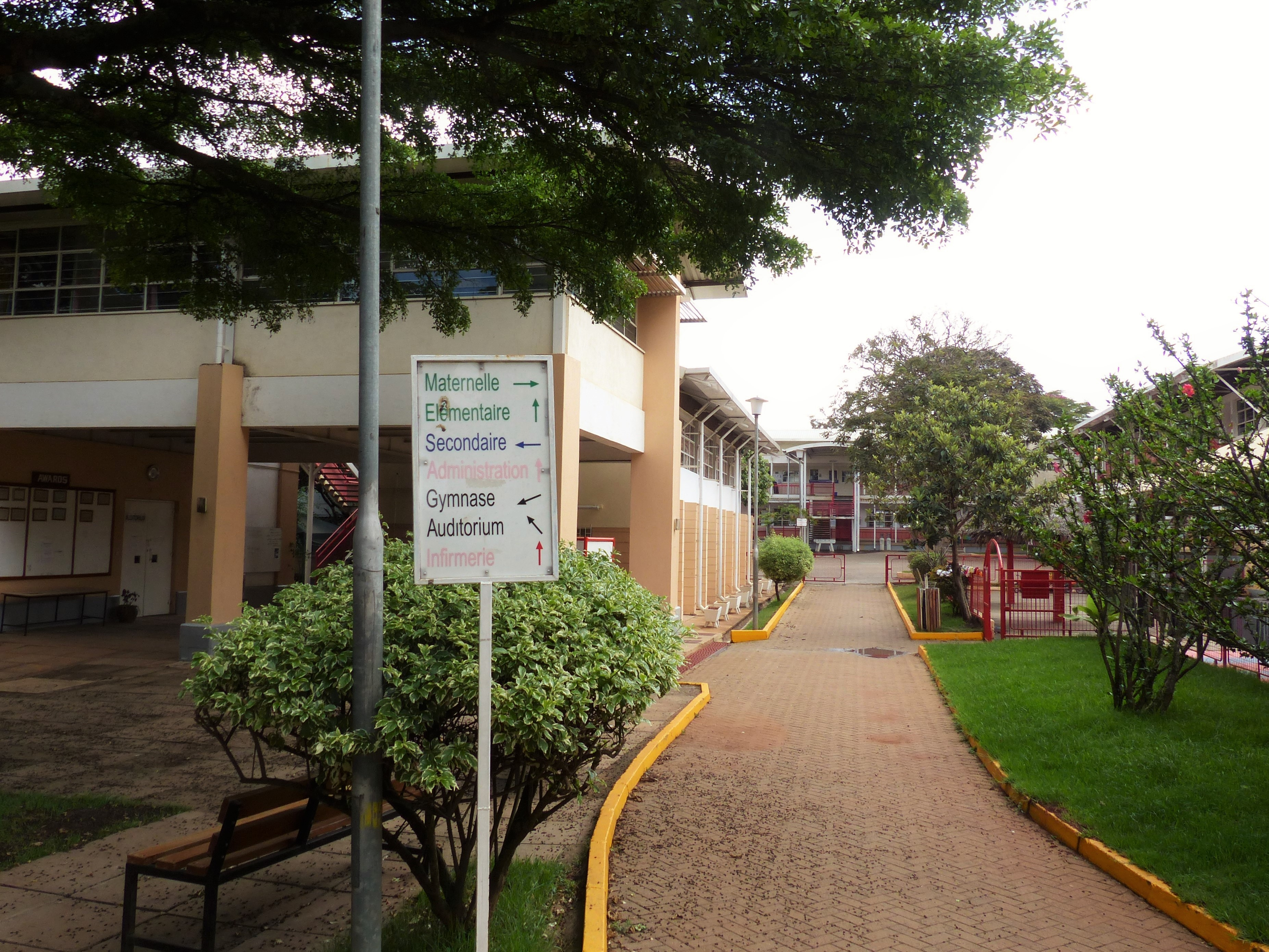
- Lycée Denis Diderot, Nairobi

Location
- Argwings Kodhek Road Kilimani (next to Yaya Center) - 00100 Nairobi GPO; 1.29422222°S 36.78915833°E

Information
- Type: French international school
- Established: 1962
- Headmaster: Alexandre LOUBEYERE
- Website: www.diderot.ac.ke

The French School of Nairobi, also known as the Lycée Denis Diderot (LDD), is the French international school in Kenya. It is located in the district of Kilimani, in Nairobi. It is part of Agency for French Education Abroad (AEFE) network.

Opened in 1962 in Westlands as École française à Nairobi, it moved to its current campus in 1972. In 1989 the school was named the Collège Denis Diderot, and it is in 1995 that it received its current name

It includes kindergarten through secondary school education, which includes high school.

The Lycée Denis Diderot is involved in numerous academic, sport and cultural events at local and international levels: rugby competitions, art project La Grande Lessive. Kenyan, French and foreign personalities like Sam Cambio, Maddo or Tabu Osusa are regularly invited for projects with the students.

== See also ==
- France–Kenya relations
