= Lycée Denis Diderot =

Lycée Denis Diderot may refer to:

- Lycée Denis Diderot (Kenya) - Nairobi, Kenya
- Lycée Denis Diderot (Carvin) - Carvin, France
