= Kenya–Zambia relations =

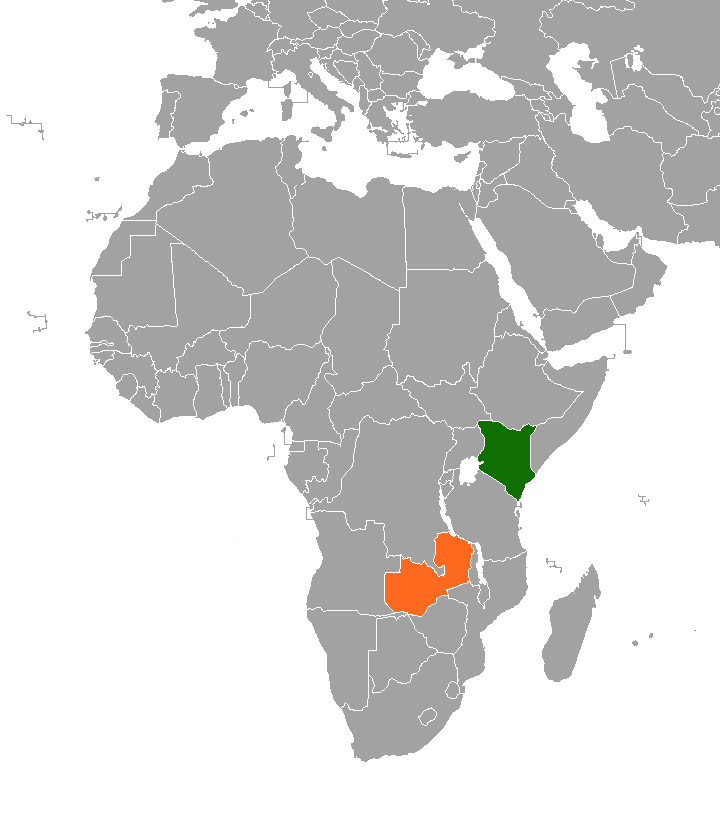
- Kenya: Zambia

Kenya–Zambia relations are bilateral relations between Kenya and Zambia. Zambia is a partner of Kenya in many areas particularly trade, energy and agriculture. Both countries are members of the Commonwealth of Nations, African Union, and Non-Aligned Movement.

== History ==
Kenya and Zambia have generally enjoyed warm relations. They cooperate in areas such as agriculture, tourism, information and communication and education. They have also signed an MOU on science, technology and innovation.

The first Joint Permanent Commission for Cooperation that was signed by the presidents of the two countries on 8 September 1982.

== Presidential visits ==
President Uhuru Kenyatta visited Zambia in July 2015 on the invitation of President Edgar Lungu of Zambia.

President Hakainde Hichilema visited Kenya in June 2022 for a state visit.

== Trade ==
Zambia has on numerous occasions accused Kenya of blocking Zambian made goods, particularly sugar. Zambia has on occasion retaliated by blocking all Kenyan made goods from Zambia. At one time Zambia refused to allow palm oil from Kenya citing that the goods didn't meet the 35% local content. Kenyan processed milk was also not allowed into Zambia at a time as Zambian officials had concerns with standards. Both countries are part of COMESA which is a free trade area aimed at promoting intra-African trade.

Kenya exports edible oils, margarines, iron sheets, steel pipes and products, detergents, baking powder, kitchen and table wares, spices, blankets, beauty products, toiletries, irrigation pumps, tyres, and textiles and crafts to Zambia.

Kenya's top imports from Zambia include copper wire or refined, maize seed, electric conductors, butane, LPG, waste and scrap primary cells, crude vegetable material, pig iron, asbestos and ferro silicon.

Kenya exported goods worth $72.7 million to Zambia in 2011, whereby trade had increased by 31% from 2010. Zambian exported good worth $65.5 million to Kenya in the same year.

=== Energy ===
Both countries signed an MOU to interconnect their national grids along with Tanzania. The deal was aimed at connecting Eastern Africa's power grid to that of the Southern Africa. The deal is worth $1.2 billion.

=== FDI ===
Kenyan investors in Zambia include Kenya Airways, Davis and Shirtliff, KenolKobil and Mastermind Tobacco.

== Diplomatic missions ==
- Zambia maintains a high commission in Nairobi.
- Kenya also maintains a high commission in Lusaka.
