= Maddo =

Kenyan comic strip artist and caricaturist

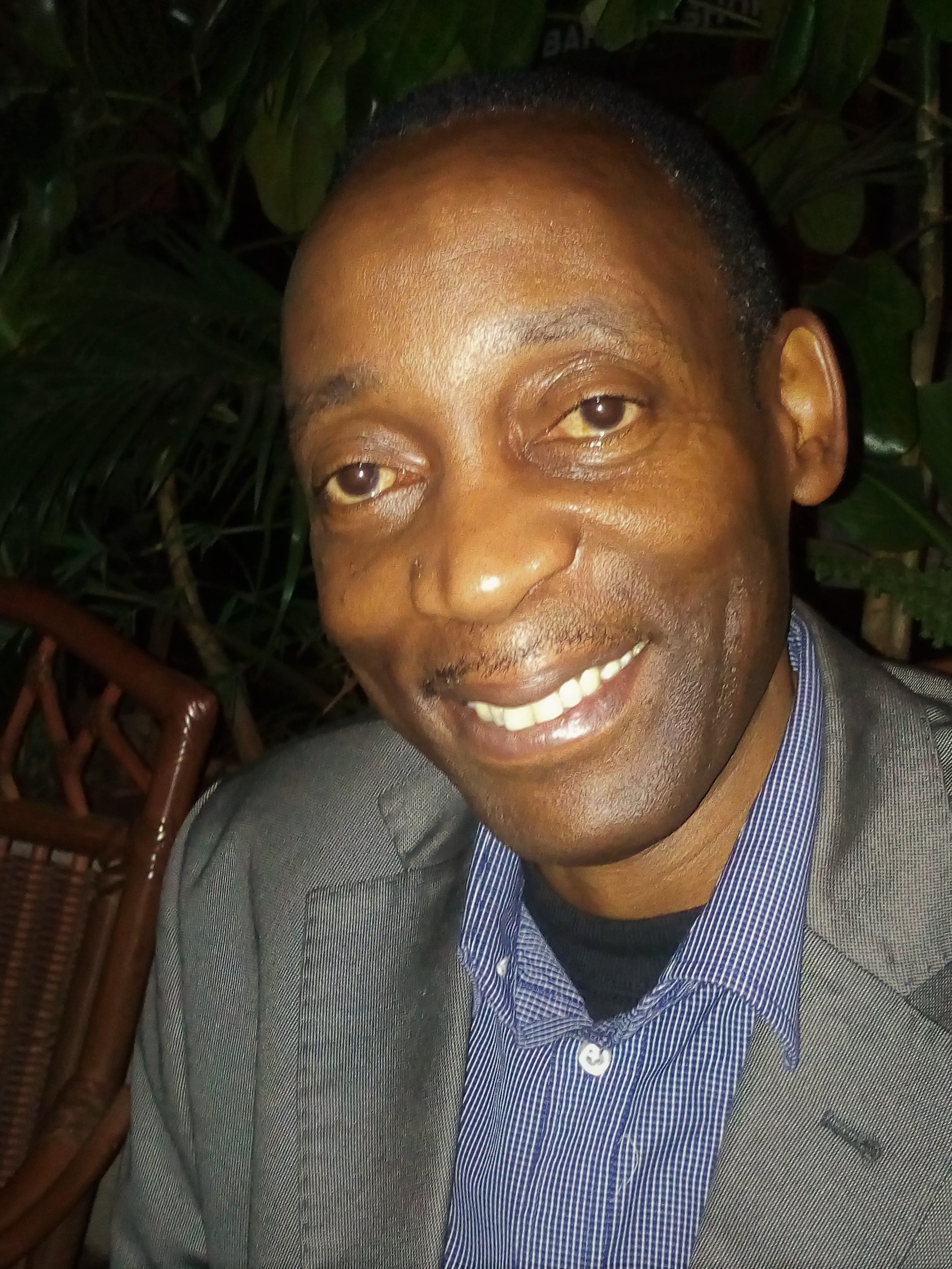
- Maddo in Nairobi, in April 2018
- Born: Paul Kelemba; 25 June 1962 (age 64) Nairobi, Kenya
- Area: Cartoonist
- Pseudonym: Maddo

Paul Kelemba (born 26 June 1962, in Nairobi), is a Kenyan self-taught comic strip artist and caricaturist. He uses Maddo as a pen-name which was inspired by Mad Magazine of New-York.

== Career ==
After completing his education, Paul Kelemba started off at a local advertising agency in Mombasa and later worked for various Kenyan magazines, including Coastweek and Daily Nation, as an illustrator and cartoonist through the 1980s and 90s. .

Since 1992, Maddo is the author of the weekly satyrical page It's a Madd Madd World in The Standard (Kenya). In 2009, he compiled his It's a Madd Madd World features into three volumes during a one-month residency at the Rockefeller Foundation Bellagio Center in Italy.

His international recognition includes residencies in Japan, Estonia and Germany.

Maddo is the recipient of the 2015 CNN Multi-Choice African Journalist Awards. Maddo is associate producer at Buni Media Ltd, the producer of The XYZ Show that was inspired by the French programme Les Guignols. He is also the chairman of Ketebul Music, a pilot music production organisation in Kenya run by Tabu Osusa.
