= Italy–Kenya relations =

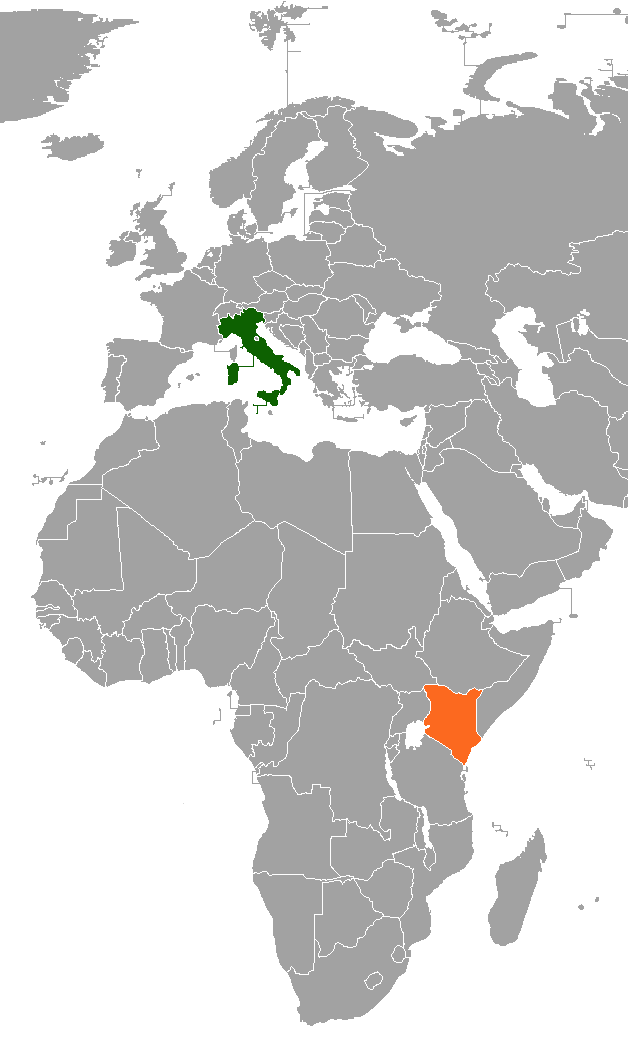
- Italy: Kenya

This article discusses bilateral relations between Kenya and Italy.

== History ==
Relations between both countries remain cordial. In 1902 the first Italian missionaries came to Kenya.

The Italian Foreign Minister, Franco Frattini visited Kenya in 2010. The Prime Minister of Kenya visited Italy in 2009. The Kenyan Cabinet Secretaries for Treasury and Agriculture have also visited Italy.

In July 2015, Prime Minister of Italy Matteo Renzi made a two-day official visit to Nairobi. There he held bilateral talks with President Uhuru Kenyatta which mainly concerned collaborative efforts by both countries on the war on terror and investments in Kenya.

== Development cooperation ==
Even though both countries had ties in the 1930s, deeper ties with the signing of an agreement in 1985. The agreement was the first bilateral agreement between Kenya and Italy, it covered cooperation in the technical, economic and development. Between 1985 and 2010 Kenya has received KES. 16.7 billion (EUR. 160 million) as development assistance from Italy and KES. 5.2 billion (EUR. 50 million) in soft loans.

Key areas for Kenya and Italian cooperation are:

- Health
- Water
- Natural Resources and Environment
- Urban Development

In 2011, more than 50 students went to study in Italy, the number is expected to increase. There's an Italian Institute of Culture in Nairobi, Kenya.

=== San Marco Project ===
The project is an initiative by the Italian government to increase space exploration. In Kenya both countries have cooperated to create the Broglio Space Centre in Malindi, Kilifi County. The Space Centre has been active since 1964.

== Economic relations ==
In 1996 both countries signed the agreement on the promotion and protection of investments.

Kenya exports goods worth KES. 3.5 billion (EUR. 33 million) to Italy annually. In addition, Italy exports goods worth KES. 9.4 billion (EUR. 89.3 million).

Italy is Kenya's third largest tourist market in Europe after Germany and France. 82,000 Italian tourists visited Kenya in 2013.

Kenya is considered an access point to East African markets and one of Italy's primary export markets in Africa.

== Diplomatic missions ==
Kenya has an embassy in Rome. It is also accredited to Greece, Poland, Cyprus and Malta. Italy has an embassy in Nairobi.

== See also ==
- Foreign relations of Italy
- Foreign relations of Kenya
