= Ethiopia–Kenya relations =

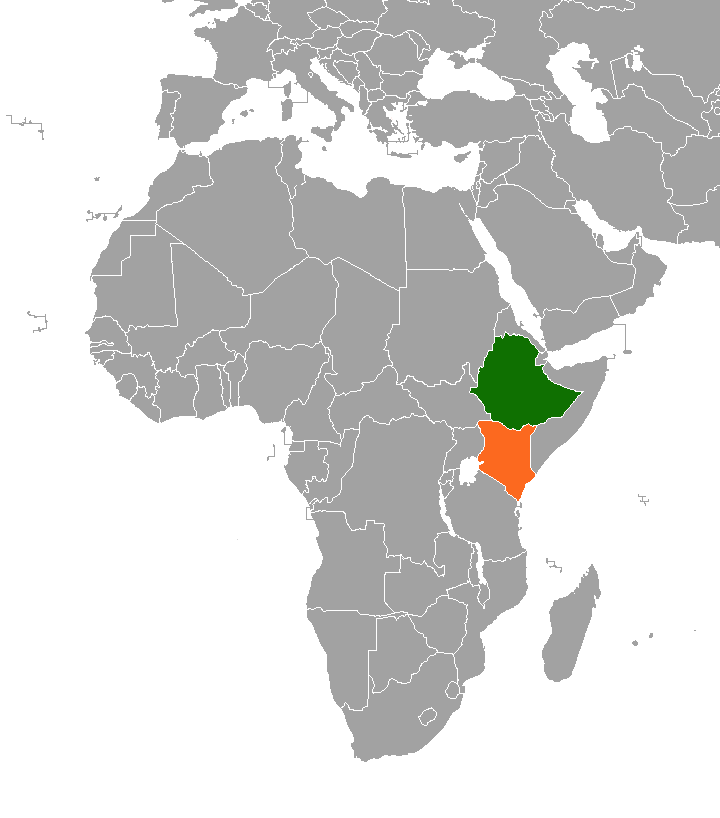

- Ethiopia: Kenya

Ethiopia–Kenya relations are bilateral relations between Ethiopia and Kenya. The two nations maintain primarily trade ties.

== Overview ==
Ethiopia first established ties with the British colonial administration in the East Africa Protectorate in 1907, when the Ethiopia-Kenya border was initially defined. The boundary was further clarified in 1947, and then formally demarcated in 1950–1955.

In 1954, Ethiopia established an Honorary Consulate General in Kenya, formally establishing ties between it and the colonial administration.

During Ethiopia's occupation by Italy, Ethiopian forces operated in British Kenyan territory, where they retrieved supplies. The Kenyan rebel group Mau Mau also operated within Ethiopian territory during the former's struggle for independence.

In 1961, while Kenya was still a British colony, Ethiopia appointed its first Ambassador to Kenya. Kenya opened an embassy in Addis Ababa six years later.

In 1964 the two countries signed a defence pact which has remained in force to this date against Somalia for the Somali inhabited territories currently in Ethiopia and Kenya respectively.

After Kenya's independence, a Joint Inter-Ministerial Consultative Committee reviewed the boundary between both nations. A treaty to this effect was subsequently signed in 1970.

== State visits ==
President Kenyatta visited Addis Ababa in early 2019 with a trade delegation at the two day Kenya-Ethiopia High Level Trade and Investment Forum. The tour involved a visit to Hawassa Industrial Park.

Prime Minister Abiy visited Nairobi in May 2018 and held talks with President Kenyatta. The leaders established a Bi-National Commission, it is the highest level of structured bilateral cooperation that Kenya has with any country. Both leaders also discussed security particularly anti-terrorism and Somalia's current situation.

President of Ethiopia Sahle-Work Zewde visited Nairobi in mid-2019 and held talks with President Kenyatta.

== Cooperation ==
As part of the talks held between the leaders of Ethiopia and Kenya in 2018 key areas of cooperation were agreed upon. Those key areas were agriculture, tourism, joint military training and transport and infrastructure particularly the LAPSSET Corridor, the Ethiopia-Kenya interconnection transmission line and the Moyale Joint City and Economic Zone.

Other things included were strengthening of cooperation between national carriers Ethiopian Airlines and Kenya Airways.

Ethiopia and Kenya are security partners as part of the AMISOM Mission in Somalia.

== Trade and development ==
Ethiopia and Kenya maintain trading ties. Both countries are members of the IGAD trade bloc.

However, commerce is largely unidirectional, with Ethiopia mainly importing products from Kenya. In 2012, Ethiopia exported $4 million worth of goods to Kenya, while Kenya exported $54 million in commodities to Ethiopia.

In 2012, the countries signed a Special Status Agreement. The deal stipulates that both parties are permitted to open representative offices in each other's territory for trade facilitation, information sharing and liaison purposes. The Ethiopian Parliament later approved the treaty in April 2014.

Additionally, the Ethiopian and Kenyan governments have invested in cross-border infrastructure. The Addis Ababa-Nairobi road project was launched in 2012. It was meant to tarmac the 505 km section between Isiolo and Moyale on the frontier. The highway project is slated for completion in 2015.

In 2016, the two countries agreed to build an oil pipeline that would run from the Kenyan port of Lamu to the Ethiopian capital, Addis Ababa. This would be one of various infrastructural projects on which the two countries would work together.

== Diplomatic missions ==
- Ethiopia has an embassy in Nairobi.
- Kenya has an embassy in Addis Ababa.
