= Barbados–Kenya relations =

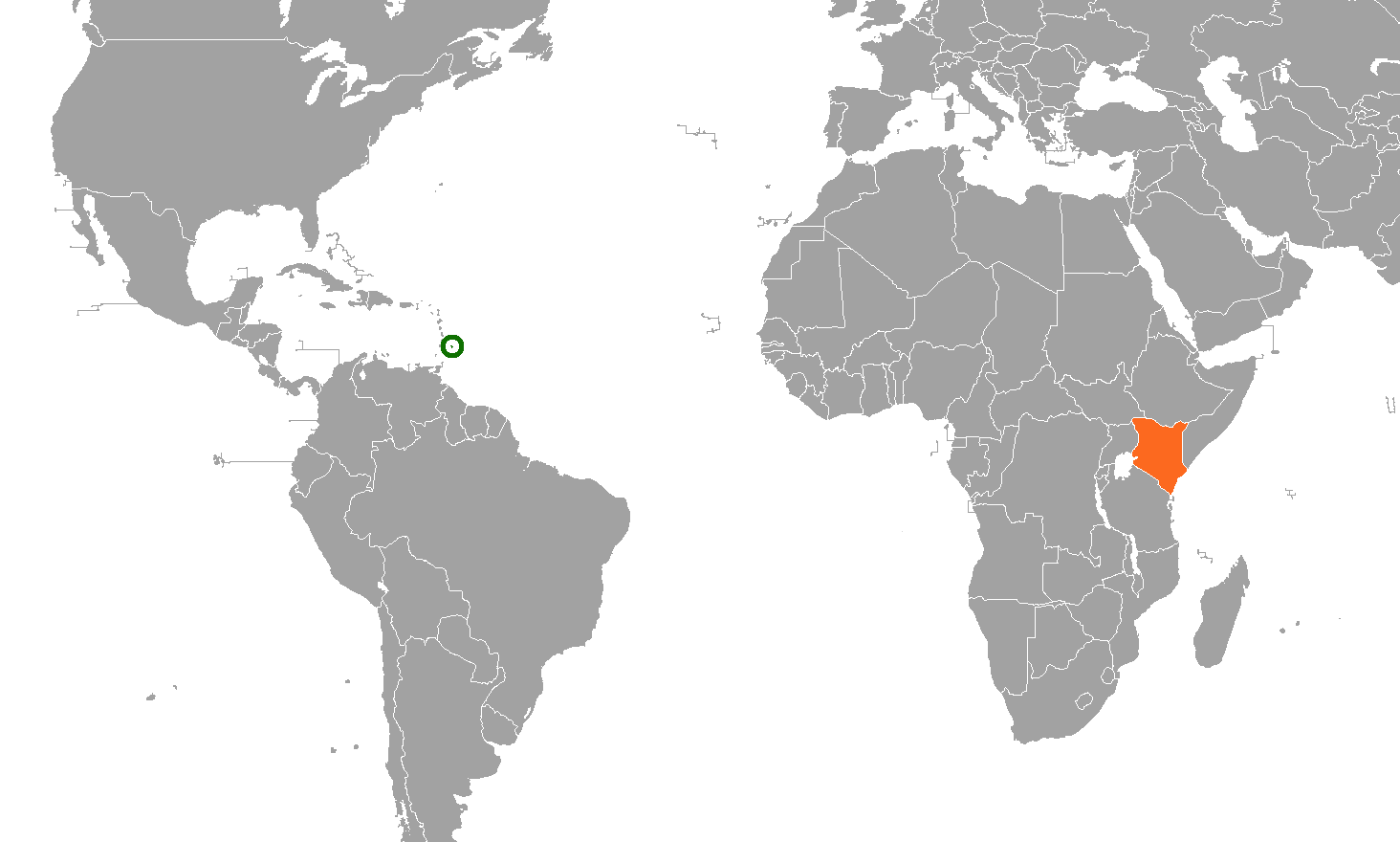
- Barbados: Kenya

Barbados–Kenya relations are bilateral relations between Barbados and Kenya. Both countries are members the African, Caribbean and Pacific Group of States and the Commonwealth of Nations.

== History ==
Prime Minister Mottley visited Kenya in late 2019 for the ACP Summit in Nairobi. President Kenyatta had visited Barbados in August 2019 as well. Mottley and Kenyatta held talks concerning deepening relation and trade between both nations.

== Cooperation ==
During Mottley's visit to Kenya both countries entered into cooperation agreements covering:

- Finance: Where both Central Banks signed agreements
- Education: Involving Barbadians studying in Kenyan schools and vice versa
- Transport: Where both countries were to find ways to get direct air and sea links

Barbados and Kenya resolved to work together in the fields of: renewable energy, tourism, health, education, blue economy, Information and Communication Technology (ICT), sports, culture, trade and investment.

An MOU establishing a Joint Commission for Cooperation (JCC) was also signed.

== Trade ==
As part of Prime Minister's Mottley's visit a focus on trade and investment between Barbados and Kenya was brought up. Barbados and Kenya were looking into entering a double taxation agreement and a bilateral investment treaty to grow trade ties.

== Diplomatic missions ==
During Prime Minister's Mottley's visit in late 2019 she opened the CARICOM office in Nairobi, Kenya which will be a joint diplomatic mission for Caribbean countries.
