= Kenya–Uganda relations =

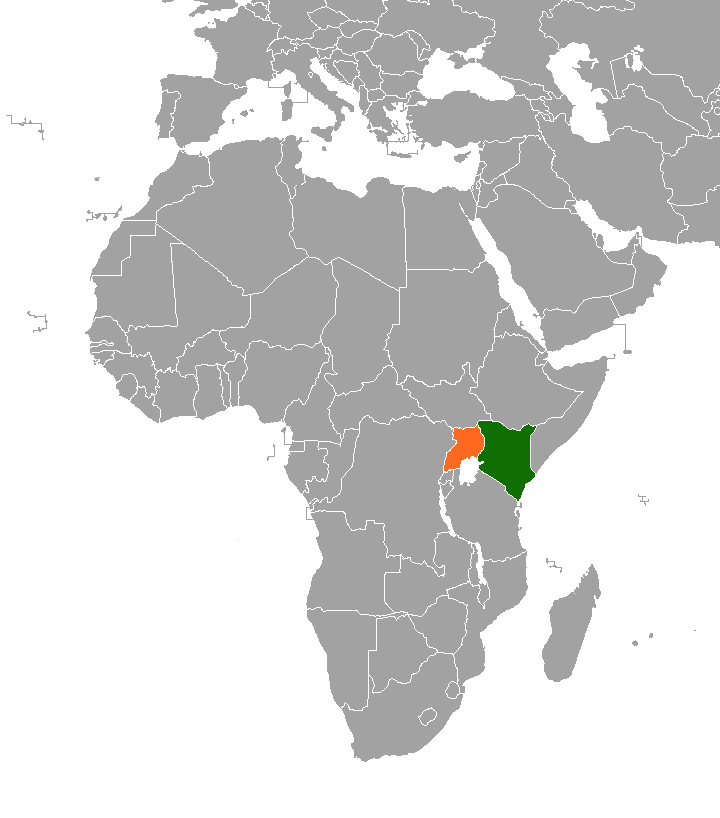
- Kenya: Uganda

Kenya–Uganda relations are bilateral relations between Kenya and Uganda. The two African Great Lakes countries are partners in many areas, particularly in the trade, infrastructure, security (military), education, agriculture, and energy sectors.

== History ==
From 1961 to 1965, the two states along with Tanzania were united in the East African Common Services Organization, a common market with a loose federal structure. Kenya and Uganda were also founding members of the original East African Community (EAC), which later collapsed due to ideological differences and territorial disputes within itself.

On 7 July 2000, Kenya, Uganda, and Tanzania reestablished the EAC. It has contributed a great deal in improving trade and overall relations between Kenya and Uganda.

The countries are both inhabited by significant Swahili-speaking populations, and share significant cultural similarities.

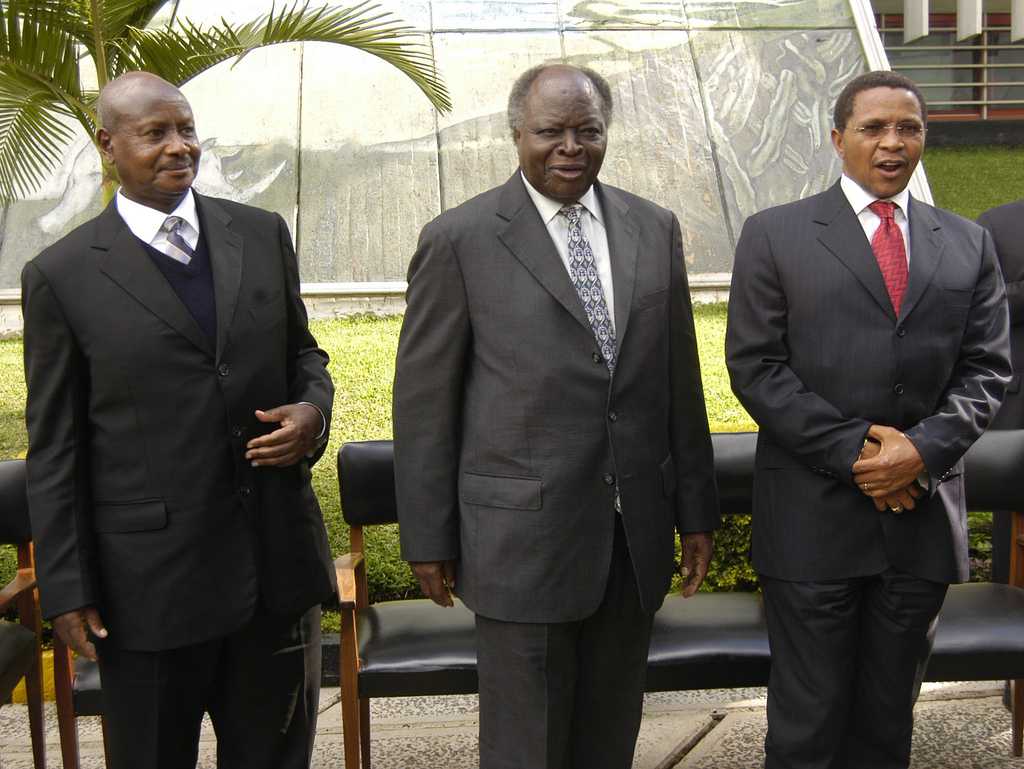
President Yoweri Museveni (Uganda) left, President Mwai Kibaki (Kenya) center, and President Jakaya Kikwete (Tanzania) right during the 8th EAC summit in Arusha

== Trade and economy ==
For many years Uganda was the largest export destination for Kenyan goods. However, in 2014, Tanzania was the major export destination.

In 2013, Kenya exported goods worth KES. 67 billion (EUR. 632 million) to Uganda. This made Uganda the 2nd largest export destination for Kenyan goods after the European Union.

Uganda exported goods worth KES. 15 billion (EUR. 144 million) to Kenya. Bilateral trade was worth KES. 82.3 billion (EUR. 776 million) making Uganda Kenya's 7th largest trade partner.

=== Foreign direct investment ===
Kenyan firms have operations in Uganda, some of which are Kenya Commercial Bank, Equity Bank, and Nakumatt.

=== Infrastructure ===
Both countries are building a standard gauge railway link that would go through Mombasa-Nairobi-Kampala-Kigali. Work began on the Kenyan section of the rail line in December 2014.

There have been proposals to have the Mombasa-Nairobi-Kampala-Kigali route expanded to a motorway all the way. Uganda largely uses the port of Mombasa to get access to international markets. The standard gauge rail link will boost efficiency in delivering goods to the landlocked country from Kenya.

Kenya hoped Uganda would be included in the LAPSSET project in which a pipeline would link the Kenyan and Ugandan oilfields to the a new port city in Lamu, Kenya. To the extent in 2014, Toyota subsidiary Toyota Tsusho got the contract to design the pipeline. On completion, this would have been the world's longest heated pipeline, covering a distance of 1380 km.

== Resident diplomatic missions ==
- Kenya has a high commission in Kampala.
- Uganda has a high commission in Nairobi and a consulate in Mombasa.

== See also ==
- East African Community (EAC)
- African Free Trade Zone
- Migingo Island
