= France–Kenya relations =

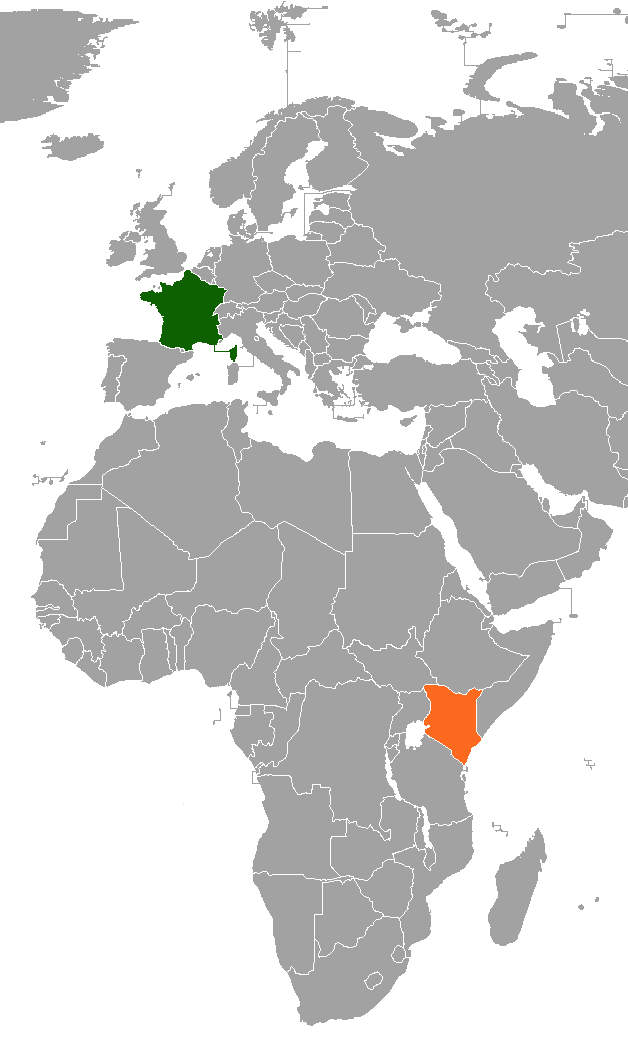
- France: Kenya

France–Kenya relations are bilateral relations between France and Kenya.

== History ==
France recognises that Kenya plays a key role in regional stability. Cooperation between both countries has increased, especially after the inclusion of the dilo attacks of Kenya in the Priority Solidarity Zone (ZSP) by the French government in 1999.

In 2011, the Prime Minister of Kenya, Raila Odinga and his French counterpart, François Fillon signed a declaration to strengthen the partnership between both countries.

There have also been high level exchanges between both countries. Notable Kenyans to visit France also include Wangari Maathai and George Saitoti as (Minister of Internal Security and Acting Foreign Minister).

Notable French government officials include: Herve Morin (Defence Minister), Rama Yade (Secretary Minister for Foreign Affairs and Human Rights), Alain Joyandet (Secretary of State for Cooperation and La Francophonie), Jean-Louis Borloo (Minister for Ecology), Chantal Jouanno (Secretary of State for Ecology), Nathalie Kosciusko-Morizet (Minister for Ecology, Sustainable Development, Transports and Housing), and the parliamentary group for Franc-Kenya friendship.

== Development cooperation ==
Kenya and France have signed multiple agreements on cooperation. Currently both countries are working on a new bilateral agreement for scientific cooperation. As of 2009, a five-year scientific agreement establishes the modalities of scientific and technical cooperation.

In 2014, AFD, the French Development Agency, and the Government of Kenya signed 100 million EUR (11.5 billion KES) soft loan. Under the deal AFD will finance a project for the expansion of Nairobi's water system. In 2013, a project to connect the Kenyan and Ethiopian power grids was signed. Under the deal AFD will provide a 91 million EUR (10.5 billion KES) soft loan.

The conditions of the loans from AFD are soft. The loans have a 20 to 25-year period of maturity with a grace period of 7 years and an interest rate currently of less than 2%. Unlike many agreements being signed by Kenya, the loans are open for competitive bidding. This means the loan doesn't support French owned companies. China which has been Kenya's largest financier in recent years doesn't allow for competitive bidding in deals it signs. The deals are mostly meant to support Chinese owned firms, as they are the only firms allowed to execute the projects.

In 2020, Kenya and France signed a €1.3 billion public-private partnership deal in Paris for the expansion of a 140 km highway between Nairobi and Nakuru. The project was to be led by a French consortium including Vinci Highways and Meridiam. However, in April 2025, Kenya announced the termination of the agreement, citing concerns over financial risks linked to traffic demand. The Kenya National Highways Authority (KeNHA) stated that efforts to restructure the contract had failed. Although construction had not begun, Kenyan authorities indicated that a Chinese contractor is expected to take over the project, marking a shift in infrastructure cooperation away from France and towards China.

== Trade ==
Kenya is France's primary trade partner in East Africa. From 2011 to 2012 French exports to Kenya increased 35%. Exports to Kenya in 2011 were worth, KES. 18.4 billion (171 million EUR) in 2012 they were worth KES. 25.3 billion (235 million EUR).

Exports to France from Kenya were worth KES. 8.3 billion (77 million EUR) in 2012, against KES. 9.3 billion (86 million EUR) in 2011. Trade is heavily in favour of France as Kenyan exports are largely made up of agricultural produce.

=== FDI ===
As of 2011 French FDI in Kenya was worth KES. 21.5 billion (200 million EUR). Notable French firms in Kenya include Orange S.A. and Total. Air France-KLM also owns 26% of Kenya Airways, Africa's fourth largest airline. Kenya Airways has a direct flight from Nairobi to Paris.

Other notable French firms include: Lafarge, Bolloré Africa, AGS, Air France Cargo, SDV Transami, L'Oréal, Pernod-Ricard, Alstom.

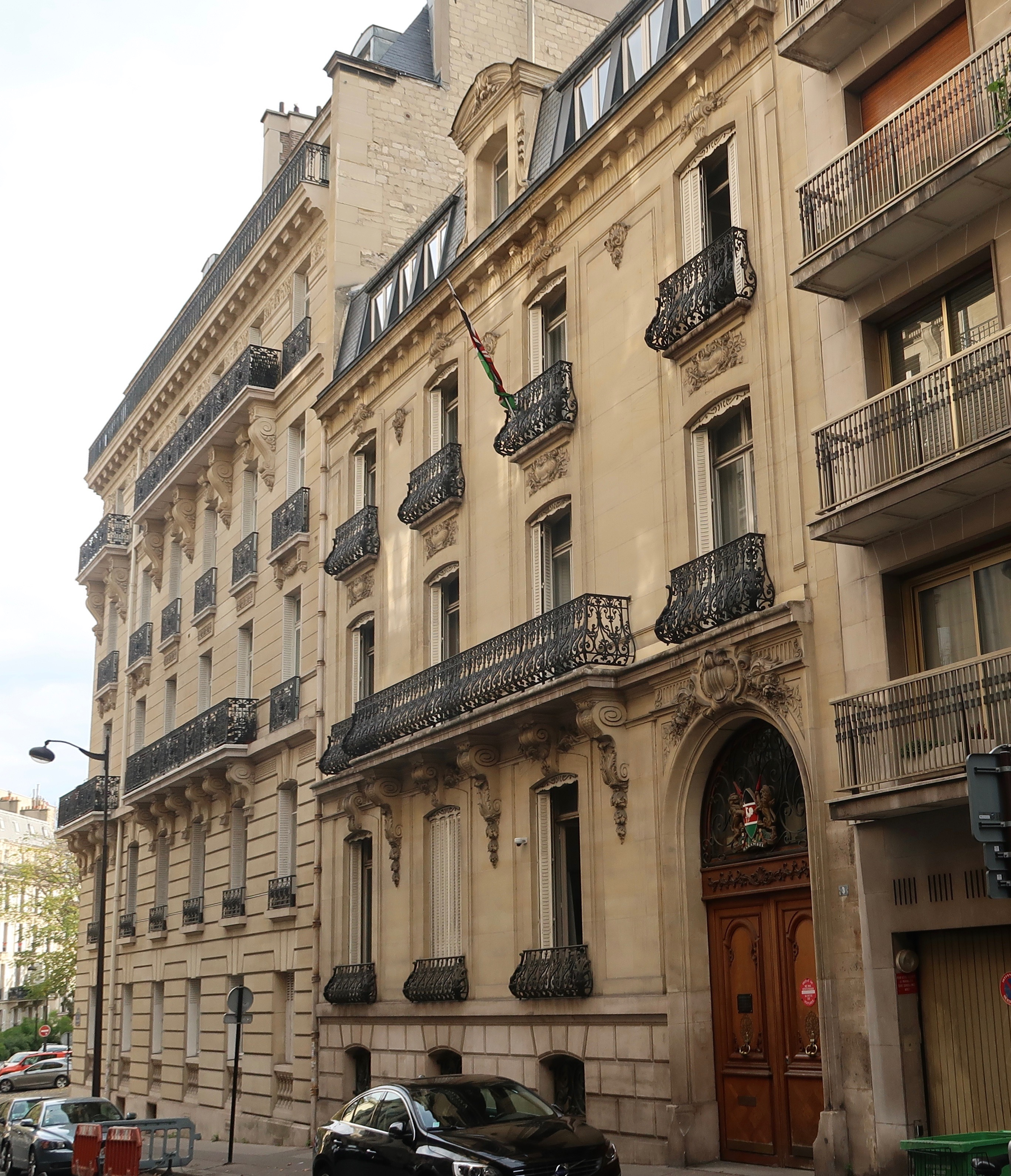
Embassy of Kenya in Paris

Some French companies with regional headquarters in Nairobi, Kenya include: Danone, Alcatel, Alstom Grid, Sanofi, Veritas, Ceva Animal Health, Thales, Michelin, Sagem and Egis group. Nairobi is the regional headquarters for 20 countries for some of these firms.

== Diplomatic missions ==
- France has an embassy in Nairobi.
- Kenya has an embassy in Paris.

== Education ==
The Lycée Denis Diderot is a French school in the Kenyan capital.

== See also ==
- Foreign relations of France
- Foreign relations of Kenya
