= Kenya–Portugal relations =

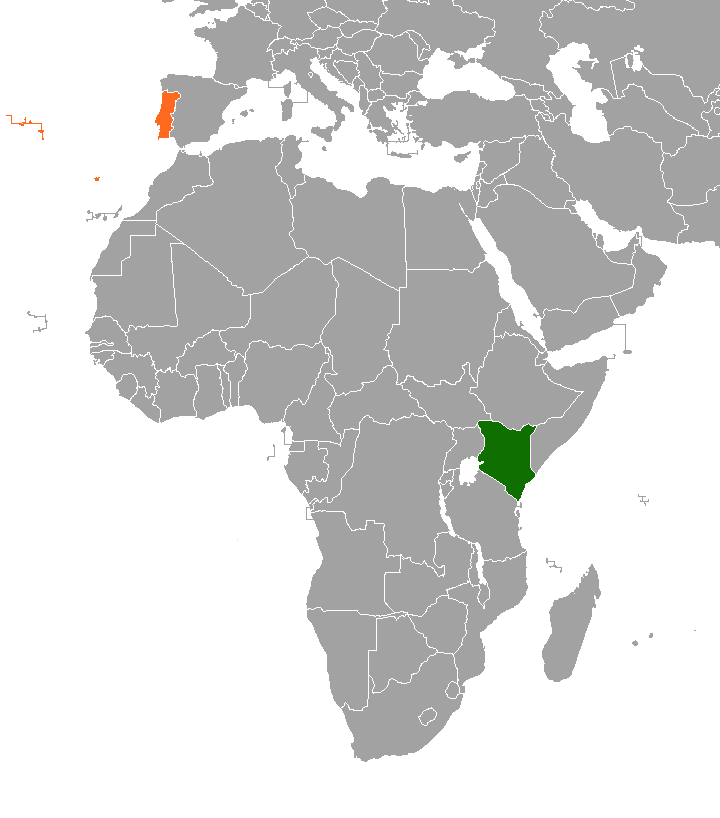
- Kenya: Portugal

Kenya–Portugal relations are bilateral relations between Kenya and Portugal. Both nations have had relations dating back 500 years since the Age of Discovery.

== History ==
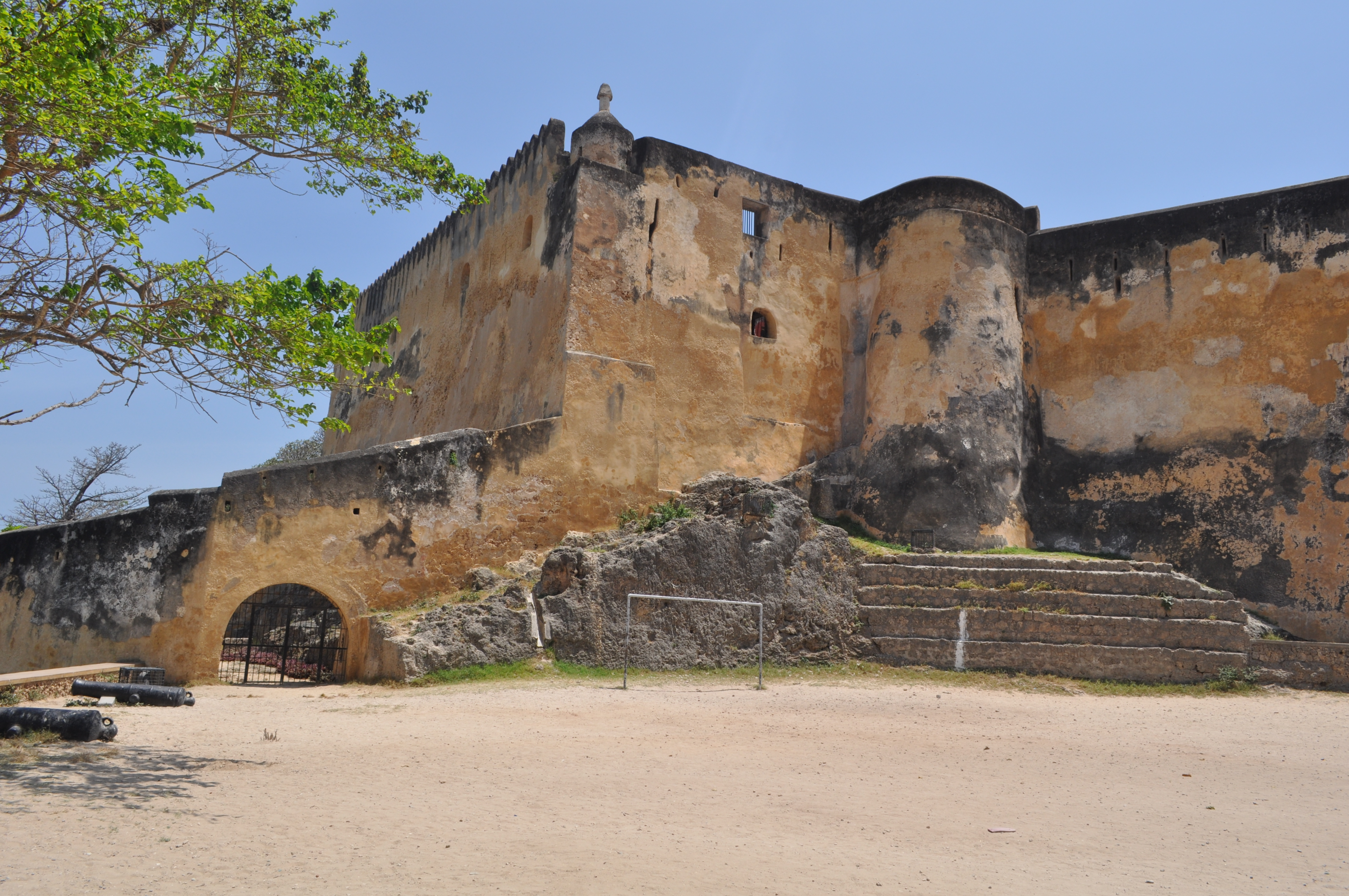
Fort Jesus in Mombasa

In 1497, Portuguese explorer Vasco da Gama, who under the orders of the King of Portugal began sailing to look for a route to India. In 1498, da Gama landed in Mombasa and Malindi both now in present-day Kenya. The Vasco da Gama pillar was constructed in 1498.

Fort Jesus was built in Mombasa by the Portuguese between 1593 and 1596. Between the years of 1631-1895 it changed hands nine times and was fought over by the Portuguese Empire, Imamate of Oman and the British Empire.

Kenya and Portugal established diplomatic relations on 10 January 1977. In 1982, Portugal opened an embassy in Nairobi, however, the embassy was closed and accreditation transferred to the Portuguese embassy in Addis Ababa, Ethiopia. In 2019, Portugal re-opened its embassy in Nairobi.

== Trade ==
In 2020 Portugal exported goods worth US$16.5 million to Kenya, in which papermaking machines, uncoated paper, and synthetic filaments stand out. And Kenya exported goods worth $5.31 million to Portugal, the majority being agricultural goods such as fruits, dried fruits, vegetable oils, but also fish.

== Diplomatic missions ==
- Kenya is accredited to Portugal from its embassy in Paris, France.
- Portugal has an embassy in Nairobi.

== See also ==
- Foreign relations of Kenya
- Foreign relations of Portugal
