= Arab-African Initiative =

The Arab-African Initiative is an initiative founded to implement the Millennium Development Goals in Africa and in the Arab World.

== Establishment ==
Conceived during a series of meetings in 2006 between Dr. Hamdi Saleh, Ambassador of Egypt to Mozambique and Swaziland from 2004 to 2007, Dr. Jeffery Sachs, Special Advisor to the Secretary General of the UN, and Tokyo Sexwale, currently Minister of Human Settlements for the South African Government. The Arab African Initiative was inaugurated on September 17, 2006, in New York. in a meeting chaired by the President of the General Assembly Sheikha Haya Al Rashed Al Khalifa and with the approval of the former Secretary General Kofi Annan.

Its objective is to implement the Millennium Development Goals in Africa and in the Arab World. It seeks to bridge the existing gaps between financing institutions, developmental authorities, and business community, in order to mobilize resources, expertise and capabilities for capacity building in Africa and the Arab World.

The organization has offices in Cairo, Egypt, and Johannesburg, South Africa.

== Conferences and Programs ==
The organization participated in the 2006 debate at the UN Headquarters in New York "Partnerships towards achieving the Millennium Development Goals: Taking stock, moving forward" that was organized by H.E. Sheikha Haya Rashed Al-Khalifa, President of the United Nations General Assembly. The debate recognized the critical need for partnerships in the implementation of the Millennium Development Goals.

In 2007 the Arab-African Initiative held a conference in Cairo to decide a plan of action to ensure the implementation of the Millennium Development Goals in Africa. The conference was under the sponsorship of Mrs. Susan Mubarak and was attended by a range of political leaders, such as Queen Ntombi of Swaziland, and several leaders of charity groups and business from the Persian Gulf region. Also represented at the conference were several leaders of charity groups and business groups from the Persian Gulf, Islamic banks, including the Dubai Islamic Bank and the Noor Islamic Bank, and Arab funding institutions such as the Islamic Development Bank and the Kuwait Fund for Arab Economic Development. Featured was a televised speech by Dr. Jeffery Sacks, a speech by Tokyo Sexwale, and a presentation from Princess Haya Al Hussein of Dubai.

The 2008 Arab-African Initiative Sports for Peace and Development Program was based on the idea that sport can serve as an effective mechanism to unite persons of different backgrounds and nationalities, and also develop essential life skills in young people. Especially important in post-conflict areas where the provision of sporting equipment is often an effective way to restore normal life. The conference received messages from Wilfriend Lemke, Special Adviser to the Sectary General of the United Nations Sports for Development and Peace, FIFA representatives, and Sheikh Mohammad Saqr Al-Qassimi, Chairman of the UAE Sports Committee.

In 2009 the organization held a conference called "Partnership for Development: The Arab Word and Africa". The 2-day workshop, held in Dubai, dealt with how to strengthen partnerships and economic cooperation between the Arab and African regions. H.R.H. Queen Matsebula of Swaziland, as well as Ministers of Angola, Mozambique, and South Africa attended the conference. The guest of honor was H.E. Dr. Anwar M. Gargash, Minister of State of Foreign Affairs for the United Arab Emirates.

In 2010 the organization participated, in conjunction with The Middle East Center for International Cooperation and George Mason University, in the Washington D.C.–based conference "Building Bridges: U.S. – Islamic Partnerships and Social Change". This was convened as a follow-up to President Obama's Summit on Entrepreneurship, with a view to broaden President Obama’s efforts within civil society. The conference featured contributions from a number of political, educational, and business leaders. Including Senator Birch Bayh II, former U.S. Senator for Indiana, and Amir Dossal, Executive Director of the United Nations Office for Partnerships.

Arab-African Initiative
