= Kenya–Russia relations =

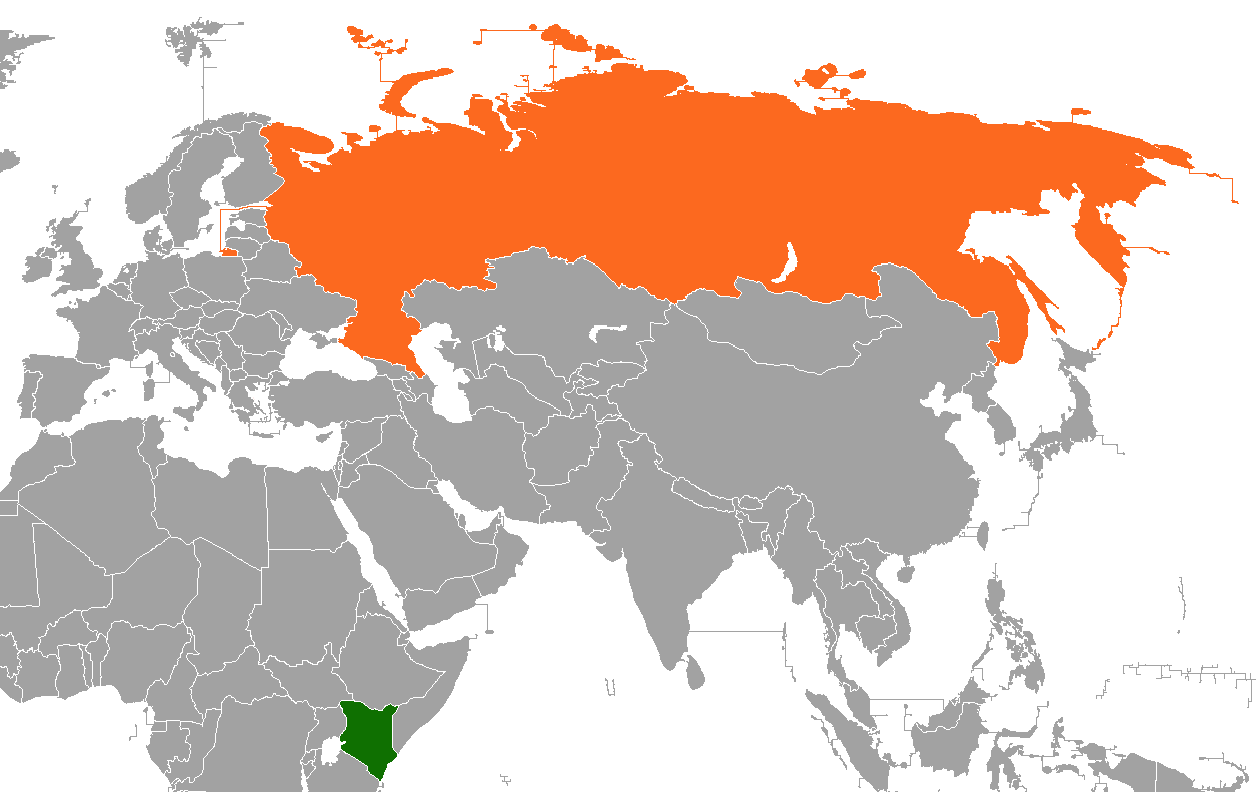
- Kenya: Russia

Kenya–Russia relations (Swahili: Uhusiano wa Kenya-Urusi) (Russian: Российско-кенийские отношения) are bilateral relations between Kenya and Russia. Russia had established diplomatic relations with Kenya on December 14, 1963, and has since maintained good relations with the African Great Lakes country.

== Overview ==
During the Cold War, Kenya was part of the Non-aligned movement and thus maintained good relations with the Soviet Union. The Soviet Union even offered Kenyans scholarships to study in the country.

== Visits ==
In October 2019, President Uhuru Kenyatta made a visit to Russia and attended the Russia Africa Summit in Sochi. Kenya and Russia agreed to form a business council which would oversee joint trade and investment programmes.

In November 2010, Russian Foreign Minister Sergey Lavrov visited Nairobi. He had a conversation with the President of Kenya Mwai Kibaki and talks with Acting Foreign Minister George Saitoti. Lavrov was the first Russian Foreign Affairs minister to visit Kenya.

== Trade ==
Bilateral trade reached a total of Kes.35.22 billion (US$340 million).

Kenya exported goods worth Kes.12.85 billion (US$124 million) and Russia exported goods worth Kes.22.37 billion (US$216 million) to Kenya in 2018, according to the Russian Export Centre.

The main goods Russia exports to Kenya are cereals, iron and steel, fertilizers and paper. Kenya mainly exports cut flowers, coffee, tea, fruits and vegetables to Russia.

== Development cooperation ==
Kenya is annually visited by about 10,000 Russian tourists. To strengthen Russian-Kenyan cooperation agreement in the field of tourism Najib Balala, Kenyan Tourism Minister, visited Moscow in March 2011 to participate in the International Tourism Exhibition.

=== Transport ===
In November 2009, the Kenyan delegation led by the Minister of Transport Chirau Ali Mwakwere participated in the First Global Ministerial Conference on Road Safety in Moscow.

In 2010 JSC "Aeroflot - Russian Airlines" and "Kenya Airways' commercial agreement on joint operation of the route Moscow - Dubai - Nairobi, and Aeroflot was scheduled to perform passenger and cargo transportation on the route Moscow - Nairobi - Moscow.

=== Education ===
As of 2008, the Russian government and private companies have trained approximately 200 people. In addition, Russia annually grants Kenya 30 scholarships from the federal budget. The number dropped to 26 in 2010, because of organisational difficulties with the Kenyan side.

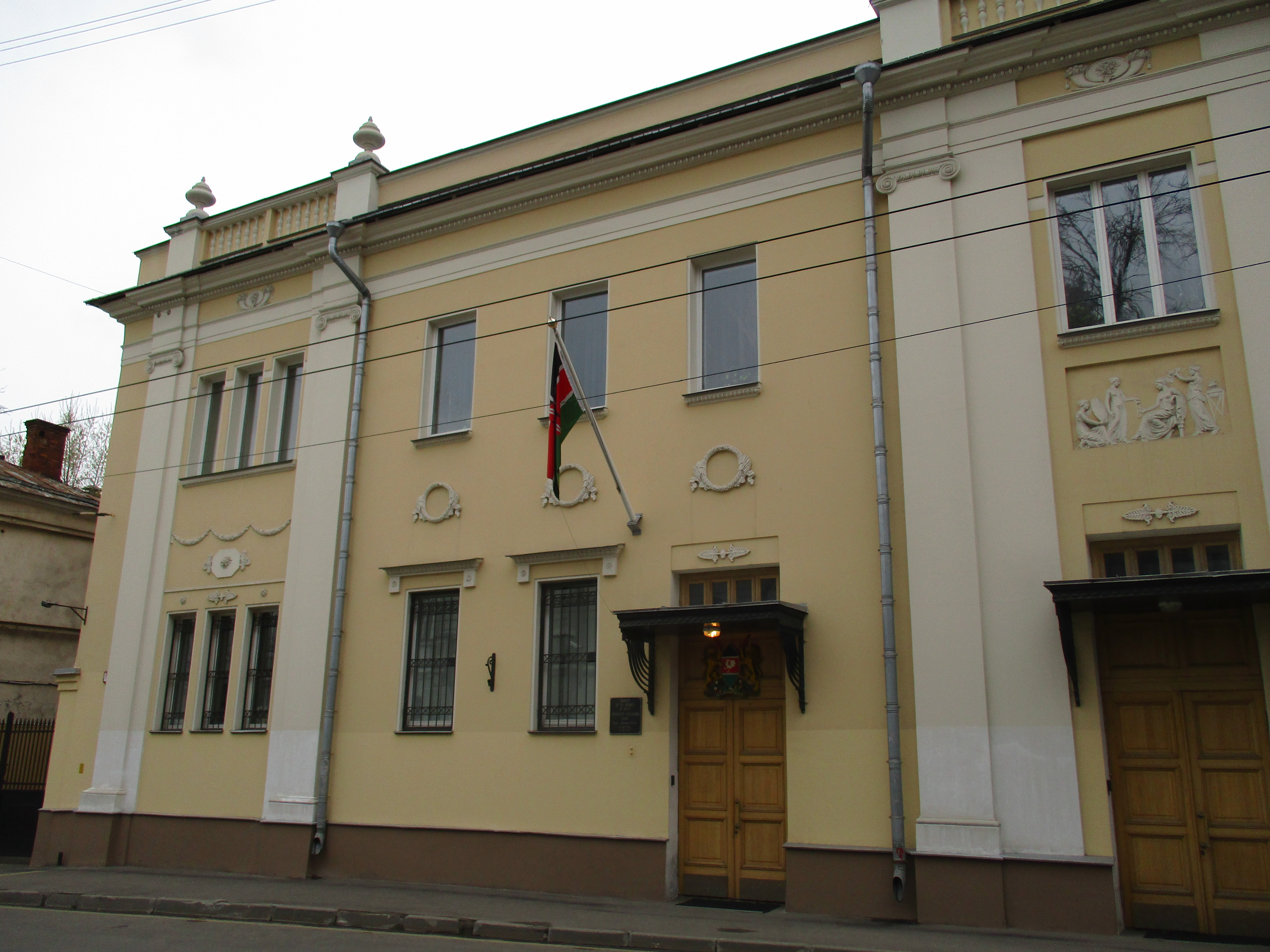
Embassy of Kenya in Moscow

== Diplomatic missions ==
- Kenya has an embassy in Moscow.
- Russia has an embassy in Nairobi.

== Illegal recruitment of Kenyans to fight in the Ukraine war ==
Following the 2022 Russian invasion of Ukraine, Russia has been accused of tricking and coercing Kenyans into fighting for its Ground Forces, most of the victims are enticed with fake promises of well paying jobs. National Assembly Majority Leader Kimani Ichung'wah said staff at the Russian Embassy in Kenya and Kenyan Embassy in Russia were cooperating with recruitment agencies to traffic Kenyans that eventually fought on Russia's side. According to the Kenyan government, roughly 200 people have fought for the Russian Ground Forces during the war. Foreign Minister Musalia Mudavadi in 2026 called the recruitment "unacceptable and clandestine" and said illegal recruiters had been shut down. However, a 2026 intelligence report presented to the Parliament of Kenya stated a much higher figure: at least 1,000 Kenyans had been tricked into fighting for Russia.

The Russian embassy in Kenya denied claims that its officials were working to illegally recruit and traffic Kenyans who were then coerced or forced to fight for its ground forces.

According to Mudavadi speaking to the Senate of Kenya on 7 May 2026, 19 Kenyans had been killed, 32 had gone missing and two had taken as prisoners of war fighting for Russia.

== See also ==
- Foreign relations of Kenya
- Foreign relations of Russia
- List of ambassadors of Russia to Kenya
