= Tabu Osusa =

Kenyan music producer

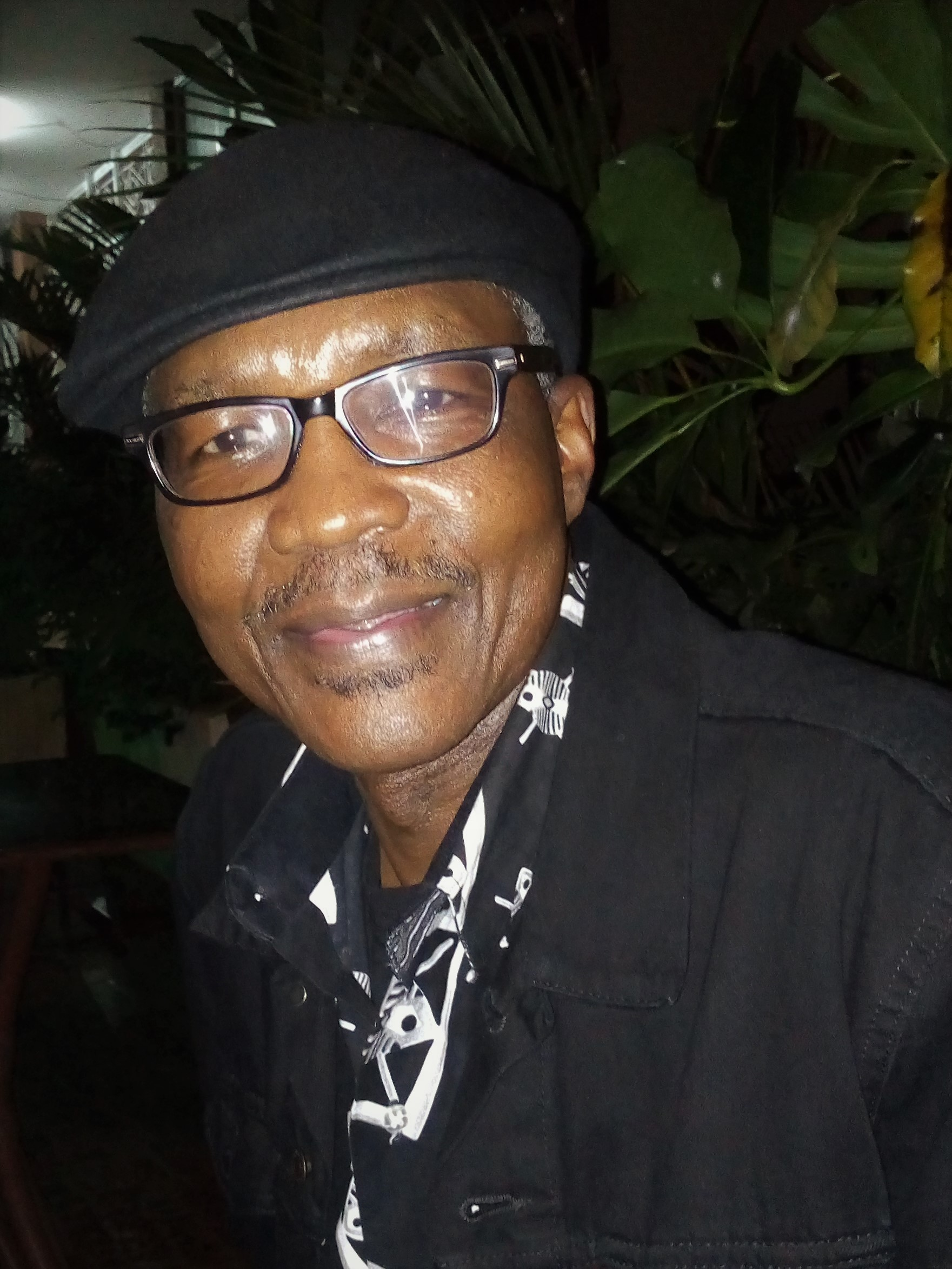
- Tabu Osusa in Nairobi, April 2018

Background information
- Born: Tabu Osusa; 21 July 1954 (age 72); Mirogi, Nyanza Province, Kenya
- Genres: Funk, Benga music, African Music
- Occupation: Record producer
- Years active: 1974–present
- Label: Ketebul Music
- Website: www.ketebulmusic.org

Tabu Osusa (born 21 July 1954) is a Kenyan author and music producer, and the founder of Ketebul Music.

== Career ==
In 1974 Osusa decided to travel the DRC then Zaire, settling in Barumbu Kinshasa where he was first introduced to music by the Kenyan saxophonist Ben Nicholas. Osusa returned to Kenya in 1977 and briefly joined the band Les Kinois. Since then, Osusa has been a composer, recording artist, songwriter, promoter, band manager and producer.

In 2007, Tabu Osusa founded Ketebul Music. He is the acting director of the organisation, assisted by some people with varied knowledge and skills in the wider field of arts and culture. The chairman of Ketebul Music is the kenyan cartoonist Maddo.

In 2014, Tabu Osusa with Ketebul Music was appointed by the Smithsonian Folkways to select artists and co-produce the albums African Rhythms: Songs from Kenya

Tabu Osusa was the lead author of Shades of Benga: The Story of Popular Music In Kenya 1946-2016. The book published in August 2017 traces the origins of Kenya's popular music to the end of the Second World War to date.

In 2016 he was nominated Five Music Rights Champion by the International Music Council
