= 28th IGAD Extra ordinary summit =

28th IGAD Extra ordinary summit The 28th Extra-ordinary session of the IGAD assembly of Heads of State and Government on Somalia
- Host country: Somalia
- Date: 13 September 2016
- Cities: Mogadishu
- Participants: Djibouti; Ethiopia; Kenya; Somalia; South Sudan; Sudan; Uganda
- Follows: 27th IGAD Extra ordinary summit
- Precedes: 29th IGAD Extra ordinary summit

The 28th Intergovernmental Authority on Development Extra ordinary summit was held on 13 September 2016 in Mogadishu, Somalia. This was a historic event for Somalia as it has not hosted a high level summit in over 30 years. The key focus of the meeting was to determine the security situation in Somalia with respect to its scheduled parliamentary election. The lower-house election of Somalia is scheduled to take place on 30 October 2016.

== Participants ==
Member	Representative	Title
Djibouti	Mahamoud Ali Youssouf	Minister for Foreign Affairs
Ethiopia	Hailemariam Desalegn	Prime Minister; Chairperson of the IGAD
Kenya	Uhuru Kenyatta	President
Somalia	Hassan Sheikh Mohamud	President of Somalia
Sudan	Mohamed Yousif Abdelmannan	Ambassador to Somalia
Uganda	Yoweri Museveni	President

The Summit was also attended by representatives of other foreign trade blocs. Representatives from the United Nations, African Union, Arab League and European Union graced their presence.
