= List of diplomatic missions of Egypt =

This is a list of diplomatic missions of Egypt. Egypt has an extensive global diplomatic presence.

Excluded from this listing are honorary consulates and trade missions.

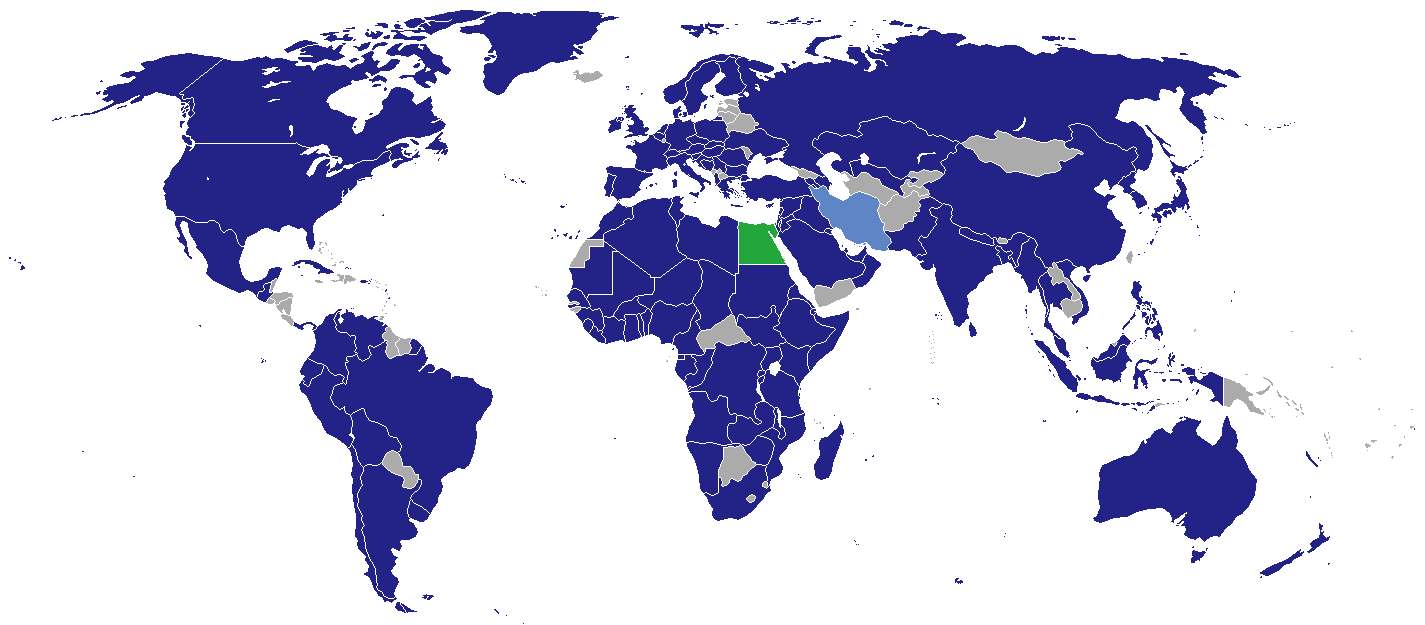
Diplomatic missions of Egypt Arab Republic of Egypt Countries with an Egyptian Embassy Countries with an Egyptian Interest Section

== Current missions ==
=== Africa ===
Host country	Host city	Mission	Concurrent accreditation	Ref.
Algeria	Algiers	Embassy		
Angola	Luanda	Embassy	Countries: São Tomé and Príncipe	
Benin	Cotonou	Embassy		
Burkina Faso	Ouagadougou	Embassy		
Burundi	Bujumbura	Embassy		
Cameroon	Yaoundé	Embassy	Countries: Central African Republic	
Chad	N'Djamena	Embassy		
Congo-Brazzaville	Brazzaville	Embassy		
Congo-Kinshasa	Kinshasa	Embassy		
Djibouti	Djibouti City	Embassy		
Equatorial Guinea	Malabo	Embassy		
Eritrea	Asmara	Embassy		
Ethiopia	Addis Ababa	Embassy	International Organizations: African Union	
Gabon	Libreville	Embassy		
Ghana	Accra	Embassy		
Guinea	Conakry	Embassy	Countries: Guinea-Bissau	
Ivory Coast	Abidjan	Embassy		
Kenya	Nairobi	Embassy	Countries: Seychelles; International Organizations: United Nations; United Nations Environment Programme; United Nations Human Settlements Programme	
Liberia	Monrovia	Embassy		
Libya	Tripoli	Embassy		
Libya	Benghazi	Consulate		
Madagascar	Antananarivo	Embassy		
Malawi	Lilongwe	Embassy		
Mali	Bamako	Embassy		
Mauritania	Nouakchott	Embassy		
Mauritius	Port Louis	Embassy		
Morocco	Rabat	Embassy		
Mozambique	Maputo	Embassy	Countries: Eswatini	
Namibia	Windhoek	Embassy		
Niger	Niamey	Embassy		
Nigeria	Abuja	Embassy		
Rwanda	Kigali	Embassy		
Senegal	Dakar	Embassy	Countries: Cape Verde; Gambia	
Sierra Leone	Freetown	Embassy		
Somalia	Mogadishu	Embassy		
South Africa	Pretoria	Embassy	Countries: Botswana; Lesotho	
South Sudan	Juba	Embassy		
Sudan	Khartoum	Embassy		
Sudan	Port Sudan	Consulate-General		
Sudan	Wadi Halfa	Consulate		
Tanzania	Dar es Salaam	Embassy	Countries: Comoros	
Togo	Lomé	Embassy		
Tunisia	Tunis	Embassy		
Uganda	Kampala	Embassy		
Zambia	Lusaka	Embassy		
Zimbabwe	Harare	Embassy		

=== Americas ===
Host country	Host city	Mission	Concurrent accreditation	Ref.
Argentina	Buenos Aires	Embassy		
Bolivia	La Paz	Embassy		
Brazil	Brasília	Embassy		
Brazil	Rio de Janeiro	Consulate-General		
Canada	Ottawa	Embassy		
Canada	Montreal	Consulate-General		
Chile	Santiago de Chile	Embassy		
Colombia	Bogotá	Embassy		
Cuba	Havana	Embassy	Countries: Bahamas; Barbados; Dominican Republic; Jamaica; Saint Lucia; Saint Vincent and the Grenadines	
Ecuador	Quito	Embassy		
Guatemala	Guatemala City	Embassy	Countries: El Salvador; Honduras	
Mexico	Mexico City	Embassy	Countries: Belize	
Panama	Panama City	Embassy	Countries: Costa Rica; Nicaragua	
Peru	Lima	Embassy		
United States	Washington, D.C.	Embassy	International Organizations: Organization of American States (Note: Accredited as an observer mission.)	
United States	Chicago	Consulate-General	International Organizations: Organization of American States	
United States	Houston	Consulate-General	International Organizations: Organization of American States	
United States	Los Angeles	Consulate-General	International Organizations: Organization of American States	
United States	New York City	Consulate-General	International Organizations: Organization of American States	
Uruguay	Montevideo	Embassy	Countries: Paraguay	
Venezuela	Caracas	Embassy	Countries: Grenada; Trinidad and Tobago	

=== Asia ===
Host country	Host city	Mission	Concurrent accreditation	Ref.
Armenia	Yerevan	Embassy	Countries: Georgia	
Azerbaijan	Baku	Embassy		
Bahrain	Manama	Embassy		
Bangladesh	Dhaka	Embassy		
China	Beijing	Embassy	Countries: Mongolia	
China	Hong Kong	Consulate-General	Countries: Mongolia	
China	Shanghai	Consulate-General	Countries: Mongolia	
India	New Delhi	Embassy	Countries: Bhutan	
India	Mumbai	Consulate-General	Countries: Bhutan	
Indonesia	Jakarta	Embassy	Countries: Timor-Leste; International Organizations: Association of Southeast Asian Nations	
Iran	Tehran	Interests Section		
Iraq	Baghdad	Embassy		
Iraq	Basra	Consulate-General		
Iraq	Erbil	Consulate-General		
Israel	Tel Aviv	Embassy		
Israel	Eilat	Consulate-General		
Japan	Tokyo	Embassy		
Jordan	Amman	Embassy		
Jordan	Aqaba	Consulate		
Kazakhstan	Astana	Embassy	Countries: Kyrgyzstan	
Kuwait	Kuwait City	Embassy		
Lebanon	Beirut	Embassy		
Malaysia	Kuala Lumpur	Embassy	Countries: Brunei	
Myanmar	Yangon	Embassy		
Nepal	Kathmandu	Embassy		
North Korea	Pyongyang	Embassy		
Oman	Muscat	Embassy		
Pakistan	Islamabad	Embassy		
Palestine	Ramallah	Representative Office		
Philippines	Manila	Embassy		
Qatar	Doha	Embassy		
Saudi Arabia	Riyadh	Embassy	Countries: Yemen	
Saudi Arabia	Jeddah	Consulate-General	Countries: Yemen	
Singapore	Singapore	Embassy		
South Korea	Seoul	Embassy		
Sri Lanka	Colombo	Embassy	Countries: Maldives	
Syria	Damascus	Embassy		
Thailand	Bangkok	Embassy	Countries: Cambodia	
Turkey	Ankara	Embassy		
Turkey	Istanbul	Consulate-General		
United Arab Emirates	Abu Dhabi	Embassy		
United Arab Emirates	Dubai	Consulate-General		
Uzbekistan	Tashkent	Embassy		
Vietnam	Hanoi	Embassy	Countries: Laos	

=== Europe ===
Host country	Host city	Mission	Concurrent accreditation	Ref.
Albania	Tirana	Embassy		
Austria	Vienna	Embassy	International Organizations: United Nations	
Belgium	Brussels	Embassy	Countries: Luxembourg; International Organizations: European Union	
Bosnia and Herzegovina	Sarajevo	Embassy		
Bulgaria	Sofia	Embassy	Countries: North Macedonia	
Croatia	Zagreb	Embassy		
Cyprus	Nicosia	Embassy		
Czechia	Prague	Embassy	Countries: Montenegro	
Denmark	Copenhagen	Embassy	Countries: Lithuania	
Finland	Helsinki	Embassy	Countries: Estonia	
France	Paris	Embassy	Countries: Monaco	
France	Marseille	Consulate-General	Countries: Monaco	
Germany	Berlin	Embassy		
Germany	Frankfurt	Consulate-General		
Germany	Hamburg	Consulate-General		
Greece	Athens	Embassy		
Holy See	Rome (Note: The Egyptian Embassy to the Holy See is located outside Vatican territory in Rome.)	Embassy	Sovereign entity: Sovereign Military Order of Malta	
Hungary	Budapest	Embassy		
Ireland	Dublin	Embassy		
Italy	Rome	Embassy	Countries: San Marino; International Organizations: Food and Agriculture Organization; International Fund for Agricultural Development; World Food Programme	
Italy	Milan	Consulate-General	Countries: San Marino; International Organizations: Food and Agriculture Organization; International Fund for Agricultural Development; World Food Programme	
Malta	Valletta (Note: Although officially titled as an embassy in Valletta, its chancery is physically located in the nearby town of Ta' Xbiex.)	Embassy		
Netherlands	The Hague	Embassy		
Norway	Oslo	Embassy	Countries: Iceland	
Poland	Warsaw	Embassy		
Portugal	Lisbon	Embassy		
Romania	Bucharest	Embassy	Countries: Moldova	
Russia	Moscow	Embassy	Countries: Belarus; Tajikistan; Turkmenistan	
Serbia	Belgrade	Embassy		
Slovakia	Bratislava	Embassy		
Slovenia	Ljubljana	Embassy		
Spain	Madrid	Embassy		
Sweden	Stockholm	Embassy	Countries: Latvia	
Switzerland	Bern	Embassy	Countries: Liechtenstein	
Switzerland	Geneva	Consulate-General	Countries: Liechtenstein	
Ukraine	Kyiv	Embassy		
United Kingdom	London	Embassy		
United Kingdom	London	Consulate-General		

=== Oceania ===
Host country	Host city	Mission	Concurrent accreditation	Ref.
Australia	Canberra	Embassy	Countries: Fiji; Marshall Islands; Papua New Guinea; Nauru; Solomon Islands; Vanuatu	
Australia	Melbourne	Consulate-General	Countries: Fiji; Marshall Islands; Papua New Guinea; Nauru; Solomon Islands; Vanuatu	
Australia	Sydney	Consulate-General	Countries: Fiji; Marshall Islands; Papua New Guinea; Nauru; Solomon Islands; Vanuatu	
New Zealand	Wellington	Embassy	Countries: Samoa	

=== Multilateral organizations ===
Organization	Host city	Host country	Mission	Concurrent accreditation	Ref.
United Nations	New York City	United States	Permanent Mission		
United Nations	Geneva	Switzerland	Permanent Mission		
UNESCO	Paris	France	Permanent Delegation		

== Gallery ==
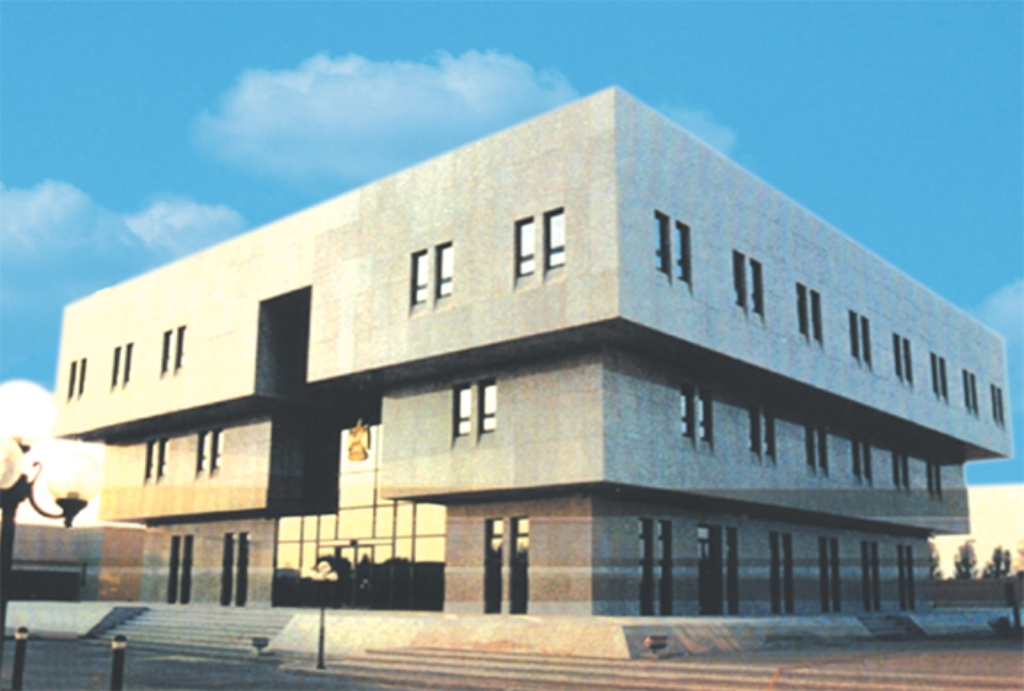
Embassy in Abu Dhabi

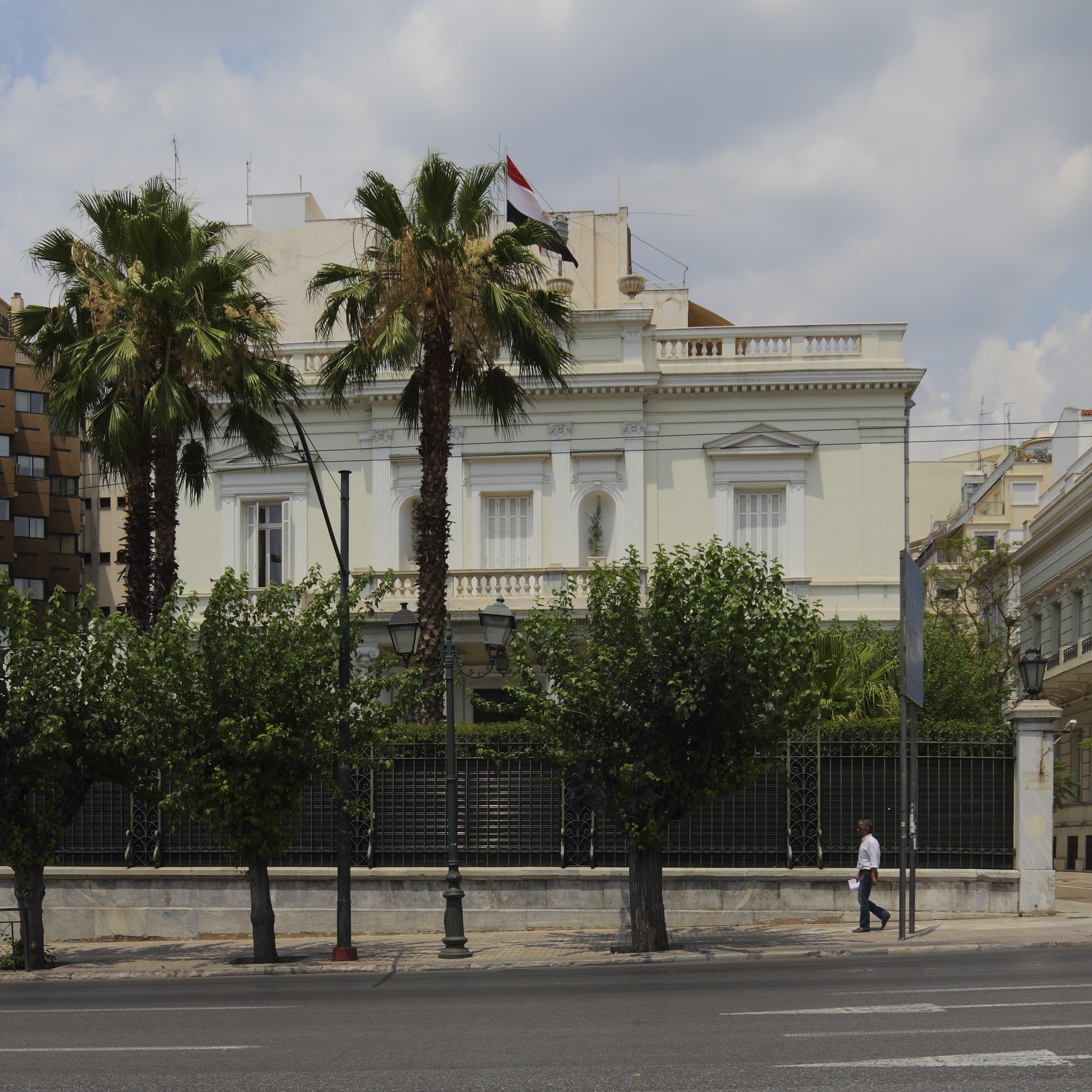
Embassy in Athens

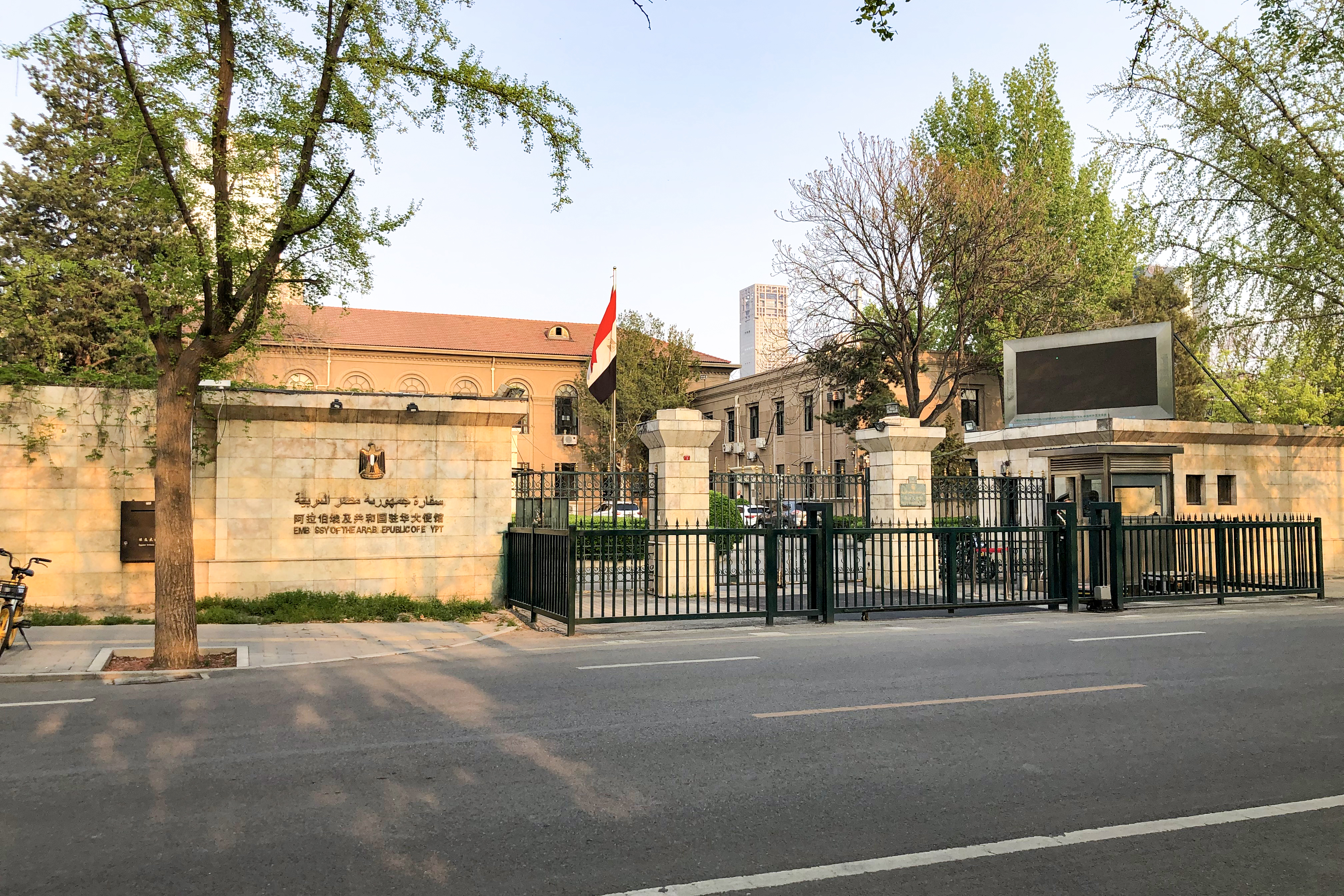
Embassy in Beijing

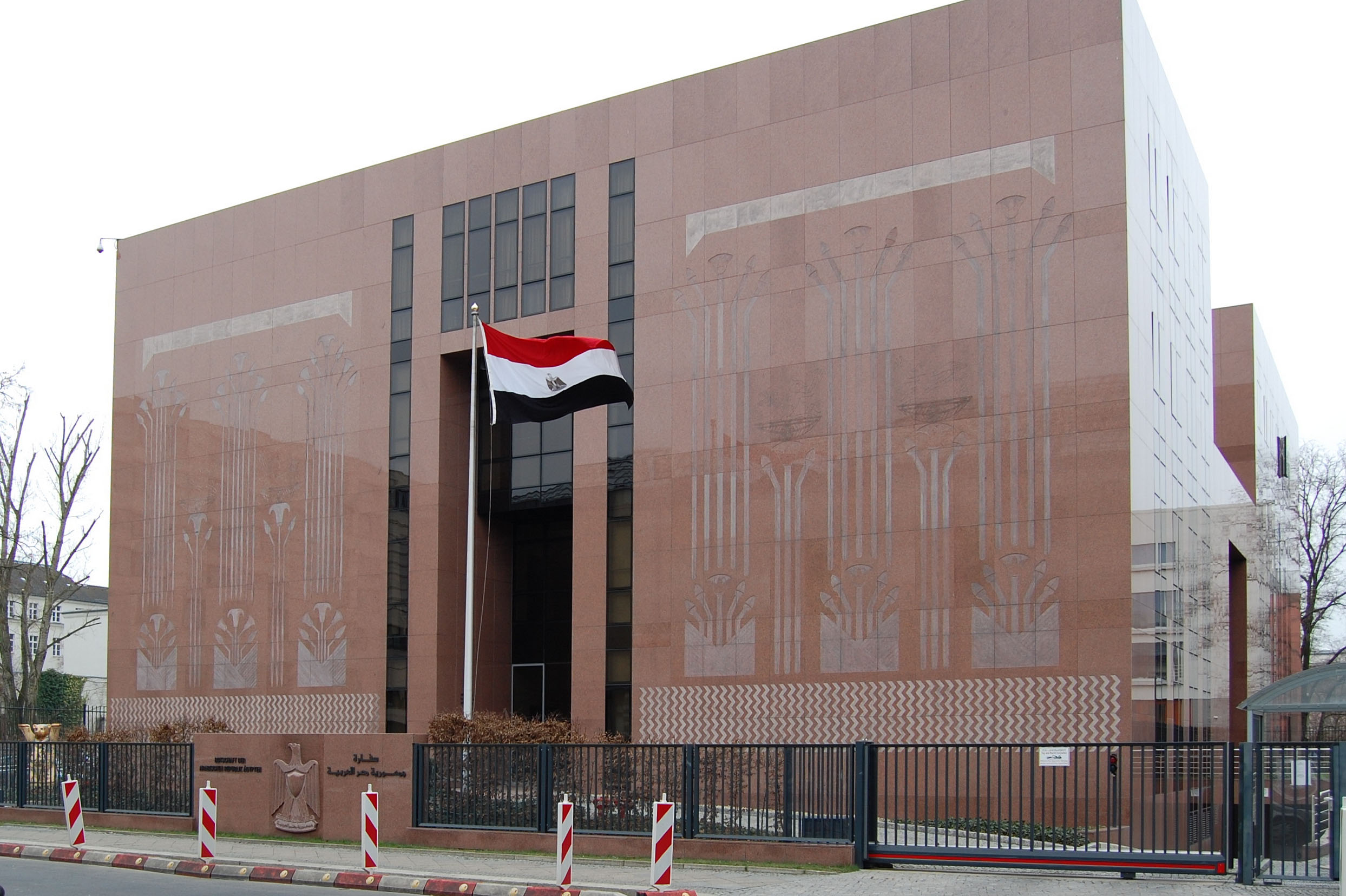
Embassy in Berlin

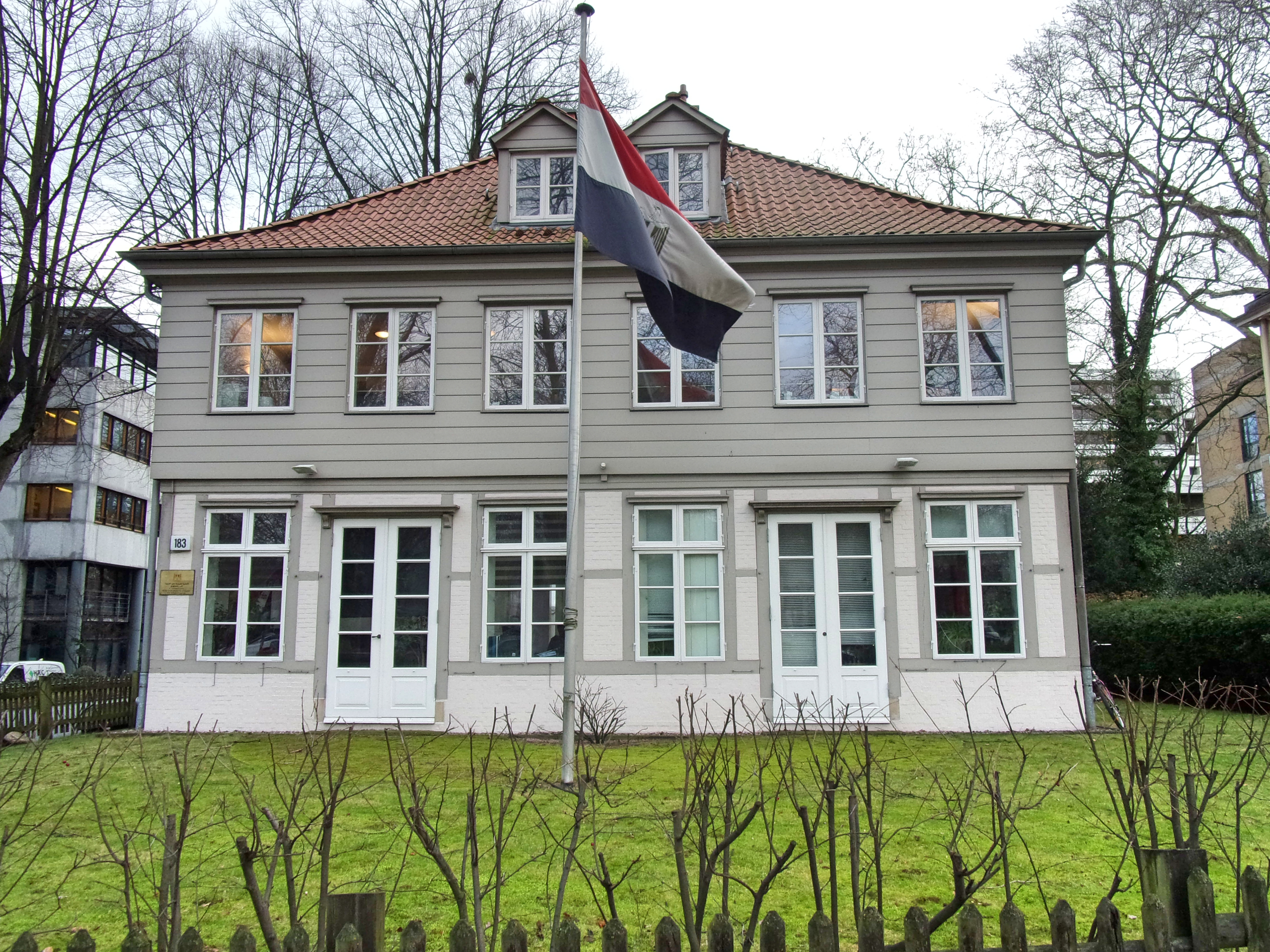
Consulate-General in Hamburg

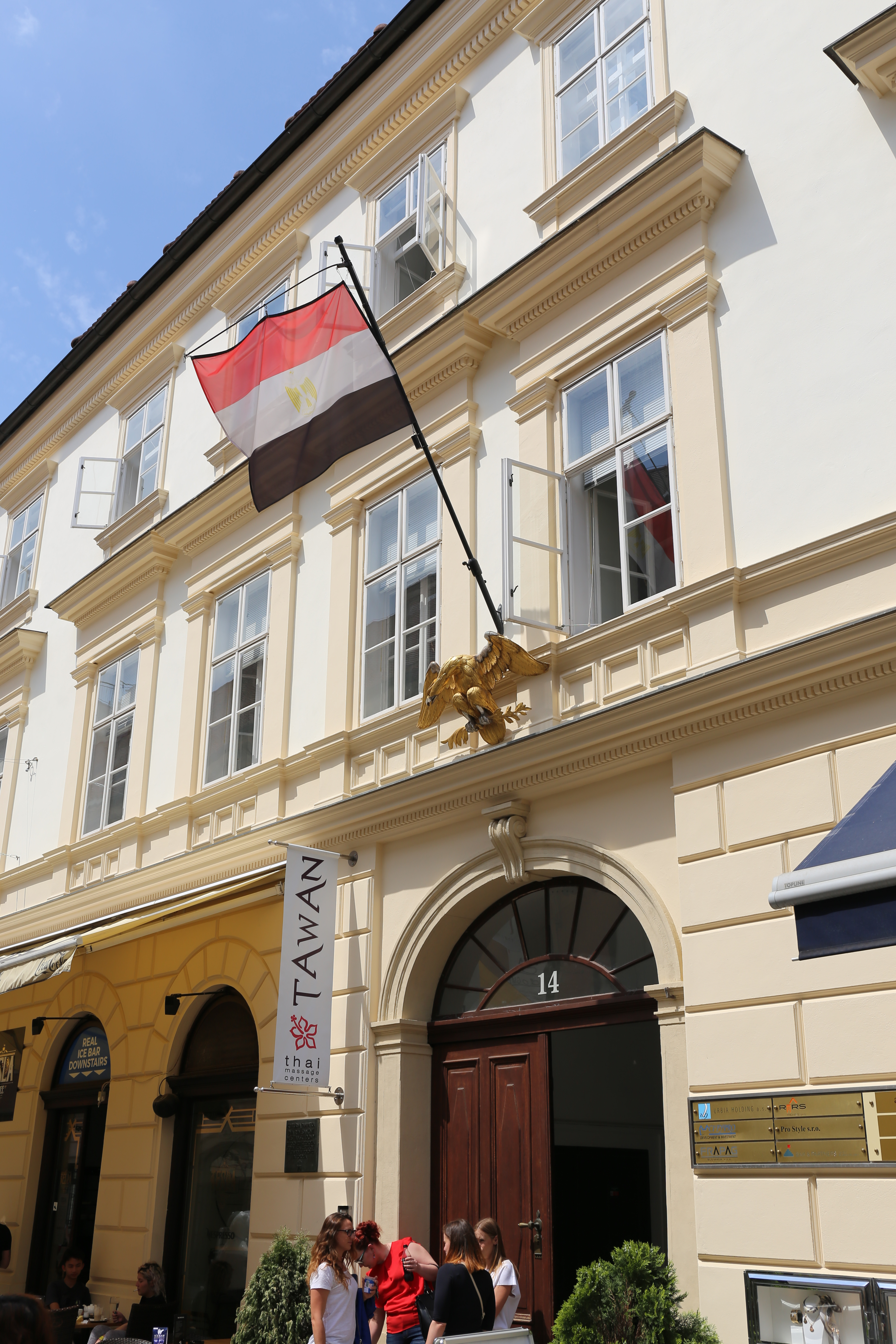
Embassy in Bratislava

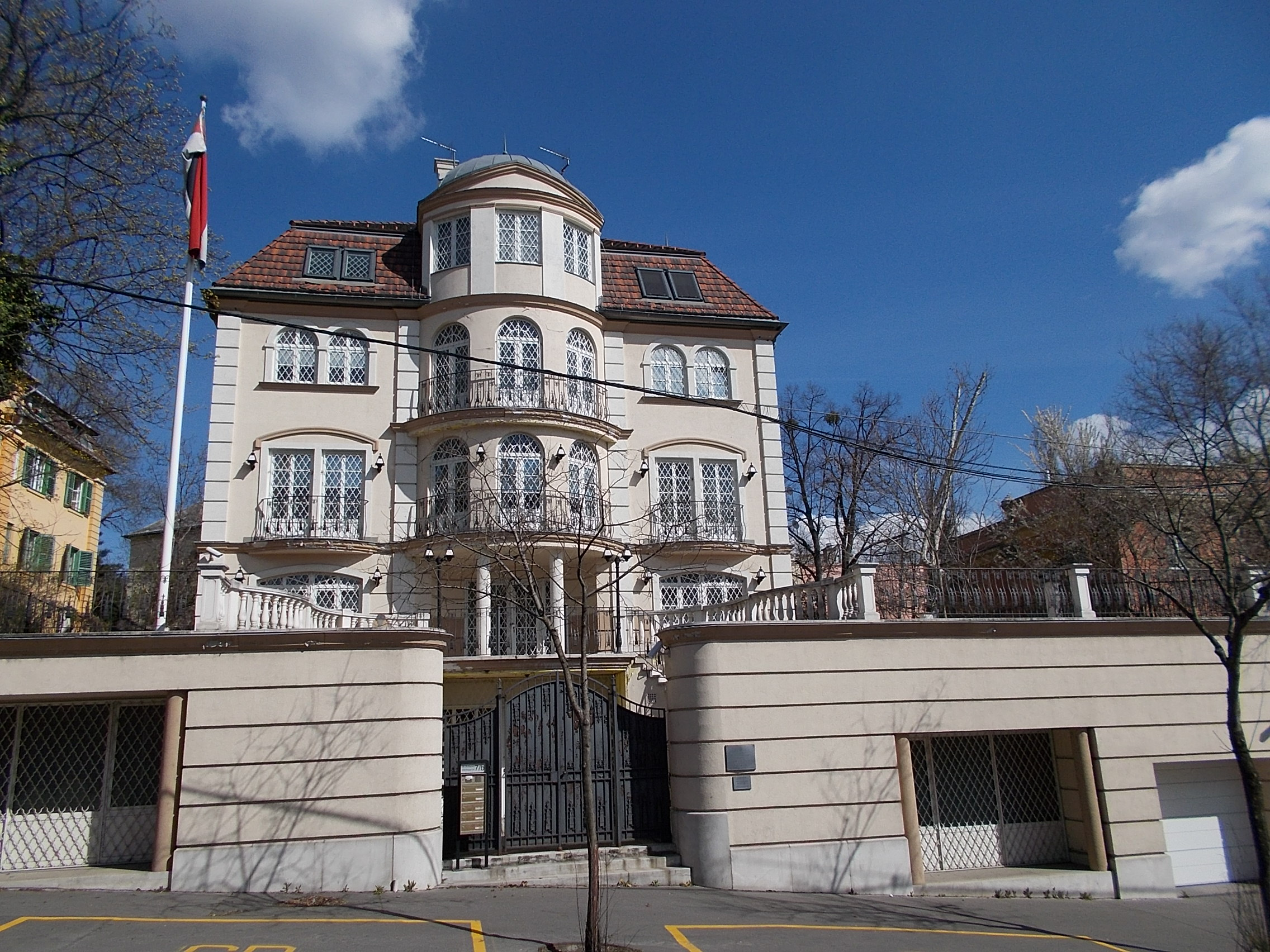
Embassy in Budapest

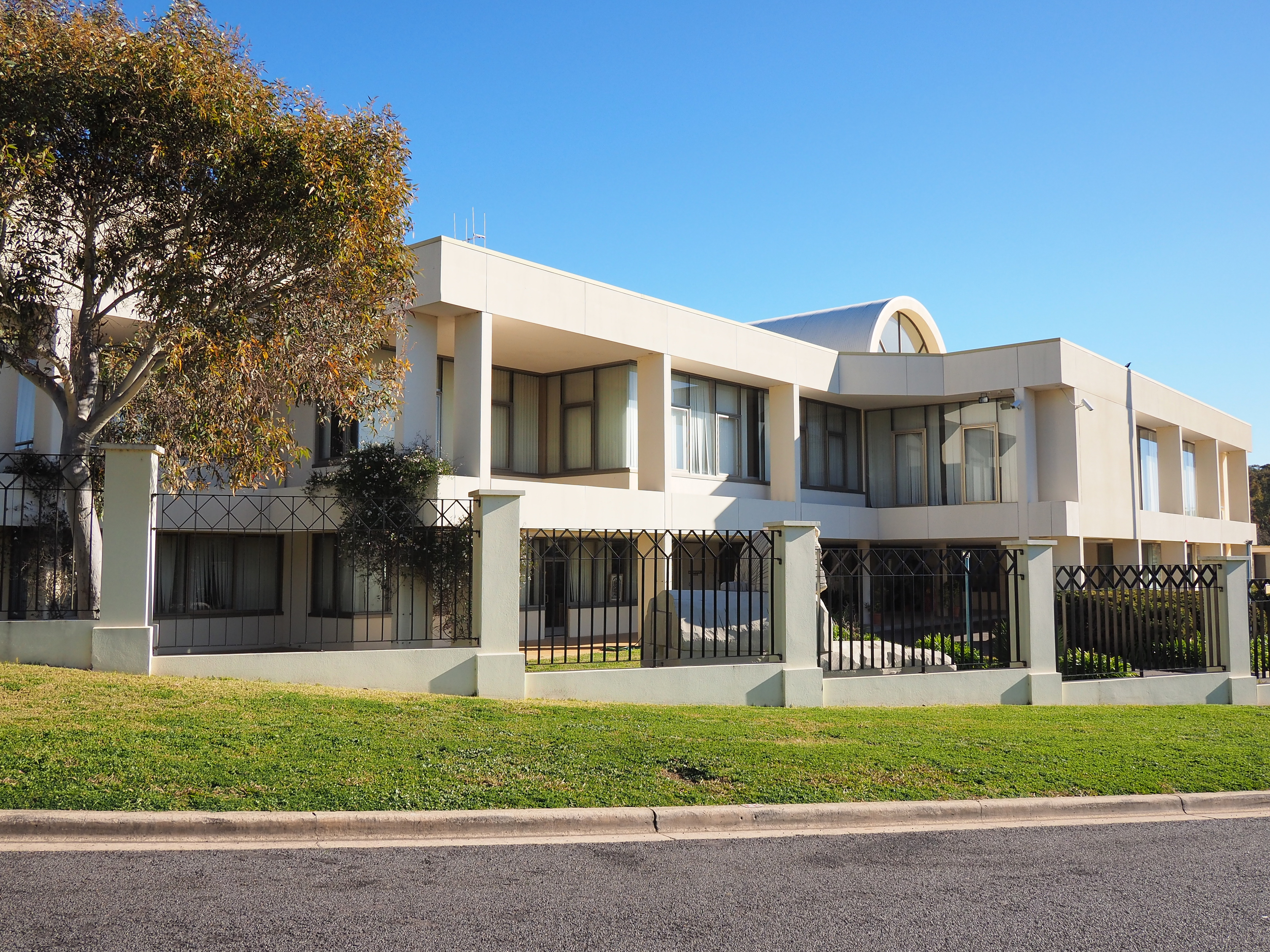
Embassy in Canberra

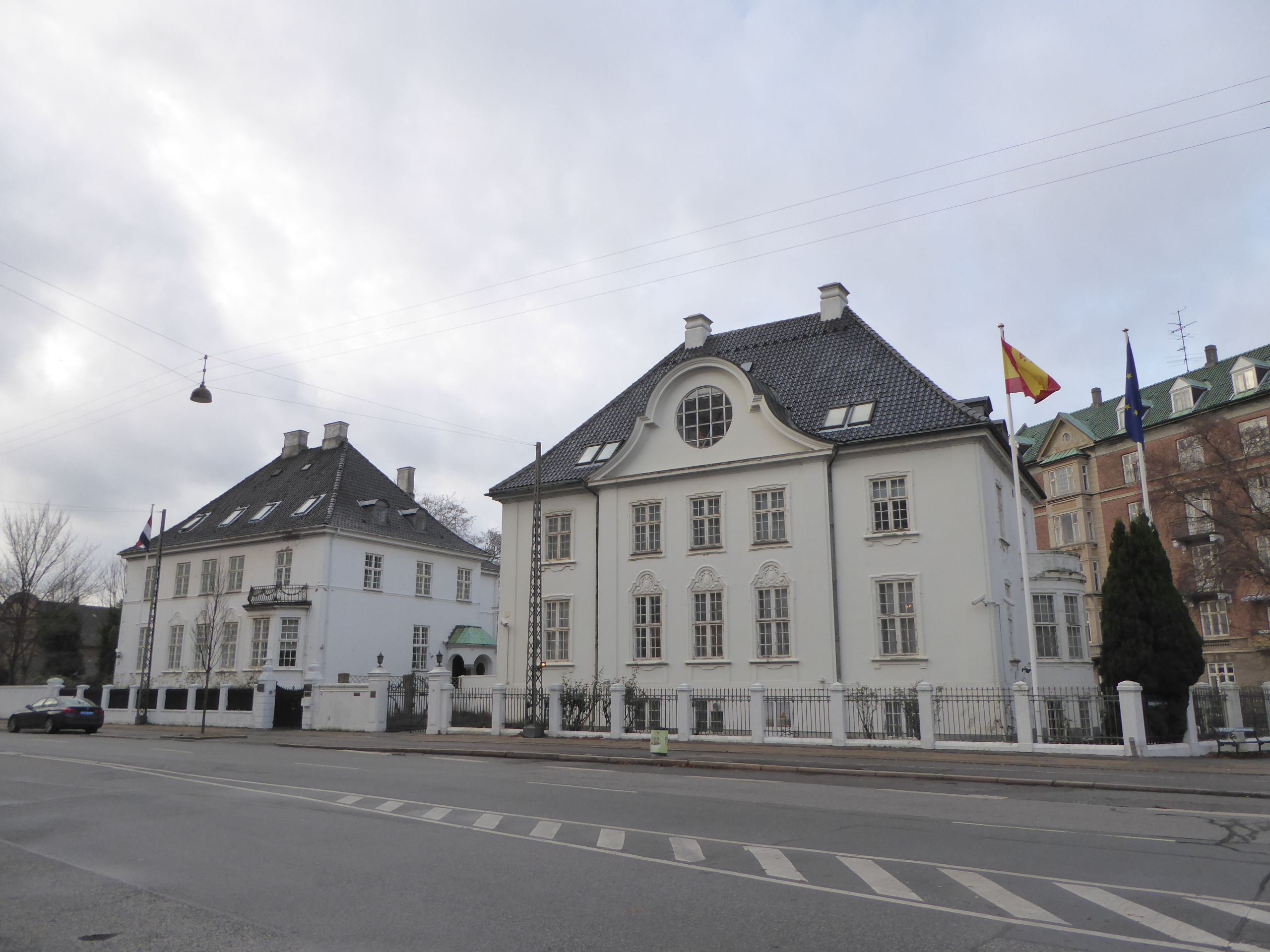
Embassy in Copenhagen

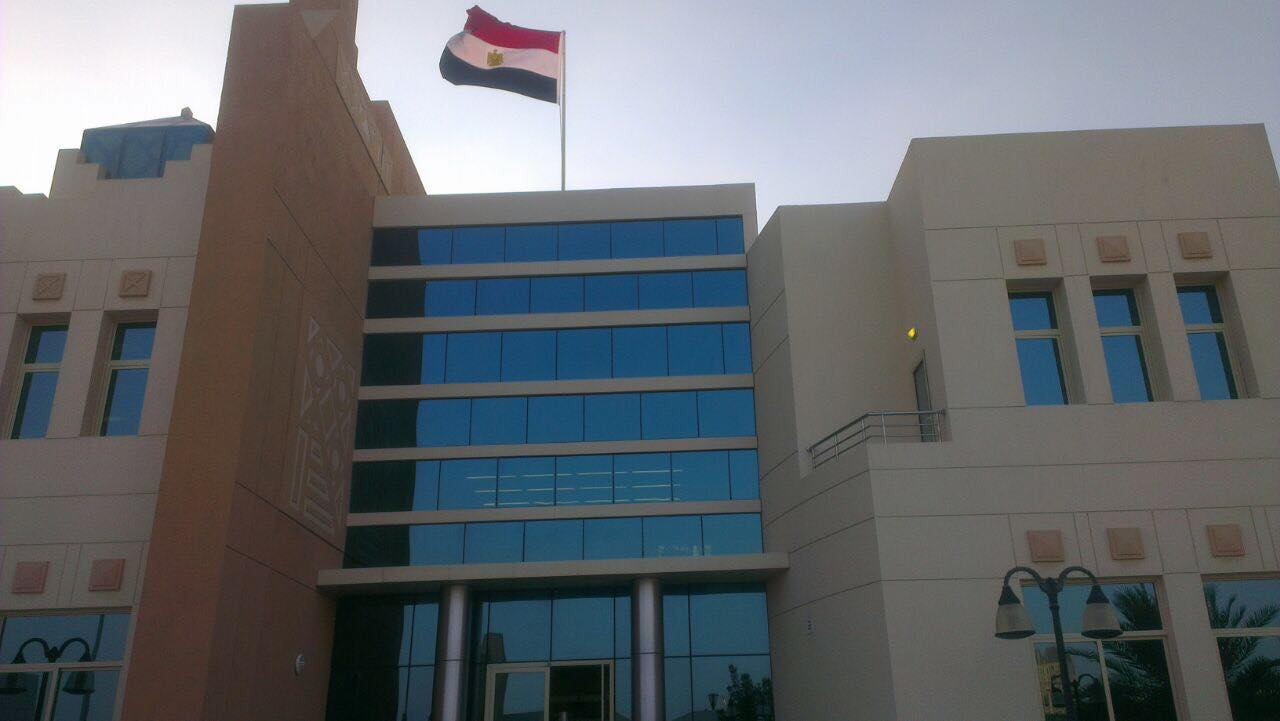
Embassy in Doha

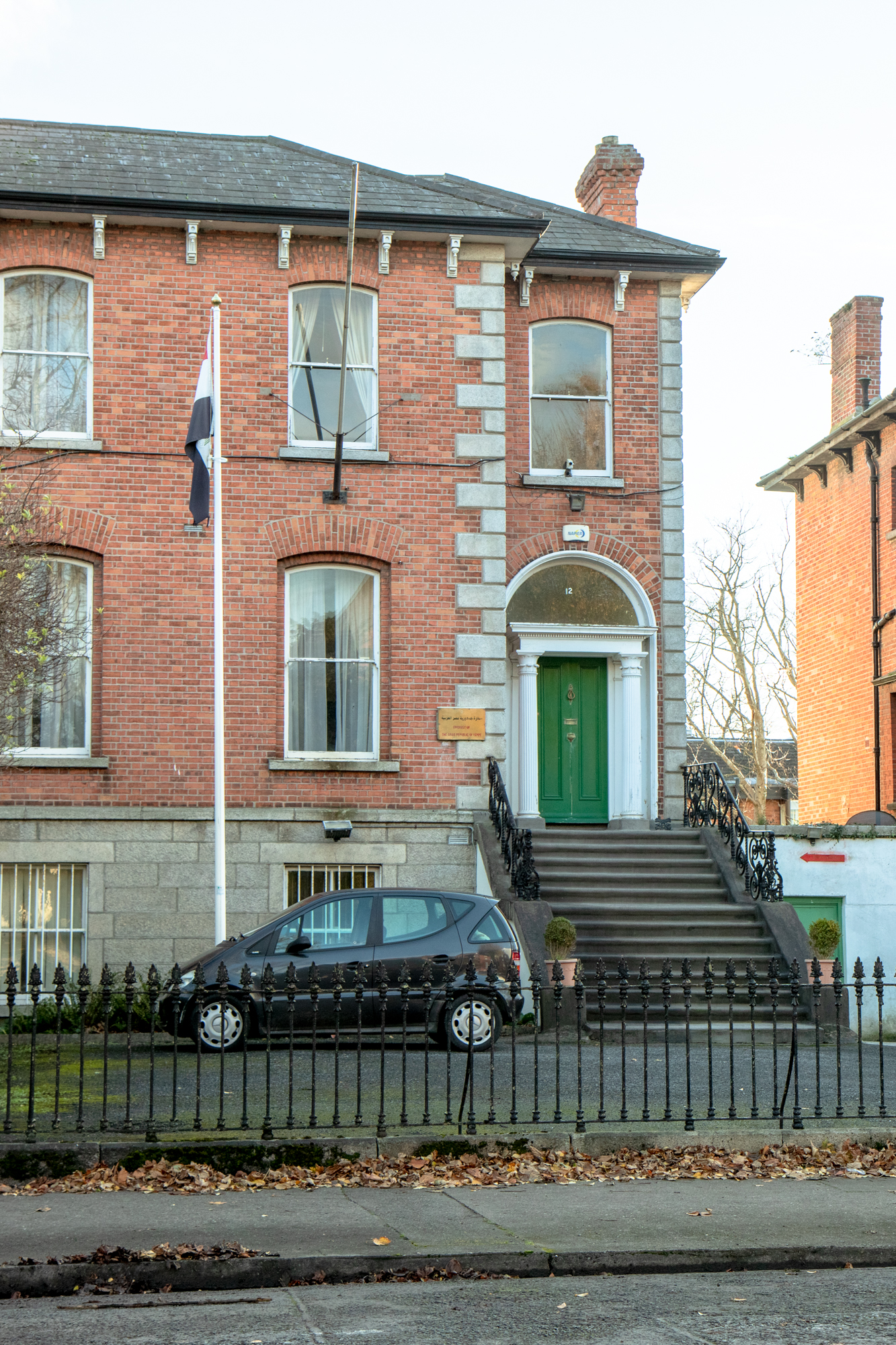
Embassy in Dublin

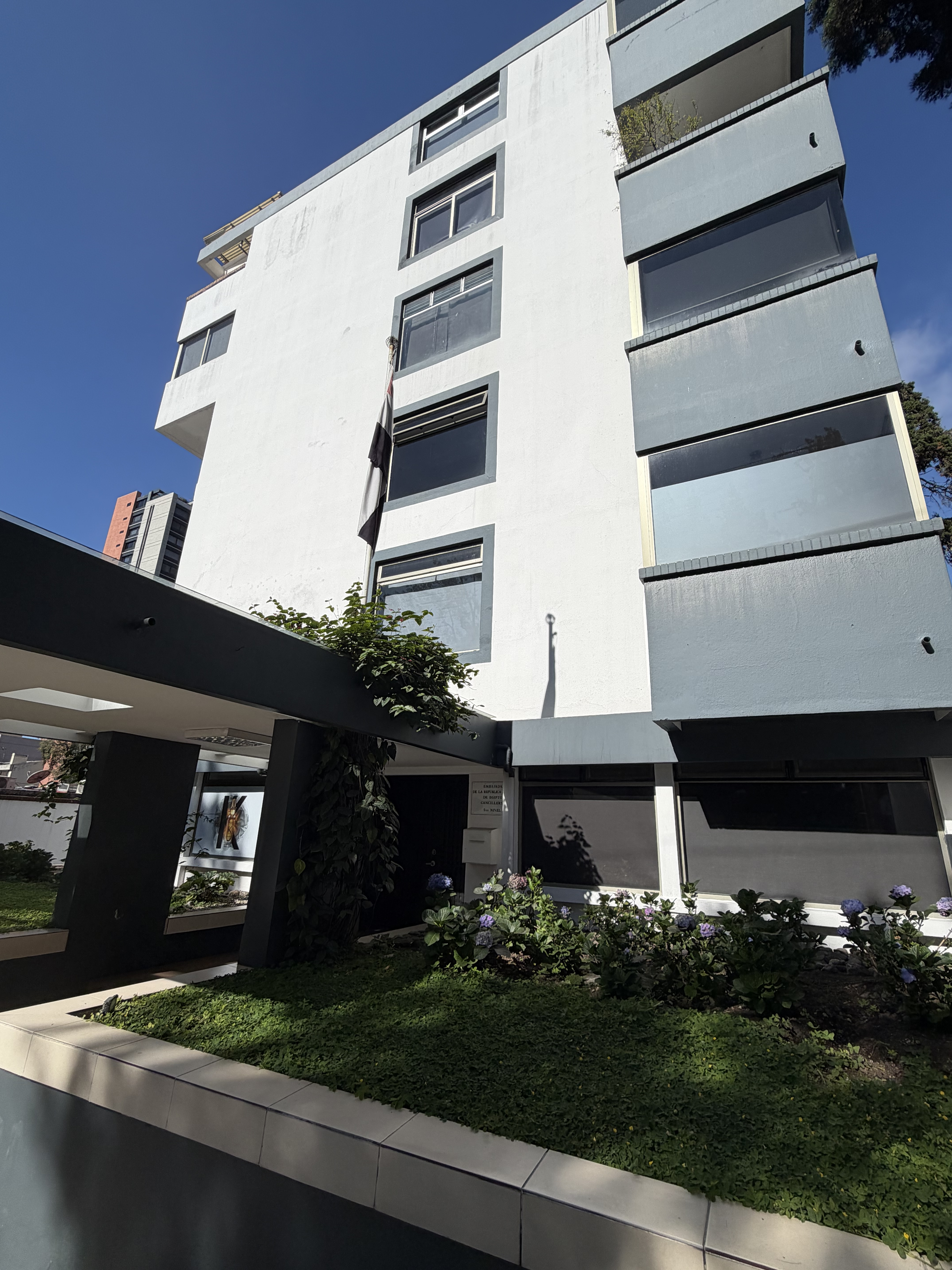
Embassy in Guatemala City

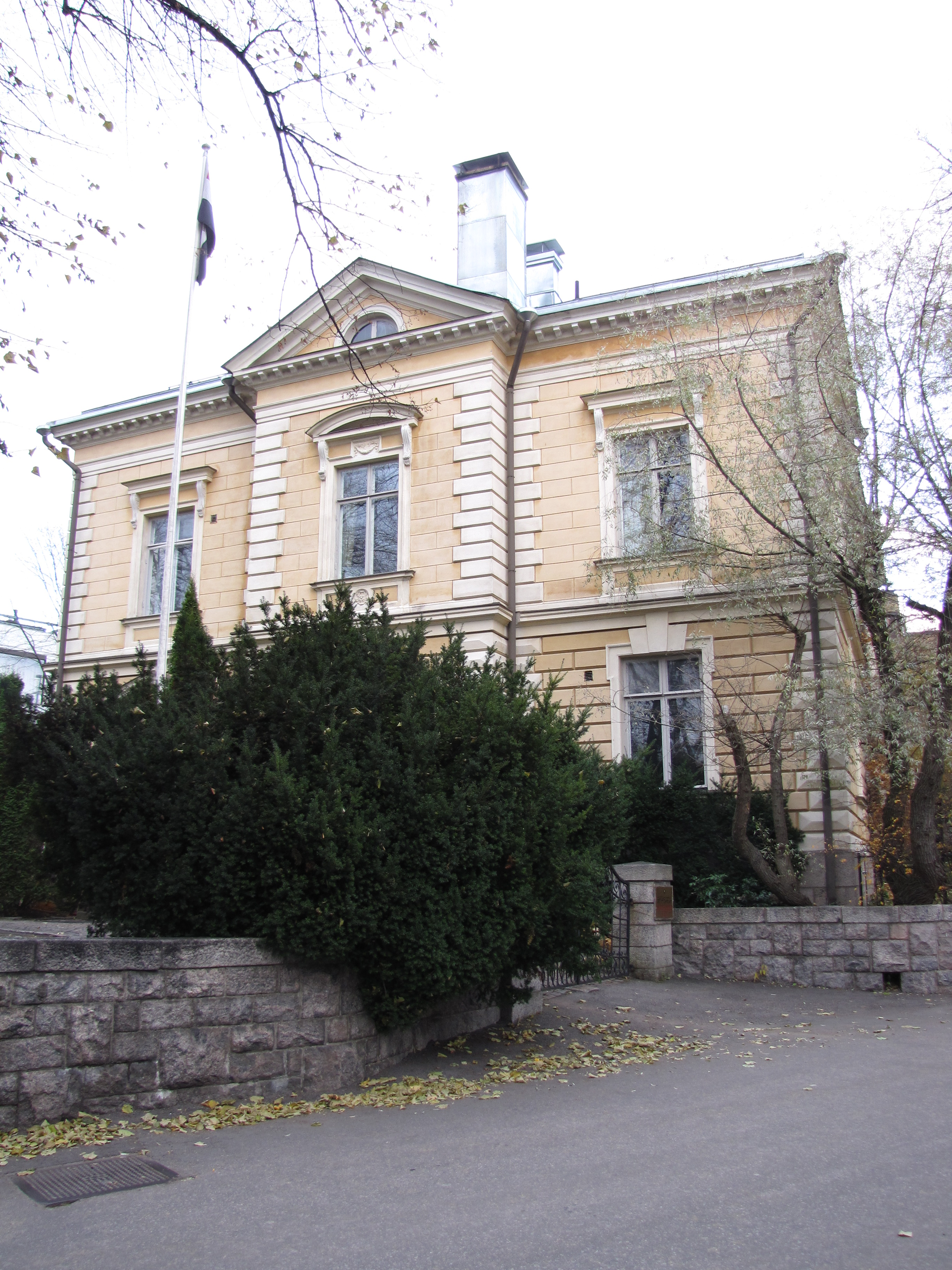
Embassy in Helsinki

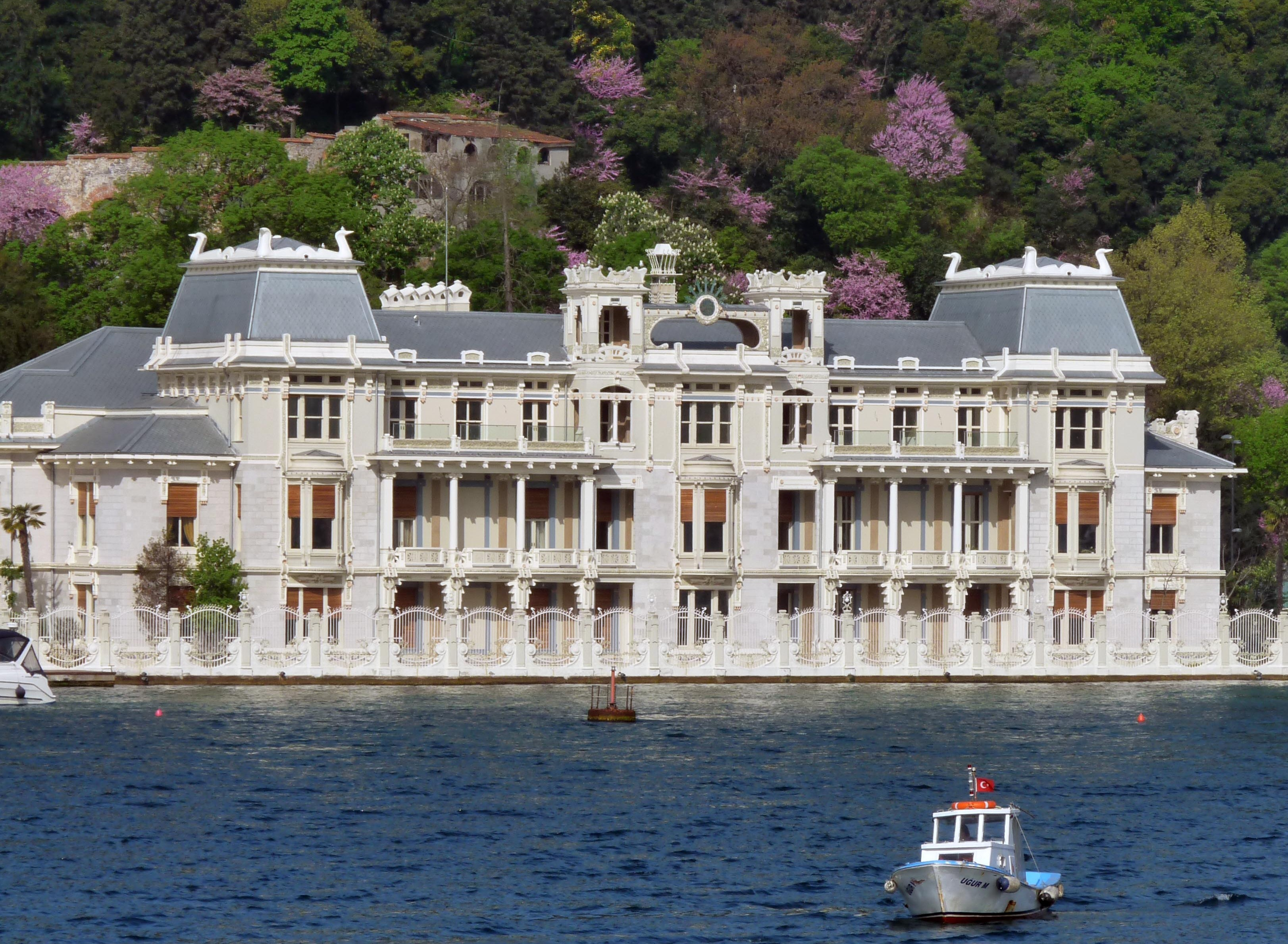
Consulate-General in Istanbul

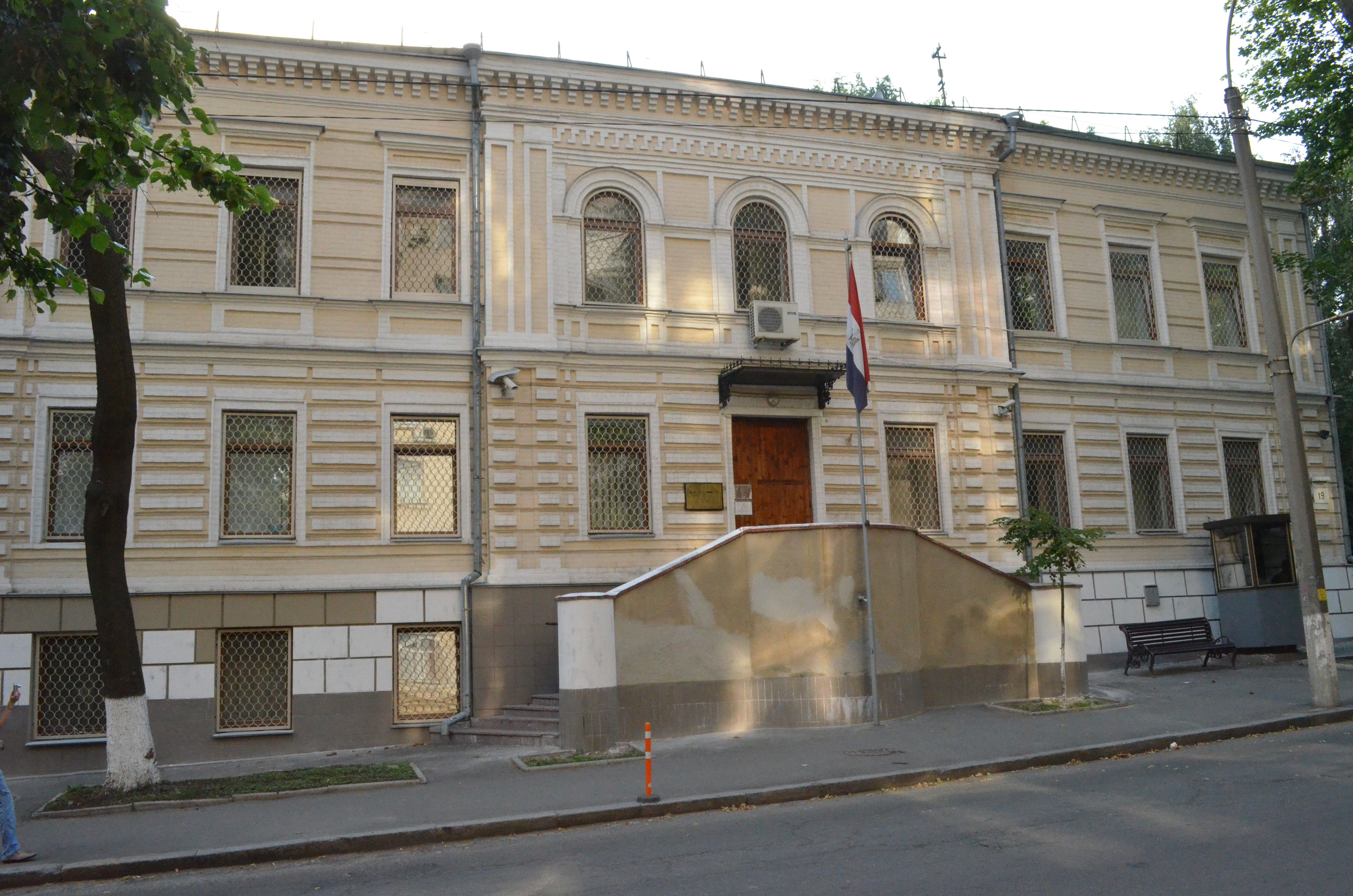
Embassy in Kyiv

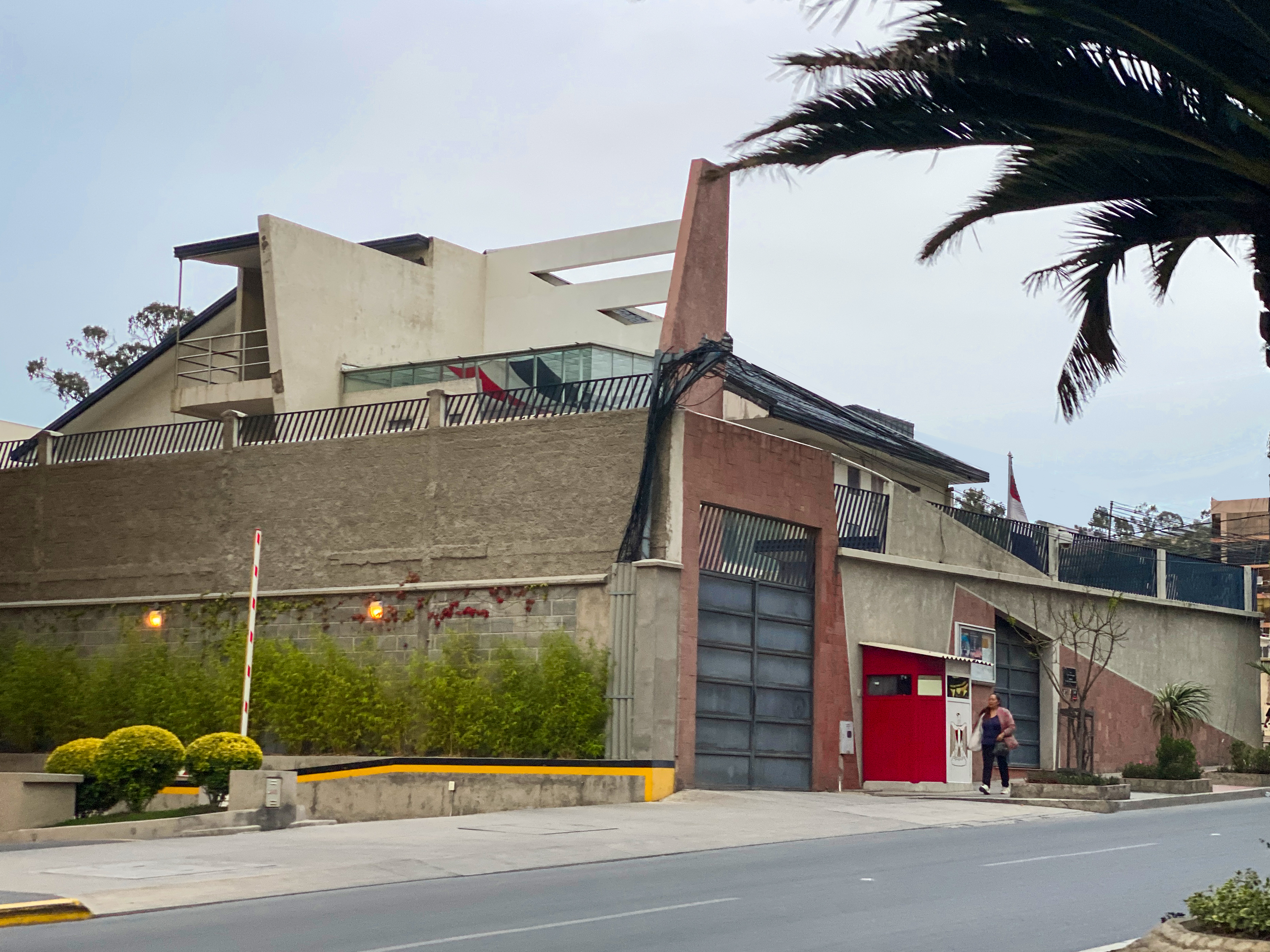
Embassy in La Paz

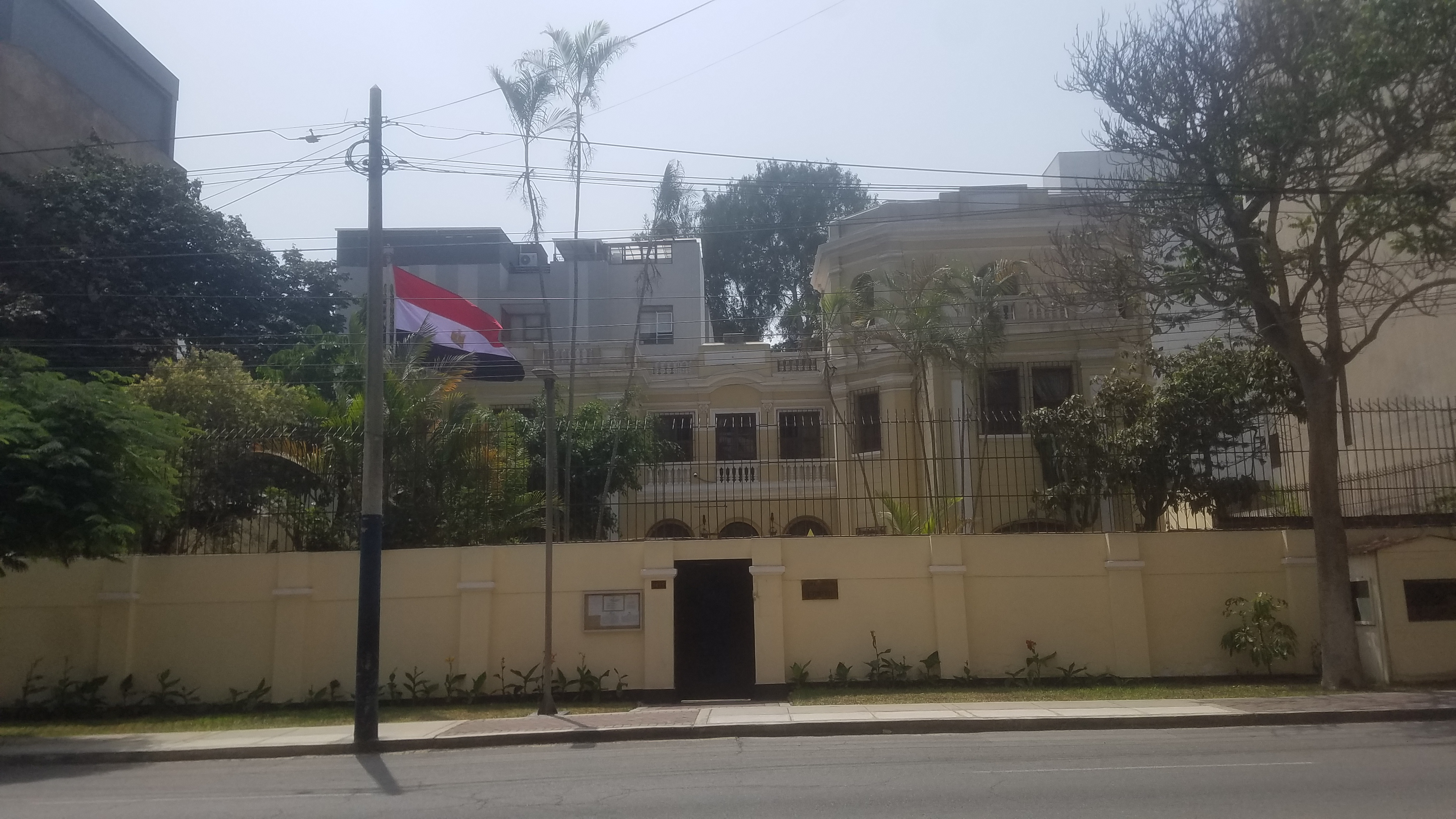
Embassy in Lima

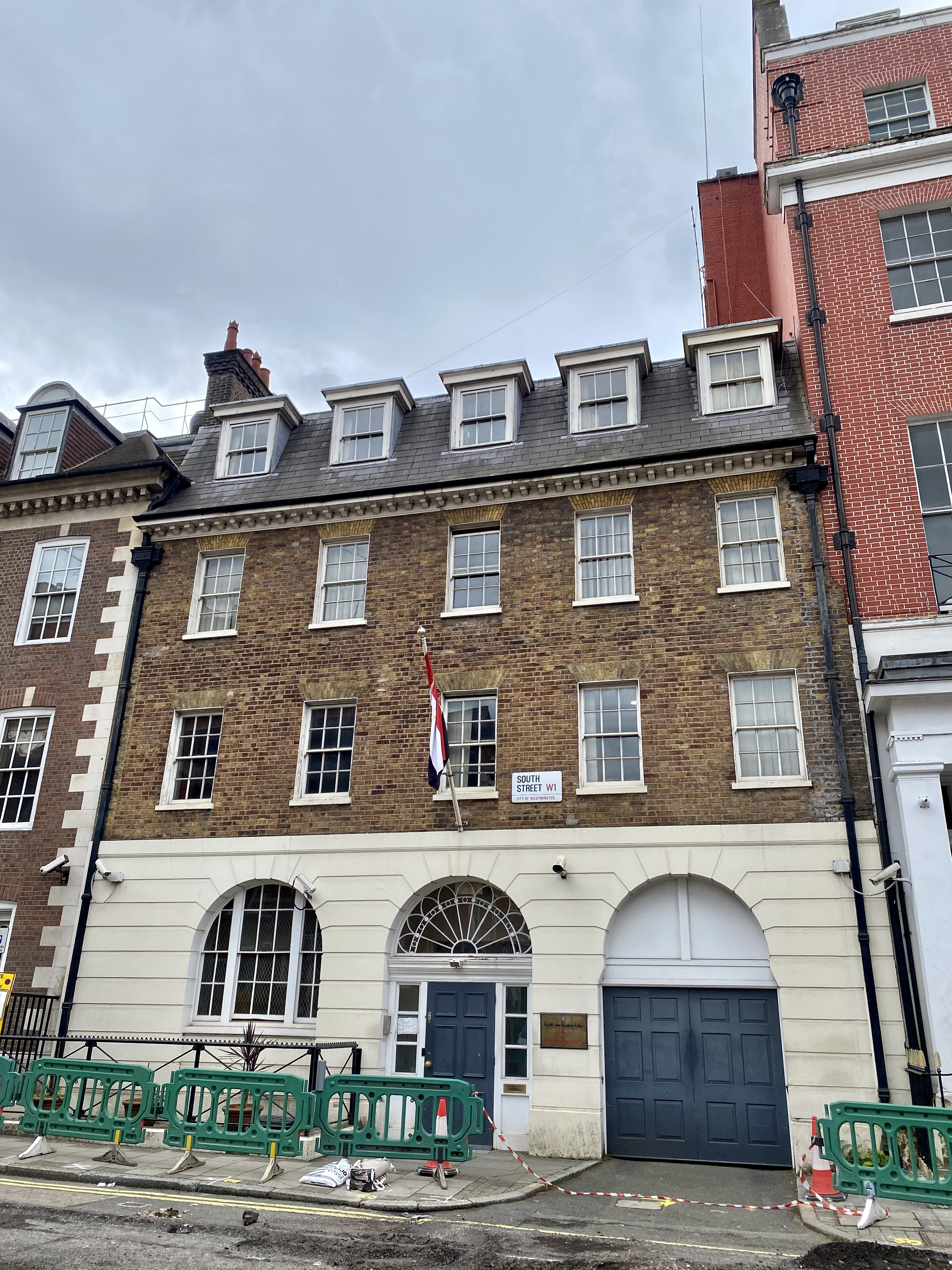
Embassy in London

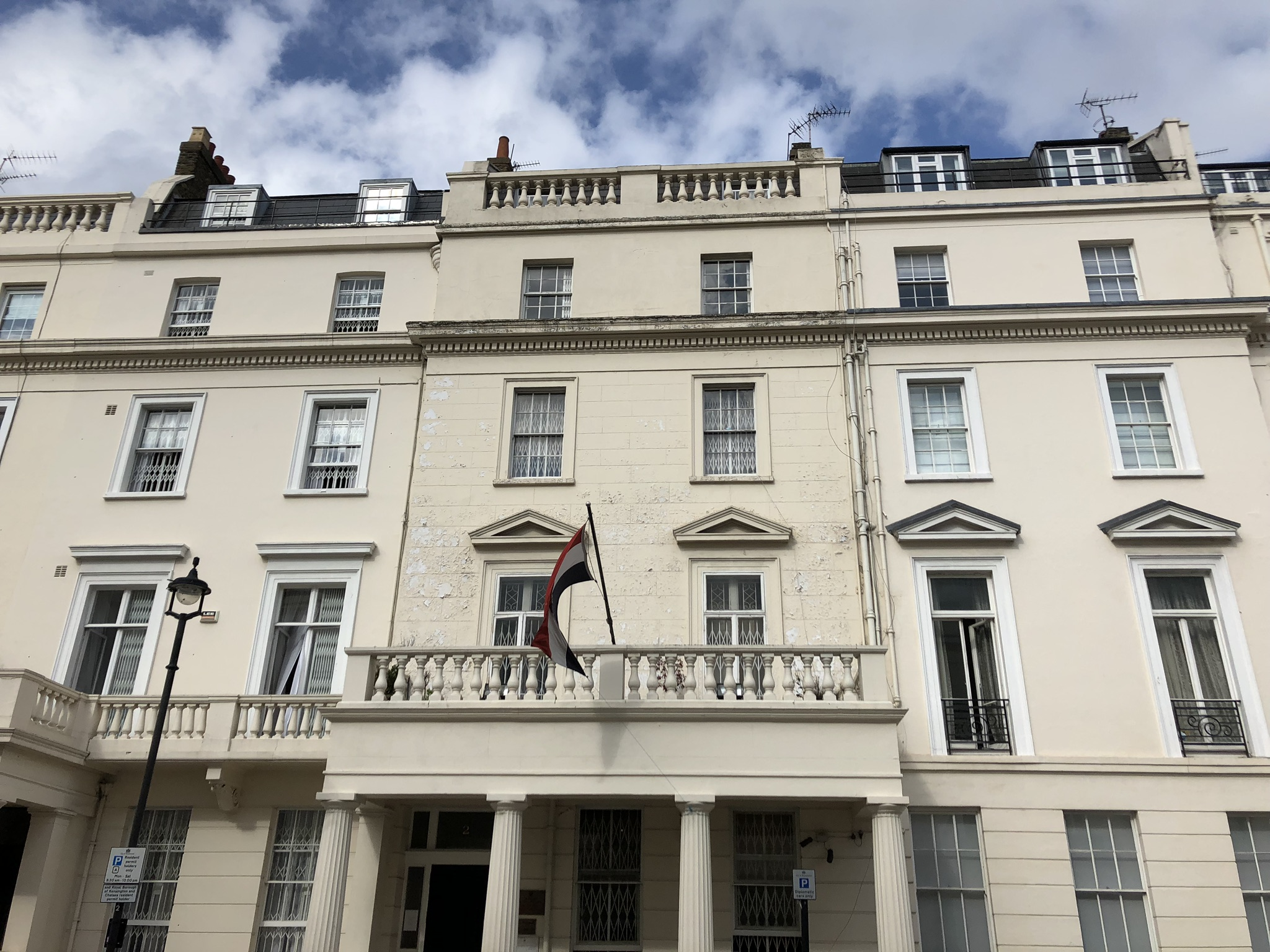
Consulate-General in London

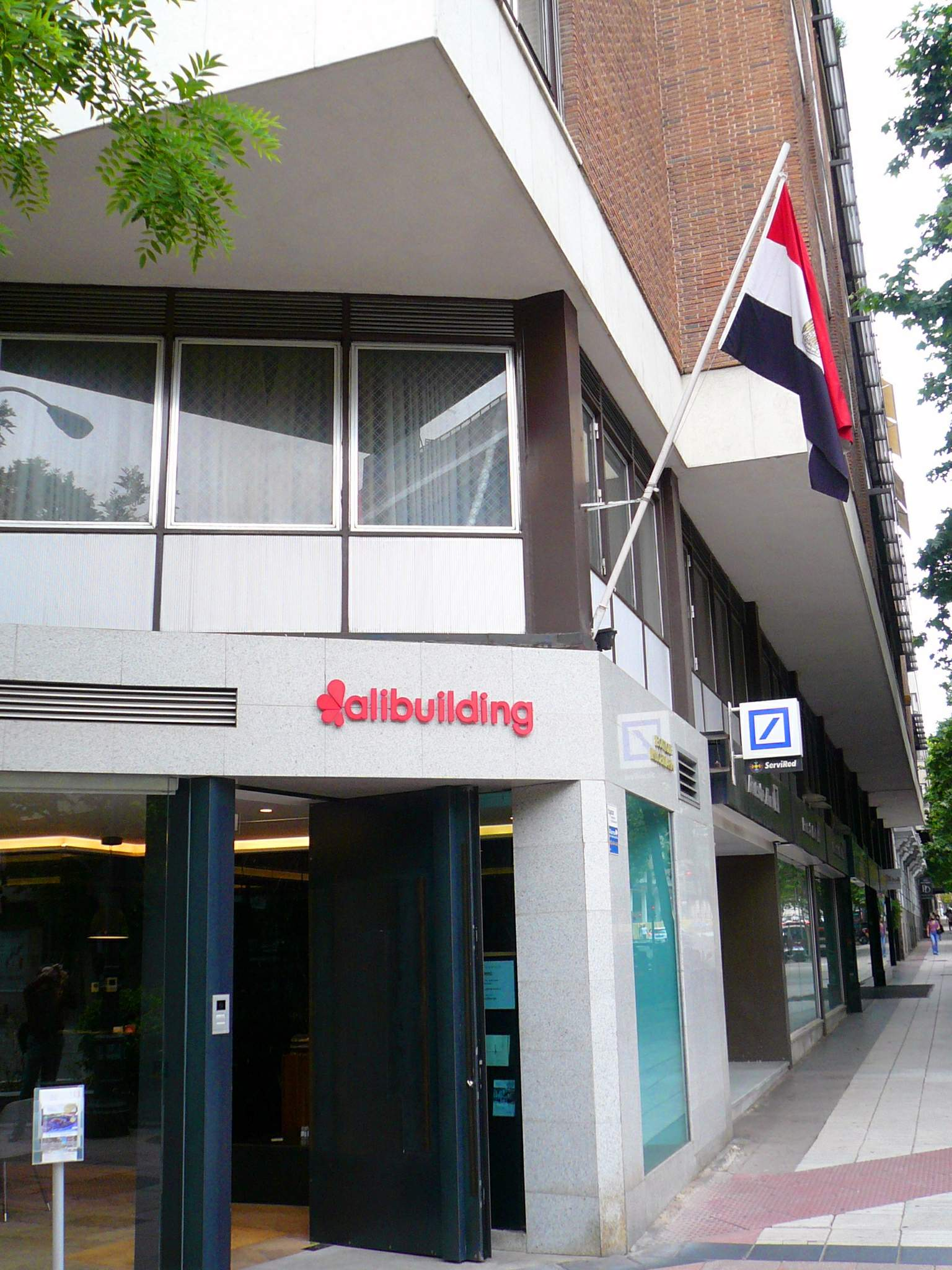
Embassy in Madrid

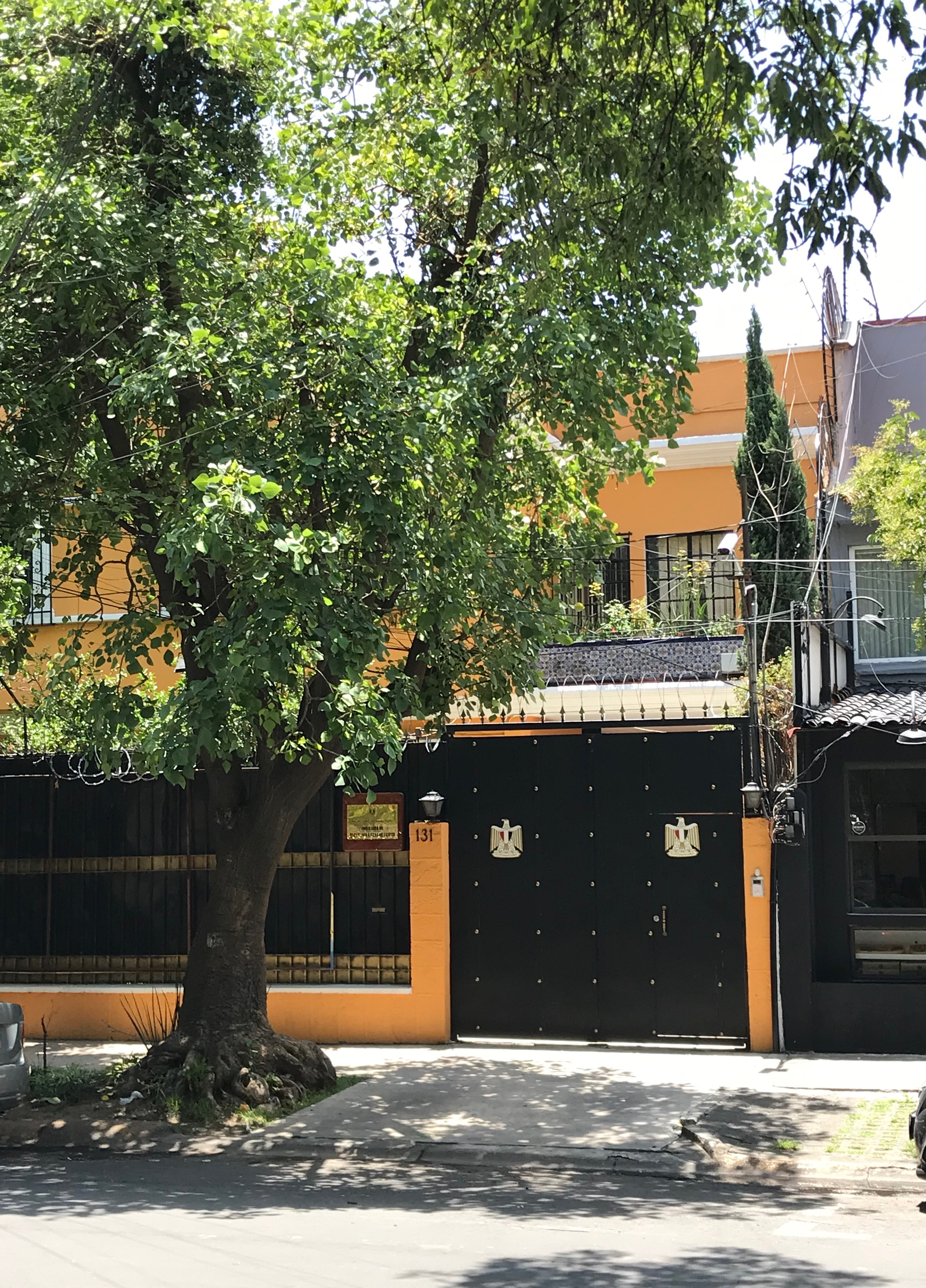
Embassy in Mexico City

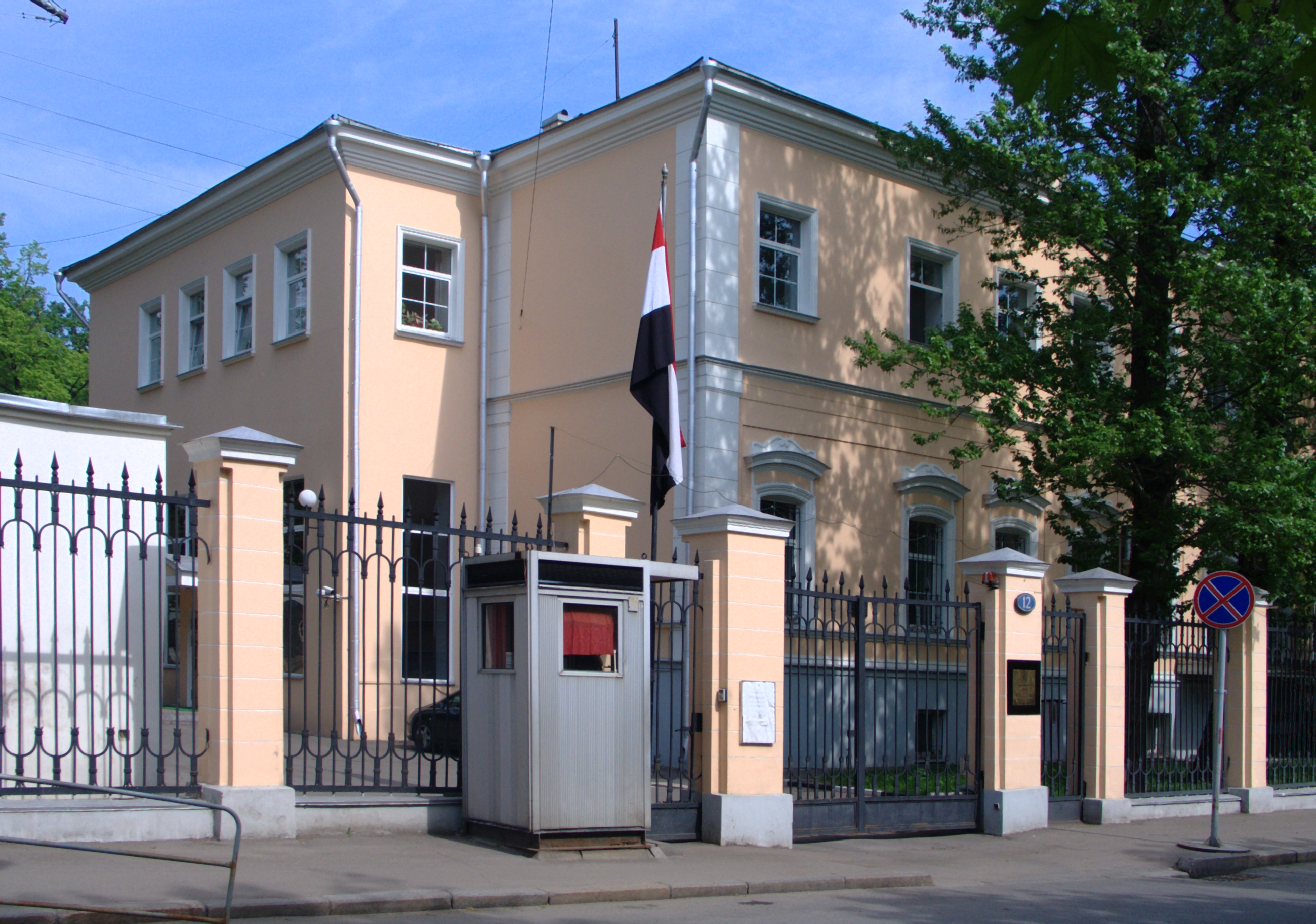
Embassy in Moscow

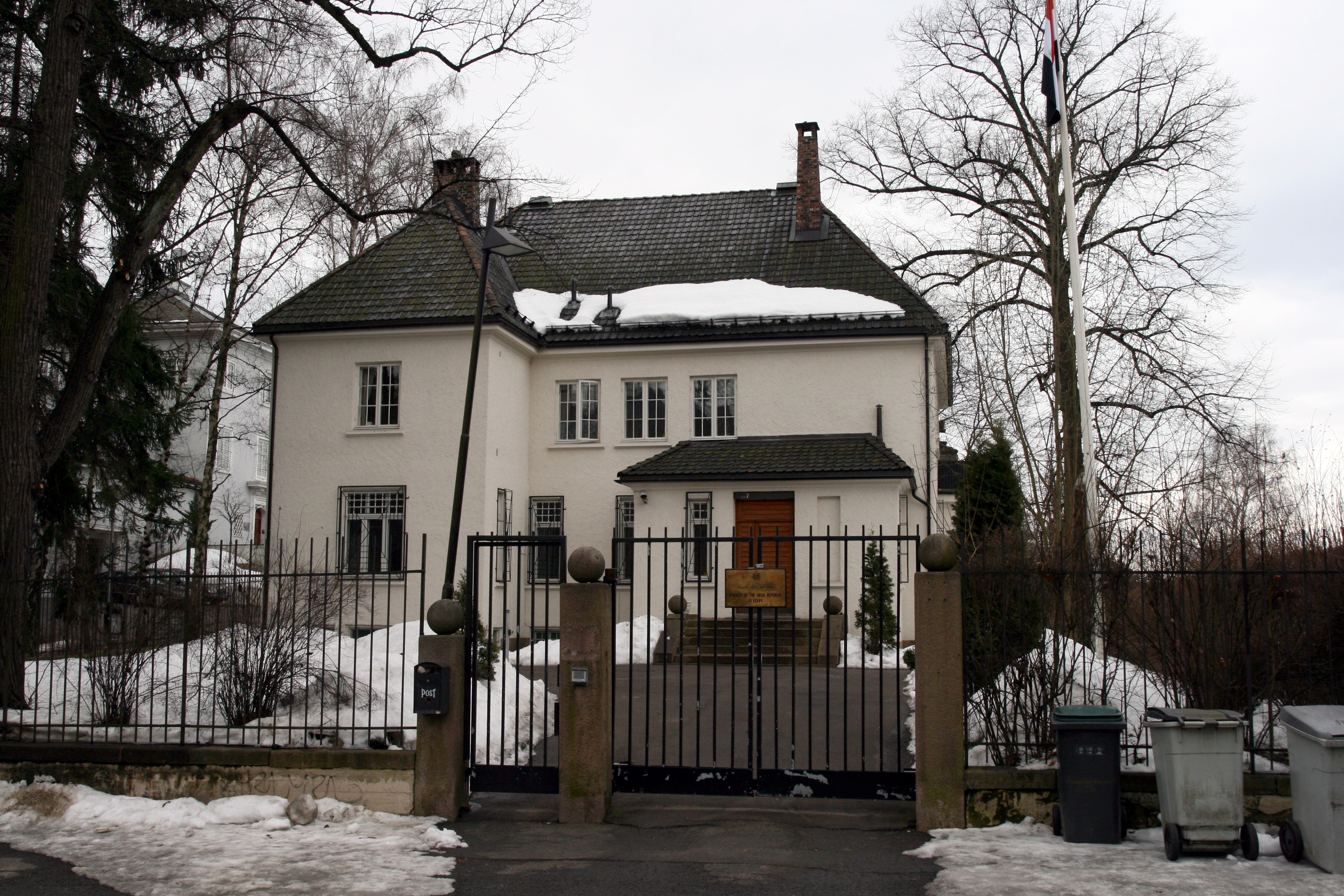
Embassy in Oslo

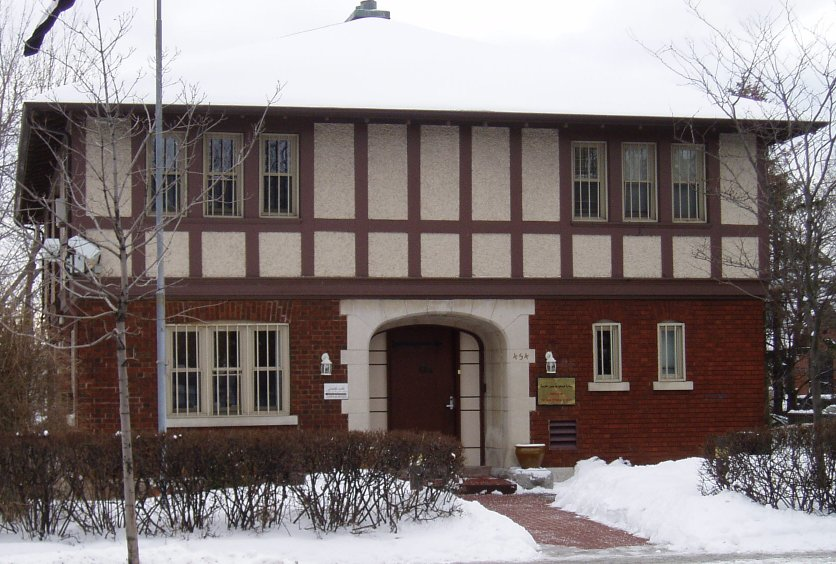
Embassy in Ottawa

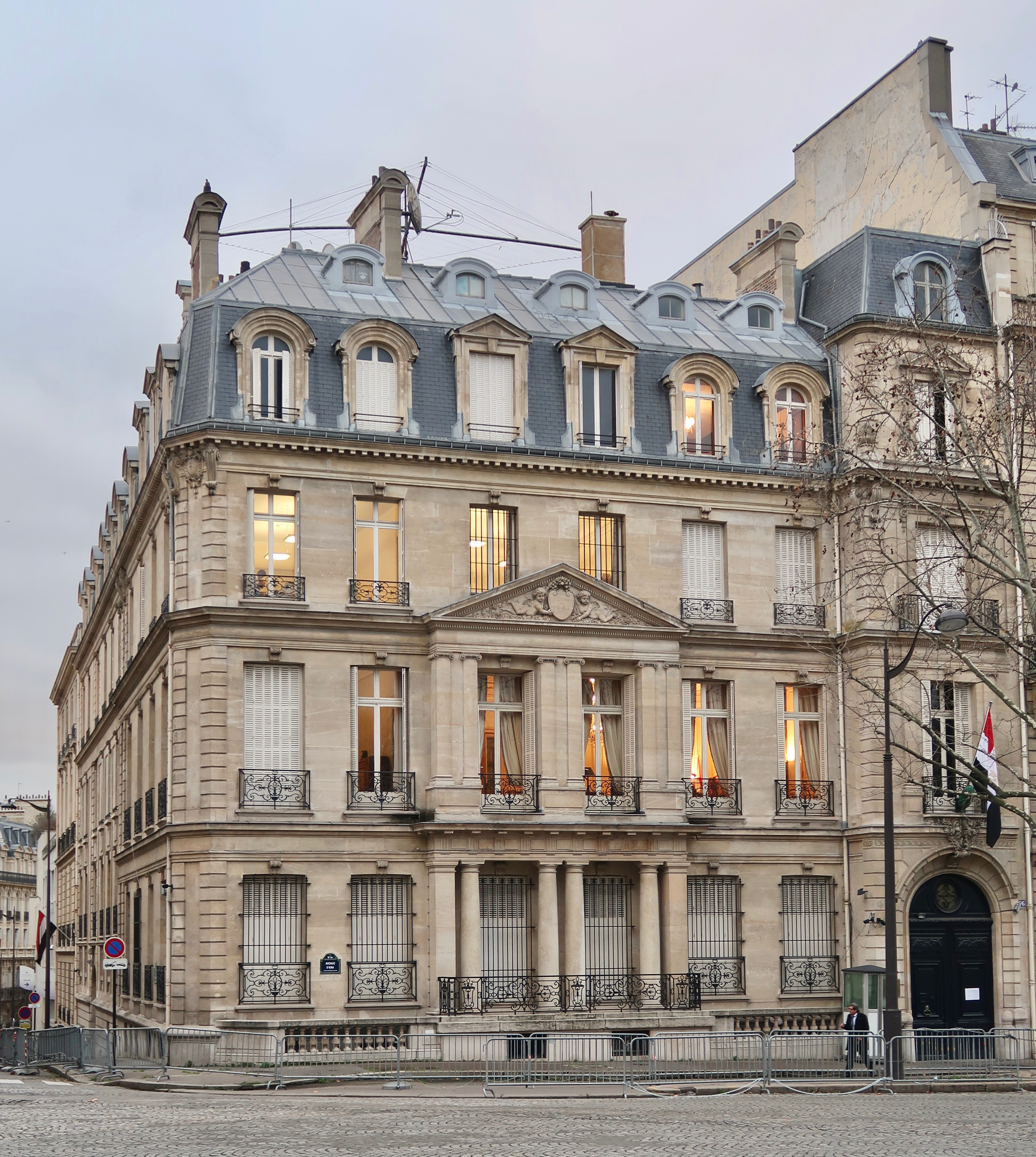
Embassy in Paris

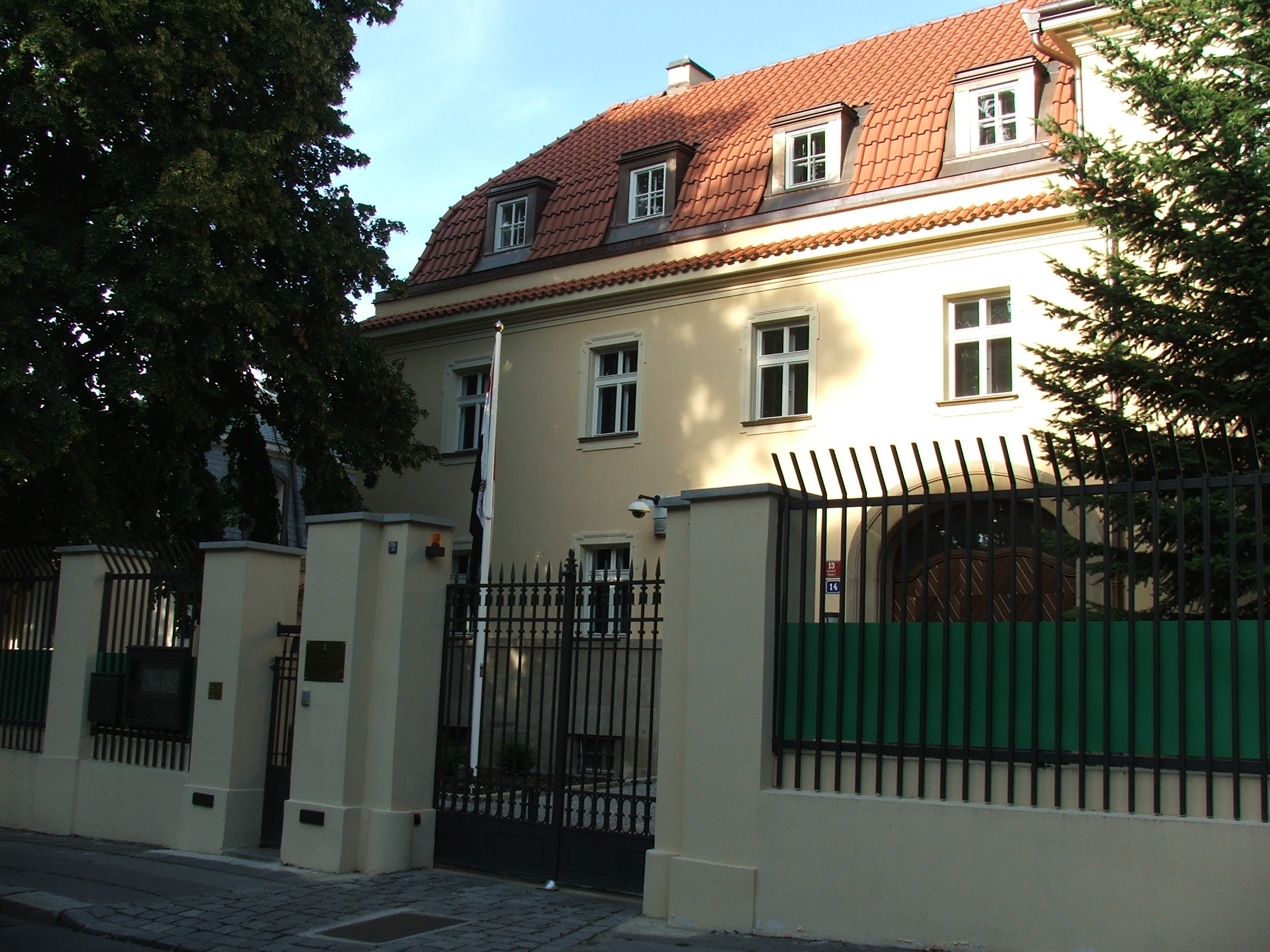
Embassy in Prague

Embassy in Quito

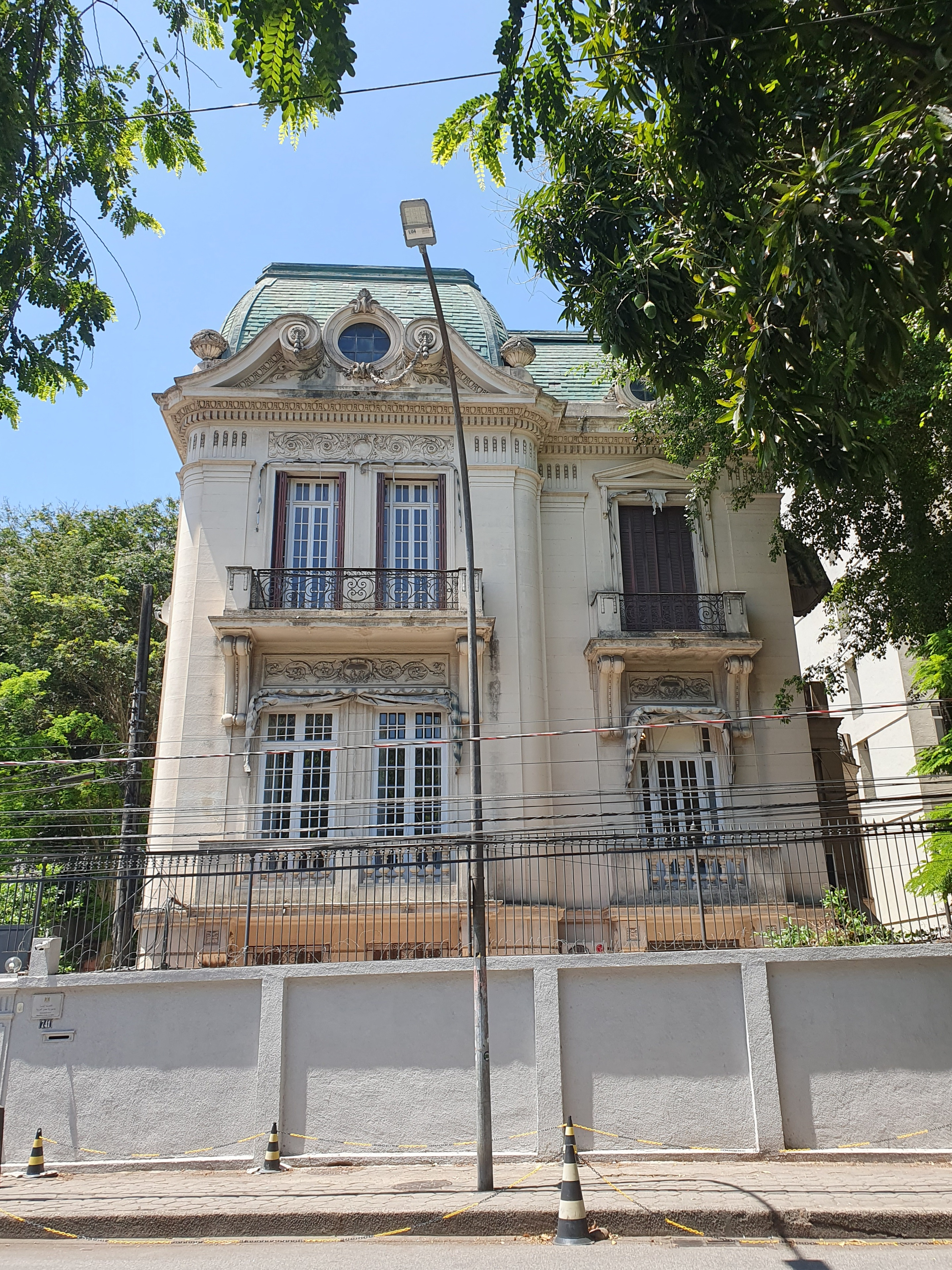
Consulate-General in Rio de Janeiro

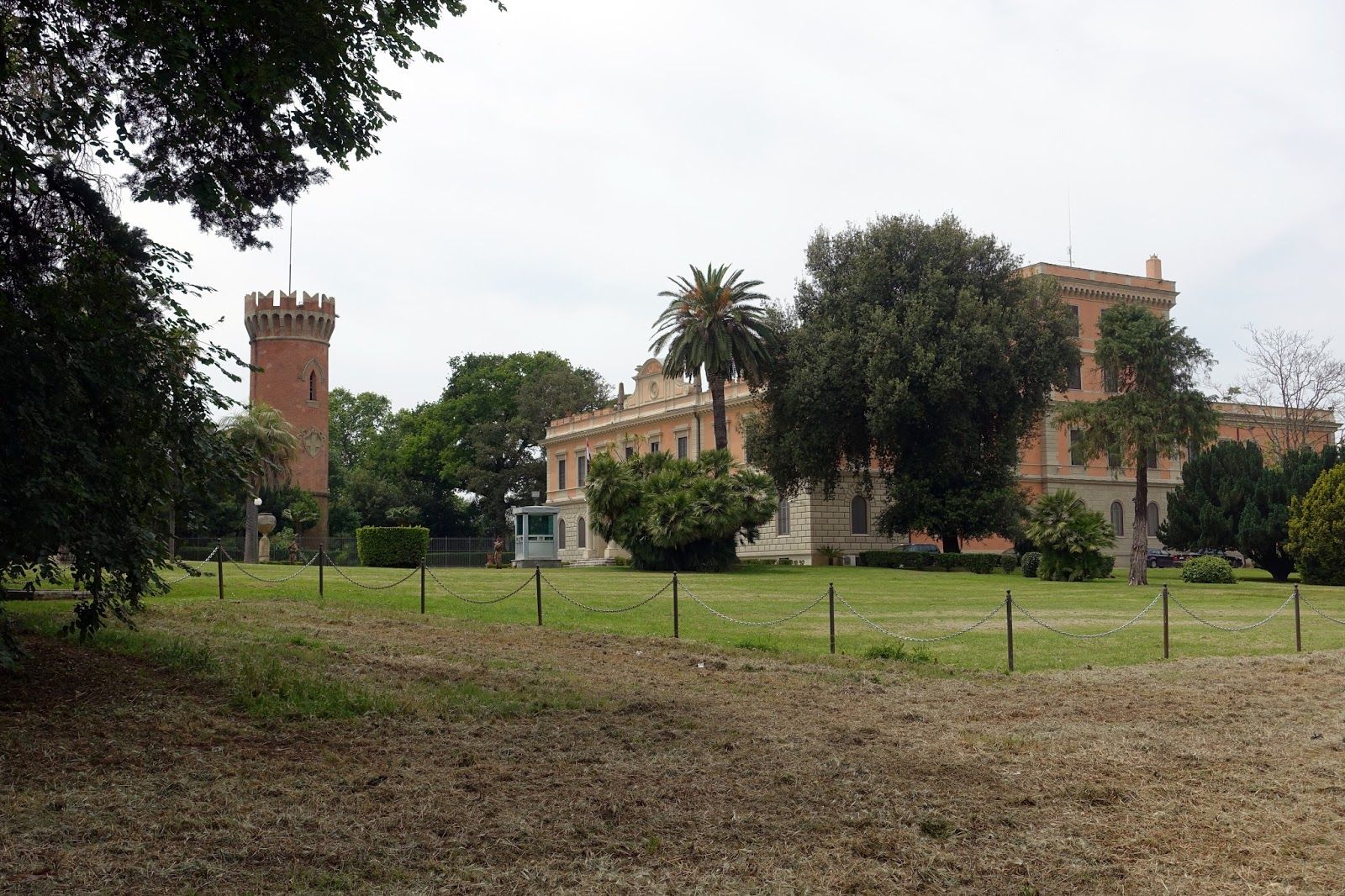
Embassy in Rome

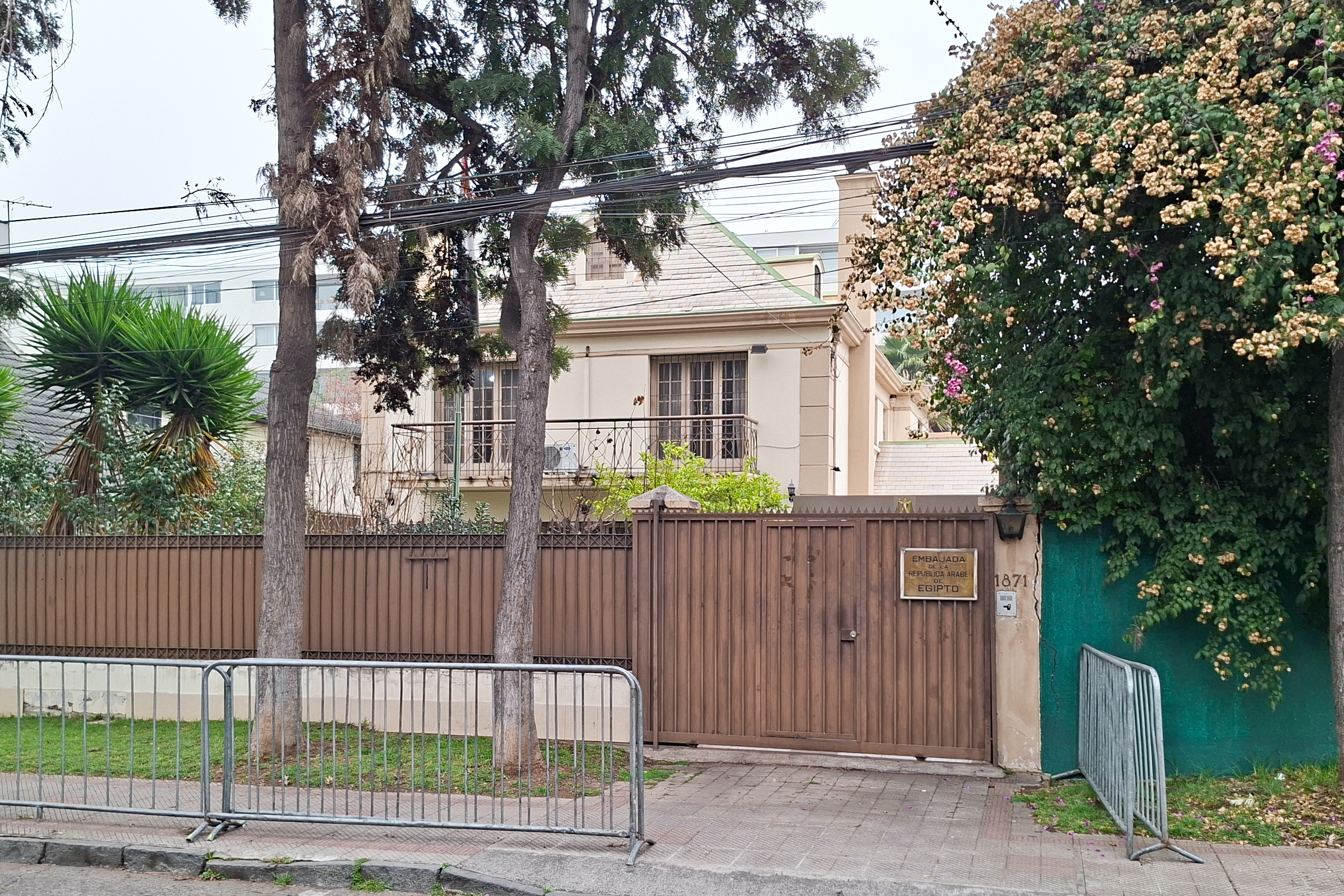
Embassy in Santiago

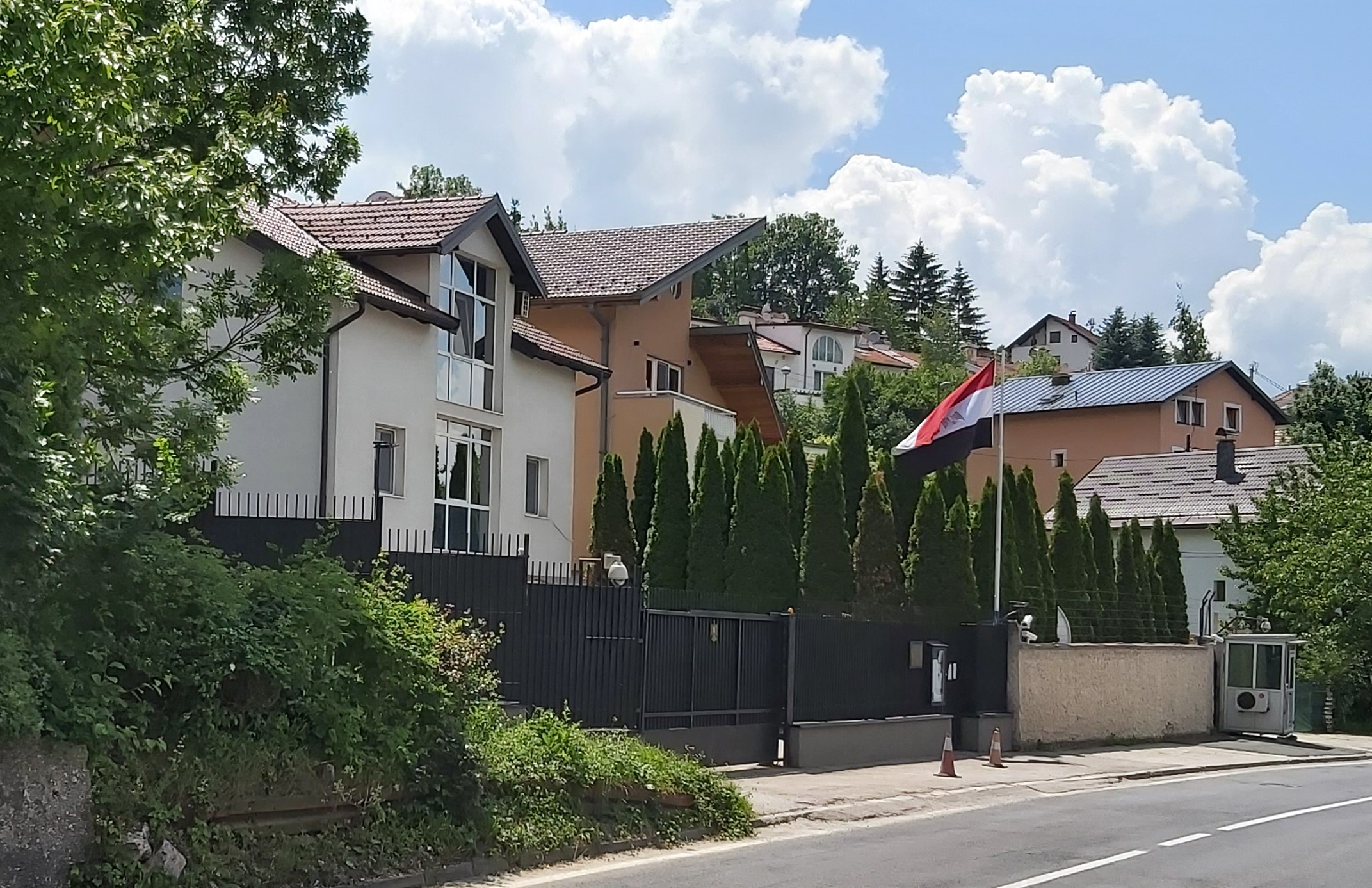
Embassy in Sarajevo

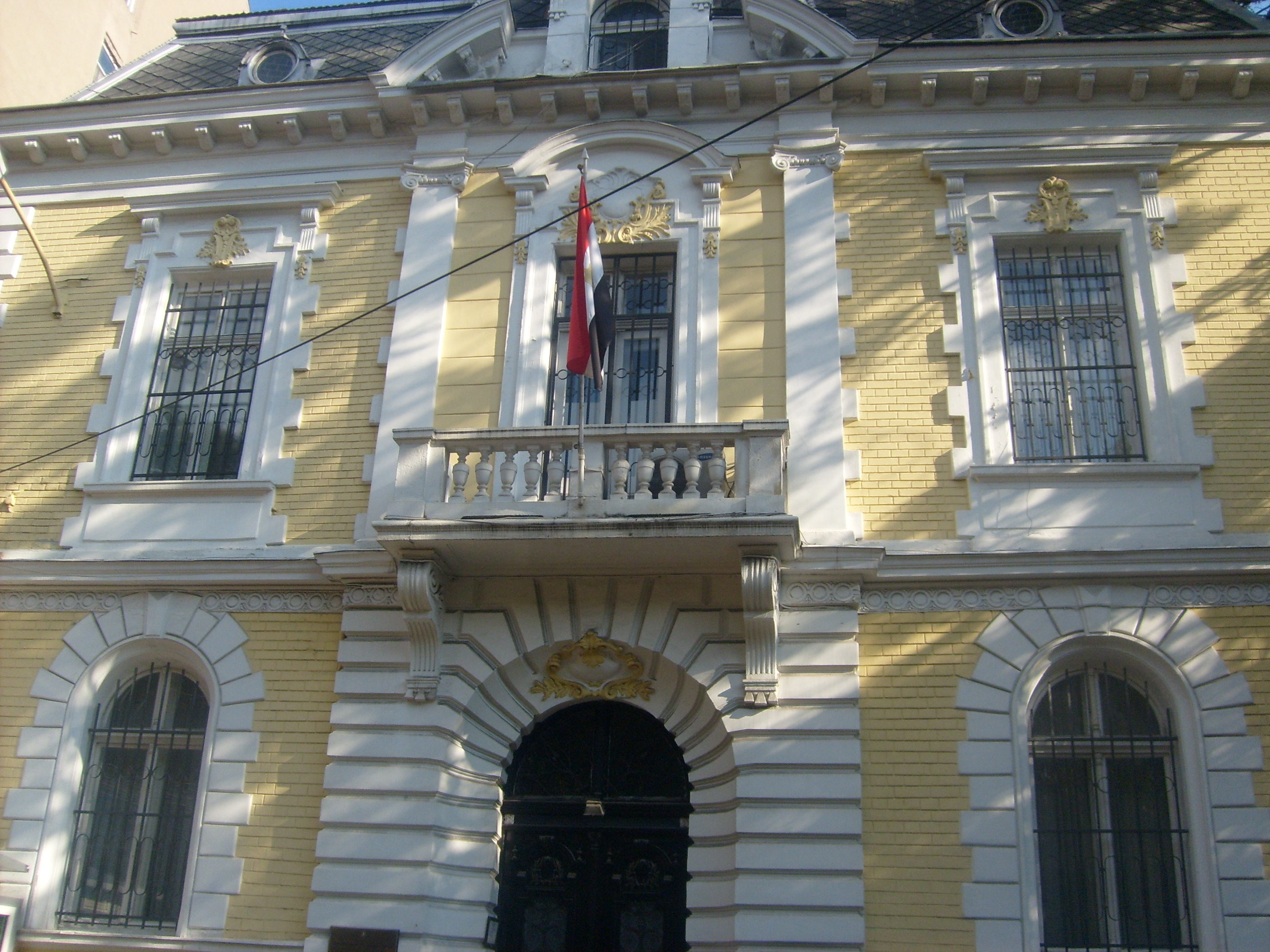
Embassy in Sofia

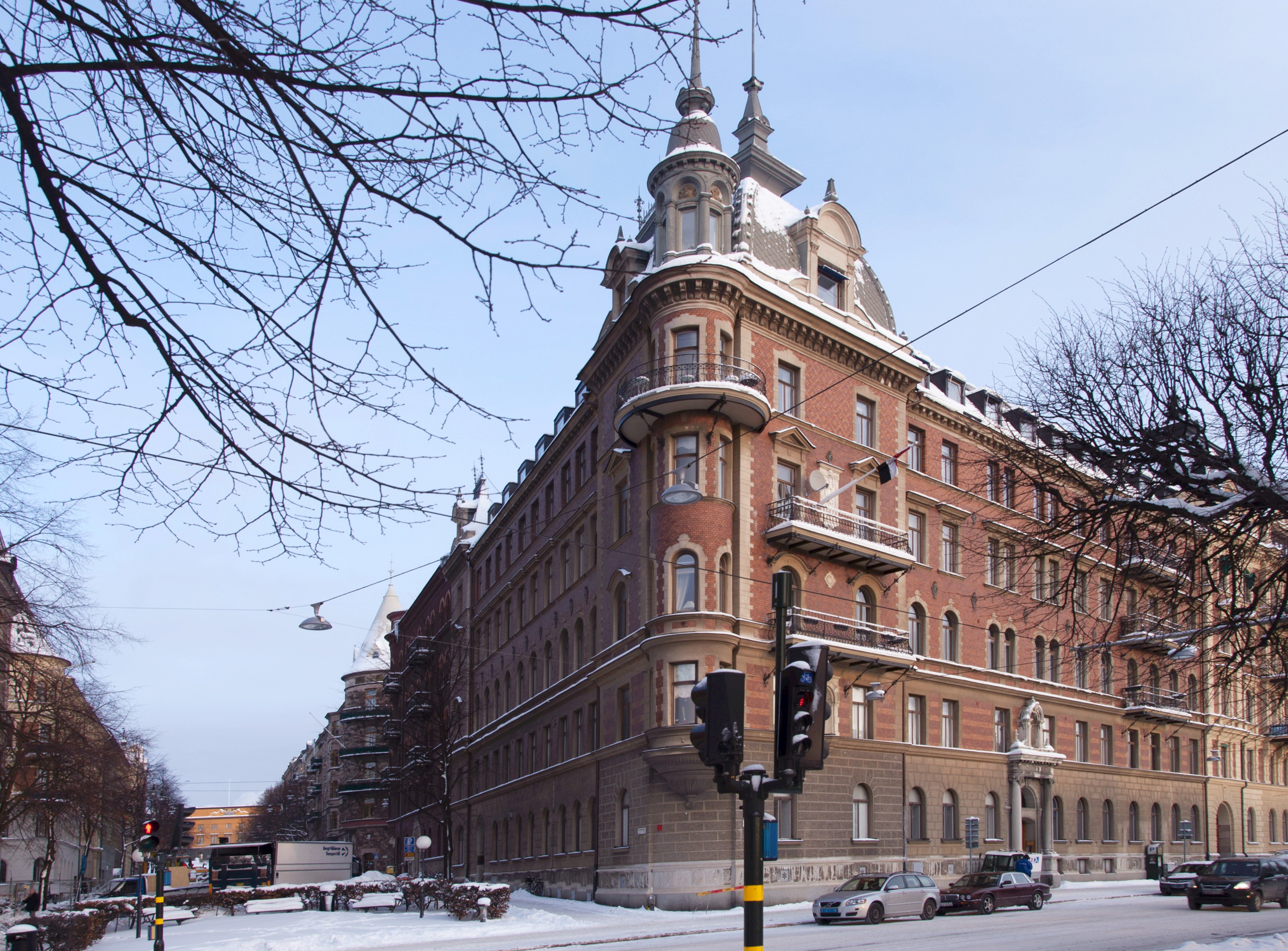
Embassy in Stockholm

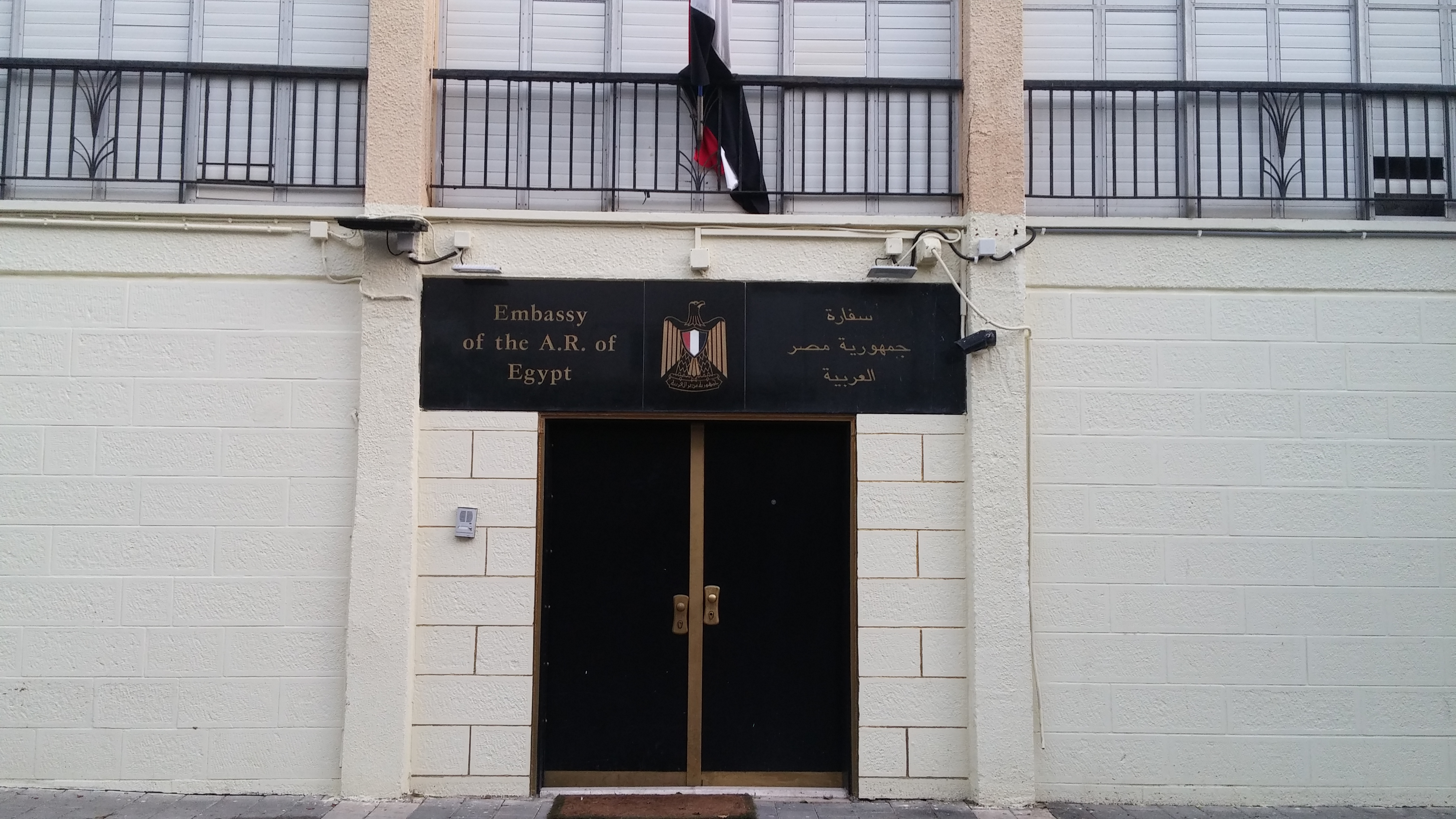
Embassy in Tel Aviv

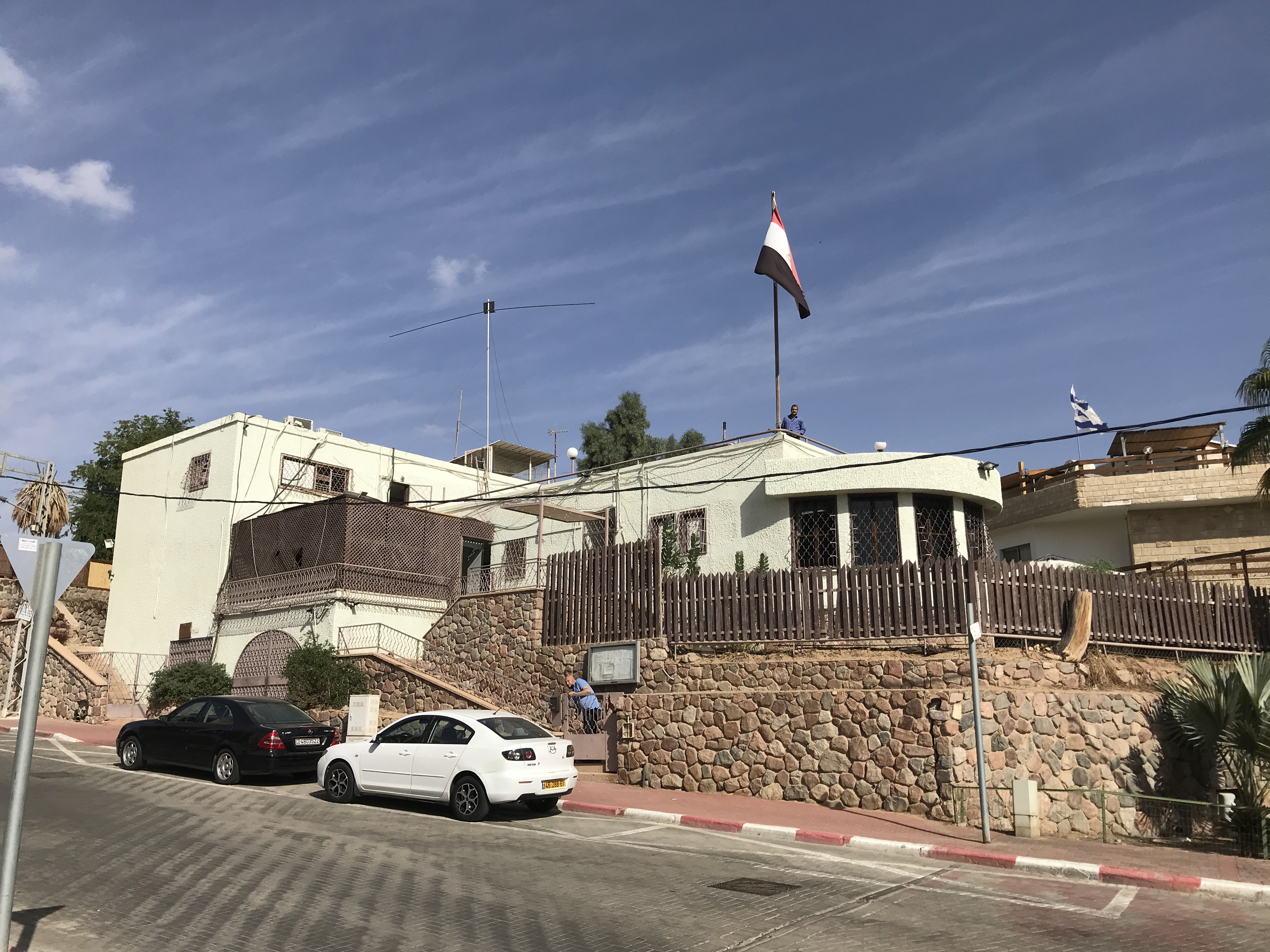
Consulate in Eilat

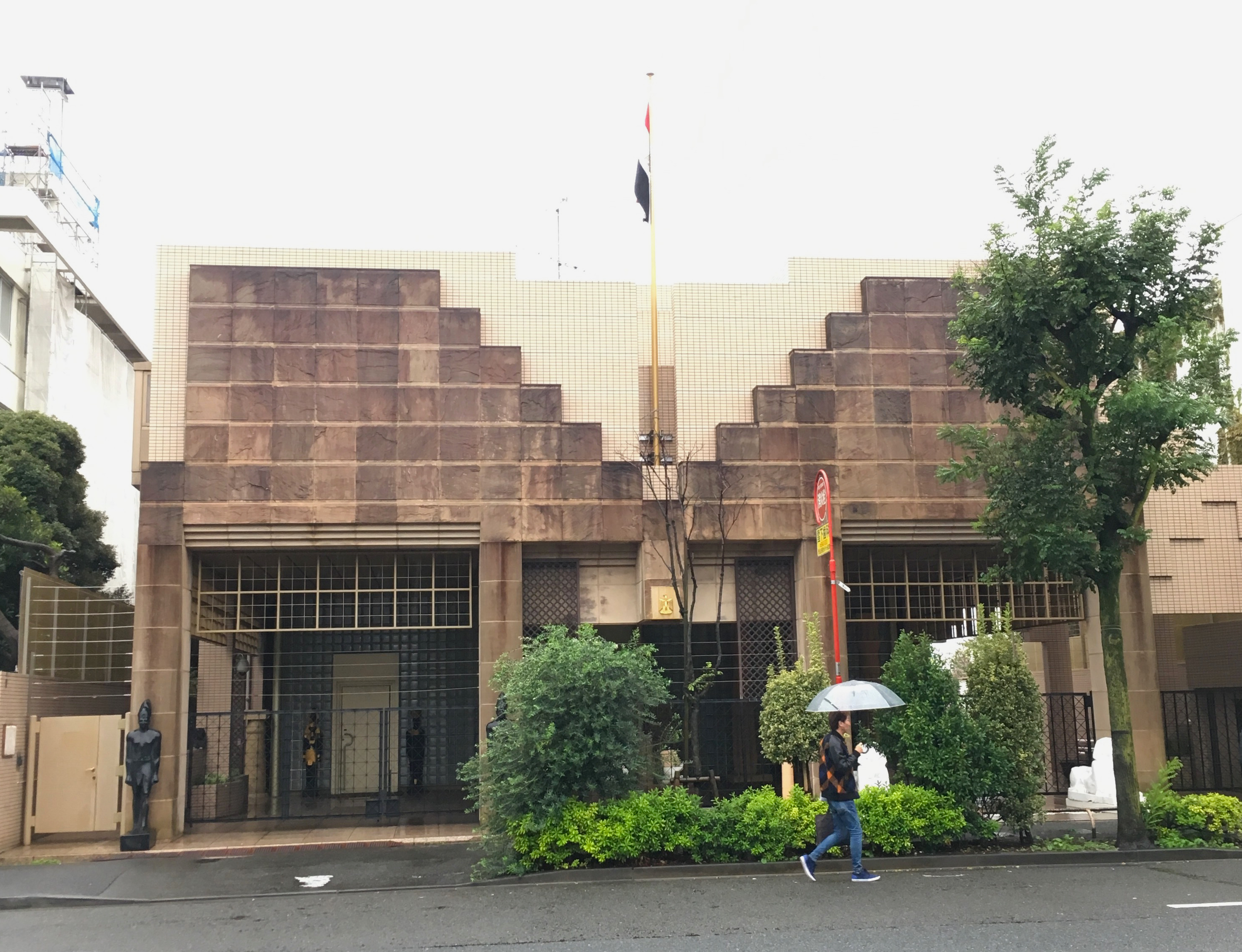
Embassy in Tokyo

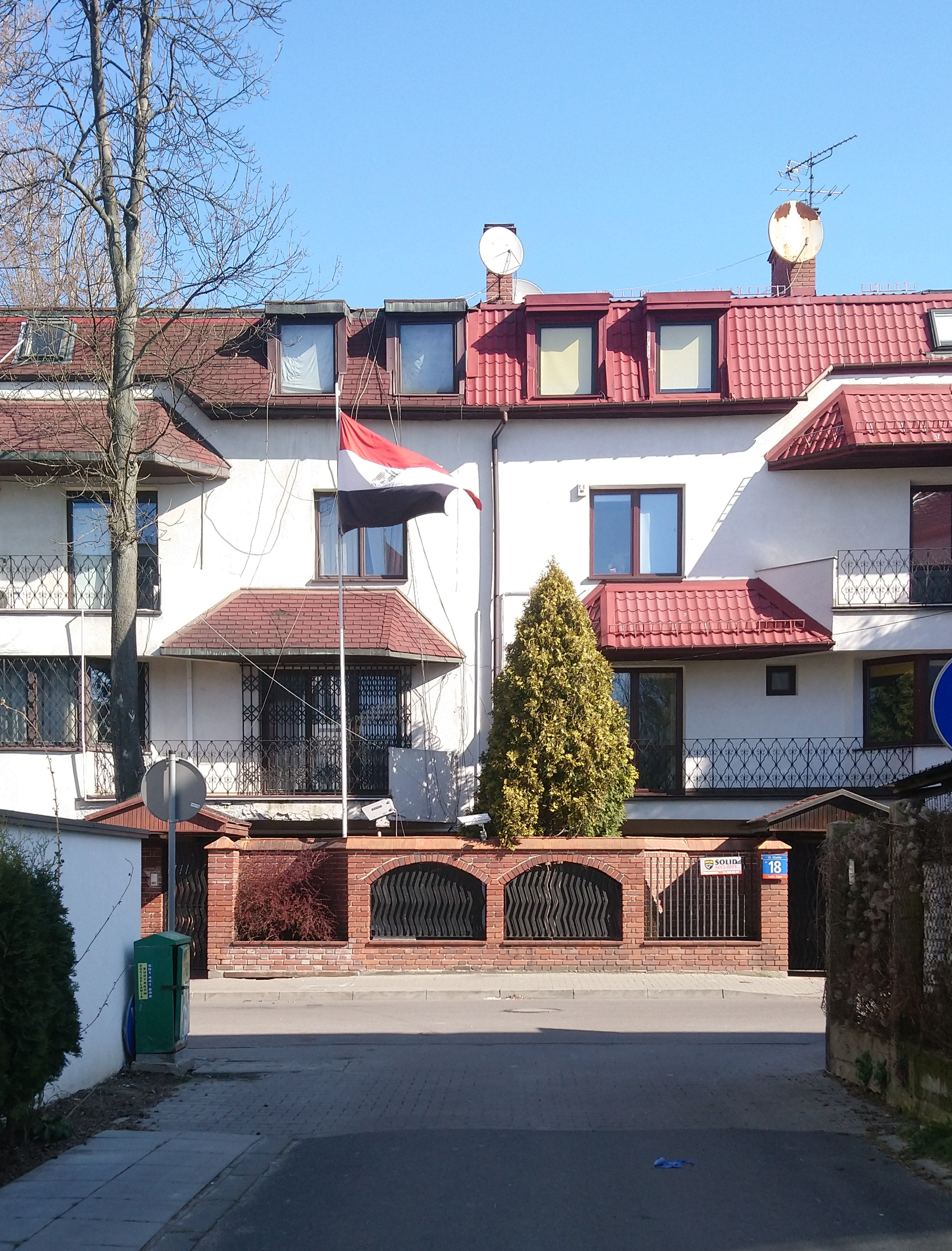
Embassy in Warsaw

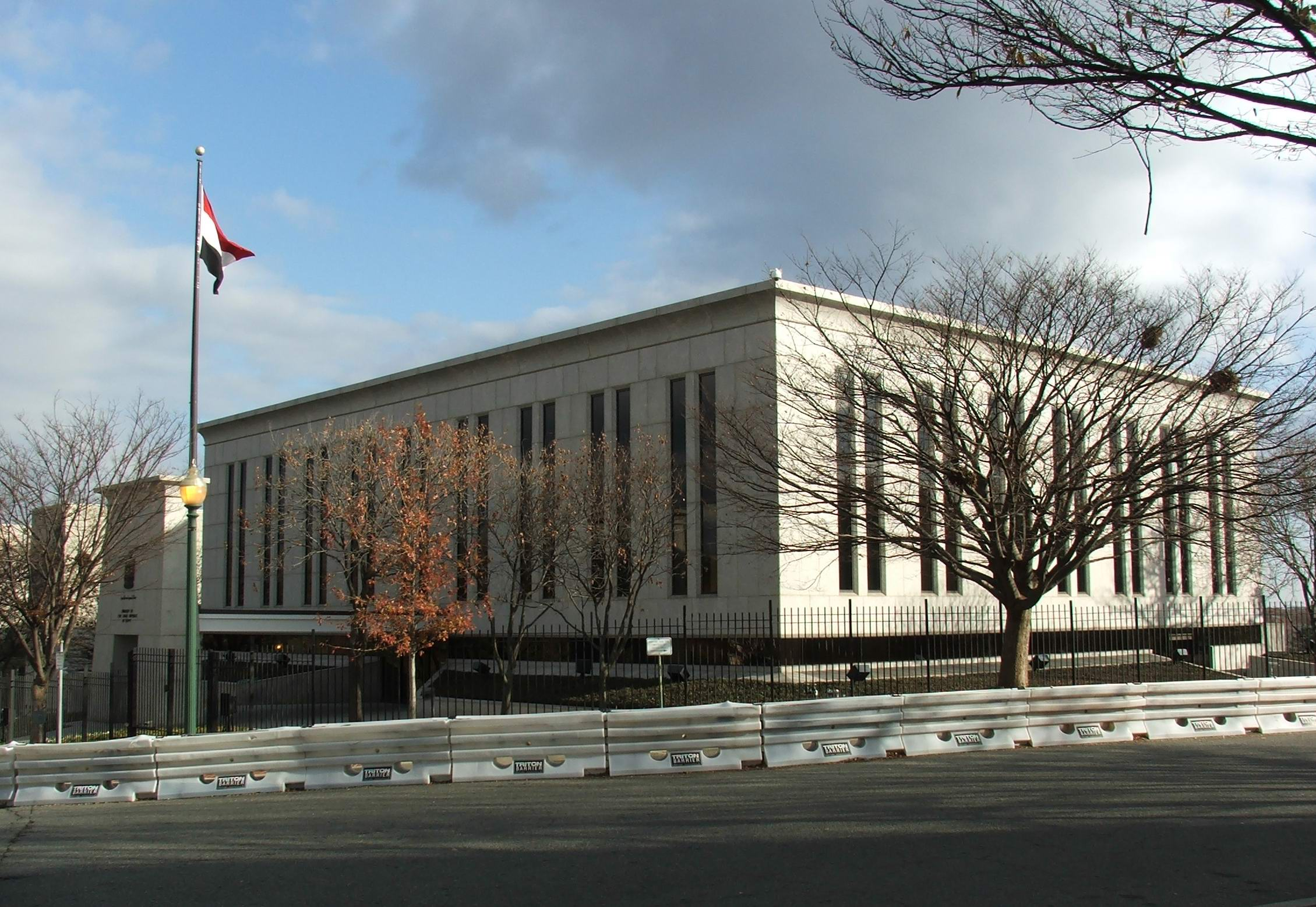
Embassy in Washington, D.C.

== Closed missions ==
=== Africa ===
Host country	Host city	Mission	Year closed	Ref.
Central African Republic	Bangui	Embassy	Unknown	
Nigeria	Lagos	Consulate-General	2015	
Tanzania	Zanzibar City	Consulate-General	Unknown	

=== Asia ===
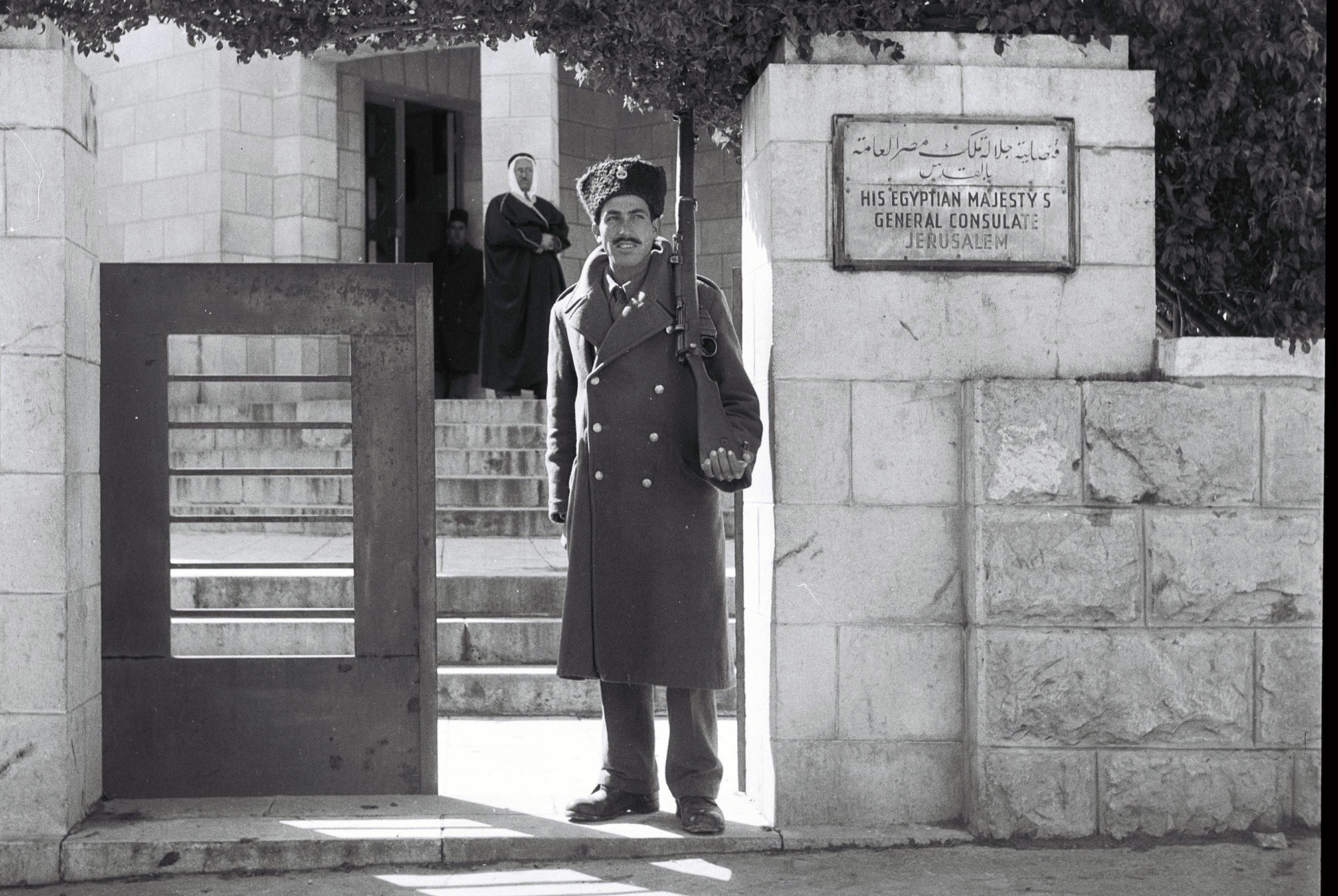
Former consulate-general of Egypt in Jerusalem

Host country	Host city	Mission	Year closed	Ref.
Mandatory Palestine	Jerusalem	Consulate-General	Unknown	
Yemen	Sana'a	Embassy (Note: Resident in Riyadh, Saudi Arabia)	2015	
Yemen	Aden	Consulate	Unknown	

== See also ==
- Foreign relations of Egypt
- List of diplomatic missions in Egypt
- Visa policy of Egypt
