= Foreign relations of Egypt =

The Foreign relations of Egypt are the Egyptian government's external relations with the outside world. Egypt's foreign policy operates along a non-aligned level. Factors such as population size, historical events, military strength, diplomatic expertise and a strategic geographical position give Egypt extensive political influence in the Africa, the Mediterranean, Southwest Asia, and within the Non-Aligned Movement as a whole. Cairo has been a crossroads of the Mediterranean's, Africa's and Asia's commerce and culture for millennia, and its intellectual and religious institutions are at the center of the region's social and cultural landmarks.

== Diplomatic relations ==
=== Israeli–Palestinian conflict ===
Egypt has been seeking to play a role in the resolution of the Israeli–Palestinian conflict.

Egypt played an important role in the negotiations leading to the Madrid Conference of 1991, which, under United States and Soviet sponsorship, brought together all parties in the region, including for the first time a Palestinian delegation, to discuss Middle East peace.

This support has continued to the present, with former President Hosni Mubarak often intervening personally to promote peace negotiations. In 1996, he hosted the Sharm El-Sheikh "Summit of the Peacemakers" attended by President Bill Clinton and other world leaders.

In 2000, he hosted two summits at Sharm El-Sheikh and one at Taba in an effort to resume the Camp David negotiations suspended in July 2000, and in June 2003, Mubarak hosted President George W. Bush for another summit on Middle East peace process. Another summit was convened in Sharm El Sheik in early 2005, which was attended by Egypt, Israel, the Palestinian Authority and Jordan. The former Egyptian Chief of Intelligence, General Omar Suleiman, played a role in negotiations between the Israeli and Palestinian sides.

=== List ===
List of countries which Egypt maintains diplomatic relations with:

| # | Country | Date |
|---|---|---|
| 1 | Romania | 1 April 1906 |
| 2 | Serbia | 1 February 1908 |
| 3 | United Kingdom | 19 December 1914 |
| 4 | Finland | 8 April 1922 |
| 5 | Greece | 15 April 1922 |
| 6 | United States | 26 April 1922 |
| 7 | Italy | 30 April 1922 |
| 8 | Spain | 9 May 1922 |
| 9 | Belgium | 10 May 1922 |
| 10 | France | 31 May 1922 |
| 11 | Denmark | 1 June 1922 |
| 12 | Czech Republic | 25 November 1922 |
| 13 | Netherlands | 16 November 1922 |
| 14 | Sweden | 25 November 1922 |
| — | Iran (suspended) | 1923 |
| 15 | Brazil | 27 February 1924 |
| 16 | Turkey | 8 May 1925 |
| 17 | Portugal | 25 June 1925 |
| 18 | Bulgaria | 5 November 1925 |
| 19 | Ethiopia | 1927 |
| 20 | Poland | 1927 |
| 21 | Afghanistan | 10 March 1928 |
| 22 | Chile | 5 July 1929 |
| 23 | Austria | 30 April 1931 |
| 24 | Uruguay | 25 February 1932 |
| 25 | Switzerland | 11 March 1935 |
| 26 | Luxembourg | 14 November 1935 |
| 27 | Norway | 25 April 1936 |
| 28 | Saudi Arabia | 7 May 1936 |
| 29 | Russia | 26 August 1943 |
| 30 | Lebanon | 30 November 1944 |
| 31 | Syria | 1944 |
| 32 | Philippines | 3 March 1946 |
| 33 | Yemen | 11 April 1946 |
| 34 | Jordan | 28 May 1947 |
| 35 | Argentina | 9 June 1947 |
| 36 | Indonesia | 10 June 1947 |
| 37 | India | 18 August 1947 |
| — | Holy See | 23 August 1947 |
| 38 | Pakistan | 20 October 1947 |
| 39 | Cuba | 5 September 1949 |
| 40 | Australia | 23 July 1950 |
| 41 | Venezuela | 16 November 1950 |
| 42 | Germany | 16 October 1952 |
| 43 | Cambodia | 30 March 1953 |
| 44 | Myanmar | 8 August 1953 |
| 45 | Libya | 3 September 1953 |
| 46 | Canada | 28 July 1954 |
| 47 | Japan | 23 August 1954 |
| 48 | Thailand | 27 September 1954 |
| 49 | Hungary | 13 October 1954 |
| 50 | Sudan | 4 January 1956 |
| 51 | Albania | 19 April 1956 |
| 52 | Morocco | 2 May 1956 |
| 53 | Tunisia | 2 May 1956 |
| 54 | China | 30 May 1956 |
| 55 | Colombia | 23 January 1957 |
| 56 | Nepal | 16 July 1957 |
| 57 | Sri Lanka | 24 October 1957 |
| 58 | Ghana | 7 November 1957 |
| 59 | Liberia | 1957 |
| 60 | Panama | 21 February 1958 |
| 61 | Mexico | 31 March 1958 |
| 62 | Iraq | 2 August 1958 |
| 63 | Malaysia | 10 November 1959 |
| 64 | Guinea | 1959 |
| 65 | Paraguay | 1959 |
| 66 | Senegal | 4 April 1960 |
| 67 | Democratic Republic of the Congo | 30 June 1960 |
| 68 | Somalia | 8 July 1960 |
| 69 | Togo | 20 September 1960 |
| 70 | Nigeria | 1 October 1960 |
| 71 | Cyprus | 25 October 1960 |
| 72 | Ecuador | 8 November 1960 |
| 73 | Bolivia | 17 November 1960 |
| 74 | Haiti | 30 November 1960 |
| 75 | Dominican Republic | 30 December 1960 |
| 76 | Cameroon | 7 January 1961 |
| 77 | Mali | 10 January 1961 |
| 78 | Sierra Leone | 27 April 1961 |
| 79 | Burkina Faso | 23 September 1961 |
| 80 | Kuwait | 2 December 1961 |
| 81 | Algeria | 8 November 1962 |
| 82 | Tanzania | 14 November 1962 |
| 83 | Mongolia | 2 April 1963 |
| 84 | Niger | 7 July 1963 |
| 85 | North Korea | 24 August 1963 |
| 86 | Vietnam | 1 September 1963 |
| 87 | Peru | 7 October 1963 |
| 88 | Kenya | 7 March 1964 |
| 89 | Trinidad and Tobago | 22 March 1964 |
| 90 | Uganda | 27 May 1964 |
| 91 | Jamaica | 10 June 1964 |
| 92 | Republic of the Congo | 28 July 1964 |
| 93 | Mauritania | 21 October 1964 |
| 94 | Malawi | 25 November 1964 |
| 95 | Burundi | 8 December 1964 |
| 96 | Benin | 15 December 1964 |
| 97 | Ivory Coast | 15 December 1964 |
| 98 | Zambia | 15 December 1964 |
| 99 | Costa Rica | 1964 |
| 100 | El Salvador | 1964 |
| 101 | Gambia | 31 May 1965 |
| 102 | Malta | 2 November 1965 |
| 103 | Singapore | 28 November 1966 |
| 104 | Iceland | 20 May 1968 |
| 105 | Maldives | 12 February 1969 |
| 106 | Equatorial Guinea | 15 April 1969 |
| 107 | Central African Republic | 2 July 1969 |
| 108 | New Zealand | 13 February 1970 |
| 109 | Madagascar | 23 February 1970 |
| 110 | Mauritius | 26 March 1970 |
| 111 | Guatemala | 7 September 1970 |
| 112 | Chad | September 1970 |
| 113 | Rwanda | 10 February 1971 |
| 114 | Guyana | 10 September 1971 |
| 115 | Qatar | 1 November 1971 |
| 116 | Oman | 20 March 1972 |
| 117 | Fiji | 5 May 1972 |
| 118 | Bahrain | 5 June 1972 |
| 119 | United Arab Emirates | 26 October 1972 |
| 120 | Botswana | 7 March 1973 |
| 121 | Gabon | 9 April 1973 |
| 122 | Lesotho | 31 May 1973 |
| 123 | Bangladesh | 15 September 1973 |
| 124 | Eswatini | 20 November 1973 |
| 125 | Guinea-Bissau | 11 June 1974 |
| 126 | Ireland | 12 December 1974 |
| 127 | Mozambique | 25 June 1975 |
| 128 | Angola | 18 February 1976 |
| 129 | São Tomé and Príncipe | March 1976 |
| 130 | Comoros | 28 June 1976 |
| 131 | Seychelles | 14 July 1976 |
| 132 | Grenada | 14 September 1976 |
| 133 | Cape Verde | 19 October 1976 |
| 134 | Laos | November 1976 |
| 135 | Suriname | 23 February 1977 |
| 136 | Djibouti | 22 July 1977 |
| 137 | Samoa | 8 September 1978 |
| 138 | Nicaragua | 11 September 1978 |
| 139 | Israel | 26 February 1980 |
| 140 | Zimbabwe | 23 April 1980 |
| — | Sovereign Military Order of Malta | 1980 |
| 141 | Brunei | 2 May 1984 |
| 142 | Honduras | 5 August 1986 |
| 143 | San Marino | 27 April 1989 |
| — | State of Palestine | October 1989 |
| 144 | Namibia | 20 May 1990 |
| 145 | Estonia | 2 January 1992 |
| 146 | Kyrgyzstan | 9 January 1992 |
| 147 | Lithuania | 22 January 1992 |
| 148 | Latvia | 23 January 1992 |
| 149 | Uzbekistan | 23 January 1992 |
| 150 | Ukraine | 25 January 1992 |
| 151 | Belarus | 1 February 1992 |
| 152 | Moldova | 13 February 1992 |
| 153 | Kazakhstan | 6 March 1992 |
| 154 | Armenia | 9 March 1992 |
| 155 | Azerbaijan | 27 March 1992 |
| 156 | Slovenia | 30 April 1992 |
| 157 | Marshall Islands | 2 May 1992 |
| 158 | Georgia | 11 May 1992 |
| 159 | Croatia | 1 October 1992 |
| 160 | Slovakia | 1 January 1993 |
| 161 | Turkmenistan | 3 February 1993 |
| 162 | Tajikistan | 1 April 1993 |
| 163 | Bosnia and Herzegovina | 17 April 1993 |
| 164 | Eritrea | 9 August 1993 |
| 165 | South Africa | 29 April 1994 |
| 166 | Belize | 6 May 1994 |
| 167 | North Macedonia | 14 November 1994 |
| 168 | South Korea | 13 April 1995 |
| 169 | Andorra | 25 February 1997 |
| 170 | Bahamas | 11 February 2005 |
| 171 | Liechtenstein | 17 October 2005 |
| 172 | Timor-Leste | 16 April 2006 |
| 173 | Montenegro | 27 September 2006 |
| 174 | Barbados | 3 November 2006 |
| 175 | Monaco | 31 May 2007 |
| 176 | Antigua and Barbuda | 7 July 2010 |
| 177 | Dominica | 7 July 2010 |
| 178 | Saint Lucia | 19 July 2010 |
| 179 | Kiribati | 25 September 2010 |
| 180 | Federated States of Micronesia | 25 September 2010 |
| 181 | Nauru | 25 September 2010 |
| 182 | Palau | 25 September 2010 |
| 183 | Saint Vincent and the Grenadines | 16 November 2010 |
| 184 | Solomon Islands | 23 December 2010 |
| 185 | Tuvalu | 23 December 2010 |
| 186 | South Sudan | 9 July 2011 |
| 187 | Vanuatu | 22 September 2011 |
| 188 | Bhutan | 14 November 2012 |
| 189 | Papua New Guinea | 24 March 2015 |
| 190 | Saint Kitts and Nevis | 21 September 2021 |
| 191 | Tonga | Unknown |

== Bilateral relations ==
=== Africa ===
In the 21st-century Egypt has encountered a major problem with immigration, as millions of Africans attempt to enter Egypt fleeing poverty and war. Border control methods can be "harsh, sometimes lethal." This has strained relations with Egypt's southern neighbors, and with Israel and the members of the EU as these immigrants attempt to move on to wealthier countries.

The dispute between Egypt and Ethiopia over the Grand Ethiopian Renaissance Dam has become a national preoccupation in both countries. Egypt sees the dam as an existential threat, fearing that the dam will reduce the amount of water it receives from the Nile. Egypt's former Foreign Minister Sameh Shoukry said: "Survival is not a question of choice, but an imperative of nature."

| Country | Formal relations established | Notes |
|---|---|---|
| Algeria | | See Algeria–Egypt relations: Algeria has an embassy in Cairo.; Egypt has an embassy in Algiers. |
| Angola | 18 February 1976 | Both countries established diplomatic relations on 18 February 1976: Angola has an embassy in Cairo.; Egypt has an embassy in Luanda. |
| Ethiopia | | See Egypt–Ethiopia relations: Egypt has an embassy in Addis Ababa.; In 2021, Ethiopia closed its embassy in Cairo due to financial reasons. In November 2022, Ethiopia reopened its embassy in Cairo. |
| Guinea-Bissau | 11 June 1974 | Both countries established diplomatic relations on 11 June 1974: Egypt is accredited to Guinea-Bissau from its embassy in Conakry, Guinea.; Guinea-Bissau is accredited to Egypt from its embassy in Algiers, Algeria.; Both countries are full member of the African Union. |
| Kenya | | See Egypt–Kenya relations: Egypt has an embassy in Nairobi.; Kenya has an embassy in Cairo. |
| Libya | 3 September 1953 | See Egypt–Libya relations Both countries established diplomatic relations on 3 September 1953 when first Libyan Minister to Egypt Ibrahim El-Senoussi present his credentials to General Naguib.: Egypt has an embassy in Tripoli and a consulate-general in Benghazi.; Libya has an embassy in Cairo and a consulate-general in Alexandria. |
| Morocco | | See Egypt–Morocco relations: Egypt has an embassy in Rabat.; Morocco has an embassy in Cairo. |
| Somalia | | See Egypt–Somalia relations: Egypt has an embassy in Mogadishu.; Somalia has an embassy in Cairo. |
| South Africa | 1942 | See Egypt–South Africa relations: The first South African mission in Egypt was established in 1942 as a consulate-general.; Egypt has an embassy in Pretoria and South Africa has an embassy in Cairo.; Both countries are full members of the African Union, G-24, Group of 77 and Non-Aligned Movement.; South African Department of Foreign Affairs about relations with Egypt |
| Sudan | 4 January 1956 | See Egypt–Sudan relations Both countries established diplomatic relations on 4 January 1956 when first ambassador of Egypt to Sudan general Mahmoud Seif El-Yazal Khalifa presented his letters of credentials.: Sudan was ruled by the Egyptian Empire since Ancient Times.; Egypt has an embassy in Khartoum and a consulate-general in Port Sudan.; Sudan has an embassy in Cairo and a consulate-general in Aswan. |
| South Sudan | 9 July 2011 | See Egypt–South Sudan relations Both countries established diplomatic relations on 9 July 2011: Egypt has an embassy in Juba.; South Sudan has an embassy in Cairo. |
| Tanzania | 14 November 1962 | Both countries established diplomatic relations on 14 November 1962 when Mr. Mustafa F. El-Essawi has been accredited as Ambassador of United Arab Republic (Egypt) to Tanganyika with residence in Dar es Salaam.: Egypt has an embassy in Dar-es-Salaam.; Tanzania has an embassy in Cairo. |

=== Americas ===
| Country | Formal relations established | Notes |
|---|---|---|
| Argentina | 9 June 1947 | See Argentina–Egypt relations Both countries established diplomatic relations on 9 June 1947: Argentina has an embassy in Cairo.; Egypt has an embassy in Buenos Aires.; List of Treaties ruling relations Argentina and Egypt (Argentine Foreign Ministry, in Spanish); Egyptian–Argentinean relations – From the Egypt State Information Service |
| Brazil | 27 February 1924 | See Brazil–Egypt relations Both countries established diplomatic relations on 27 February 1924.: Brazil has an embassy in Cairo.; Egypt has an embassy in Brasília and a consulate-general in Rio de Janeiro. |
| Canada | 28 July 1954 | See Canada–Egypt relations Both countries established diplomatic relations on 28 July 1954 Both countries established embassies in their respective capitals in 1954.: Canada has an embassy in Cairo.; Egypt has an embassy in Ottawa and a consulate-general in Montreal. |
| Chile | 1929 | Both countries established diplomatic relations in 1929: Chile has an embassy in Cairo.; Egypt has an embassy in Santiago. |
| Colombia | 23 January 1957 | See Colombia–Egypt relations Both countries established diplomatic relations on 23 January 1957: Colombia has an embassy in Cairo.; Egypt has an embassy in Bogotá. |
| Cuba | 5 September 1949 | Both countries established diplomatic relations on 5 September 1949: Cuba has an embassy in Cairo.; Egypt has an embassy in Havana. |
| Mexico | 31 March 1958 | See Egypt–Mexico relations Both countries established diplomatic relations on 31 March 1958: Egypt has an embassy in Mexico City.; Mexico has an embassy in Cairo. |
| Peru | 7 October 1963 | Both countries established diplomatic relations on 7 October 1963. Main article: Egypt–Peru relations: Egypt has an embassy in Lima.; Peru has an embassy in Cairo. |
| United States | 26 April 1922 | See Egypt–United States relations Both countries established diplomatic relations on 26 April 1922 === Post-Mubarak relations with U.S. === On 21 January 2012, the U.S. Secretary of Transportation Ray LaHood's son, Sam, was detained by the Egyptian government and not allowed to leave the country as part of a politically charged criminal investigation by the Egyptian government into the activities of non-governmental organizations (NGOs) monitoring local elections in Egypt. LaHood's son is the Egypt director of the International Republican Institute. The Egyptian government has detained twelve NGO representatives from leaving Egypt. On 5 February 2012, Egyptian authorities charged LaHood's son and 42 other individuals with "spending money from organizations that were operating in Egypt without a license." Nineteen Americans are part of the 42 charged. The U.S. government has made it clear that $1.5 billion in U.S. aid to Egypt could be withheld if the investigation is not finished quickly. Faiza Abu Naga, Egypt's Minister of International Cooperation, is seen as the person pushing the investigation forward, straining U.S. and Egypt relations. On 7 October 2020, in line with Egypt's Vision 2030, US Agency for International Development (USAID) and Egypt's Ministry of International Cooperation signed an agreement to add $22.8 million to the five-year Inclusive Economic Governance bilateral assistance agreement. The funding was intended to improve the investment environment and empower women to join the labor force.: Egypt has an embassy in Washington, DC and consulates-general in Chicago, Houston, Los Angeles and New York City.; United States has an embassy in Cairo. |

=== Asia ===
| Country | Formal Relations Began | Notes |
|---|---|---|
| Armenia | 9 March 1992 | See Armenia–Egypt relations Both countries established diplomatic relations on 9 March 1992: Egypt was one of the first countries in the Arab world which recognized the independent Armenia in 1991.; In May 1992, the first diplomatic mission of Armenia in the Arab East was inaugurated in Cairo.; Egypt has an embassy in Yerevan.; Egypt had a sizable Armenian community since the 19th century. Many ethnic Armenian Egyptians remain in Egypt to this day. |
| Azerbaijan | 27 March 1992 | Both countries established diplomatic relations on 27 March 1992.; On 26 December 1991, the Arab Republic of Egypt recognized the independence of the Republic of Azerbaijan.; Azerbaijan has an embassy in Cairo.; Egypt has an embassy in Baku. |
| Bangladesh | 15 September 1973 | See Bangladesh-Egypt relations Both countries established diplomatic relations on 15 September 1973.: Egypt has an embassy in Dhaka, Bangladesh.; Bangladesh has an embassy in Cairo, Egypt.; Egypt was one of the first Arab states to recognize Bangladesh's independence. President Anwar Al Sadat enjoyed a close rapport with Bangladesh's founder Sheikh Mujibur Rahman. In 1973, Egypt gifted 30 tanks to the Bangladesh Army. Both nations are members of the OIC and the Developing 8 Countries, and identified among the Next Eleven economies. Present-day relations are characterized by a growing trade and economic relationship. |
| China | 30 May 1956 | See China–Egypt relations Both countries established diplomatic relations on 30 May 1956: China has an embassy in Cairo and a consulate-general in Alexandria.; Egypt has an embassy in Beijing and consulates-general in Hong Kong and Shanghai. |
| Georgia | 11 May 1992 | Both countries established diplomatic relations on 11 May 1992: Egypt is accredited to Georgia from its embassy in Yerevan, Armenia.; Georgia has an embassy in Cairo.; Georgian Ministry of Foreign Affairs about the relation with Egypt; Georgian foreign minister visits Egypt |
| India | 18 August 1947 | See Egypt–India relations Both countries established diplomatic relations on 18 August 1947 Modern Egypt-India relations go back to the contacts between Saad Zaghloul and Mohandas Gandhi on the common goals of their respective movements of independence. In 1955, Egypt under Gamal Abdul Nasser and India under Jawaharlal Nehru became the founders of the Non-Aligned Movement. During the 1956 War, Nehru stood supporting Egypt to the point of threatening to withdraw his country from the Commonwealth of Nations. In 1967, following the Six-Day War, India supported Egypt and the Arabs. In 1977, New Delhi described the visit of President Anwar al-Sadat to Jerusalem as a "brave" move and considered the peace treaty between Egypt and Israel a primary step on the path of a just settlement of the Middle East problem. Major Egyptian exports to India include raw cotton, raw and manufactured fertilizers, oil and oil products, organic and non-organic chemicals, leather and iron products. Major imports into Egypt from India are cotton yarn, sesame, coffee, herbs, tobacco and lentils. The Egyptian Ministry of Petroleum is also currently negotiating the establishment of a natural gas-operated fertilizer plant with another Indian company. In 2004 the Gas Authority of India Limited, bought 15% of Egypt Nat Gas distribution and marketing company. In 2008 Egyptian investment in India was worth some 750 million dollars, according to the Egyptian ambassador. President Mubarak of Egypt visited India in 2008. During the visit he met Prime Minister Manmohan Singh. In 2023 India has invited Egyptian President Abdel Fattah El-Sisi as the chief guest of the 74th Republic Day parade. Also Representing the main branches of the Egyptian armed forces, 144 soldiers participated in the parade. |
| Indonesia | 10 June 1947 | See Egypt–Indonesia relations Both countries established diplomatic relations on 10 June 1947.: Indonesia has an embassy in Cairo and Egypt has an embassy in Jakarta.; Egypt was one of the first countries to recognize Indonesia's independence.; Gamel Abdel Nasser of Egypt and Sukarno of Indonesia were two of the five founding members of the Non-aligned Movement.; Both countries are members of the OIC, the Non-aligned Movement, and the G20 developing nations. |
| Iran | 1939 (Diplomatic relations severed 1980) | See Egypt–Iran relations In 1939, diplomatic relations between Egypt and Iran were upgraded to ambassadorial level, and Youssef Zulficar Pasha was appointed as Egypt's first ambassador in Tehran. In the same year, Princess Fawzia of Egypt, the sister of King Farouk I, married Mohammad Reza Pahlavi, the then crown prince (later shah) of Iran. However, since the 1979 Islamic Revolution, Egypt's relations with Iran have been mostly strained. Egypt is the only Arab country not to have an embassy in Iran. Contentious issues include Egypt's signing of the Camp David Accords with Israel in 1979, its support for Iraq in Iran's eight-year conflict, the Islamic Republic's hailing of Khalid Islambouli, the late President Anwar Sadat's assassin as a religious hero, seeing as there was both a street and mural named after him (however, the honorer was changed to Muhammad al-Durrah, the 12-year-old Palestinian boy shot and killed during the outset of the Second Intifada), and close Egyptian relations with the United States, and most of the Western European countries. In 2007, relations between the two have thawed in the fields of diplomacy and economic trade, only to collapse during the Gaza War (2008–09) when the Iranian and Egyptian politicians exchanged blames over inaction towards the escalation. Despite wavering tensions between Tehran and Cairo, the two countries are members of the OIC and the Developing 8 In 2010, leaked diplomatic cables revealed that Mubarak expressed animosity toward Iran in private meetings, saying the Iranian leaders are "big, fat liars", and that Iran's backing of terrorism is "well-known". According to one American report, Mubarak views Iran as the primary long-term challenge facing Egypt, and an Egyptian official said that Iran is running agents inside Egypt in an effort to subvert the Egyptian regime. he also stated that if Iran will reach a nuclear weapons, Egypt will also consider reaching such weapons. |
| Iraq | | See Egypt-Iraq relations Since 1983, Iraq has repeatedly called for restoration of Egypt's "natural role" among Arab countries. In January 1984, Iraq successfully led Arab efforts within the OIC to restore Egypt's membership. However, Iraqi-Egyptian relations were broken in 1990 after Egypt joined the UN coalition that forced Iraq out of Kuwait. Relations have steadily improved in recent years, and Egypt is now one of Iraq's main trade partners (formerly under the Oil-for-Food Programme). |
| Israel | 26 January 1980 | See Egypt–Israel relations The state of war between both countries which dated back from the 1948 Arab–Israeli War ended in 1973 with the Egypt–Israel peace treaty a year after the Camp David Accords. Since then, relations have improved. Being a pioneer of peace making in the region and driven from its belief that a peaceful Middle East is the best solution for the development of Egypt, the third Egyptian president Anwar Sadat's groundbreaking trip to Jerusalem in 1977, the 1978 Camp David Accords, and the 1979 Egypt–Israel peace treaty represented a fundamental shift in the politics of the region; from a strategy of confrontation to one of peace as a strategic choice. Egypt was subsequently ostracized by other Arab states and ejected from the Arab League from 1979 to 1989. However, due to circumstances of today's Israeli–Palestinian conflict, full normalization of relations between these two countries is still halted and sometimes fought against in both countries. The Egyptian ambassador to Tel Aviv is often withdrawn, and the peace has been called a cool peace due to the Israeli–Palestinian conflict.: Egypt has an embassy in Tel Aviv and a consulate-general in Eilat.; Israel has an embassy in Cairo and a consulate-general in Alexandria. |
| Japan | 1922 | See Egypt-Japan relations Egypt-Japan relations are described by the Egyptian ambassador to Japan as a "very strong friendship", with embassies mutually established. At present, the two nations maintain a cordial relationship with strong economic and trade relations.: Egypt has an embassy in Tokyo.; Japan has an embassy in Cairo. |
| Jordan | 28 May 1947 | See Egypt-Jordan relations Both countries established diplomatic relations on 28 May 1947 when Mohamed Bey Yassin, Egyptian Minister in Transjordan with residence in Baghdad presented his credentials. On 6 April 1972, the Egyptian government severed relations in protest for a Jordanian plan for federation with the West Bank, which didn't take PLO interests unto consideration. These relations were restored on 11 September 1973. They were severed again in 1979, this time by the Jordanian government, in protest of the Egypt–Israel peace treaty. Following the outbreak of the Lebanon War of 1982, the US government put pressure on both governments to reach accommodation for the purpose of formulating a joint peace strategy vis-a-vis the Israeli government, and relations were restored on 25 September 1984.: Egypt has an embassy in Amman.; Jordan has an embassy in Cairo. |
| Kazakhstan | 6 March 1992 | Both countries established diplomatic relations on 6 March 1992.: Egypt has an embassy in Almaty, Kazakhstan.; Kazakhstan has an embassy in Cairo, Egypt.; In 2006, President Mubarak of Egypt visited Kazakhstan on the third leg of a three-country tour. During the visit he met with Kazakh President Nazarbayev. Mubarak stated that 30 trade and economic cooperation agreements had been concluded between the two countries. |
| Malaysia | 1957 | See Egypt–Malaysia relations: Egypt has an embassy in Kuala Lumpur and Malaysia has an embassy in Cairo.; Gamel Abdel Nasser gave a headquarters for the Malay Association in Egypt as a gift to Malaysia in 1959.; Both countries are members of the OIC and the Non-Aligned Movement. |
| Mongolia | 2 April 1963 | See Egypt–Mongolia relations Both countries established diplomatic relations on 2 April 1963 Cairo currently hosts Mongolia's only embassy on the African continent. |
| Pakistan | 20 October 1947 | See Egypt–Pakistan relations Both countries established diplomatic relations on 20 October 1947 when the Egyptian Government has agreed to the establishment of a Pakistan Embassy in Cairo and to the appointment Mr. J. A. Rahim as Chargé d'Affaires. Pakistan and Egypt have diplomatic and trade relations. Both countries are members of the OIC (Organisation of Islamic Cooperation), "the Next Eleven" and the "D8". Relations between the two countries were established after Pakistan was established. Pakistan President General Muhammad Ayub Khan, visited Egypt in 1959 and Egyptian President Gamal Abdul Nasser visited Pakistan in 1960.: Egypt has an embassy in Islamabad.; Pakistan has an embassy in Cairo. |
| Palestine | | See Egypt–Palestine relations: Egypt has representative offices in Ramallah and in Gaza City.; Palestine has an embassy in Cairo. |
| Philippines | 1955-01-18 | See Egypt–Philippines relations: Egypt has an embassy in Manila.; Philippines has an embassy in Cairo. |
| Qatar | 1 November 1971 | See Egypt-Qatar relations Both countries established diplomatic relations on 1 November 1971 Lately, relations have not been at its best. Sheikh Tamim bin Hamad Al Thani, Emir of the State of Qatar, has described the 2013 political transition in Egypt as a "military coup". It is worth mentioning that the main problem between the two governments is the Qatari support to the Muslim Brotherhood in Egypt. The Egyptian government, along with those of Saudi Arabia, Bahrain, and the United Arab Emirates, broke off diplomatic relations with Qatar on 5 June 2017. The Egyptian Foreign Ministry announced it was closing its air and sea ports to Qatari transportation. The Egyptian, Saudi, Bahraini, and Emirati governments cited Qatar's continuing support for "terrorism", such as the Muslim Brotherhood. Islam Hassan argues "Egypt has had troubled relations with Qatar for many years, except of Mohamed Morsi's period in power. The Egyptian government has seen Qatar as a source of instability. TheEgyptian regime also sees that Qatar challenges its rule by financing the Muslim Brotherhood, and other organizations, which the regime has outlawed and consider terrorist organizations. Thus, the Egyptian regime has been trying to push back on Qatar by any means. The current issue between the Saudi bloc and Qatar seemed to be an opportunity to put pressure on Qatar to stop financing the Muslim Brotherhood, its affiliates, and supporters, and to support the Sisi regime." |
| Saudi Arabia | 7 May 1936 | See Egypt–Saudi Arabia relations Both countries established diplomatic relations on 7 May 1936 when was signed a Treaty by Egypt and Saudi Arabia in Cairo which included Egypt's recognition of Saudi Arabia as an independent and sovereign state.: Egypt has an embassy in Riyadh and a consulate-general in Jeddah.; Saudi Arabia has an embassy in Cairo and a consulate-general in Alexandria. |
| South Korea | 13 April 1995 | See Egypt–South Korea relations: Both countries established diplomatic relations on 13 April 1995.; Egypt has an embassy in Seoul, South Korea.; South Korea has an embassy in Cairo.; Bilateral Trade 2011: Exports: 18.1 billion US dollars; Imports: 802 million US dollars; The number of South Koreans living in Egypt in 2011 was about 905.; South Korean Ministry of Foreign Affairs and Trade about relations with Egypt; Foreign relations of South Korea#Europe. |
| Turkey | 8 May 1925 | See also Egypt–Turkey relations Both countries established diplomatic relations on 8 May 1925.: Egypt has an embassy in Ankara and a Consulate General in Istanbul.; Turkey has an embassy in Cairo and a Consulate General in Alexandria.; Trade volume between the two countries was US$5.25 billion in 2018 (Egyptian exports/imports: 2.19/3.06 billion USD).; 100,971 Egyptian tourists visited Turkey in 2017.; Yunus Emre Institute has a local headquarters in Cairo since 2010.; Egypt was part of the Ottoman Empire from 1517 until leaving in 1805.; There is a free trade agreement in force between the two countries. |
| United Arab Emirates | 10 January 1972 | See Egypt-United Arab Emirates relations Both countries established diplomatic relations on 10 January 1972.: Egypt has an embassy in Abu Dhabi and a consulate-general in Dubai.; United Arab Emirates has an embassy in Cairo. |

=== Europe ===
Some time after the starting of the Arab Spring, in March 2011 the European Union adopted the joint declaration ' A partnership for democracy and shared prosperity with the Southern Mediterranean', aimed at making a number of initiatives in the field of civic society support, financial assistance and further access to the EU market dependent upon advancement in the democratization process.

As far as Egypt was concerned this declaration envisioned the further deepening of the previous Free Trade Agreement stipulated in 2004, geared towards the inclusion of areas such as trade in services, government procurement, competition, intellectual property rights, and investment protection. To the 2011 declaration, a preliminary phase of the negotiations followed in June 2013, when the EU and Egypt began an exploratory dialogue on how to deepen trade and investment relations, in particular through the possible negotiation of a Deep and Comprehensive Free Trade Agreement (DCFTA).

In August 2014, the European Union discussed the possibility of revising provision of aid to Egypt. However, divisions over the appropriate stance to adopt among European diplomats persisted, coupled by the fear that the vacuum might be soon filled by other actors, following a Saudi Foreign Minister's declaration that the Kingdom was ready to step in and those of Prime Minister Hazem al Beblawi about the possibility to appeal to Russia for foreign aid. Therefore, the only measure upon which the Foreign Ministers agreed was to suspend the sale of arms and materials that could be used for repression, but fell short to halt aid program which could damage civil society.

Earlier in July 2013, EU High Representative Catherine Ashton had visited Egypt in an attempt to promote reconciliation among the parties involved. She is credited for being the only foreign diplomat to get access to deposed president Mohamed Morsi. In an official statement released at the end of a following visit held in April 2014, the Representative raised the issue of the death penalties and incarceration of journalists and activists. At the same time, her later declarations about el-Sisi's bid for presidential candidacy as "difficult" but "brave" sparked harsh criticism among supporters of the Muslim Brotherhood, who claimed the Representative, who advanced logistical reasons, did not make any efforts to get in touch with them and members of their Anti-Coup Alliance.

In April 2014, the European Union agreed to conduct electoral monitoring, for the first time, in occasion of the Presidential elections scheduled for 26/27 May 2014. Other organizations declined to join, as in their opinion this would legitimize what they called an unlawful take on power.

A contract for the sale of 30 Rafale fighter jets was signed between the defense ministries of Egypt and France in May 2021. The official value of the contract was not disclosed at first and was later exposed to be worth 3.75 billion euro or $4.5 billion, by an investigative website called Disclose. In December 2020, French President Emmanuel Macron received criticism for not controlling the sale of weapons to Egypt on its poor human rights record, stating counter-terrorism concerns. The Egyptian defense ministry cited that the deal would be supported via a 10-year loan without disclosing its value or any further details. Rights organizations have denounced the deal and accused the French president of overlooking the increasing violation of freedom in Egypt under the regime of President Abdel Fattah Al-Sisi. France's armed forces, finance, and foreign ministries were unavailable for comment. However, French officials claim that Paris, under one of its policies, is avoiding criticism of countries on their human rights records to work with them effectively in private.

On 3 February 2022, around 175 Members of European Parliament wrote a joint letter to foreign ministers and ambassadors to the UN Human Rights Council and requested them to secure the establishment of a UN human rights monitoring and reporting mechanism on Egypt. The MEPs were concerned that despite devastating human rights crisis in Egypt, the international communities persistently failed to take any meaningful action to address the situation. The Egyptian authorities, under President Abdel Fattah Al-Sisi, have "brutally and systematically" repressed all forms of dissent and severely curtailed civic space.

| Country | Formal relations established | Notes |
|---|---|---|
| Albania | 19 April 1956 | See Albania–Egypt relations Both countries established diplomatic relations on 19 April 1956: Egypt has an embassy in Tirana.; Albania has an embassy in Cairo. |
| Bulgaria | 5 November 1925 | See Bulgaria–Egypt relations Both countries established diplomatic relations on 5 November 1925: Bulgaria has an embassy in Cairo.; Egypt has an embassy in Sofia. |
| Croatia | 1 October 1992 | See Croatia–Egypt relations Both countries established diplomatic relations on 1 October 1992: Croatia has an embassy in Cairo.; Egypt has an embassy in Zagreb. |
| Cyprus | | See Cyprus–Egypt relations Diplomatic relations between both countries were established soon after Cyprus gained its independence in 1960.: Cyprus has an embassy in Cairo.; Egypt has an embassy in Nicosia.; During an April 2009 meeting at ministerial level, the countries explored ways to develop closer ties, with plans for increased collaboration both on tourism and energy related activities. There has been talk of Cyprus increasing her imports of natural gas, Egypt using Cyprus as a bridge for exports to Europe and on prospects for the training of Cypriot engineers by their Egyptian counterparts on techniques for the extraction of oil and natural gas. |
| Denmark | 1 June 1922 | See Denmark–Egypt relations Both countries established diplomatic relations on 1 June 1922 when has been accredited Envoy Extraordinary and Minister Plenipotentiary of Denmark to Egypt Mr. G. H. Ryan de Treschow.: Denmark has an embassy in Cairo and an honorary consulate in Alexandria.; Egypt has an embassy in Copenhagen.; Both countries are full members of the Union for the Mediterranean. |
| Finland | 15 February 1947 | Finland recognised Egypt on 8 April 1922.; Egypt broke off diplomatic relations on 5 January 1942, but diplomatic relations were re-established on 15 February 1947.; Egypt has an embassy in Helsinki.; Finland has an embassy in Cairo (since 1 July 1959) and an honorary consulate general in Alexandria.; Ministry for Foreign Affairs of Finland about Egypt |
| France | 31 May 1922 | See Egypt–France relations Both countries established diplomatic relations on 31 May 1922 when has been accredited Envoy Extraordinary and Minister Plenipotentiary of France to Egypt Henri Gaillard and open Legation (Embassy) of France in Egypt.: Egypt has an embassy in Paris and a consulate-general in Marseille.; France has an embassy in Cairo and a consulate-general in Alexandria. |
| Germany | 1957-12 | See Egypt–Germany relations: Egypt has an embassy in Berlin, as well as consulates in Frankfurt and Hamburg.; Germany has an embassy in Cairo. |
| Greece | August 1833 | See Egypt-Greece relations Both countries share relations since the years BC Ancient Egypt and Ancient Greece Since the creation of Alexandria by Alexander the Great, Egypt has had a sizable Greek community, mostly centered around Alexandria, which is today Egypt's second largest city and also the seat of the Greek Orthodox Patriarchate of Alexandria. In the modern era, both countries enjoy very good and warm diplomatic relations since 1833 and especially after the Greek War Independence, and both countries have signed several defense cooperation agreements, with the heads of states visiting each other in a regular basis.: Egypt has an embassy in Athens.; Greece has an embassy in Cairo and a consulate-general in Alexandria.; Sizable communities of Greeks live in Egypt (Alexandria) and Egyptians in Greece (Patras, Athens).; Greece and Egypt signed bilateral agreements for trade, tourism and defense cooperations.; Both countries are members of the Union for the Mediterranean.; Greek Ministry of Foreign Affairs about relations with Egypt; Egyptian Ministry of Foreign Affairs about relations with Greece |
| Ireland | 12 December 1974 | Both countries established diplomatic relations on 12 December 1974.: Since 1978, Egypt has an embassy in Dublin, the first embassy of an Arab country in Ireland.; Ireland has an embassy in Cairo and an honorary consulate in Alexandria. |
| Italy | 30 April 1922 | See Egypt–Italy relations Both countries established diplomatic relations on 30 April 1922 when has been appointed first Envoy Extraordinary and Minister Plenipotentiary of Italy to Egypt Mr Lazzaro Negrotto Cambiaso. Relations were established during the period of the Roman Empire and Ancient Egypt. However, during World War II, relations were strained as the Italian and German Troops launched a campaign on Egypt but were defeated by Egyptian and British Forces in the battle of El Alamein. However, after the war, relations were re-established and are close.: Egypt has an embassy in Rome and a consulate-general in Milan.; Italy has an embassy in Cairo.; Both nations are members of the Union for the Mediterranean.; See also Italian Egyptian |
| Kosovo | | See Egypt–Kosovo relations Egypt recognised the Republic of Kosovo as an independent state on 26 June 2013.: Kosovo has a liaison office in Cairo. |
| Malta | 2 November 1965 | Both countries established diplomatic relations on 2 November 1965: Malta has an embassy in Cairo and 2 honorary consulates in Alexandria and Suez.; Egypt has an embassy in Valletta and Ta' Xbiex. |
| Netherlands | 16 November 1922 | Both countries established diplomatic relations on 16 November 1922 when Mr. J. P. graaf van Limburg Stirum has been accredited as Envoy Extraordinary and Minister Plenipotentiary of the Netherlands to Egypt.: Egypt has an embassy in The Hague.; The Netherlands has an embassy in Cairo. |
| North Macedonia | 14 November 1994 | Both countries established diplomatic relations on 14 November 1994: Egypt is accredited to North Macedonia from its embassy in Sofia, Bulgaria.; North Macedonia has an embassy in Cairo. |
| Poland | 1927 | See Egypt–Poland relations Both countries established diplomatic relations in 1927.: Egypt has an embassy in Warsaw.; Poland has an embassy in Cairo. |
| Romania | 3 April 1926 | Both countries established diplomatic relations on 3 April 1926 when the diplomatic representations from Romania and Egypt were raised to the level of Legation.: Egypt has an embassy in Bucharest.; Romania has an embassy in Cairo. |
| Russia | 26 August 1943 | See Egypt–Russia relations Both countries established diplomatic relations on 26 August 1943: Egypt has an embassy in Moscow.; Russia has an embassy in Cairo and a consulate-general in Alexandria. |
| Serbia | | See Egypt-Serbia relations: Egypt has an embassy in Belgrade.; Serbia has an embassy in Cairo.; Serbian Ministry of Foreign Affairs about relations with Egypt |
| Slovenia | 30 April 1992 | See Egypt–Slovenia relations Both countries established diplomatic relations on 30 April 1992: Since September 2007, Egypt has an embassy in Ljubljana.; Slovenia has an embassy in Cairo (opened in 1993).; Both countries are members of the Union for the Mediterranean. |
| Spain | 9 May 1922 | See Egypt–Spain relations Both countries established diplomatic relations on 9 May 1922 when has been accredited Envoy Extraordinary and Minister Plenipotentiary of Spain to Egypt Mr. Silvio F. Vallin.: Egypt has an embassy in Madrid.; Spain has an embassy in Cairo. |
| Switzerland | 11 March 1935 | See Egypt-Switzerland relations Both countries established diplomatic relations on 11 March 1935 when Mr. Henri Martin, first Minister of Switzerland to Egypt, presented his letters of credentials.: Official diplomatic relation between both countries date back from 1909, with the opening of a Swiss trade mission in Egypt.; Egypt has an embassy in Bern and a general consulate in Geneva.; Switzerland has an embassy in Cairo.; Swiss Federal Department of Foreign Affairs about relations with Egypt |
| Ukraine | 25 January 1992 | See Egypt–Ukraine relations Both countries established diplomatic relations on 25 January 1992: Since 1993, Egypt has an embassy in Kyiv.; Since 1993, Ukraine has an embassy in Cairo and an honorary consulate in Alexandria. |
| United Kingdom | 1914 | See Egypt–United Kingdom relations British Prime Minister Rishi Sunak with Egyptian President Abdel Fattah el-Sisi at COP27 in Sharm El Sheikh, October 2023. Egypt established diplomatic relations with the United Kingdom on 19 December 1914.: Egypt maintains an embassy in London.; The United Kingdom is accredited to Egypt through its embassy in Cairo.; The UK governed Egypt from 1882 to 1956, when it achieved full independence. Both countries share common membership of the United Nations, the World Health Organization, and the World Trade Organization. Bilaterally the two countries have an Association Agreement, a Development Partnership, and a Double Taxation Convention. |

=== Oceania ===
| Country | Formal Relations Began | Notes |
|---|---|---|
| Australia | 1950 | See Australia–Egypt relations: Australia has an embassy in Cairo.; Egypt has an embassy in Canberra and 2 Consulates-General (in Melbourne and Sydney).; Australian Department of Foreign Affairs and Trade about relations with Egypt |
| New Zealand | 1974 | See Egypt–New Zealand relations: Egypt has an embassy in Wellington.; New Zealand has an embassy in Cairo. |

== See also ==
- List of Foreign ministers of Egypt
- Iran-Arab Relations (Egypt)
- List of Ambassadors from Egypt
- List of diplomatic missions in Egypt
- List of diplomatic missions of Egypt
- Ministry of Foreign Affairs
- Visa requirements for Egyptian citizens
