= Colombia–Egypt relations =

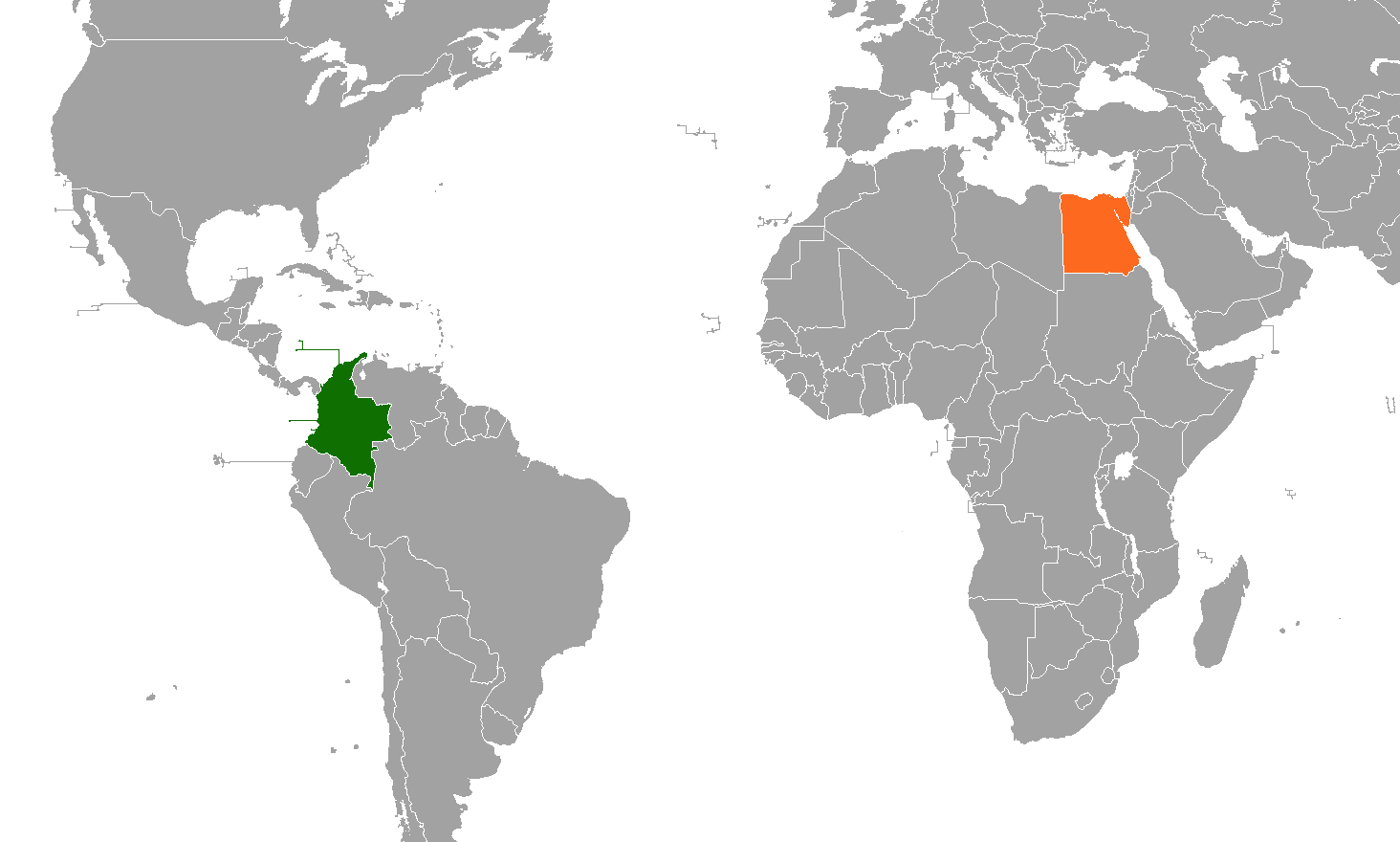
- Colombia: Egypt

Diplomatic mission
- Embassy of Colombia in Cairo: Embassy of Egypt in Bogotá

Colombia–Egypt relations are the diplomatic relations between the Republic of Colombia and the Arab Republic of Egypt. Both governments have maintained a friendly relationship since the 20th century.

== History ==
Both governments established diplomatic relations on 23 January 1957 during the government of Gustavo Rojas Pinilla in Colombia and that of Gamal Abdel Nasser in Egypt. On 23 June 1981, the Basic Agreement on Technical and Scientific Cooperation and the Trade Agreement were signed.

== Economic relations ==
Both countries have a trade agreement. Colombia exported to Egypt the equivalent of 7.682 billion dollars, the main exports being those related to the agricultural sector, coffee and machinery; while Egypt exported to Colombia the equivalent of 11.714 billion dollars, the main products being those related to the clothing sector, textiles and those related to light industry.

== Bilateral agreements ==
The two countries have signed a few bilateral agreements such as a Cultural Agreement (1960); Basic Technical and Scientific Cooperation Agreement (1981); Commercial Agreement (1981) and a Memorandum of Understanding between the Ministry of Foreign Affairs.

== Diplomatic representation ==
- Colombia has an embassy in Cairo.
- Egypt has an embassy in Bogotá.

== See also ==
- Foreign relations of Colombia
- Foreign relations of Egypt
