= Egypt–Poland relations =

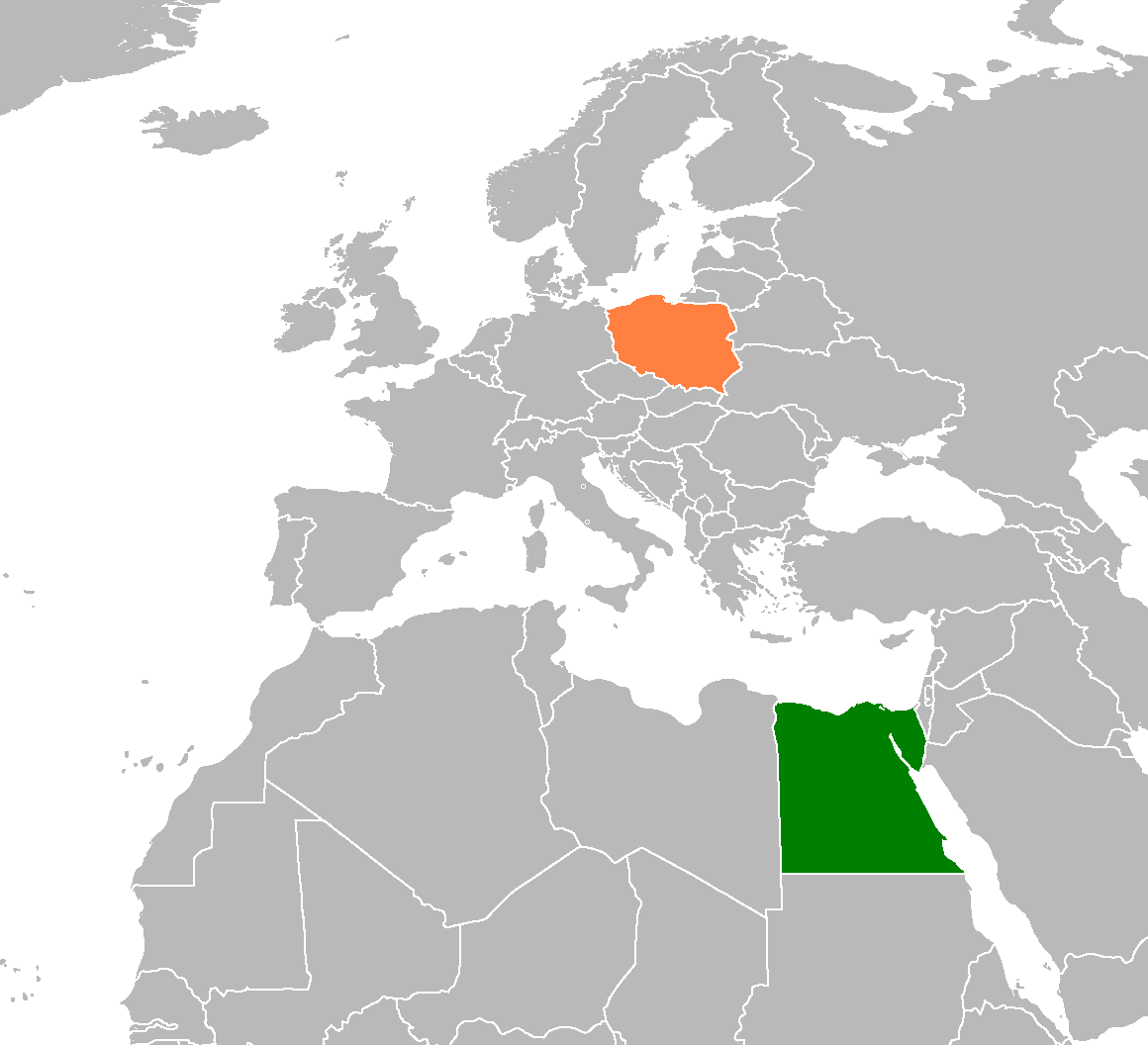
- Egypt: Poland

Egypt–Poland relations refers to the relationship between Egypt and Poland. Egypt has an embassy in Warsaw whilst Poland has an embassy in Cairo. Both countries are members of the Union for the Mediterranean, World Trade Organization and the United Nations.

== History ==
=== 20th century ===
The Embassy of Poland in Cairo was opened in 1927, and an honorary consulate in Alexandria was founded in 1933.

On 4 September 1939, Egypt broke off diplomatic relations with Germany in response to the German invasion of Poland, which started World War II.

The mufti of Poland, Jakub Szynkiewicz, one of Poland's famous Muslims, had settled in Egypt when Poland fell to the communists in 1946, until 1952 coup when he left to emigrate to the United States.

On May 18, 1948, during the 1948 Arab–Israeli War, Egyptian aircraft bombed a Polish ship in Tel Aviv. The Polish ambassador to Egypt launched a complaint in response.

In 1956, Poland supported Egyptian nationalization of the Suez Canal. Afterwards Egypt invited 12 Polish shipping pilots to work at the canal after British specialists left. In 1956, a Polish Ocean Lines agency was established in Port Said, and 17 Poles were employed in the Egyptian fleet. Poland conducted professional courses for Egyptian Navy officers in Gdynia. After a scientific and technical cooperation treaty was signed between Egypt and Poland in 1965, Polish specialists migrated to Egypt, and Egyptian students to Poland. Poles either built or expanded multiple industrial factories in Egypt in the 1960s and 1970s.

In the 1970s, a Polish contingent participated in the UNEF II peacekeeping mission in Egypt.

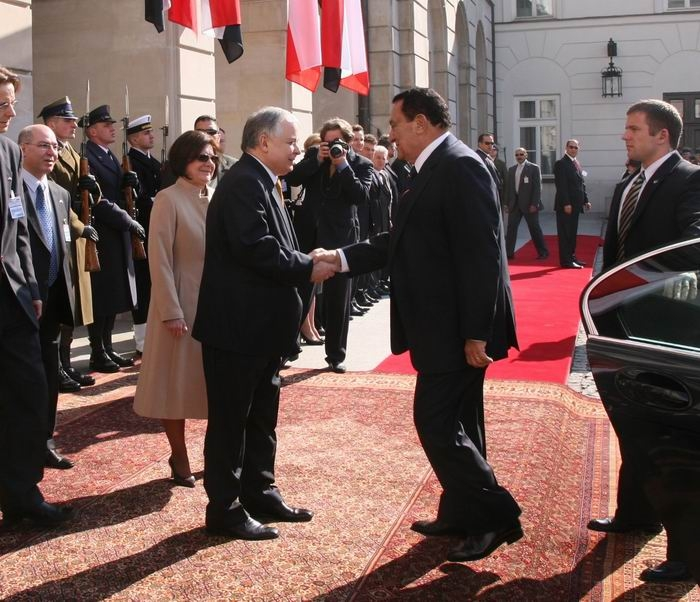
Presidents Lech Kaczyński and Hosni Mubarak in Warsaw in 2008

=== Recent history ===
In September 2021, Poland donated over 100,000 COVID-19 vaccines to Egypt.

== Resident diplomatic missions ==
- Egypt has an embassy in Warsaw.
- Poland has an embassy in Cairo.

== See also ==
- Foreign relations of Egypt
- Foreign relations of Poland

== Bibliography ==
- Knopek, Jacek (2006). "Stosunki Polski z Afryką Arabską po II wojnie światowej". Forum Politologiczne (in Polish). 3. Instytut Nauk Politycznych Uniwersytetu Warmińsko-Mazurskiego w Olsztynie. ISSN 1734-1698.
