= Egypt–Indonesia relations =

- Egypt: Indonesia

Egypt–Indonesia relations refer to foreign relations between Egypt and Indonesia since 1947. Both are Muslim-majority countries with significant non-Muslim minorities. Both nations are members of the Organisation of Islamic Cooperation, Non-Aligned Movement, BRICS, the G20 developing nations and Developing 8 Countries.

== History ==
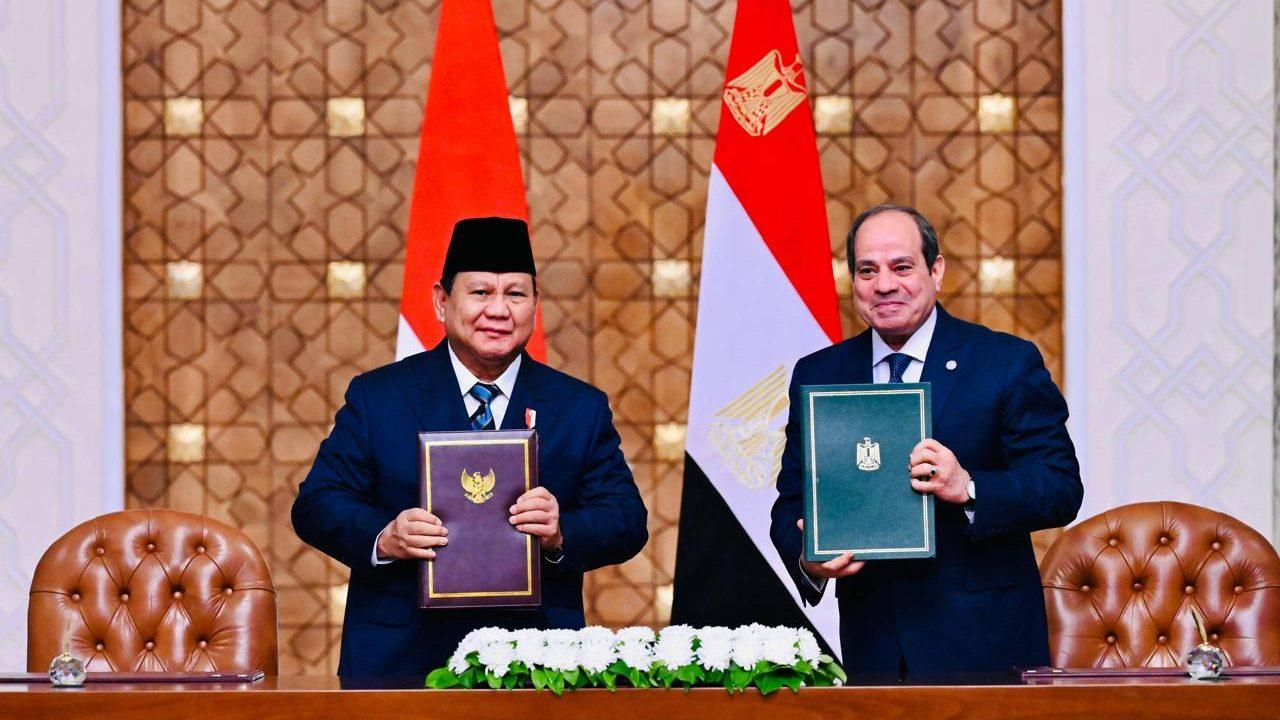
Presidents Prabowo Subianto and Abdel Fattah el-Sisi singing the joint declaration of Strategic Partnership.

Egypt was the first sovereign country to recognise Indonesia's independence; doing so on 22 March 1946, three years before its formal, internationally-recognized independence date. On 10 June 1947, Egypt de jure recognized Indonesia under Prime Minister Mahmoud El Nokrashy Pasha. This marked the beginning of bilateral relations between the two nations.

In 2020, the value of trade between the two countries reached US$1.5 billion. Indonesian exports to Egypt include crude palm oil, coffee, tea, textiles and electronic devices among other things. In 2014, Indonesia's exports' rate rose by 21.71 percent to a value of $1.34 billion. Egypt's exports to Indonesia, on the other hand, have reached $94.4 million in 2013 and included minerals, cement and fruits among others.

On 17 December 2024, Indonesian President Prabowo Subianto began a working trip to Egypt. He attended the D-8 Summit and held a bilateral meeting with Egyptian President Abdel Fattah el-Sisi. He also gave a public lecture at Al-Azhar University in the face of Indonesian students.

On 12 April 2025, Prabowo and El-Sisi held bilateral talks sought to strengthen bilateral ties and increase collaboration in a number of key areas. Following discussions, a joint declaration was signed, thus elevating Egypt-Indonesia relations to the status of a strategic partnership. Both countries' common goals for increased cooperation in manufacturing, trade, investment, information and communication technology, and food and energy security are reflected in the pact.

== Diplomatic missions ==
- Egypt has an embassy in Jakarta.
- Indonesia has an embassy in Cairo.

== See also ==
- Foreign relations of Egypt
- Foreign relations of Indonesia
- Egypt and the Non-Aligned Movement
