= Egypt–Switzerland relations =

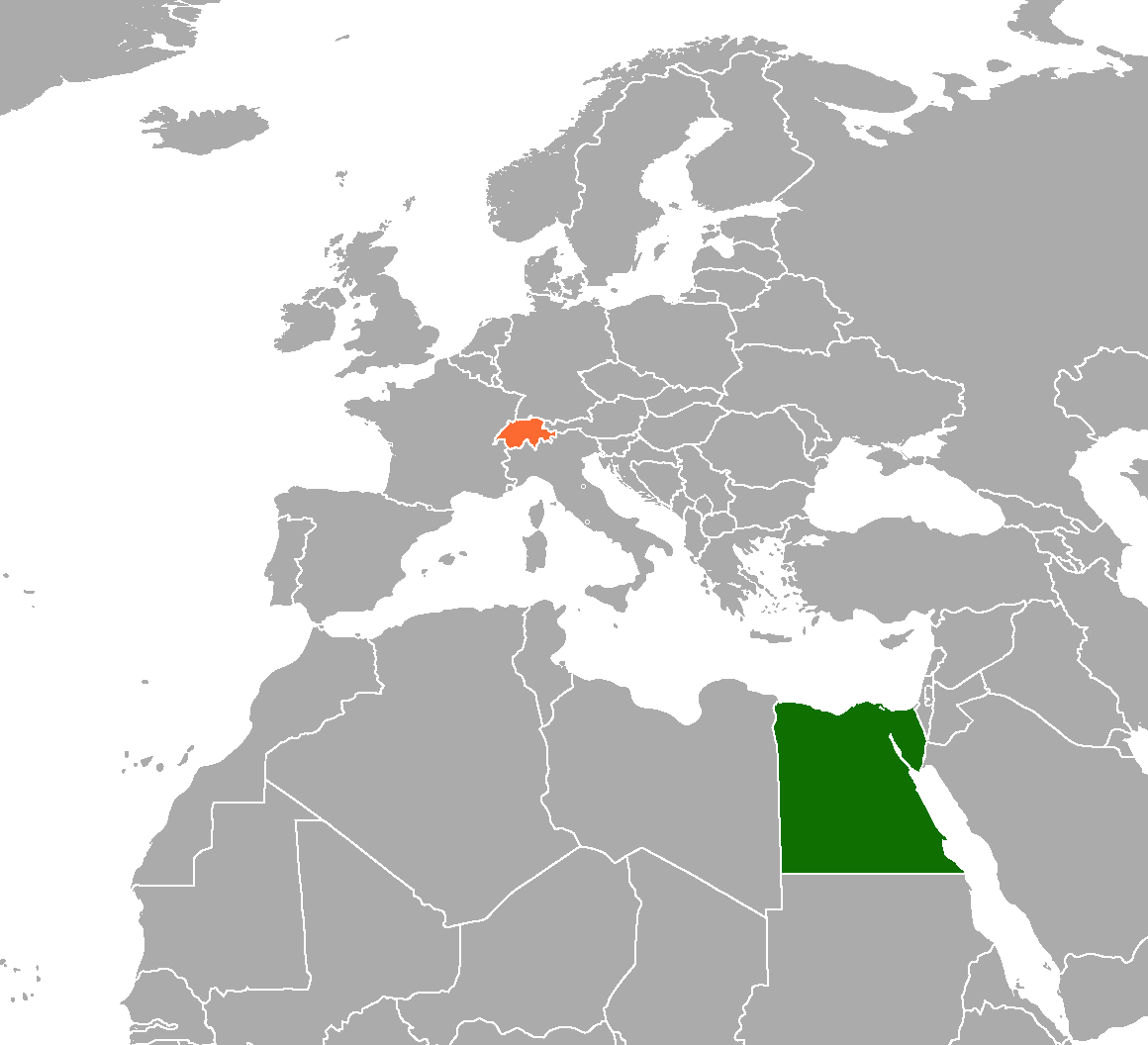
- Egypt: Switzerland

Egypt–Switzerland relations are the bilateral relations between Egypt and Switzerland. Official diplomatic relation between both countries date back from 1906, with the opening of a Swiss trade mission in Egypt.

Egypt has an embassy in Bern and a general consulate in Geneva. Switzerland has an embassy in Cairo.

== Cooperation ==
Swiss trade representation began in Egypt in 1906, since then there has been high trade activity between the two countries. Switzerland is Egypt's seventh-largest foreign investor. Bilateral trade volume was 1.5 billion USD in 2022, making Egypt Switzerland's largest trading partner in the African contient.

== Luxor massacre ==
On November 17, 1997, 36 Swiss tourists were killed in Luxor, Egypt, during the Luxor massacre. The attack was perpetrated by Al-Gama'a al-Islamiyya. The Swiss Federal Police "later determined that Osama bin Laden had financed the operation".

== Resident diplomatic missions ==
- Egypt has an embassy in Bern and consulate-general in Geneva.
- Switzerland has an embassy in Cairo.

== See also ==
- Foreign relations of Egypt
- Foreign relations of Switzerland
