= Egypt–Spain relations =

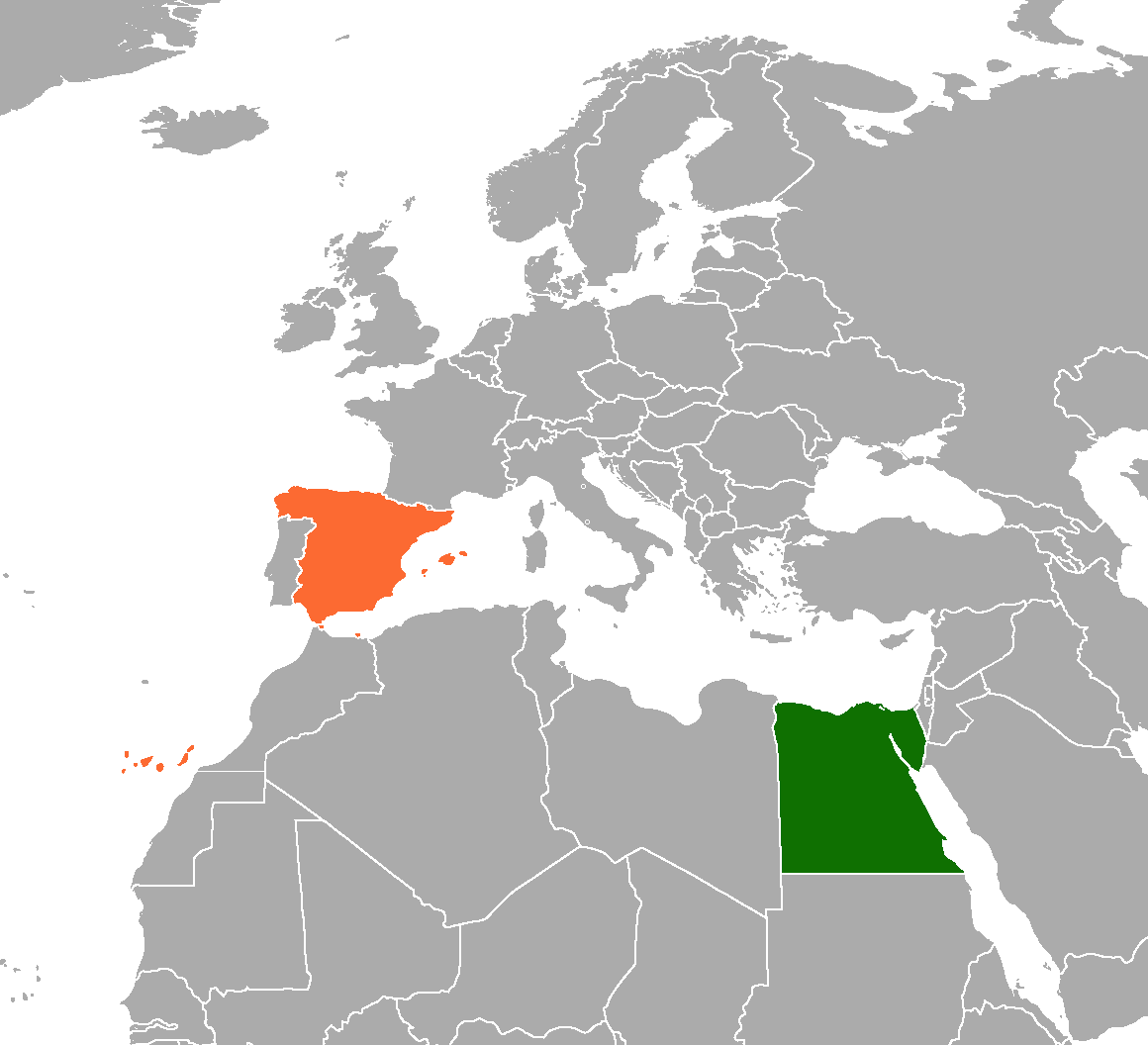
- Egypt: Spain

Egypt–Spain relations are the bilateral and diplomatic relations between these two countries. Egypt has an embassy in Madrid. Spain has an embassy in Cairo. Both countries share a common framework in the context of the Union for the Mediterranean.

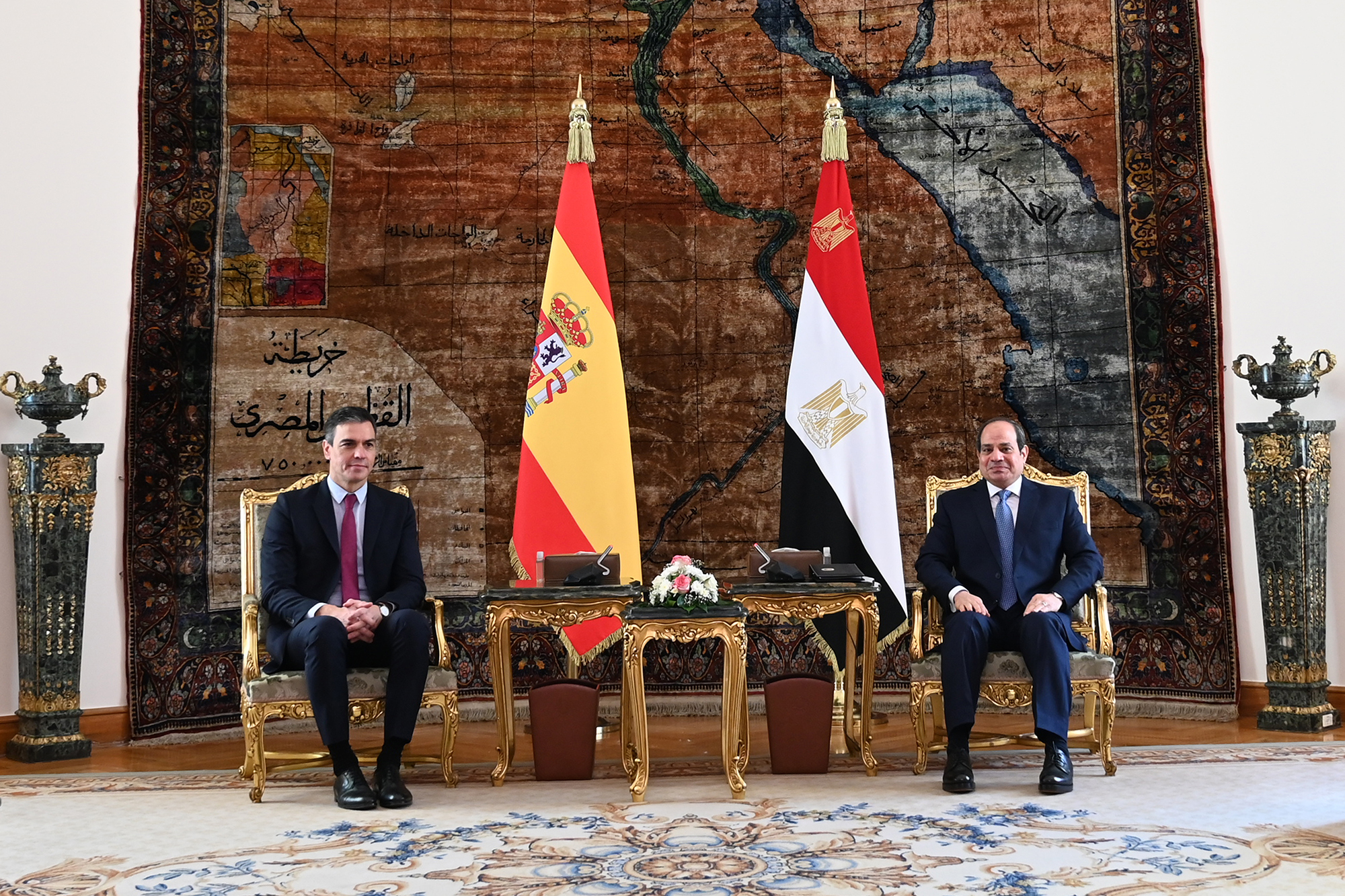
Spanish Prime Minister Pedro Sánchez with Egyptian President Abdel Fattah el-Sisi in Cairo, 1 December 2021

== Diplomatic relations ==
Following the independence of Egypt in 1922, Spain established a diplomatic delegation in Cairo; it however was not upgraded to the rank of embassy until 1949.

After the creation of the State of Israel in 1948, in the context of the hostility between Israel and Spain, with the former promoting the international isolation of Spain and the later failing to recognise the new State, a Pro-Arab line was fixed in Spain for the following years, shown in the ensuing conflicts that took place in the Middle East.

Despite the interest Falangists and some staunchly Anti-Western military officers had in further rapprochement towards Nasserism, the Francoist regime had to restrain to some extent due to the pro-Soviet overtures of Egypt, and the trouble such move could bring vis-à-vis the budding relations of Spain with the United States during the Cold War.

In the context of the 1956 Suez Crisis, Spain stood in a middle ground between the stance of the Western powers and the Egyptian one, showing a degree of understanding towards the Arab nation, at least from the legal standpoint. From this position, the Spanish diplomacy ambitioned to play a role in the crisis, providing a framework for a solution in the London Conference; however, the proposal did not enjoy the attention of any of the parts in conflict, although it was ultimately included within an annex of the final resolution.

Bilateral political relations have traditionally been fluid, without contentious and with frequent bilateral visits. Spain has been perceived as a friendly and close country, committed to Egypt and the region. The framework of these relations is determined by the bilateral Friendship and Cooperation Agreement signed in Cairo February 5 of 2008.

After the fall of the Hosni Mubarak regime, Spain has sought to relaunch bilateral relations by valuing the Spanish experience in the transition to democracy and being willing to accompany Egypt in its democratization. In the last two years, the momentum of bilateral relations first materialized with the visit to Cairo, on the 9th and 10 September 2012, of the Minister of Foreign Affairs and Cooperation José Manuel García-Margallo and, later, with the visit to Madrid, on November 6, of the Egyptian Foreign Minister Nabil Fahmy. This visit, the first of the Egyptian Minister to a European capital, served to resume political dialogue, review internal and international political news and examine economic and commercial relations, with special emphasis on Spanish investments in Egypt.

The strength of the bilateral relations was manifested in the two visits that Minister García-Margallo made to Egypt in July and December 2014, the latter transmitting an invitation to President Abdel Fattah el-Sisi to visit Spain. In September 2014, on the occasion of the International Conference on Libya held in Madrid, the Egyptian foreign minister Shoukry had held a bilateral meeting with his Spanish counterpart.

President Sisi's visit to Spain in April 2015, accompanied by different cabinet ministers, has been a further step in the consolidation of bilateral relations and a boost in bilateral economic relations, which has been reflected in the signing of agreements on cultural, tourism, interior, and economic matters, including MOUSs for cooperation in transport.

On 19 February 2025, Spanish prime minister Pedro Sánchez and Sisi signed an Strategic Partnership Agreement between both countries.

== Economic relations ==
The weight of bilateral trade between Spain and Egypt is reduced, since Egypt accounted for 0.23% of our total imports and 0.48% of Spanish exports in 2014. In that year, he ranked 36th in the ranking of the most important markets for Spanish exports and 57th as a supplier. Within the EU, in 2014 Spain ranked sixth as a customer after Italy, Germany, United Kingdom, France and Greece, representing 7% of Community imports, and 7th as supplier of Egypt, after Italy, Germany, France, Netherlands, United Kingdom and Belgium (7% of total Community exports).

The bilateral trade balance was negative for Spain since 2005, when Unión Fenosa gas liquefaction plant started operating in Damietta, due to the purchase of gas by UFG from Egypt to operate the plant and to export liquefied gas from Egypt. In 2013, when the supply of gas to the Damietta plant stopped, the bilateral trade balance became positive for Spain (Spanish exports €1,078 M, imports €888 M, 22% less than the figure registered on last year). In 2014 the trend continued (Spanish exports €1,149 M, increasing 7% and imports €598 M, decreasing 33%). The latest available data for the period January–November ce 2015 indicate that exports from Spain to Egypt have reached €1249 M and imports €399 M.

== Cooperation ==
Spanish Cooperation in Egypt has a long journey that begins in the year 1967, with the first Cultural Cooperation Agreement, and which has been extended since then, with the Agreement on Scientific and Technical Cooperation of 1991 and with the agreements of the different Mixed Commissions held. Currently, the agreements of the IV Hispanic-Egyptian Joint Commission for Educational, Cultural, Technical and Scientific Cooperation held in Madrid in 2005 are still in force. The overall strategic objective of the Spanish Cooperation in Egypt has been to contribute to increasing the capacities of the country, its institutions and civil society, in order to support a sustainable and equitable social and economic development of the country.

The process of political and social changes that took place in Egypt in the wake of the Arab spring, led to a reformulation of the development cooperation policy in the region, focusing on accompanying the processes of transition to democracy.

The Masar Program is a Spanish Cooperation program initiated in June 2012, whose purpose is to accompany the processes of democratic transition in the Arab World, contributing to the modernization and strengthening of institutions, and to the support and strengthening of the civil society and the key actors in the development of the rule of law, so that public authorities can respond to the needs of their societies, and civil society can be one of the engines of change.

In December 2015 a new initiative was approved, financed through the Masar Program, focused again on supporting Institutions, in this case the National Human Rights Council, to strengthen its advisory role after the parliamentary elections, respecting the Constitution and democratic institutions.

In Multilateral Cooperation, the support for the political empowerment of women in Egypt stands out, and support for the Safe Cities project, channeled through UN Women, and still in force during 2016.

In the field of coordination with the European Union Programs, Spanish Cooperation actively participates in the Joint Programming until 2020. During the year 201, participation in the EU project in the Justice sector for “Support for the modernization of the administration of Justice in Egypt” that provides for technical assistance by a consortium of Public Administrations of partner countries has begun to the Egyptian Justice Administration, led by France in consortium with the AECID that will implement the support component to the National Center for Judicial Studies.

== Resident diplomatic missions ==
- Egypt has an embassy in Madrid.
- Spain has an embassy in Cairo.
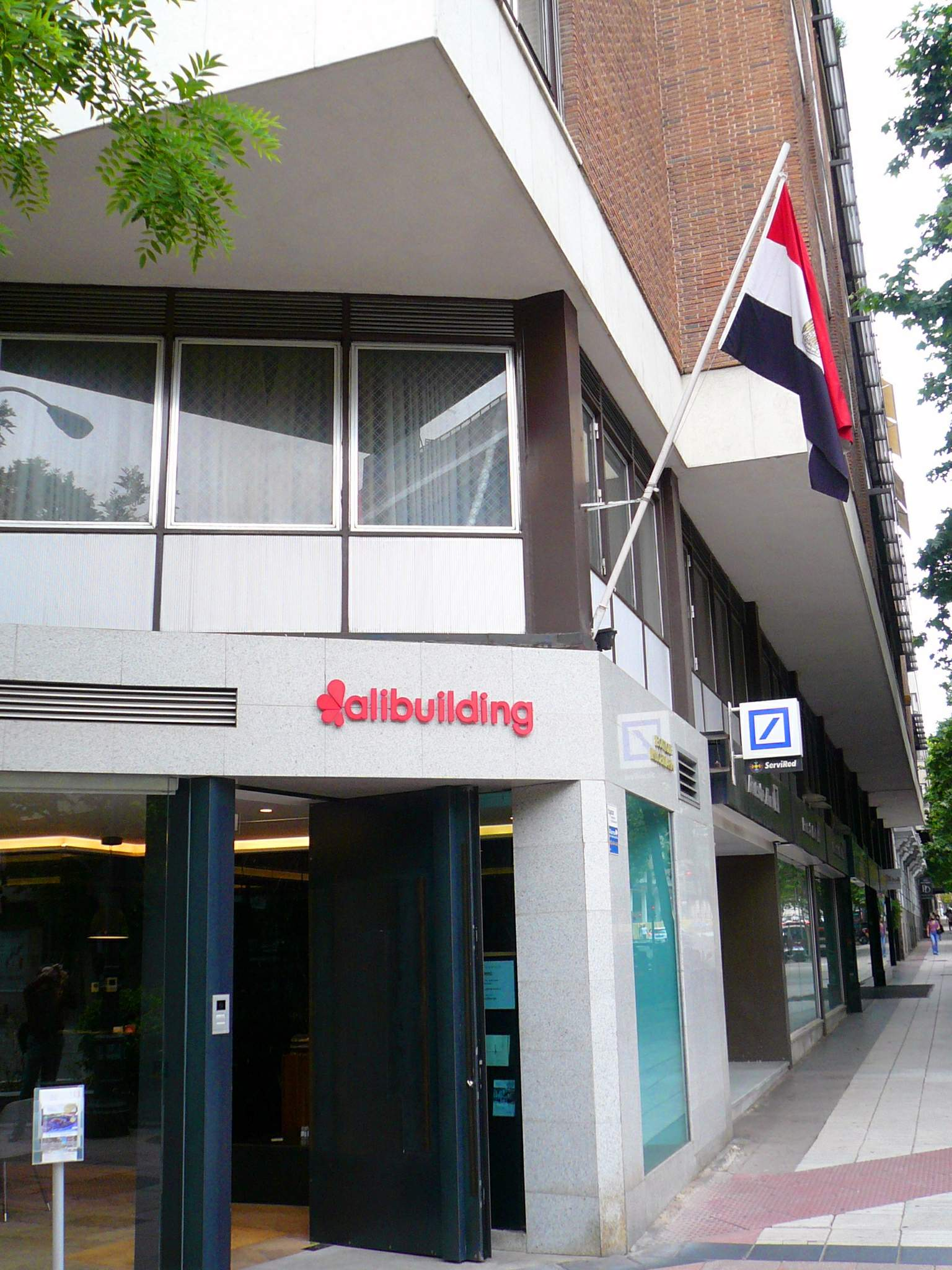
Embassy of Egypt in Madrid

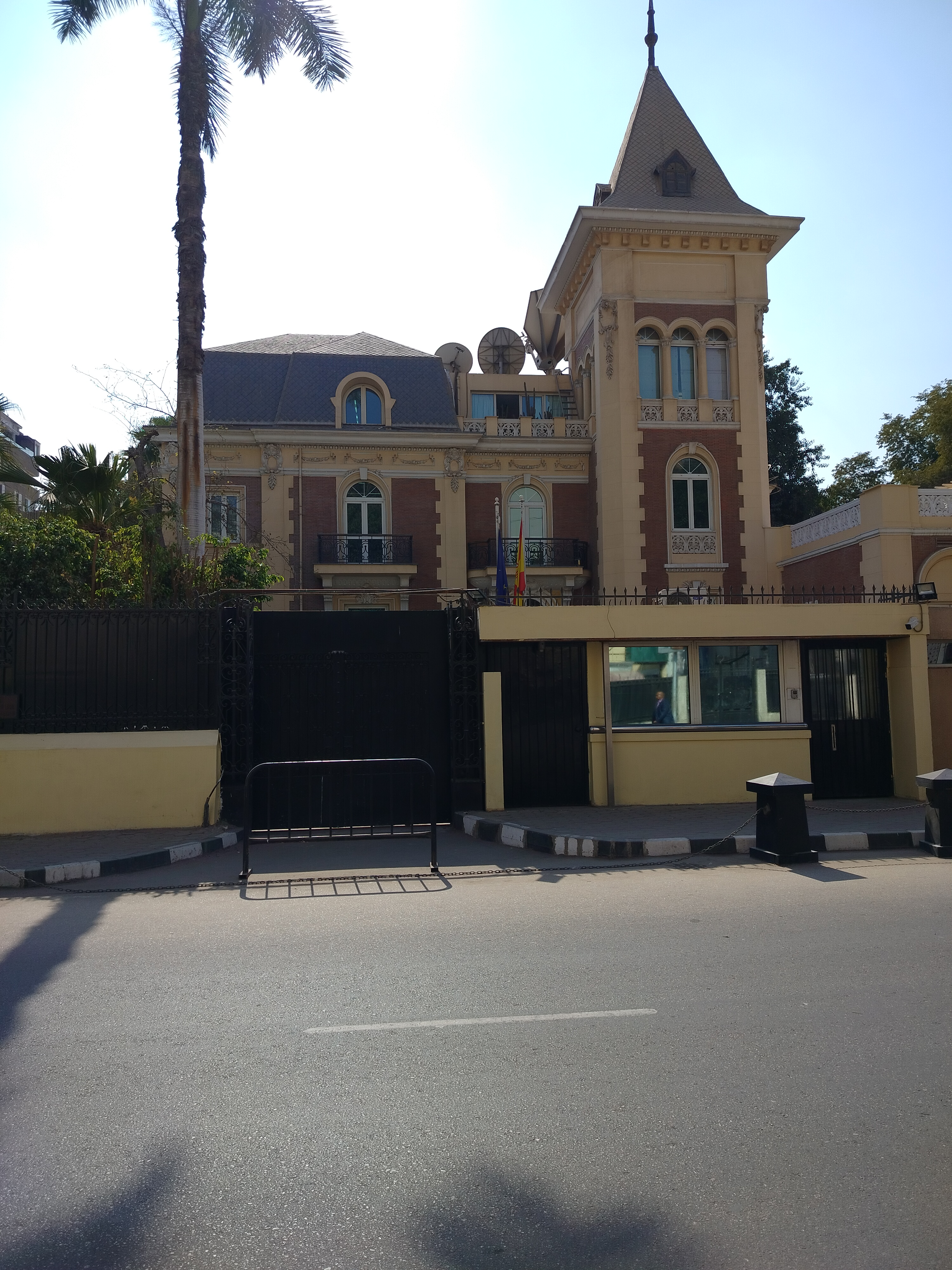
Embassy of Spain in Cairo

== See also ==
- Foreign relations of Egypt
- Foreign relations of Spain
