= Bulgaria–Egypt relations =

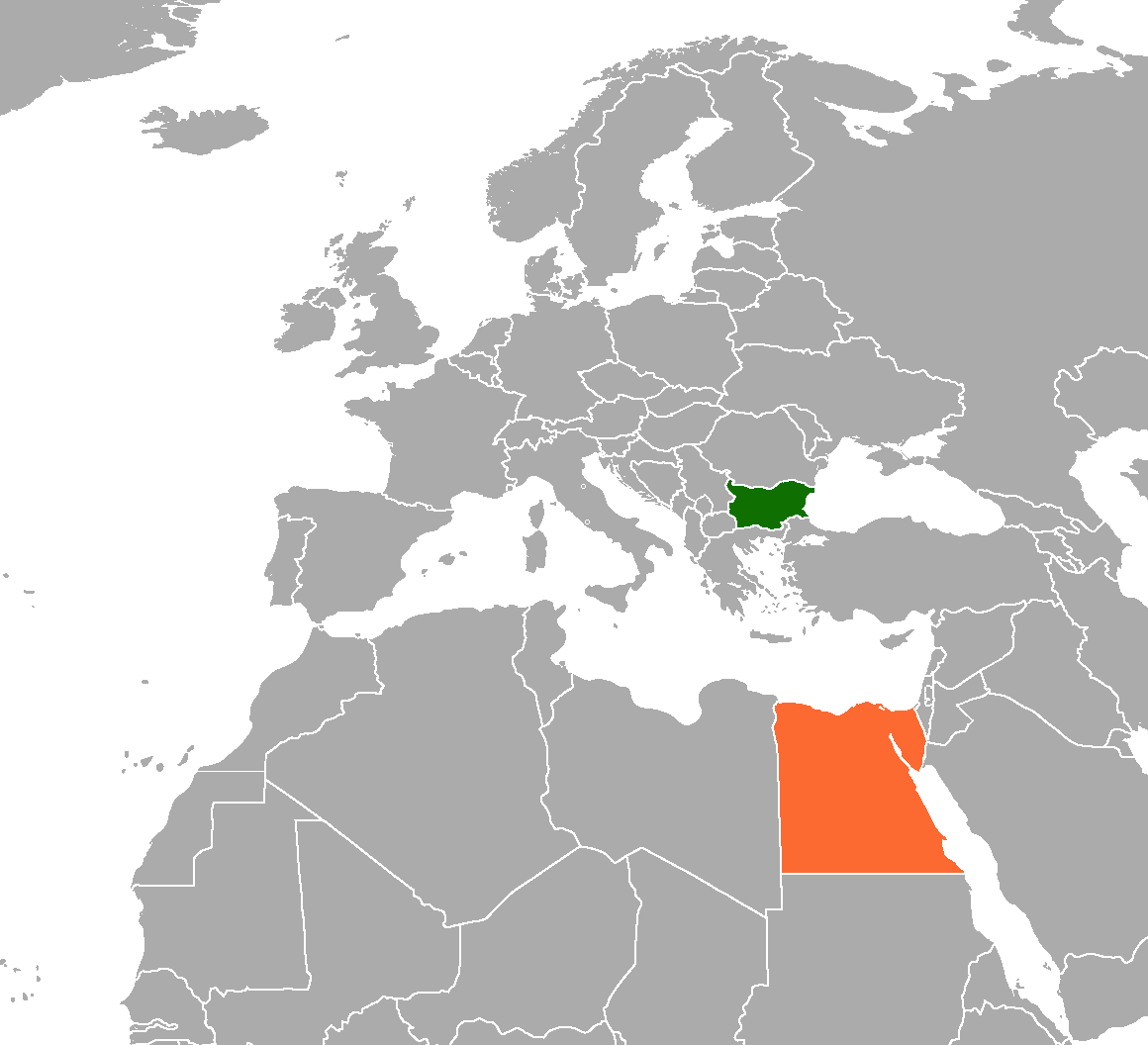

- Bulgaria: Egypt

Bulgaria–Egypt relations are foreign relations between Bulgaria and Egypt. Bulgaria has an embassy in Cairo. Egypt has an embassy in Sofia. Both countries are full members of the Union for the Mediterranean. The Bulgarian Minister of Economy visited Cairo between 28 November and 2 December for EDEX 2021, alongside 12 other Bulgarian companies with Egyptian President Abdel Fattah El-Sisi and Rumen Radev expressing intent for increased trade and co-operation.

== Resident diplomatic missions ==
- Bulgaria has an embassy in Cairo.
- Egypt has an embassy in Sofia.

== See also ==
- Foreign relations of Bulgaria
- Foreign relations of Egypt
