= Egypt–Ukraine relations =

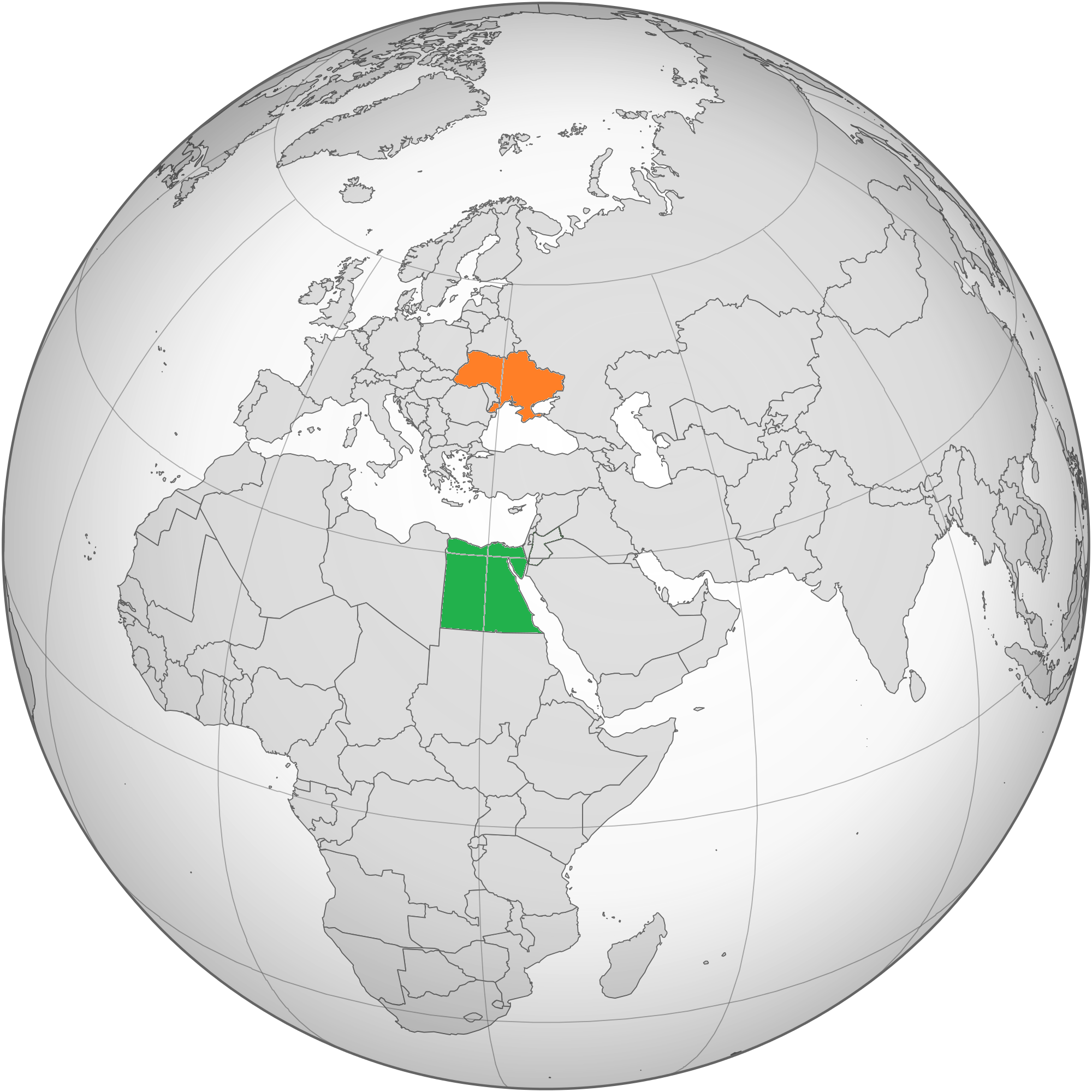
- Egypt: Ukraine

Egypt–Ukraine relations refer to bilateral relations between Egypt and Ukraine. Both countries established foreign relations in 1992. Since 1993, Egypt has an embassy in Kyiv, while Ukraine has an embassy in Cairo and an honorary consulate in Alexandria.

== Egypt's stance on the Russo-Ukraine War ==
In June 2023, a delegation from Africa, including representatives from Egypt, visited Ukraine and Russia with a call for peace. Egypt has maintained a generally neutral stance due to the "rational analysis of the consequences of the war" and has emphasized clarity on the ramifications of conflict. According to The State Information Service, Egypt has endorsed efforts aimed at stopping the war, as developing countries, including Egypt, remain the most affected in terms of food and energy security.

On November 11, 2022, Egypt sent 40,000 rockets to Ukraine which were meant to go to Russia.

== Resident diplomatic missions ==
- Egypt has an embassy in Kyiv.
- Ukraine has an embassy in Cairo.

== See also ==
- Foreign relations of Egypt
- Foreign relations of Ukraine
