= List of diplomatic missions in Egypt =

This is a list of diplomatic missions in Egypt. At present, the capital city of Cairo hosts 139 embassies. Several other countries have ambassadors accredited from other regional capitals. Honorary consulates are excluded from this listing.

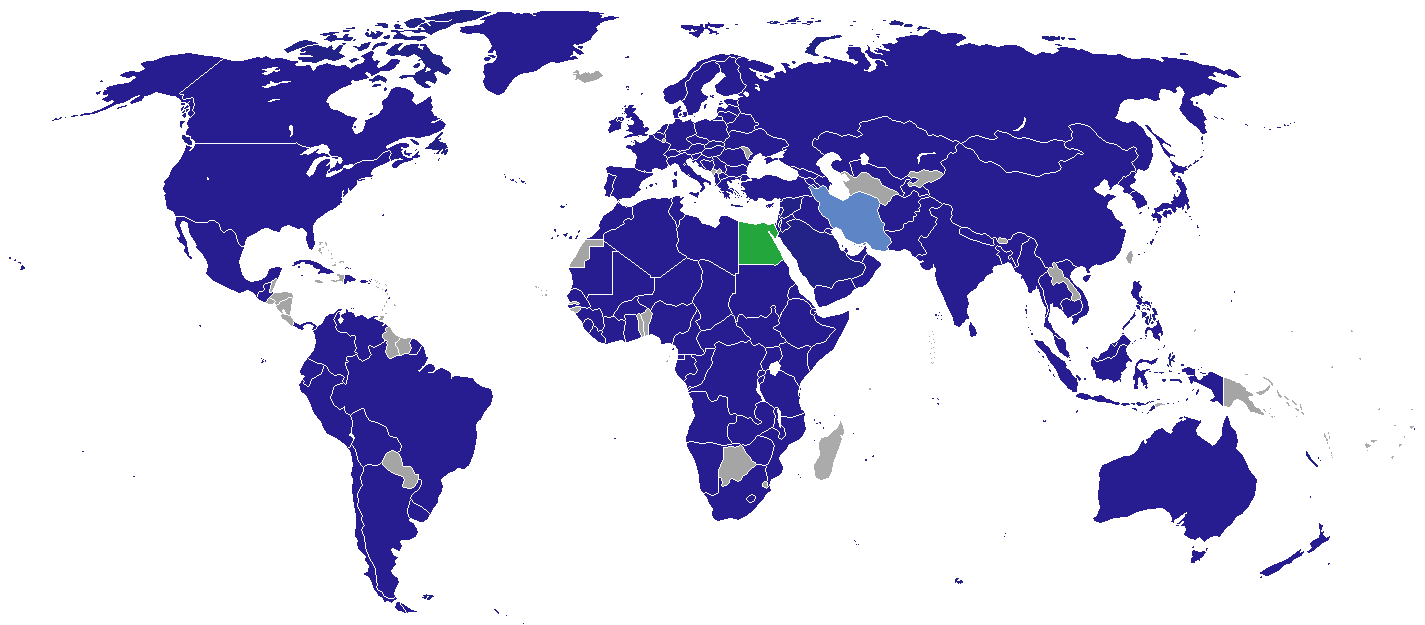
Diplomatic missions in Egypt

== Diplomatic missions in Cairo ==
=== Embassies ===
1. Afghanistan
2. Algeria
3. Albania
4. Angola
5. Argentina
6. Armenia
7. Australia
8. Austria
9. Azerbaijan
10. Bahrain
11. Bangladesh
12. Belarus
13. Belgium
14. Bolivia
15. Bosnia and Herzegovina
16. Brazil
17. Brunei
18. Bulgaria
19. Burkina Faso
20. Burundi
21. Cambodia
22. Cameroon
23. Canada
24. Central African Republic
25. Chad
26. Chile
27. China
28. Colombia
29. Comoros
30. Congo-Brazzaville
31. Congo-Kinshasa
32. Croatia
33. Cuba
34. Cyprus
35. Czech Republic
36. Denmark
37. Djibouti
38. Dominican Republic
39. Ecuador
40. Equatorial Guinea
41. Eritrea
42. Estonia
43. Ethiopia
44. Finland
45. France
46. Gabon
47. Georgia
48. Germany
49. Ghana
50. Greece
51. Guatemala
52. Guinea
53. Holy See
54. Hungary
55. India
56. Indonesia
57. Iraq
58. Ireland
59. Israel
60. Italy
61. Ivory Coast
62. Japan
63. Jordan
64. Kazakhstan
65. Kenya
66. Kuwait
67. Latvia
68. Lebanon
69. Lesotho
70. Liberia
71. Libya
72. Lithuania
73. Malawi
74. Malaysia
75. Mali
76. Malta
77. Mauritania
78. Mauritius
79. Mexico
80. Mongolia
81. Morocco
82. Mozambique
83. Myanmar
84. Namibia
85. Nepal
86. Netherlands
87. New Zealand
88. Niger
89. Nigeria
90. North Korea
91. North Macedonia
92. Norway
93. Oman
94. Pakistan
95. Palestine
96. Panama
97. Peru
98. Philippines
99. Poland
100. Portugal
101. Qatar
102. Romania
103. Russia
104. Rwanda
105. Saudi Arabia
106. Senegal
107. Serbia
108. Sierra Leone
109. Singapore
110. Slovakia
111. Slovenia
112. Somalia
113. South Africa
114. Sovereign Military Order of Malta
115. South Korea
116. South Sudan
117. Spain
118. Sri Lanka
119. Sudan
120. Sweden
121. Switzerland
122. Syria
123. Tajikistan
124. Tanzania
125. Thailand
126. Tunisia
127. Turkey
128. Uganda
129. Ukraine
130. United Arab Emirates
131. United Kingdom
132. United States
133. Uruguay
134. Uzbekistan
135. Venezuela
136. Vietnam
137. Yemen
138. Zambia
139. Zimbabwe

=== Other delegations or missions ===
- African Union (Permanent Delegation to the Arab League)
- European Union (Delegation)
- Iran (Interests Section; Turkey is protecting power)
- Kosovo (Liaison Office)

=== Gallery ===
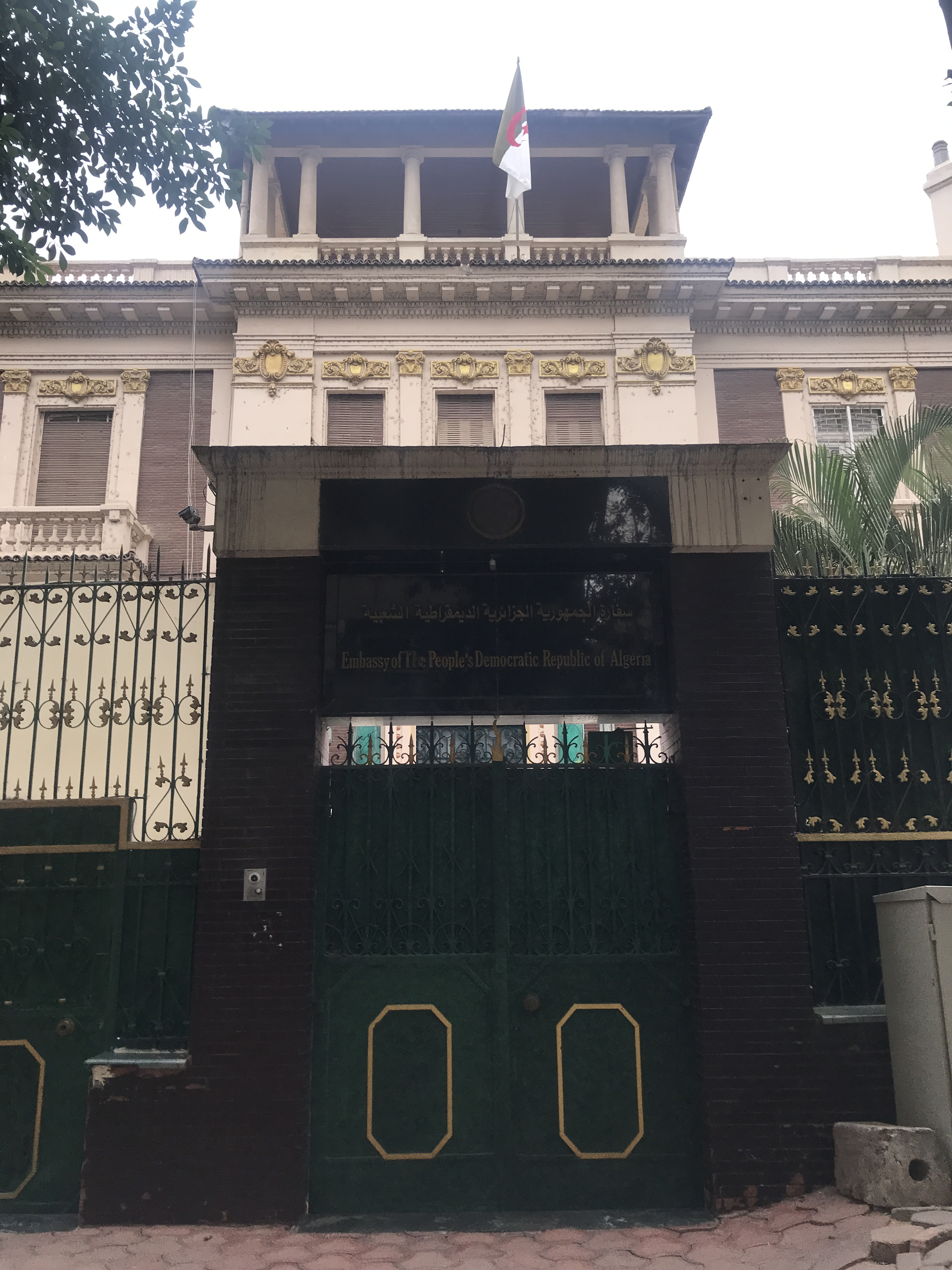
Embassy of Algeria

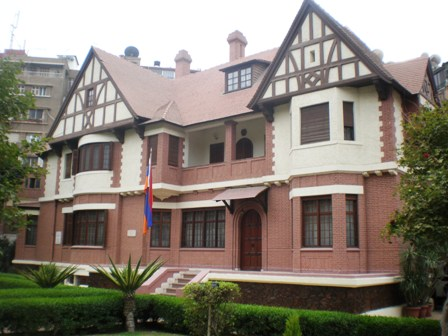
Embassy of Armenia

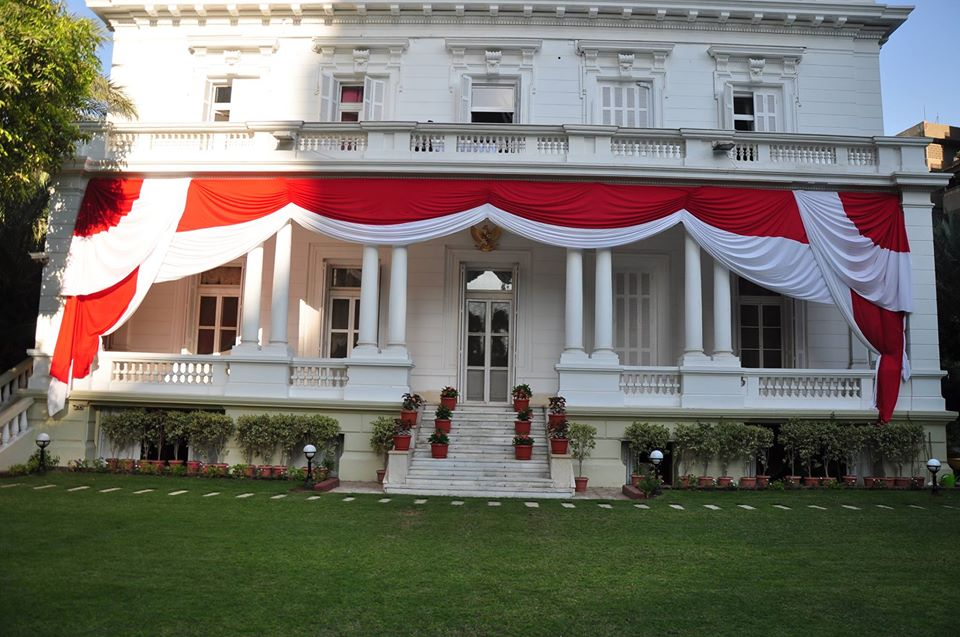
Embassy of Indonesia

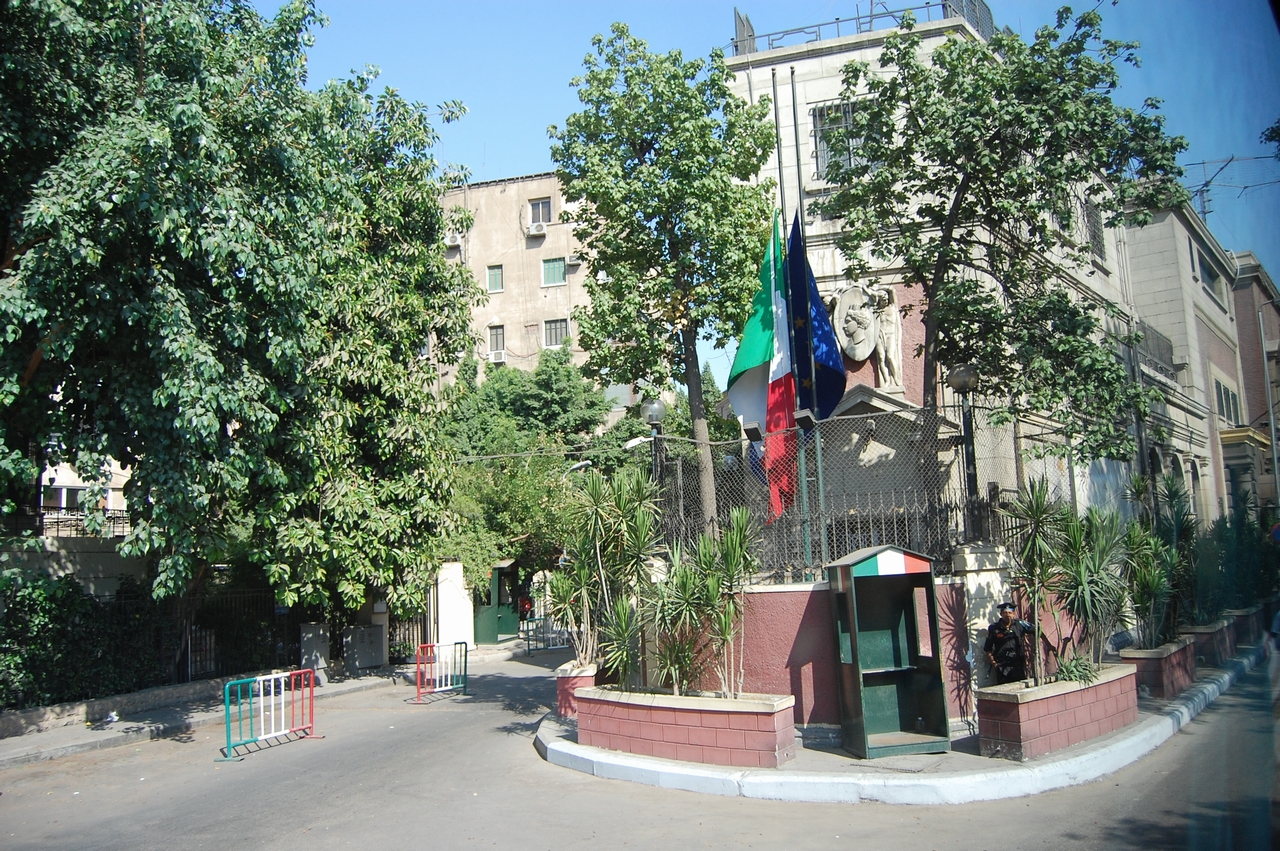
Embassy of Italy

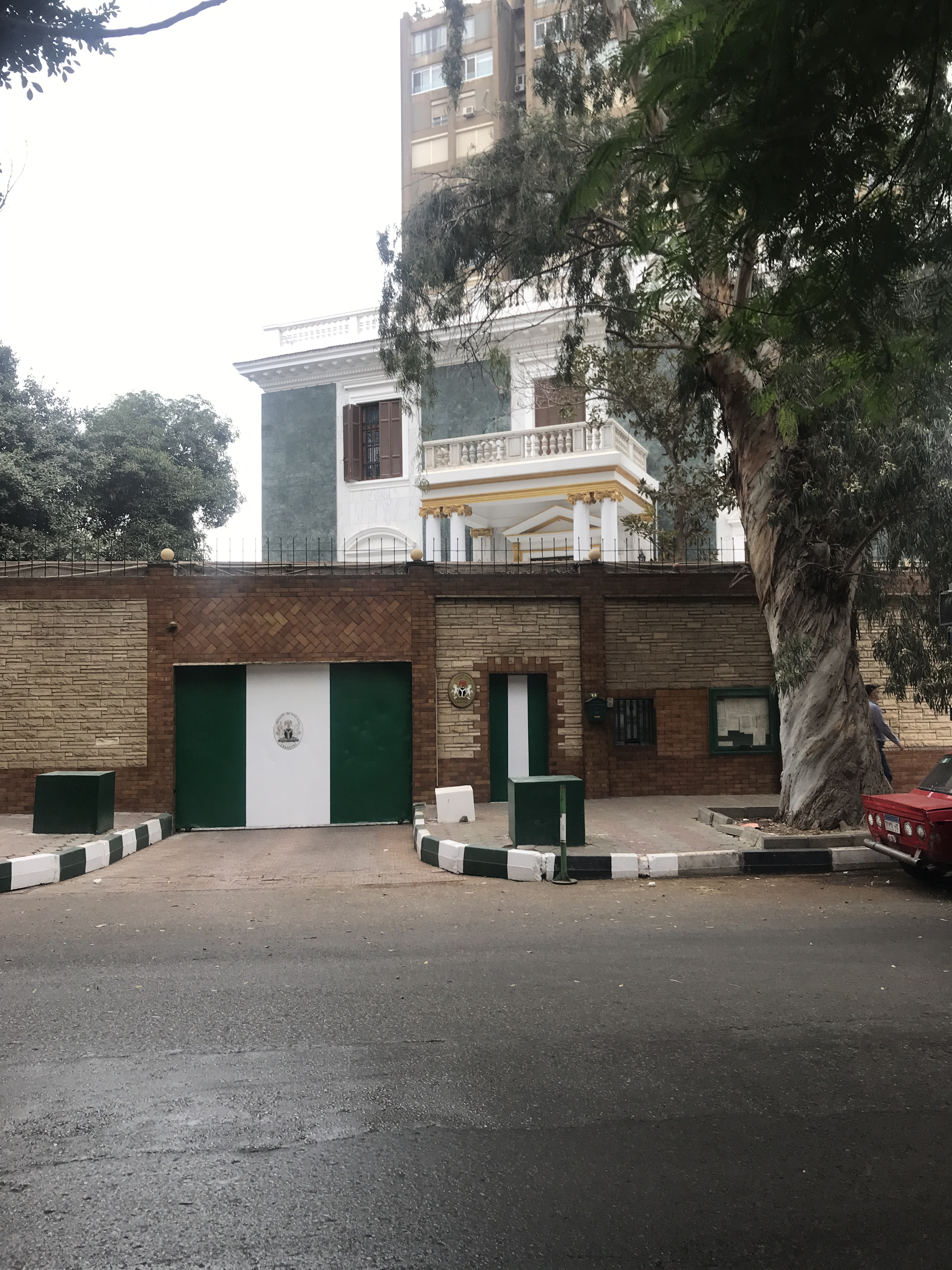
Embassy of Nigeria

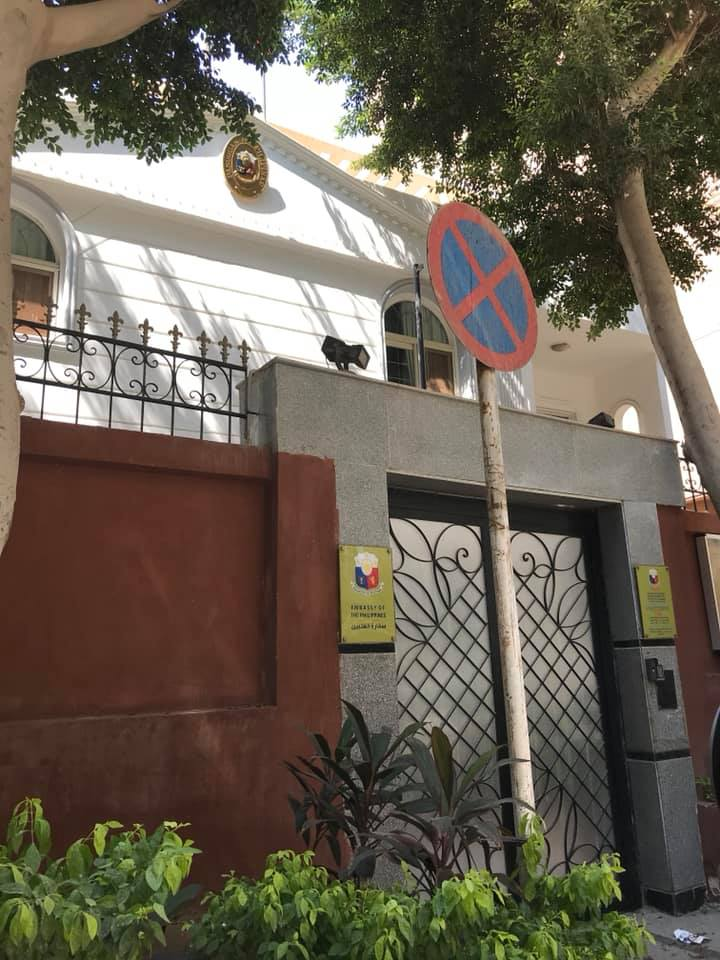
Embassy of the Philippines

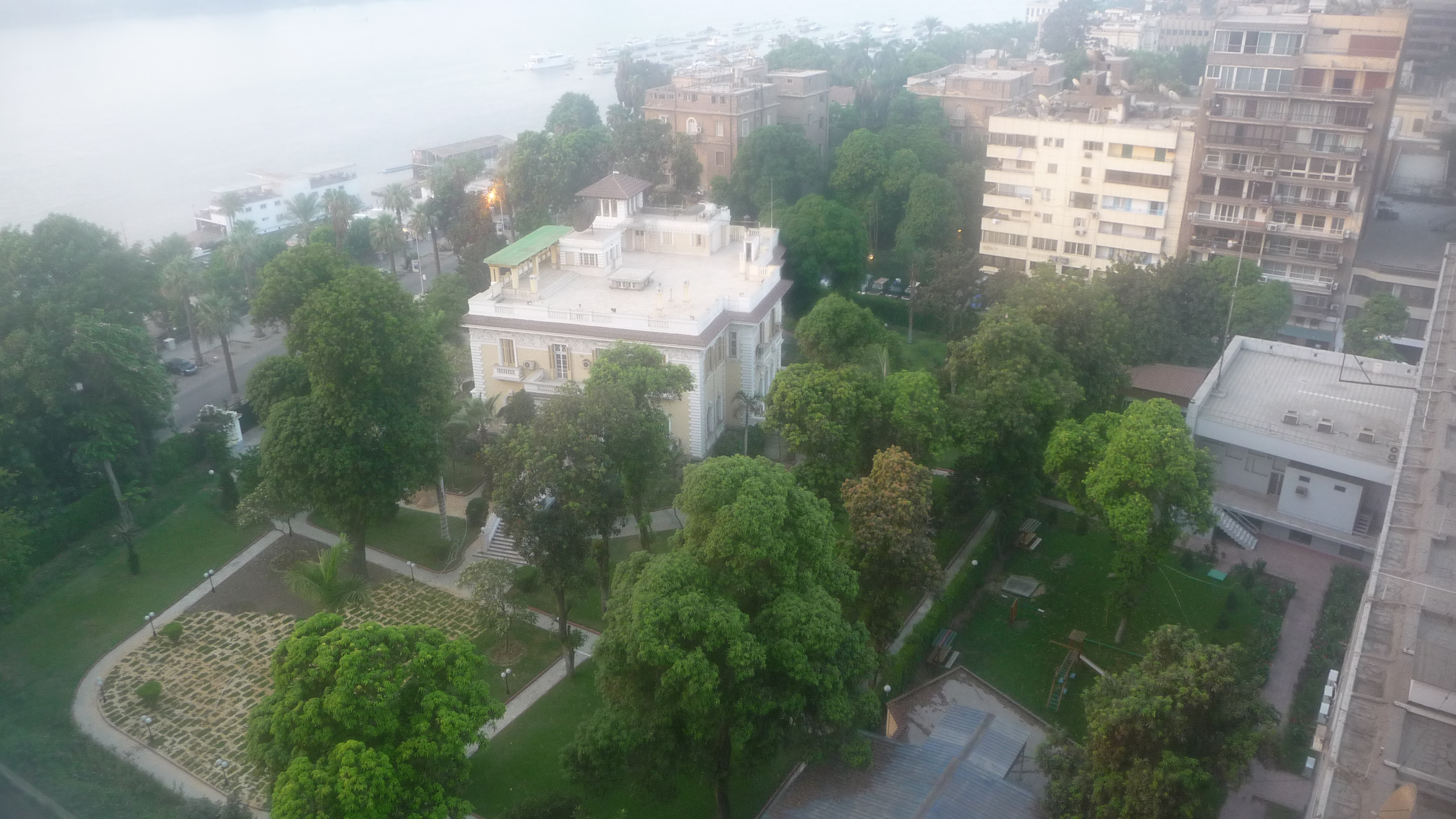
Embassy of Russia

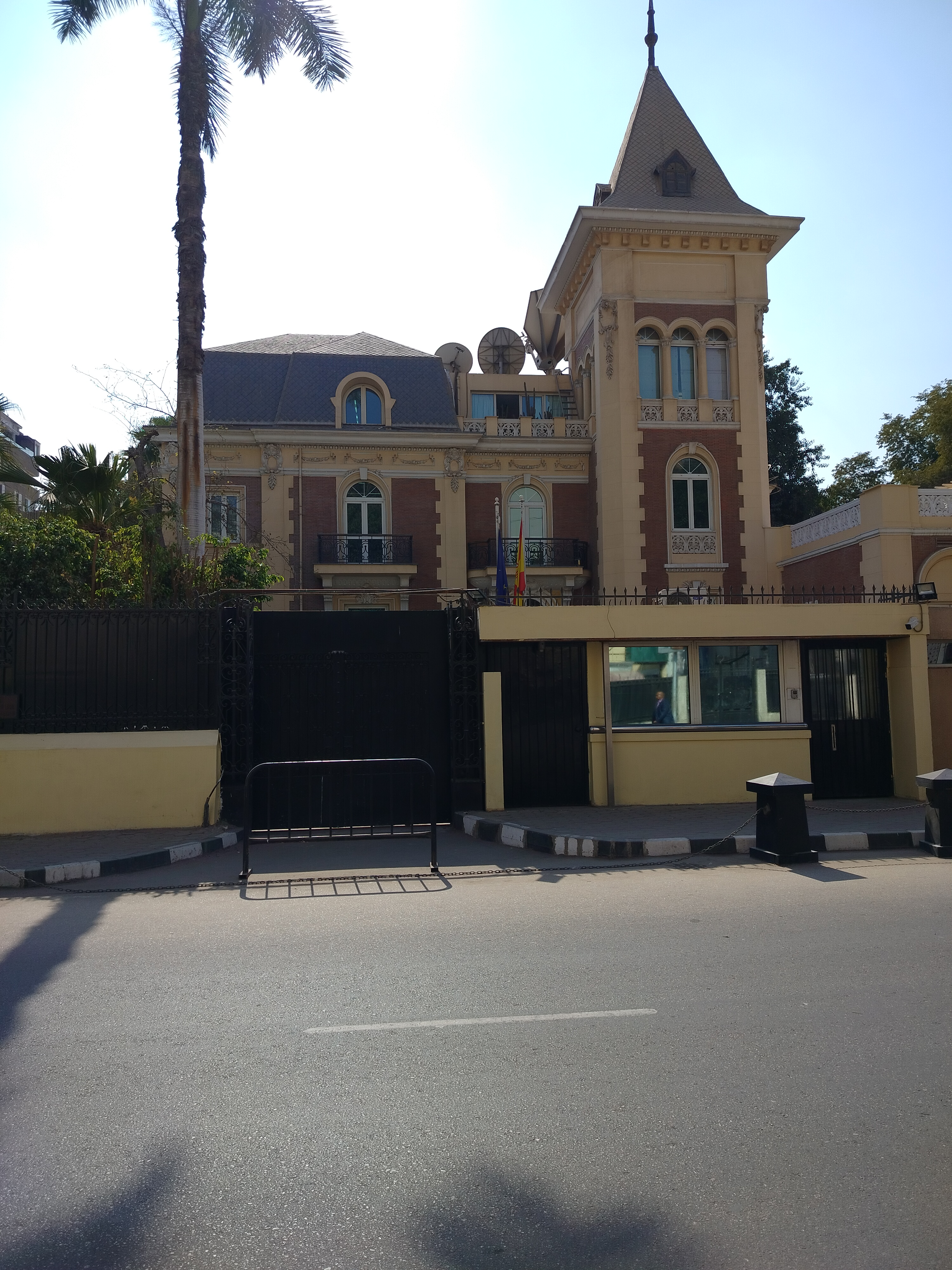
Embassy of Spain

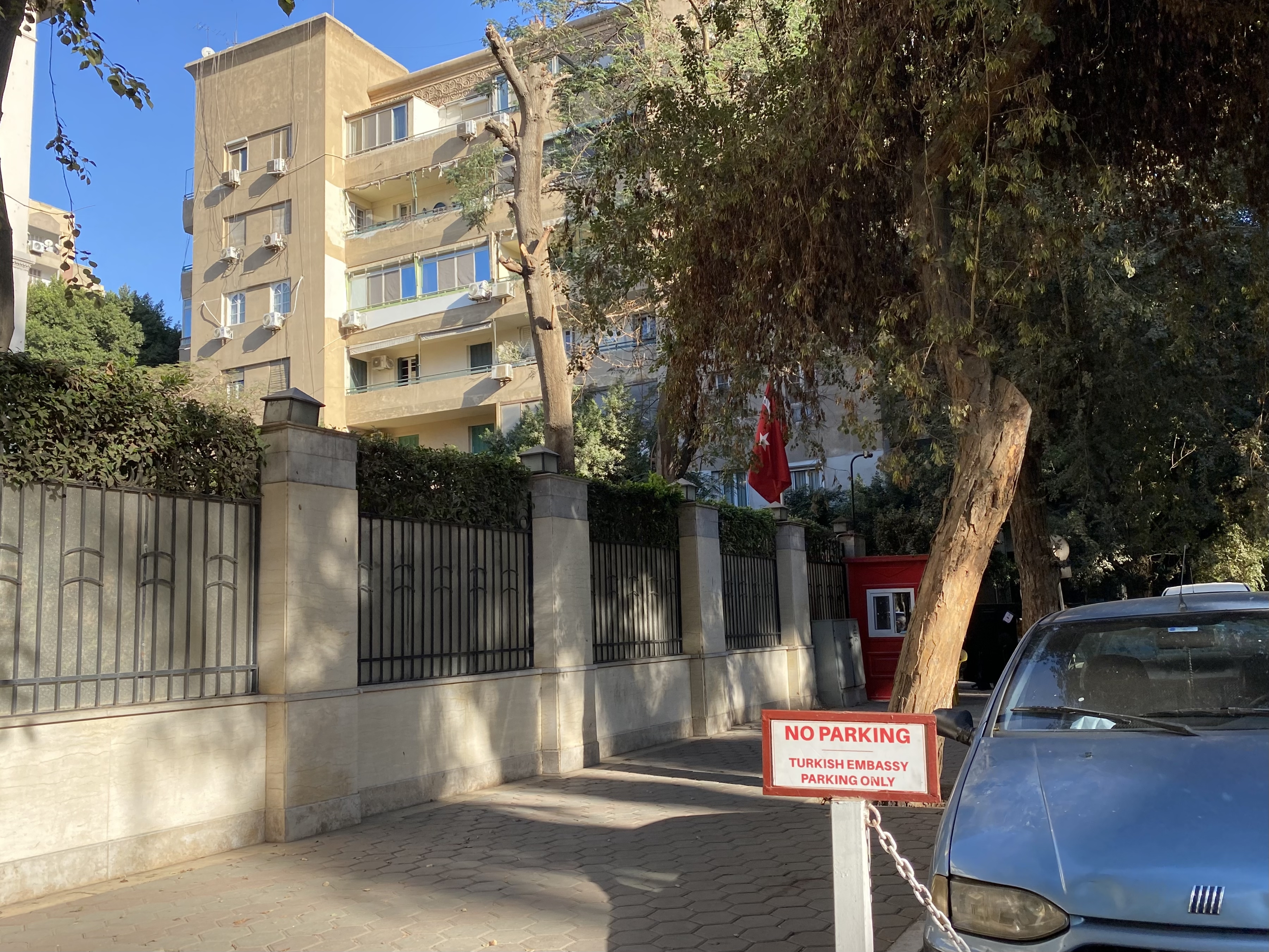
Embassy of Turkey

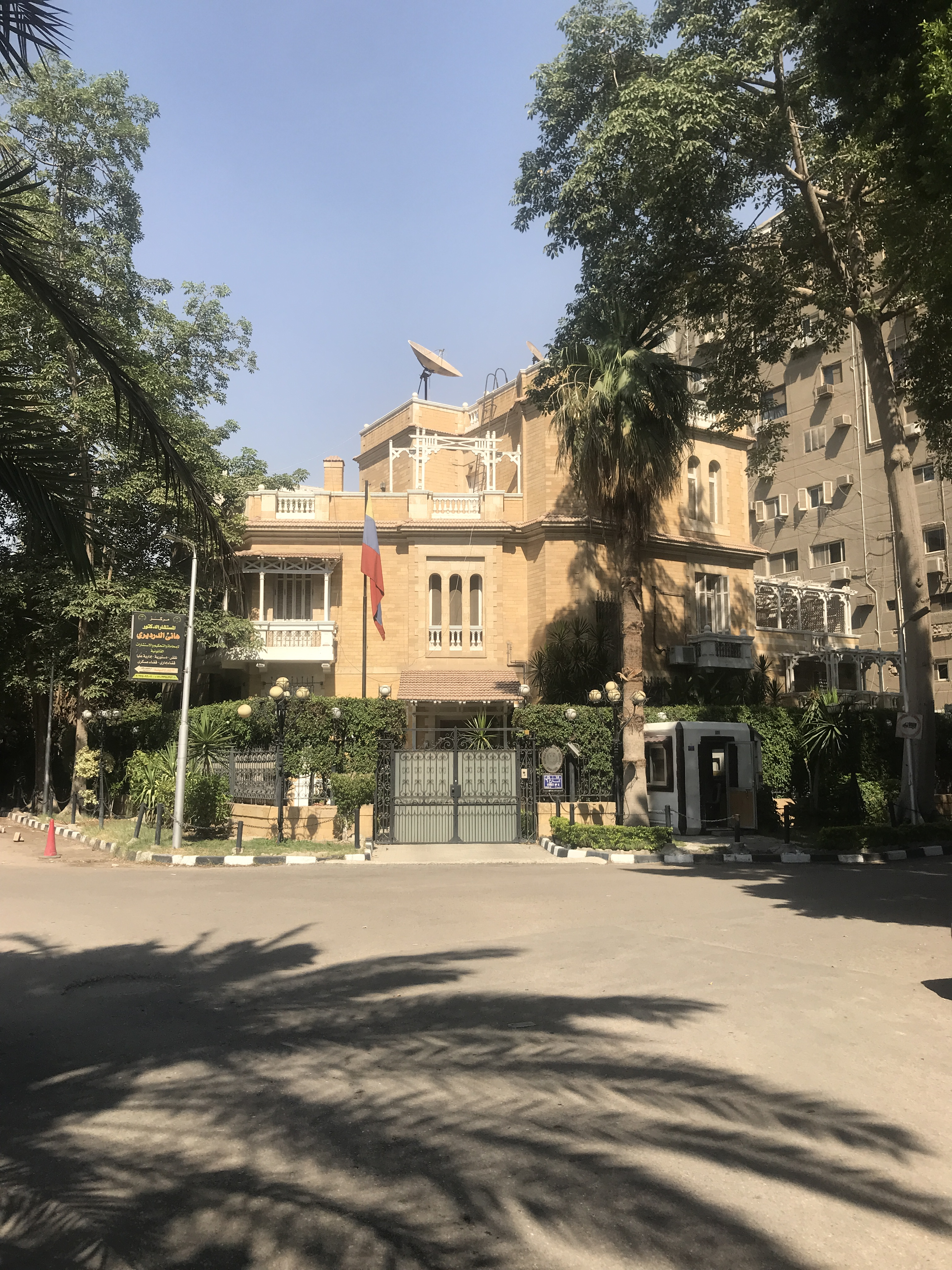
Embassy of Venezuela

== Consular missions ==
The cities of Alexandria, Aswan, Hurghada, and Suez are host to career consular missions. All entries are consulates-general unless otherwise indicated.

=== Alexandria, Alexandria Governorate ===
- China
- France
- Greece
- Israel
- Lebanon
- Libya
- Russia
- Saudi Arabia
- Turkey
- United Kingdom

=== Aswan, Aswan Governorate ===
- Sudan

=== Hurghada, Red Sea Governorate ===
- Russia

=== Suez, Suez Governorate ===
- Saudi Arabia

== Non-resident embassies ==
=== Resident in Abu Dhabi, UAE ===
- Fiji
- Maldives
- Moldova
- Montenegro
- Tonga
- Tuvalu

=== Resident in Kuwait City, Kuwait ===
- Bhutan
- Botswana
- Eswatini
- Guyana
- Honduras

=== Resident in Rabat, Morocco ===
- Antigua and Barbuda
- Benin
- Cape Verde
- Dominica
- El Salvador
- Gambia
- Grenada
- Haiti
- Saint Kitts and Nevis
- Saint Lucia
- Saint Vincent and the Grenadines
- Suriname
- Togo

=== Resident Riyadh, Saudi Arabia ===
- Guinea-Bissau
- Kyrgyzstan
- Madagascar
- Turkmenistan

=== Resident in other cities ===
- Costa Rica (Nairobi)
- Iceland (Kampala)
- Laos (New Delhi)
- Nicaragua (Ankara)
- Seychelles (Addis Ababa)
- Republic of China (Taiwan) (Amman)
- Timor-Leste (Pretoria)
- Trinidad and Tobago (Abuja)

== Embassies to open ==
- El Salvador
- Kyrgyzstan
- Moldova
- Nicaragua

== Closed missions ==
Host city	Sending country	Mission	Year closed	Ref.
Cairo	Costa Rica	Embassy	1984	
Cairo	El Salvador	Embassy	1984	
Cairo	Swaziland	Embassy	2011	
Cairo	Honduras	Embassy	Unknown	
Cairo	Iran	Embassy	1979	
Cairo	Paraguay	Embassy	2024	
Alexandria	Brazil	Consulate	Unknown	
Alexandria	Germany	Consulate-General	2008	
Alexandria	Italy	Consulate-General	2014	
Alexandria	Japan	Consular office	2004	
Alexandria	Morocco	Consulate-General	2015	
Alexandria	Spain	Consulate-General	2021	
Alexandria	United States	Consulate-General	2018	

== See also ==
- Foreign relations of Egypt
- List of diplomatic missions of Egypt
- Visa requirements for Egyptian citizens
