= Egypt–South Sudan relations =

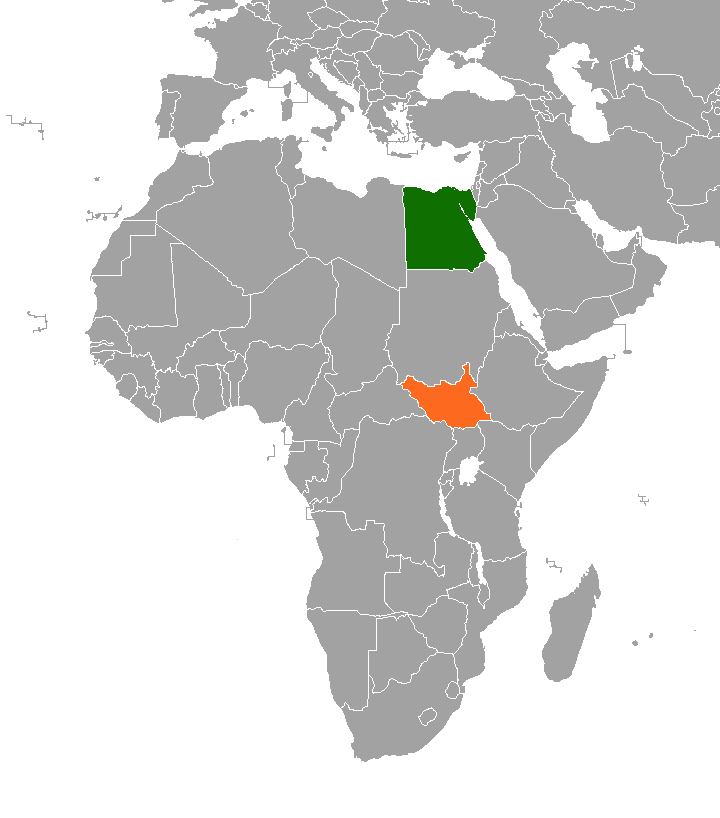

- Egypt: South Sudan

The Arab Republic of Egypt and the Republic of South Sudan established relations in 2011.

== History ==
Egypt recognised South Sudan on 9 July 2011, making it the second country to do so. In addition, Prime Minister Essam Sharaf made his first foreign visit to Khartoum and Juba in the lead-up to the country's secession.

Following an outbreak of violence in South Sudan, Egyptian Foreign Minister Nabil Fahmy stated that over the past few days Egypt "had paid close attention to the developments of the crisis in South Sudan, its security and humanitarian situation, valuing the stability of fraternal South Sudan and the strategic relations between both countries on governmental and non-governmental levels". He also added that a special envoy will be sent to South Sudan on an urgent diplomatic mission to ease talks and reassure their South Sudanese counterparts that Egypt would help them overcome the crisis. The delegation later arrived on December 27 led by Deputy Minister for African Affairs Hamdi Sanad Loza and met with South Sudan's President Salva Kiir announcing that Egypt "will support all regional efforts aimed at reaching a quick solution to the current crisis and has full confidence that all parties want to contain the crisis before it escalates". In addition, Egyptian Defense Minister Abdel Fattah el-Sisi dispatched a military aircraft that took off from an airbase on Friday morning in Egypt carrying humanitarian aid to South Sudan which was described by Loza as "a small contribution to help overcome the emergency humanitarian crisis the people of South Sudan are going through". The shipment contained urgent aid consisting of eight tonnes of food and medical supplies aimed at helping its people amid the current humanitarian crisis.

In November 2020, Abdel Fattah el-Sisi visited South Sudan, making him the first President of Egypt to do so.

== See also ==
- Foreign relations of Egypt
- Foreign relations of South Sudan
