= Argentina–Egypt relations =

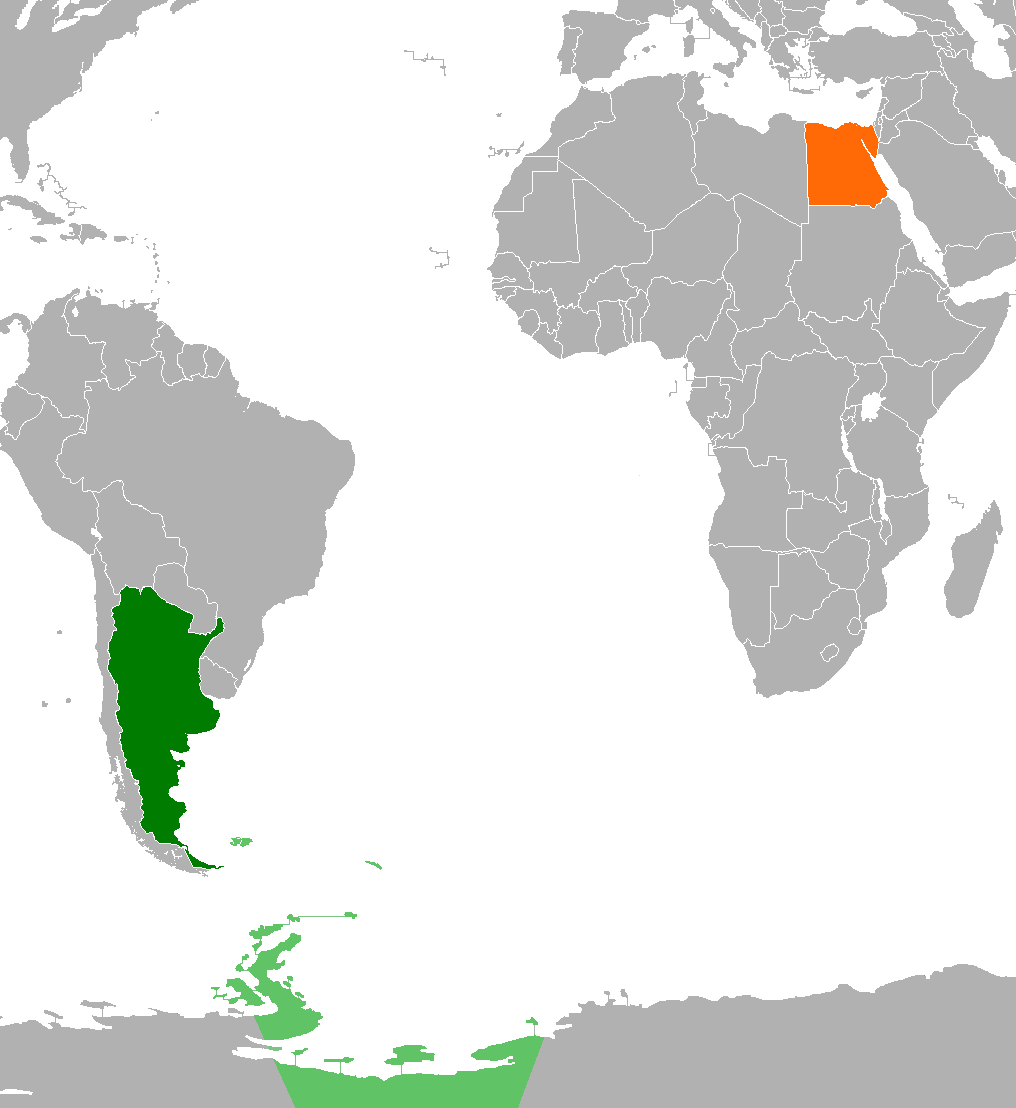
- Argentina: Egypt

Diplomatic relations between the Argentine Republic and the Arab Republic of Egypt were established in 1947. Argentina has an embassy in Cairo and Egypt has an embassy in Buenos Aires.

== Economic relations ==
The countries signed an economic co-operation protocol in 1998, during a visit of Abdul Shara, the secretary general of the Union of Egyptian Trade Chambers to Argentina. At that time, the yearly value of trade between the two countries was $460 million, with Argentine exports comprising some $456.3 million of that total, and Egyptian exports comprising just $3.7 million. In 2016, Argentine exports to Egypt amounted to $1.8 billion while Egyptian exports to Argentina amounted to just US$8.2 million.

== High level visits ==
The first Argentine Head of State to make an official visit to Egypt was Carlos Menem, who travelled to Egypt in 1998 and observed the opening of the Egyptian atomic reactor, which had been constructed with Argentine assistance.

Cristina Kirchner, the President of Argentina, made an official visit to Egypt in November 2008, meeting with Egyptian president Hosni Mubarak, as well as the secretary general of the League of Arab States, Amr Mussa. Her entourage included representatives of 80 Argentine companies, which met with 300 Egyptian business to discuss possible trade arrangements. Meetings between business representatives of the two nations focused on expanding the ability of Argentine business to reach the Egyptian markets for food, mechanical products and gas.

In 1999, Minister of Interior for Argentina Carlos Corach travelled to Cairo, where he met with the Egyptian Minister of Interior Habib El-Adli for discussions on co-operation between the two countries in dealing with terrorism and organized crime. This was followed by an Argentine delegation led by Jorge Gonzalez, the deputy minister of economy of Argentina, who went to Cairo to discuss agreements on the use of harbors.

== Resident diplomatic missions ==
- Argentina has an embassy in Cairo.
- Egypt has an embassy in Buenos Aires.

== See also ==
- Foreign relations of Argentina
- Foreign relations of Egypt
