= Egypt–Kenya relations =

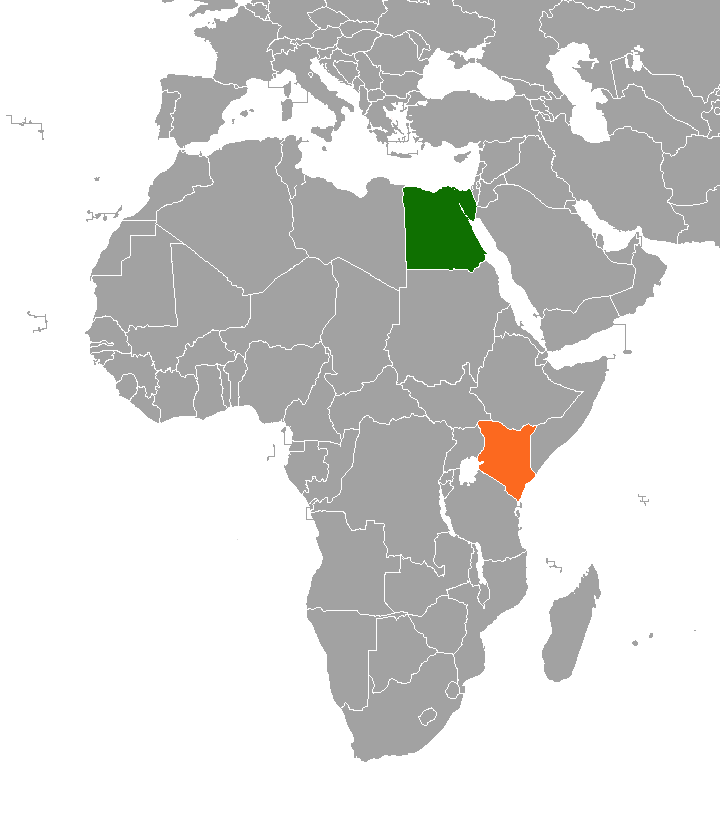
- Egypt: Kenya

Egypt–Kenya relations are bilateral relations between Egypt and Kenya. The two nations primarily maintain trade ties.

== Overview ==
Relations between the present-day territories of Egypt and Kenya began during the colonial period. The Egyptian government under Gamal Abdel Nasser operated a diplomatic and media campaign in support of the Kenyan Mau Mau movement against the British authorities in Kenya. A radio channel, "the voice of Africa", was also broadcast from Egypt in Kiswahili to support the Kenyan freedom movement; it was the first station on the continent to air in the latter Bantu language.

In 1964, Kenya opened an embassy in Cairo.

In recent years, tension developed between Egypt and Kenya over Egypt's and Sudan's exclusive allocation of the Nile. In 2010, Kenya and five other nations, including Ethiopia (where the Blue Nile has its source at Lake Tana), signed a River Nile Basin Co-operative Framework agreement. The deal, if ratified by the respective parties' parliaments, will establish a permanent commission to decide on the Nile's water allocation, albeit without consulting Egypt and Sudan.

== Trade ==
Both Kenya and Egypt are part of Common Market for Eastern and Southern Africa (COMESA), Africa's largest trade bloc in terms of the number of member states. COMESA is also part of the Tripartite Free Trade Area.

In 2007, trade between both countries stood at $320 million. The volume of Egyptian exports to Kenya increased by 48.9% to reach $176 million. For the first time in 20 years, the balance of trade was in favour of Egypt with a surplus of $34.4 million.

In 2008, trade was valued at $378.3 million. Trade data indicated that Egyptian exports to Kenya amounted to $156.2 million, while imports from Kenya amounted to $222.1 million with $65.9 million of surplus in favour of Kenya. This unprecedented increase in the value of Kenya's exports to Egypt in 2008 was due to the increase of the volume and value of exports of tea to Egypt, which was ranked as the largest importer of Kenyan tea. As of April 2014, the Egyptian firm Citadel Capital has an 85% stake in Rift Valley Railways, the rail operator for the line running between Mombasa and Kampala. There are likewise numerous Egyptian firms involved in a variety of businesses within Kenya.

== Diplomatic missions ==
Egypt maintains an embassy in Nairobi. Additionally, Kenya has an embassy in Cairo, which is also accredited to Tunisia, Morocco, Eritrea, and Jordan.

Ambassadors of Kenya to Egypt include:

1. Henry N. Mulli (1965–1968)
2. Japheth K. Ilako (1968–1970)
3. Farid M. A. Hinawy (1970–1973)
4. Omar A. Fakih (1973–1977)
5. Raphael M Kiilu (1977–1984)
6. Ochieng Adala (1984–1988)
7. Ali M. Abdi (1988–1996)
8. Mohamed M. Maalim (1996–2003)
9. Mary D. Odinga (2003–2006)
10. Daniel O. Makdwallo (2006–2010)
11. Dave O. Arunga (2010–2014)
12. H.E Otieno Joff Makowenga (2015–present)

== See also ==
- COMESA
- African Free Trade Zone
