= List of international prime ministerial trips made by Matteo Renzi =

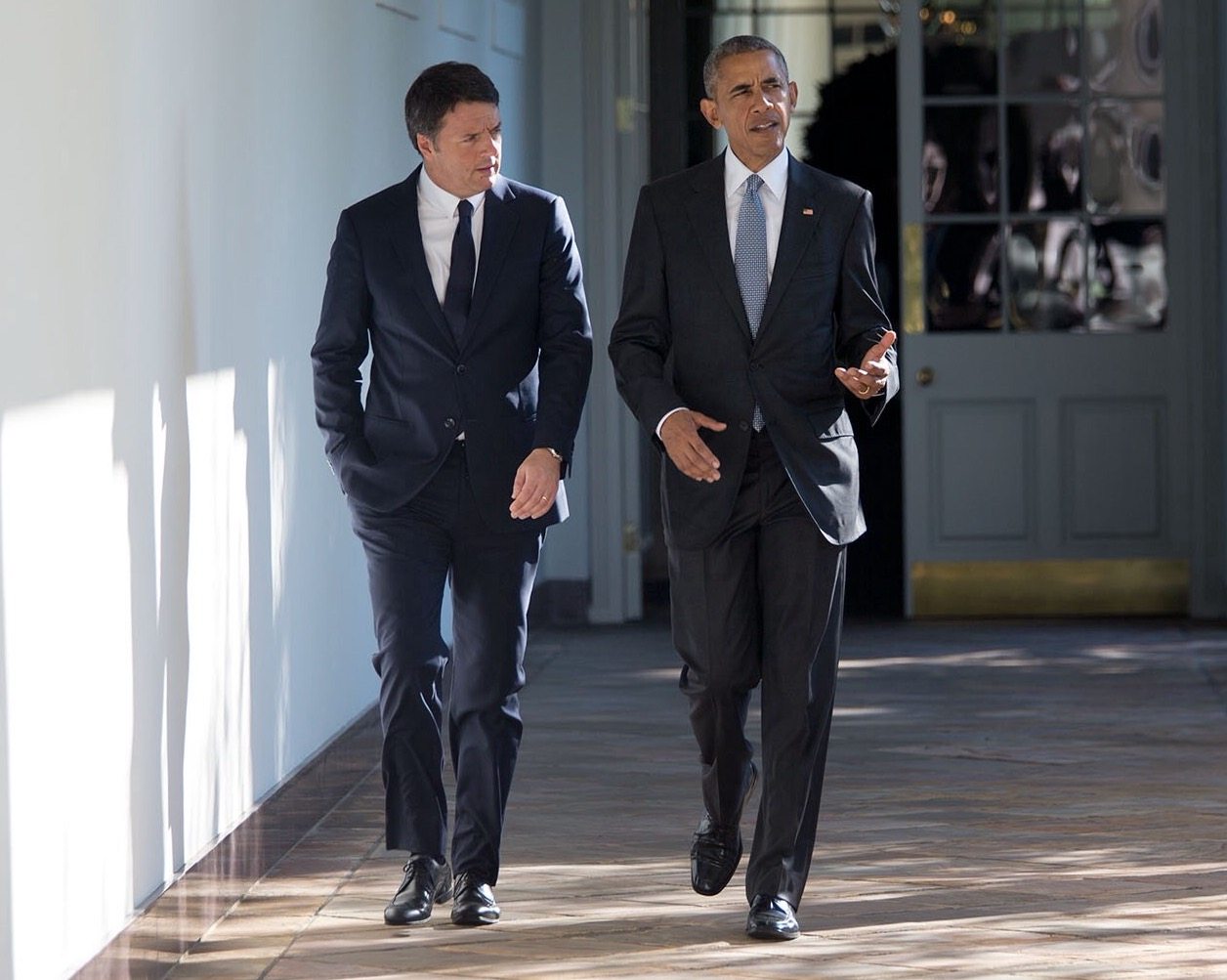
Matteo Renzi with Barack Obama at the White House.

This is a list of international prime ministerial trips made by Matteo Renzi, who served as the 56th Prime Minister of Italy from 22 February 2014 until his resignation on 12 December 2016.

== Summary of international trips ==
Map of international trips made by Matteo Renzi as Prime Minister: Italy 1 visit 2 visits 3 visits 4 visits 7 visits

Number of visits	Country
1 visit	Afghanistan, Albania, Algeria, Angola, Argentina, Australia, Austria, Brazil, Chile, Colombia, Republic of Congo, Cuba, Ethiopia, Ghana, Iran, Iraq, Iraqi Kurdistan, Israel, Kazakhstan, Kenya, Latvia, Lebanon, Luxembourg, Malta, Mexico, Mozambique, Netherlands, Nigeria, Palestine, Peru, Romania, Saudi Arabia, Senegal, Spain, Switzerland, Turkmenistan, Ukraine, United Arab Emirates, Vietnam.
2 visits	Belgium, China, Egypt, Japan, Poland, Russia, Tunisia, Turkey
3 visits	United Kingdom
4 visits	France, Germany
7 visits	United States

== 2014 ==
The following international trips were made by Prime Minister Matteo Renzi in 2014:

Country	Areas visited	Date(s)	Notes
Tunisia	Tunis	4 March	See also: Italy–Tunisia relations Prime Minister Renzi's state visit to Tunisia was his first trip outside Italy as head of the government. He chose Tunisia as the first foreign trip of his premiership in a demonstration of his new foreign policy towards Africa. Renzi met President Moncef Marzouki and Prime Minister Mehdi Jomaa.
France	Paris	15 March	See also: Italy–France relations Renzi's visit to France was his first trip in a country of the European Union. In Paris, Prime Minister Renzi met French President François Hollande.
Germany	Berlin	17 March	See also: Italy–Germany relations Matteo Renzi went to Berlin where he met the German Chancellor Angela Merkel, with whom discussed about the annexation of Crimea by the Russian Federation and the economic policies of the EU.
United Kingdom	London	1 April	See also: Italy–United Kingdom relations Renzi met in London the UK Prime Minister David Cameron, the leader of the Labour Party Ed Miliband and the Mayor of London Boris Johnson.
Belgium	Brussels	4–5 June	Prime Minister Renzi went in Brussels to participate to the 40th G7 summit. The first one after the suspension of Russia from the G8. The main topics where the Pro-Russian protests in Ukraine and the economic crisis.
Vietnam	Hanoi	9–10 June	See also: Italy–Vietnam relations With his wife Agnese Landini, Renzi started his official trip to Asia, from Vietnam. He met President Trương Tấn Sang and Prime Minister Nguyễn Tấn Dũng, as well as Communist Party General Secretary Nguyễn Phú Trọng. In doing so, Renzi became the first Italian Prime Minister to officially visit Vietnam since 1973, when diplomacy first began between Italy and North Vietnam.
China	Beijing	10–12 June	See also: China–Italy relations In Beijing Renzi met Chinese President Xi Jinping in Beijing, who congratulated him for the "important reforms" being undertaken by his government. Xi also stated that China would continue cooperation with Italy ahead of Expo 2015 in Milan.
Kazakhstan	Astana	12 June	Prime Minister Renzi met Kazakh President Nursultan Nazarbayev in Astana, where they discussed withdrawal of Italian troops from Afghanistan.
Belgium	Ypres	26 June	Matteo Renzi visited Ypres for the commemoration of the centenary from the First World War.
Mozambique	Maputo	19 July	Prime Minister Renzi's started a major trip to Africa, meeting the Mozambique President Armando Guebuza, with whom signed economic pacts to create investments by the Italian government-onwned oil company Eni in the African country for 50 billion dollars.
(Republic of the Congo) Republic of Congo	Brazzaville	20 July	Matteo Renzi visited the Republic of Congo where he met President Denis Sassou Nguesso, with whom he signed a cooperation for the extraction of oil in the country.
Angola	Luanda	20 July	Renzi met with Angolan President José Eduardo dos Santos in Luanda; it was the final stage of his trip to Africa.
Egypt	Cairo	2 August	See also: Egypt–Italy relations Matteo Renzi met Egyptian President Abdel Fattah el-Sisi in Cairo, holding talks about a variety of issues, including the Israel-Gaza conflict. Renzi stated that Italy would support the Egyptian truce proposal, with the two leaders calling for an immediate cease-fire and the beginning of peace treaties.
Iraq	Baghdad	20 August	See also: Iraq–Italy relations Renzi met the Head of State Fuad Masum, Prime Minister Haider al-Abadi and his immediate predecessor Nouri al-Maliki to discussed about the insurgency of the Islamic State.
(Kurdistan Region) Iraqi Kurdistan	Erbil	20 August	In Erbil Renzi met the President of Iraqi Kurdistan Mas'ud Barzani and Prime Minister Nechervan Barzani.
United Kingdom	Newport	4–5 September	See also: Italy–United Kingdom relations Prime Minister Renzi participated to the NATO Summit in Newport.
United States	New York City	21–26 September	See also: Italy–United States relations On 22 September, Renzi visited Silicon Valley, California, where he met young Italian emigrants who created startups in the USA. He also visited the headquarters of Twitter, Google and Yahoo! to hold talks with chief executives. Renzi was accompanied by former US Secretaries of State, Condoleezza Rice and George Shultz, and by the former American ambassador to Italy, Ronald P. Spogli. The following day, Renzi spoke at a United Nations summit in New York City, focussing on the problem of climatic change. Following the summit, Renzi met former US President Bill Clinton and his wife, former Secretary of State Hillary Clinton. At the end of his trip, Renzi participated in a reception offered by President Barack Obama.
United Kingdom	London	2 October	See also: Italy–United Kingdom relations Renzi met in London the Prime Minister of the United Kingdom David Cameron.
Romania	Bucharest	13 November	See also: Italy–Romania relations With his wife, Agnese Landini, Renzi met in Bucharest the Prime Minister of the Romania Victor Ponta.
Australia	Brisbane	15–16 November	See also: Italy–Australia relations Matteo Renzi participated with his wife Agnese Landini at the G20 summit in Brisbane. Renzi had also a bilateral meeting with the Australian Prime Minister Tony Abbott.
Turkmenistan	Ashgabat	18 November	In Ashgabat, with Turkmen President Gurbanguly Berdimuhamedow, Renzi signed a number of economic pacts securing increased gas supply.
Austria	Vienna	24 November	See also: Italy–Austria relations Matteo Renzi met the Austrian Prime Minister Werner Faymann in Vienna.
Algeria	Algiers	2 December	Renzi met in Algiers the Algerian President Abdelaziz Bouteflika and Prime Minister Abdelmalek Sellal. With the two leaders of the country, Renzi discussed the Libyan crisis, immigration from North Africa, and also about gas imports from Algeria as an alternative to Russian imports, following the tensions between the European Union and Russia.
Turkey	Istanbul	11 December	See also: Italy–Turkey relations On 11 December Renzi then travelled to Ankara for a second meeting with Erdoğan, during which Renzi expressed his support for Turkish accession to the European Union. On the same day he met Turkish Prime Minister Ahmet Davutoğlu.
Albania	Tirana	30 December	Prime Minister Renzi met in Tirana the Albanian Prime Minister Edi Rama and the President Bujar Nishani.

== 2015 ==
The following international trips were made by Prime Minister Matteo Renzi in 2015:

Country	Areas visited	Date(s)	Notes
United Arab Emirates	Abu Dhabi	8 January	Renzi made his first official trip of the year when he met Crown Prince Mohammed Bin Zayed Al Nahyan in Abu Dhabi to address issues of foreign policy and economic issues such as Alitalia-Etihad. The two leaders discussed joint co-operation domains and enhancing trade exchange and cooperation in the energy and aerospace fields.
France	Paris	11 January	See also: Italy–France relations Matteo Renzi participated, with more than 40 world leaders and three million people, in the Republican March organised by President François Hollande after the Charlie Hebdo shooting.
Switzerland	Davos	21 January	See also: Italy–Switzerland relations Prime Minister Renzi participated to the World Economic Forum in Davos.
France	Paris	24 February	See also: Italy–France relations Prime Minister Renzi participated to a bilateral meeting in Paris with the French President François Hollande
Ukraine	Kyiv	4 March	See also: Italy–Ukraine relations Renzi met in Kyiv the President of Ukraine, Petro Poroshenko; the meeting was focused on the War in Donbass. During the press conference, Renzi stated that: "Italy and the EU will continue to work together to implement the Minsk accord and doing all we can to return to peace with the respect of the integrity and sovereignty of Ukraine."
Russia	Moscow	5 March	See also: Italy–Russia relations Matteo Renzi met Russian President Vladimir Putin and Prime Minister Dmitry Medvedev in Moscow. The talks between the leaders was focused on international issues, such as settlement of the Russo-Ukrainian war, the situations in the Middle East and in Libya, as well as fighting terrorism. Putin guaranteed Russian support in case of a UN intervention in Libya against the Islamic State
Egypt	Sharm el-Sheik	13 March	See also: Egypt–Italy relations Renzi participated to the Egypt Economic Development Conference with the President Abdel Fattah el-Sisi.
Tunisia	Tunis	29 March	See also: Italy–Tunisia relations Renzi participated in a march organised by the Tunisian government after the Bardo National Museum attack.
Malta	Valletta	8 April	See also: Italy–Malta relations Matteo Renzi visited Malta, where he met the Prime Minister Joseph Muscat, discussing about the illegal immigration in the Mediterranean Sea.
United States	Washington D.C.	16–17 April	See also: Italy–United States relations At the White House Renzi discussed, with President Obama, about many issues, including Ukraine, Libya and Islamic State. They also talked about Europe's economy, a pending trade pact between the U.S. and Europe, climate change and energy security.
Latvia	Riga	21–22 May	Prime Minister Renzi travelled to Riga to participate in the 2015 Eastern Partnership Summit.
Germany	Schloss Elmau	7–8 June	See also: Italy–Germany relations Prime Minister Renzi went in Schloss Elmau to participate to the 41st G7 summit. The leaders reached amo agreement on CO2 emission and global warming.
Germany	Berlin	1 July	See also: Italy–Germany relations Matteo Renzi met in Berlin Chancellor Angela Merkel. They discussed about the Greek debt crisis and the bailout referendum.
Ethiopia	Addis Ababa	14 July	See also: Ethiopia–Italy relations Renzi visited Addis Ababa where he met the President Mulatu Teshome and Prime Minister Hailemariam Desalegn.
Kenya	Nairobi	15 July	See also: Italy–Kenya relations Matteo Renzi met the Keyan President Uhuru Kenyatta and spoke at the University of Nairobi.
Israel	Tel Aviv, Jerusalem	21–22 July	See also: Israel–Italy relations Prime Minister Renzi had a bilateral meeting with Prime Minister Benjamin Netanyahu and spoke to the Knesset, on the following day.
Palestine	Ramallah	22 July	See also: Israel–Palestine relations Matteo Renzi met the President of the Palestinian National Authority Mahmoud Abbas.
Japan	Tokyo, Kyoto	2–4 August	See also: Italy–Japan relations Renzi had a bilateral meeting in Tokyo with Prime Minister Shinzō Abe and was received at the Japanese Imperial Palace by the Emperor Akihito.
United States	New York City	26–29 September	See also: Italy–United States relations Prime Minister Renzi travelled to New York City to attend the seventieth session of the United Nations General Assembly. In his address, Renzi expressed Italy's support to "politically solve" the Syrian Civil War, as well as to alleviate climate change.
Chile	Santiago	23–24 October	See also: Chile–Italy relations Matteo Renzi met the Chilean President Michelle Bachelet at the presidential palace La Moneda, inaugurating several renewable energy projects promoted by Enel. The Prime Minister spoke also at the University of Chile.
Peru	Lima, Machu Picchu	25–26 October	See also: Italy–Peru relations Renzi visited the sanctuary of Machu Picchu with the Prime Minister Pedro Cateriano. On the following day he went to Lima, where he met the Peruvian President Ollanta Humala.
Colombia	Bogotà	27 October	See also: Colombia–Italy relations Prime Minister Renzi met the President Juan Manuel Santos, promoting new energetic treaties.
Cuba	Havana	28 October	Matteo Renzi became the first Italian Prime Minister to visit Cuba. In Havana he met President Raúl Castro; he was the first G7 leader to visit Cuba after the normalization of relations between Cuba and the United States.
Saudi Arabia	Riyadh	8–9 November	Prime Minister Renzi met the King of Saudi Arabia King Salman, with whom signed lot of economic cooperation pacts between the two countries.
Turkey	Antalya	15–16 November	See also: Italy–Turkey relations Matteo Renzi participated at the G20 summit in Antalya, hosted by President Recep Tayyip Erdoğan; the summit was focused on the fight to the Islamic State of Iraq and Levant.
France	Paris	25 November	See also: Italy–France relations Prime Minister Renzi participated to a bilateral meeting in Paris with the French President François Hollande, focused on the fight to ISIL. It was the first meeting with Hollande, after the November Paris Attack. Renzi had also a lectio magistralis to Sorbonne University.
Lebanon	Shama	22 December	See also: Italy–Lebanon relations Renzi visited the Italian troops in Lebanon, who took part to the United Nations peacekeeping mission UNIFIL.

== 2016 ==
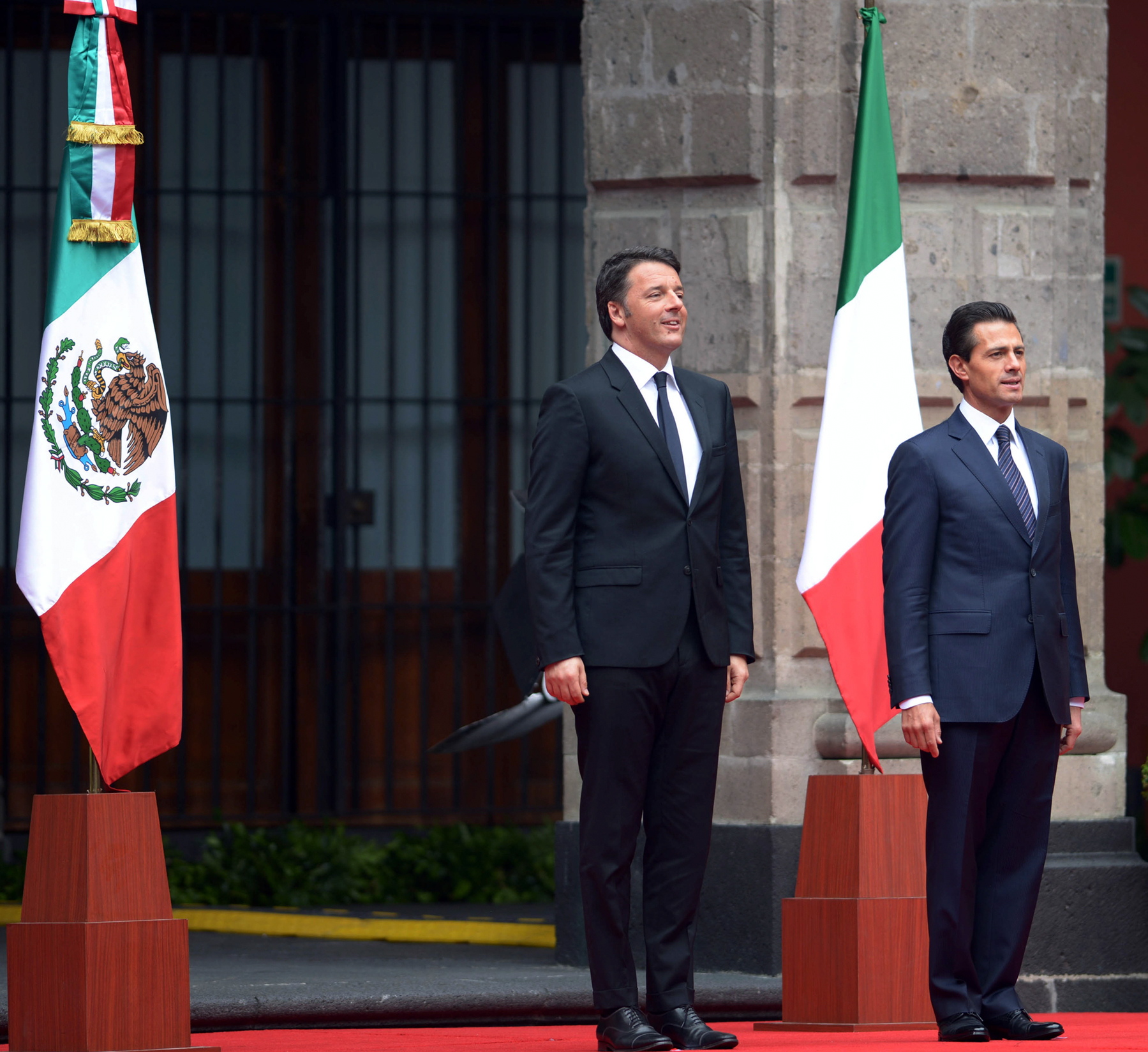
Renzi and Enrique Peña Nieto during an arrival ceremony in Mexico City.

The following international trips were made by Prime Minister Matteo Renzi in 2016:

Country	Areas visited	Date(s)	Notes
Germany	Berlin	29 January	See also: Italy–Germany relations Prime Minister Renzi participated to a bilateral meeting in Berlin with the German Chancellor Angela Merkel. The two leaders discussed about the migrant and economic crisis.
Nigeria	Abuja	1 February	Renzi met President Muhammadu Buhari; with whom signed an agreement on enhancing cooperation between the Nigerian and Italian Polices. The two leaders also discussed agout terrorism and migration.
Ghana	Accra	2 February	Matteo Renzi met President John Dramani Mahama. The Prime Minister also spoke to the Parliament.
Senegal	Dakar	3 February	Prime Minister Renzi met President Macky Sall and Prime Minister Mohammed Dionne. Renzi also spoke at the Cheikh Anta Diop University.
Netherlands	The Hague	5 February	See also: Italy–Netherlands relations Matteo Renzi met the Prime Minister Mark Rutte. They discussed about economic crisis and immigration.
Argentina	Buenos Aires	15–16 February	See also: Italy–Argentina relations Matteo Renzi met the President Mauricio Macri for a state visit to Buenos Aires. He was the first European leader to meet Macri after the 2015 election.
Spain	Tarragona	21 March	See also: Italy–Spain relations Prime Minister Renzi went in Catalonia after a bus accident in which seven Italian girls died.
United States	Stillwater, NV, Chicago, IL, Boston, MA, Washington D.C.	29 March–1 April	See also: Italy–United States relations Prime Minister Renzi visited an Enel plant in Nevada; on the following day he visited an Italian school and Fermilab; then visited IBM's Watson center and Harvard University; on 1 April he participated to the Nuclear Security Summit, where he met President Barack Obama.
Iran	Tehran	12–13 April	See also: Italy–Iran relations Matteo Renzi became the first Western leader to visit Iran after the agreement on Iranian nuclear program. He met both President Hassan Rouhani and Supreme Leader Ali Khamenei.
Mexico	Mexico City	20 April	See also: Italy–Mexico relations Matteo Renzi met the Mexican President Enrique Peña Nieto at Los Pinos residence. He also spoke to the ITAM University.
United States	New York City	21–22 April	See also: Italy–United States relations Prime Minister Renzi signed the COP 21 treaty at the United Nations Headquarters. Renzi also met the former U.S. President Bill Clinton and had a phone call with his wife and current presidential candidate Hillary Clinton.
Japan	Shima	26–27 May	See also: Italy–Japan relations Prime Minister Renzi went in Shima to participate to the 42nd G7 summit. The world leaders discussed about immigration, economic crisis and ISIL terrorist threat.
Russia	Saint Petersburg	17 June	See also: Italy–Russia relations Renzi met President Vladimir Putin, to the World Economic Forum. The two leaders discussed of European migrant crisis, war on ISIL, International sanctions against Russia, Donbass War and Brexit.
Poland	Warsaw	8–9 July	See also: Italy–Poland relations Prime Minister Renzi participated to the NATO Summit in Warsaw. He also had a bilateral meeting with Polish Prime Minister Beata Szydło.
Brazil	Rio de Janeiro, São Paulo	3–6 August	See also: Brazil–Italy relations Matteo Renzi was in Brazil to participate in the opening ceremony of the 2016 Summer Olympics at the Maracanã Stadium. He also visited São Paulo, where he met the Italian community.
China	Hangzhou	4–6 September	See also: China–Italy relations Prime Minister Renzi participated at the G20 summit in Hangzhou, hosted by President Xi Jinping. Renzi also spoke to the Tongji University.
United States	New York City	18–20 September	See also: Italy–United States relations Matteo Renzi travelled to New York City to attend the annual session of the United Nations General Assembly. Renzi discussed with the former U.S. President Bill Clinton at the Clinton Foundation and he also had a bilateral meeting with the Secretary-General Ban Ki-moon. On Tuesday he spoke at the Council on Foreign Relations. Renzi also received from the U.S. Secretary of State John Kerry the Global Citizen Award of the Atlantic Council.
United States	Washington D.C.	17–19 October	See also: Italy–United States relations Prime Minister Renzi and his wife Agnese Landini were welcomed to the White House by President Barack Obama and the First Lady Michelle Obama; they also had a state dinner at the White House. On Wednesday Renzi also spoke at the Johns Hopkins University.
