= Egypt–European Union relations =

European Union–Egypt relations
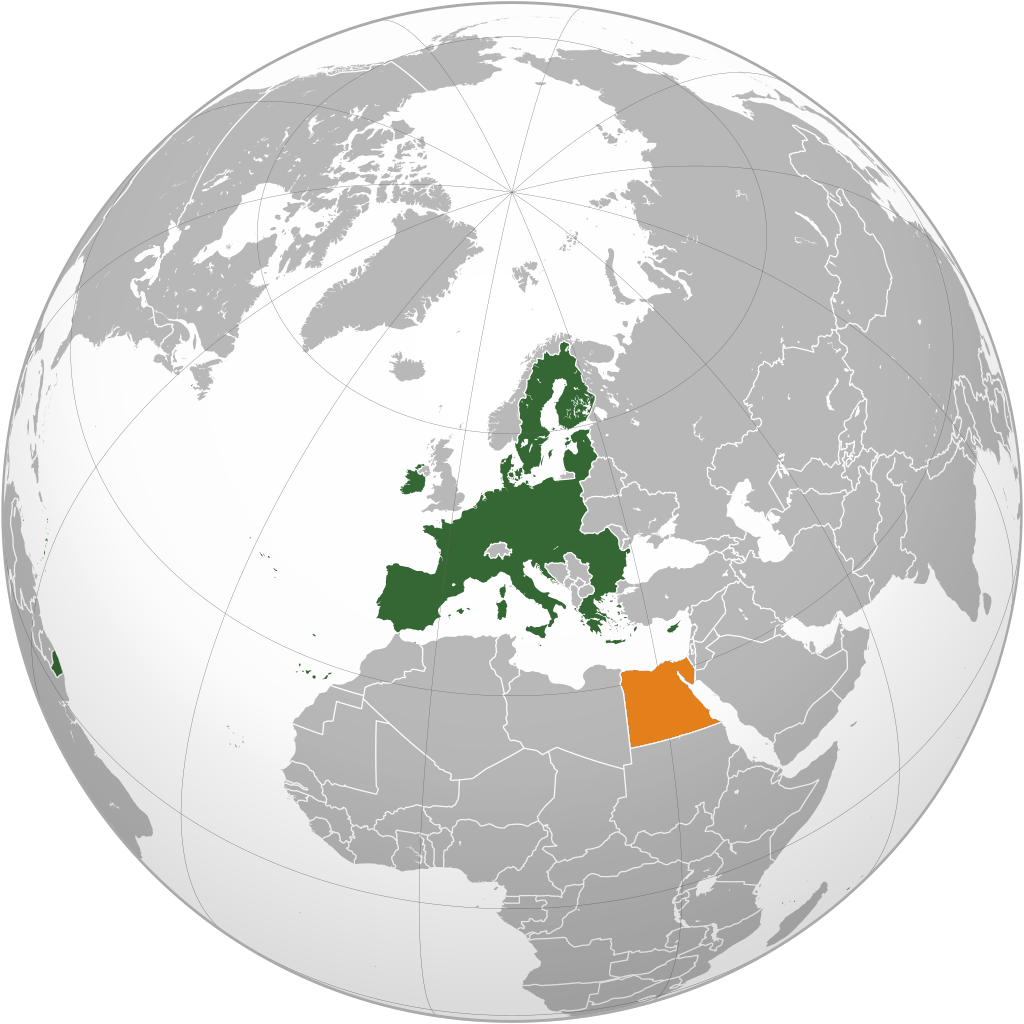
- European Union: Egypt

Envoy
- Ambassador Angelina Eichhorst: Ambassador Ahmed Abu Zeid

Foreign relations between the country of Egypt and the European Union (EU) are framed by the European Neighbourhood Policy (ENP) and the EU-Egypt Association Agreement. Both sides share a common membership in the Union for the Mediterranean which seeks to promote cooperation and dialogue in the Euro-Mediterranean region. Relations between Egypt and the EU focus mainly on strengthening economic ties as well as enhancing regional stability and migration management.

== History ==
Under the aegis of the Global Mediterranean Policy (GMP) launched in 1972, the European Economic Community and Egypt signed an agreement in January 1977, marking the start of the EU pursuing a long-term policy in the Mediterranean.

The framework laid out in the 1995 Euro-Mediterranean Partnership paved the way for some modest advances in the EU–Egypt relations. A new Association Agreement signed on 25 June 2001 entered into force in June 2004 and established a free trade area (FTA) between the EU and Egypt. In 2010, this was extended to include agricultural, processed agricultural and fisheries products. While talks began in June 2013 to establish a Deep and Comprehensive FTA, negotiations are currently on hold. An EU–Egypt Action Plan also entered into force in March 2007, offering a €558 million financial assistance package for the 2007–2010 period to promote a more progressive integration and assist political, economic and social reform.

The outbreak of the Arab Spring in the early 2010s defied the traditional stability-driven policy conducted in the region by the EU. Conveyed by the support of authoritarian rulers in office, including Egypt's Hosni Mubarak, this eventually led to a reassessment of the EU foreign policy in the region.

In 2020, the EU and Egypt celebrated the 25th anniversary of the Barcelona Process. Inspired by this milestone, the EU launched the revised Agenda for the Mediterranean and its Economic and Investment Plan for the Southern Neighbourhood on 9 February 2021 to help foster prosperity and stability in the region as well as strengthen their partnership. In 2023, the European Commission and Egyptian President Abdel Fattah el-Sisi negotiated the creation of a "strategic partnership" between the EU and Egypt. They agreed on an EU funding package of €1 billion in 2024, with the first instalment received by Egypt in January 2025.

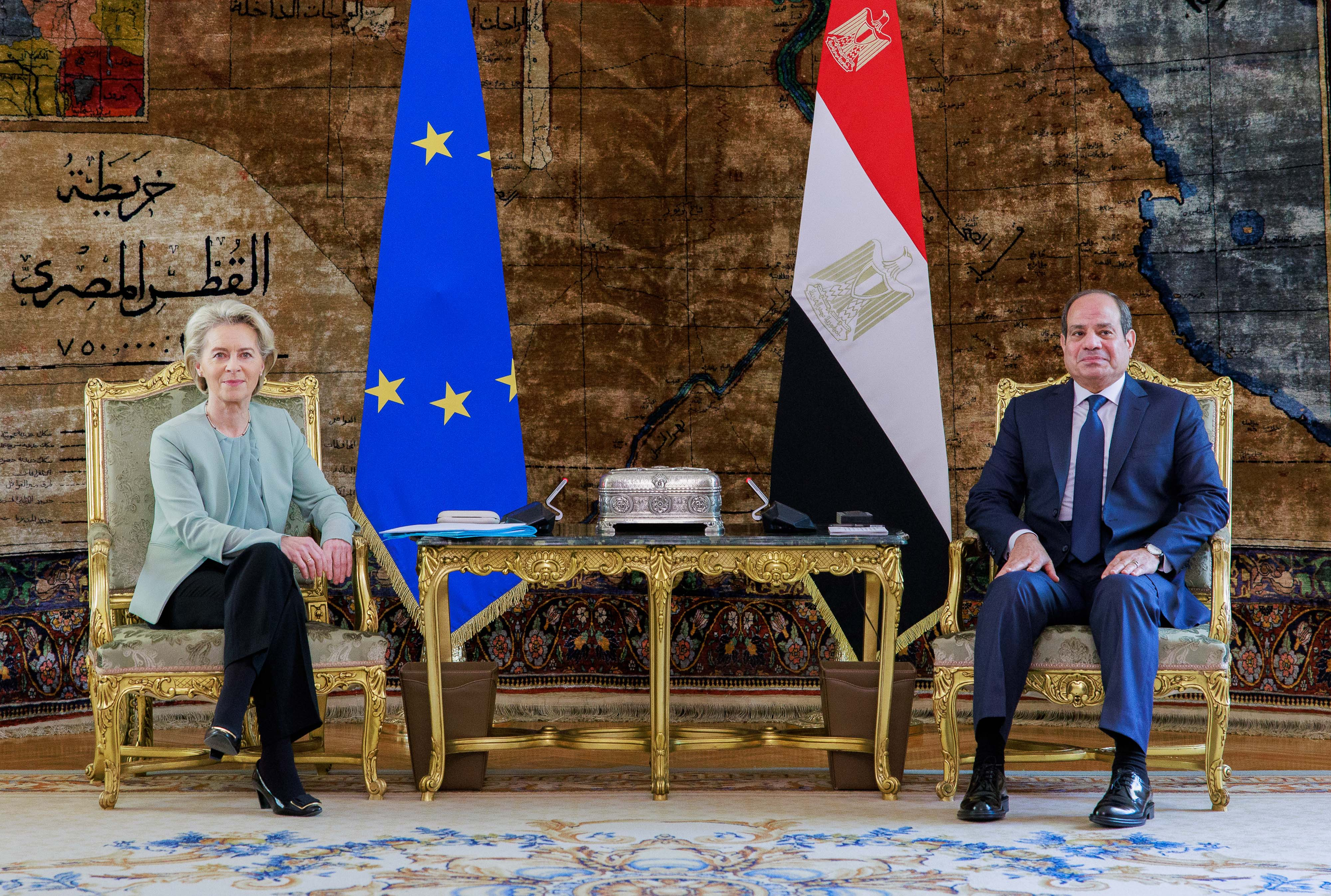
President of the European Commission, Ursula von der Leyen, and Egyptian President Abdel Fattah el-Sisi, in Cairo, 18 November 2023

== Fields of Cooperation ==
=== Trade ===
The EU is Egypt's most important trading partner, making up 25% of the country's trade volume in 2023. In the same year, trade in goods between both sides equalled €26.4 billion. The biggest export categories in 2023 were chemical products and manufactured goods. The EU's biggest service exports to Egypt include telecommunication, transport and various other business services; Egypt's exports to the EU are largely transport and travel services.

=== Culture ===
Egyptian students can participate in the European Commission's Erasmus+ program. Between 2014 and 2022, 6371 Egyptian students, professors and university staff members travelled to Europe while 2980 of their European counterparts travelled to Egypt through the program.

== Chronology of relations with the EU ==
Timeline
Date	Event
11 January 1977	The Cooperation Agreement between the EEC and Egypt enters into force
28 November 1995	The Euro-Mediterranean Partnership launches at the Barcelona Conference
25 June 2001	The EU and Egypt sign an Association Agreement
1 June 2004	The Association Agreement enters into force and establishes a free trade area
March 2007	The European Neighbourhood Policy Action Plan is adopted
June 2013	The EU and Egypt begin negotiations to establish a Deep and Comprehensive FTA
2016	The EU and Egypt initiate a dialogue on future Partnership Priorities in line with the revised European Neighbourhood Policy
9 February 2021	The New Agenda for the Mediterranean & Economic and Investment Plan for Southern Neighbors takes effect
17 March 2024	The EU and Egypt sign a Joint Declaration launching a new Strategic and Comprehensive Partnership

== Egypt's foreign relations with EU member states ==
- Austria
- Belgium
- Bulgaria
- Croatia
- Cyprus
- Czech Republic
- Denmark
- Estonia
- Finland
- France
- Germany
- Greece
- Hungary
- (Republic of Ireland) Ireland
- Italy
- Latvia
- Lithuania
- Luxembourg
- Malta
- Netherlands
- Poland
- Portugal
- Romania
- Slovakia
- Slovenia
- Spain
- Sweden

== See also ==
- Foreign relations of Egypt
- Foreign relations of the European Union
