= Italians in Japan =

Italians in Japan Residenti italiani in Giappone
在日イタリア人 Zainichi Itariajin

Total population
- 5,961 (In December, 2025)

Regions with significant populations
- Tokyo, Osaka, Nagoya, Yokohama, Saitama

Languages
- Italian Japanese

Religion
- Christianity (Catholic), Shinto

Related ethnic groups
- Italians

Italians in Japan (在日イタリア人, Zainichi Itariajin) (Italian: Residenti italiani in Giappone) consists of Italian migrants that come to Japan, as well as the descendants. In December 2025, there were 5,961 Italians living in Japan.

== History ==
The first settlements of Italians began in the 19th century when the Jesuit missionaries came to Japan.

Since the late 20th century, many Italians came to Japan as either students, businessmen or as factory workers. There are also many Italians who work for Italian restaurants; however, many Italian restaurants in Japan are led by Japanese chefs and cooks and some Italians work as assistants for them. The Italian population in Japan is currently increasing due to the popularity of Japanese culture and is one of the fastest growing European community in Japan. There are also many Italian institutions for the Italian community and few Italian language schools for Japanese people.

== Notable people ==
- Namie Amuro, singer, dubbed the "Queen of Japanese Pop"
- Edoardo Chiossone, engraver who worked as foreign advisor in Meiji period
- Kei Cozzolino, racecar driver
- Akira Fantini, footballer
- Antonio Fontanesi, professor at Tokyo Institute of Technology
- Nicola Formichetti, fashion director
- Giulia, professional wrestler
- Jessica Kizaki, AV idol and singer
- Hikari Mitsushima, actress and gravure model
- Shinnosuke Mitsushima, actor

== See also ==
- Italy–Japan relations
- Italian diaspora
- Immigration to Japan
