= Egypt–France relations =

- Egypt: France

Egypt–France relations, also known as Egyptian–French relations, are the bilateral relations between Egypt and France. Relations between the two countries have spanned centuries, from the Middle Ages to the present day. Following the French occupation of Egypt (1798-1801), a strong French presence has remained in Egypt. Egyptian influence is also evident in France, in monuments such as the Luxor Obelisk in Paris. The relationship is also marked by conflicts like the Algerian War (1954-1962) and the Suez Crisis (1956). As of 2020, relations are strong and consist of shared cultural activities such as the France-Egypt Cultural Year (2019), tourism, diplomatic missions, trade, and a close political relationship. Institutions like the Institut d’Égypte, the French Institute in Egypt and the French University of Egypt (UFE) also aid in promoting cultural exchange between Egypt and France.

== History ==
=== Sixteenth century ===
France had signed a first treaty or Capitulation with the Mamluk Sultanate of Egypt in 1500, during the rules of Louis XII and Sultan Bayezid II, in which the Sultan of Egypt had made concessions to the French and the Catalans, and which would be later extended by Suleiman the Magnificent.

=== French occupation of Egypt ===
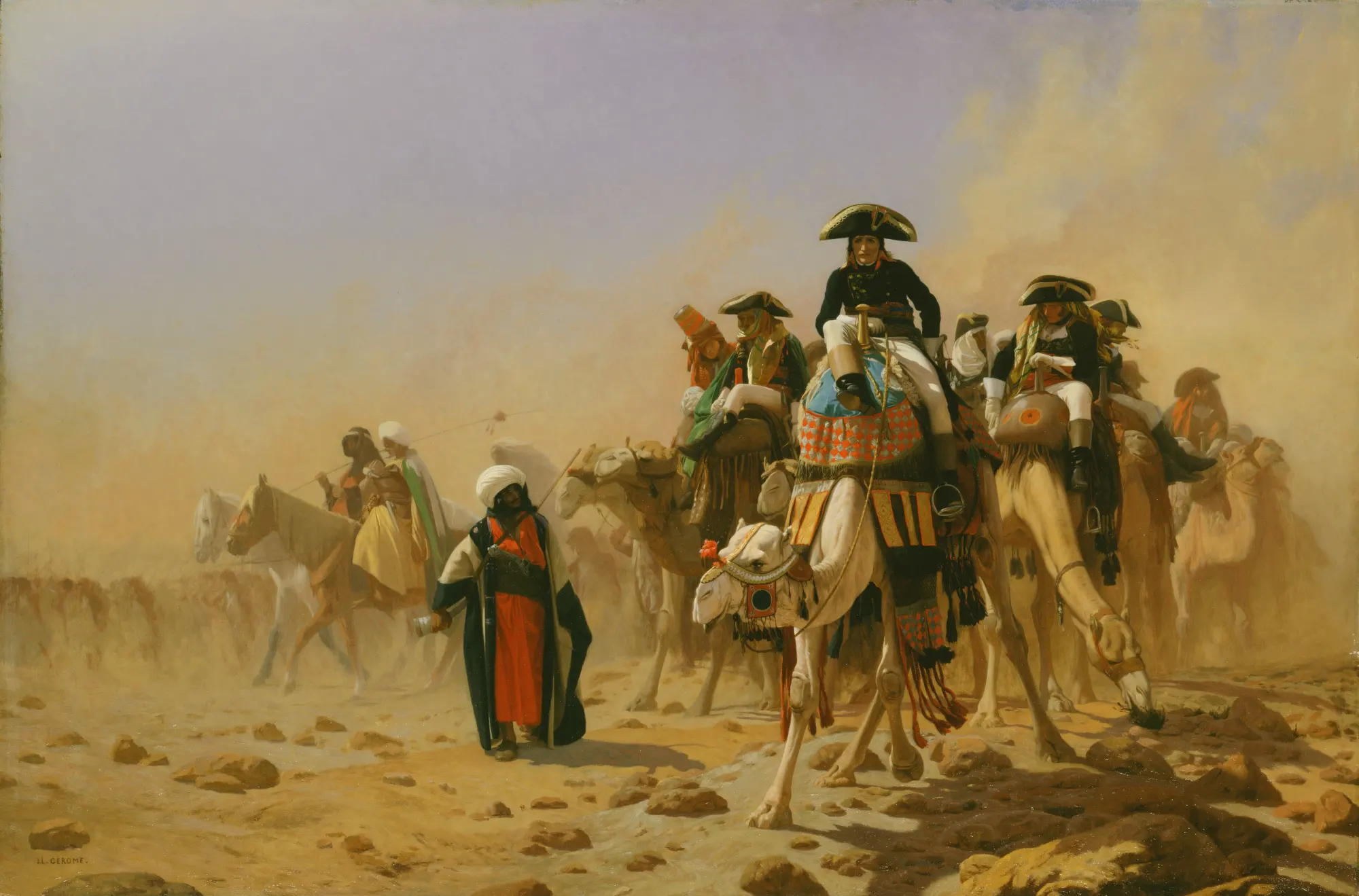
Painting by Jean-Léon Gérôme depicting Napoleon in Egypt (1867)

Between 1798 and 1801 Napoleon Bonaparte commanded a French campaign to occupy Egypt. This was possibly due to the unstable political situation in Egypt. The objectives of the campaign were to cut off Britain's trade route to India and to establish French trade in the Middle East. Early in the occupation, the French established mass political and social reforms in Egypt, such as the founding of a new governing body called the Diwan, and reconstructing many of the large cities.

On Napoleon's orders the Institut D’Égypte was created in 1798 as a replication of the Institut National de France, to encourage study of Egypt by French scholars. The Institut D’Égypte published the first newspapers in Egypt, Le Courier de l’Égypte and La Décade Égyptienne.

Following Napoleon's departure from Egypt in 1799, the French occupiers in Egypt became divided into two factions: Republicans favouring withdrawal from Egypt, and Colonialists wanting to maintain the French presence in Egypt. The colonial effort soon collapsed, and by 1801 French forces had abandoned Egypt.

The Rosetta Stone was discovered during French occupation in Egypt in 1799. It was found in the Egyptian city of Rosetta (Rashid). Although accounts of the exact circumstances under which it was found differ, it is generally accepted that French soldiers discovered it by accident while building a fort in the Nile Delta. After Napoleon's defeat, the Rosetta Stone was seized by Britain, under terms of the Treaty of Alexandria in 1801. It is now housed in the British Museum in London.

=== Luxor Obelisk ===
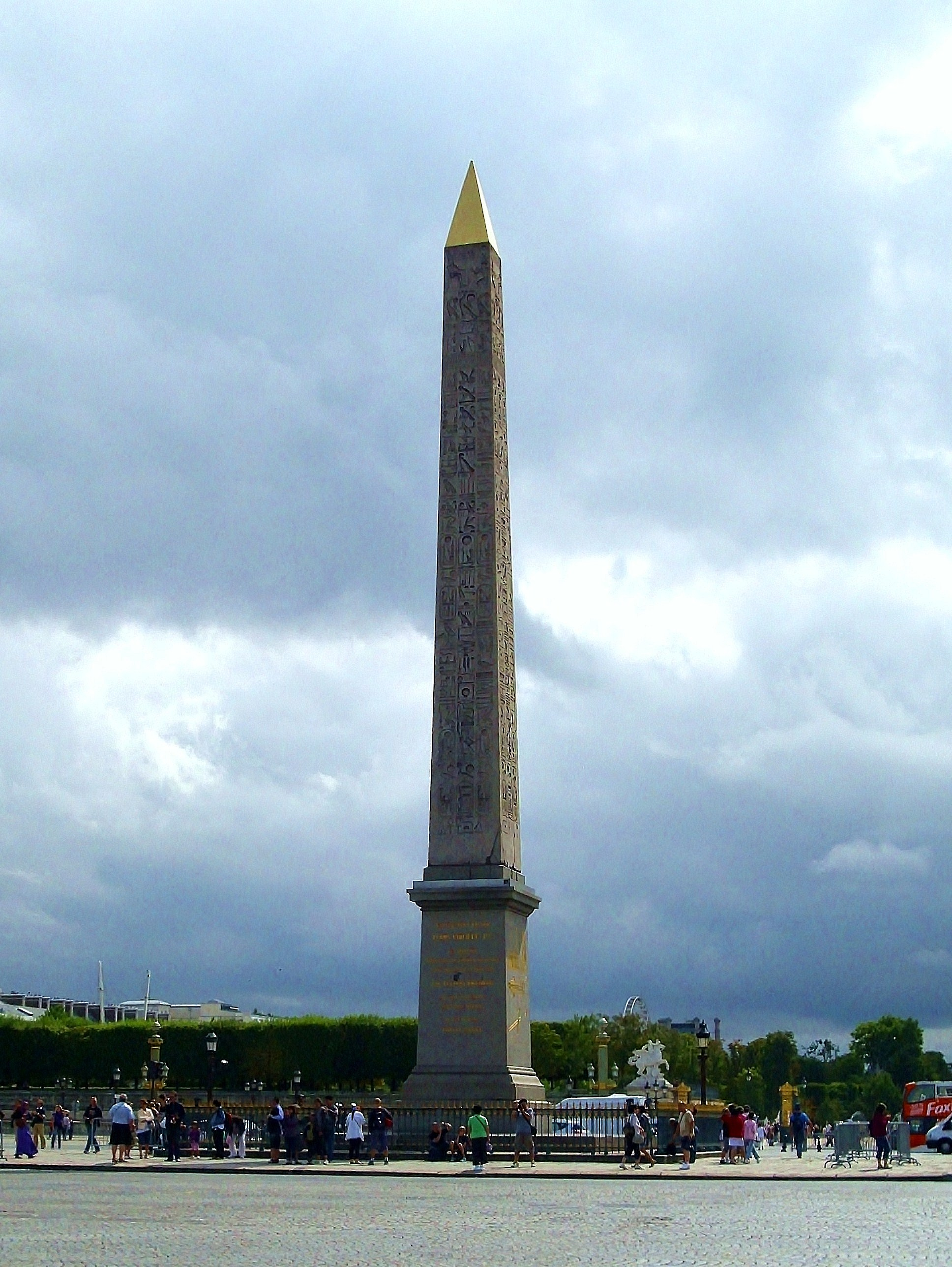
Luxor Obelisk in Place de la Concorde, Paris.

The Luxor Obelisk (Obélisque du Louxor) is an ancient Egyptian obelisk that is situated in the Place de la Concorde in Paris. Over 3,300 years old, the obelisk is inscribed with hieroglyphs that detail the rule of Pharaohs Rameses II and Rameses III. In 1829 it was gifted to France by Muhammad Ali, also known as Mehmet Ali Pesha, the first governor of Egypt. It arrived in Paris in 1833, and was erected in the Place de la Concorde where it still stands. It is made of red granite and is 22.5 metres tall, weighing over 200 tons. It was originally one of two obelisks that stood at the Luxor Temple in the ancient city of Thebes, now Luxor, in Egypt. Its pair remains at the temple there.

=== Levant Intervention and Eastern Question ===
The Syrian War involved Egypt’s attempt to assert independence from the Ottoman Empire, with Kingdom of France, under Louis-Philippe I, initially maintained a non-interventionist stance, tacitly supporting Muhammad Ali diplomatically against the other European militarily. French diplomacy sought to protect its influence in Egypt and the Near East without engaging in direct military action. This stance contrasted with Britain and its allies, who enforced Egypt’s compliance with the Ottoman Empire, ultimately leading to Muhammad Ali’s agreement to withdraw from conquered territories. However, France face increasingly isolation.

=== Suez Canal ===
In 1858, the Universal Company of the Maritime Suez Canal, or Suez Canal Company, was formed by French diplomat Ferdinand de Lesseps to build the Suez Canal, beginning construction on April 25, 1859. Although Napoleon had originally conceived the idea to build the canal in 1799, the project never came to fruition. The Suez Canal Company was granted permission to construct the canal and operate the canal for 99 years, when its control would be returned to the Egyptian government. Shares in the company were originally divided primarily between French and Egyptian parties, however, the British government purchased Egypt's shares in 1875, resulting in French and British control of the canal.

=== Fashoda crisis, 1890s ===
In the 1875–1898 era, tensions between London and Paris escalated, especially over Egyptian and African issues. At several points, these issues brought the two nations to the brink of war; but the situation was always defused diplomatically. For two decades, there was peace—but it was "an armed peace, characterized by alarms, distrust, rancour and irritation." During the Scramble for Africa in the 1880s, the British and French generally recognised each other's spheres of influence. In an agreement in 1890 Great Britain was recognized in Bahr-el-Ghazal and Darfur, while Wadai, Bagirmi, Kanem, and the territory to the north and east of Lake Chad were assigned to France.

The Suez Canal, initially built by the French, became a joint British-French project in 1875, as both saw it as vital to maintaining their influence and empires in Asia. In 1882, ongoing civil disturbances in Egypt (see Urabi Revolt) prompted Britain to intervene, extending a hand to France. France's expansionist Prime Minister Jules Ferry was out of office, and the government was unwilling to send more than an intimidating fleet to the region. Britain established a protectorate, as France had a year earlier in Tunisia, and popular opinion in France later put this action down to duplicity. Egypt was nominally owned by the Ottoman Empire, but in practice the British made all the decisions and counted it as a major asset regarding control of the route to India, as well as the Sudan and Eastern Africa.

One brief but dangerous dispute occurred during the Fashoda Incident in 1898 when a small body of French troops tried to claim an area in the Southern Sudan. As the same moment as much more powerful British force arrived, purporting to be acting in the interests of the Khedive of Egypt. The French withdrew and Britain took control over the area, and France recognized British control of the Sudan. France had failed in its main goals. P.M.H. Bell says:

Between the two governments there was a brief battle of wills, with the British insisting on immediate and unconditional French withdrawal from Fashoda. The French had to accept these terms, amounting to a public humiliation....Fashoda was long remembered in France as an example of British brutality and injustice."

Fashoda worked to the advantage of both sides, because the French realized that in the long run they needed friendship with Britain in case of a war between France and Germany.

=== Independence Movements in North Africa ===
After World War II, opposition to French imperialism in North Africa grew. The League of Arab States was founded in 1945 with independence of Arab nations as one of its key aims. The Committee for the Liberation of North Africa, an organisation funded by the League of Arab States, established its headquarters in Cairo. In 1947, Moroccan and Algerian nationalists established the Arab Maghrib Bureau in Cairo, with the intent of creating anti-French propaganda. From 1954 to 1962, the Algerian War was fought for Algeria's independence from French rule. During the war, Egyptian President Gamal Abdel Nasser was a strong vocal supporter of the resistance movement and provided military aid to the National Liberation Front (FLN). Egypt supplied the Algerian rebels with military equipment and training soldiers. In 1956, France asked the Security Council of the United Nations to outlaw external aid to the FLN in Algeria. This was targeted towards Egypt's supply of military equipment to Algerian rebels, via a ship that had been intercepted by the French navy.

=== Invasion 1956 ===
Control of the canal was in British hands but in July 1956 it was nationalised by the Egyptian President Gamal Abdel Nasser. Secretly the British, French and Israelis plotted an invasion, despite demands from the United States that no force be used. They invaded and captured the Canal in October 1956. The United States forced them to quickly withdraw, but the Canal was blocked for years. Nasser became a hero in the Arab world, and France and especially Britain suffered global humiliation.

=== Arab Spring ===
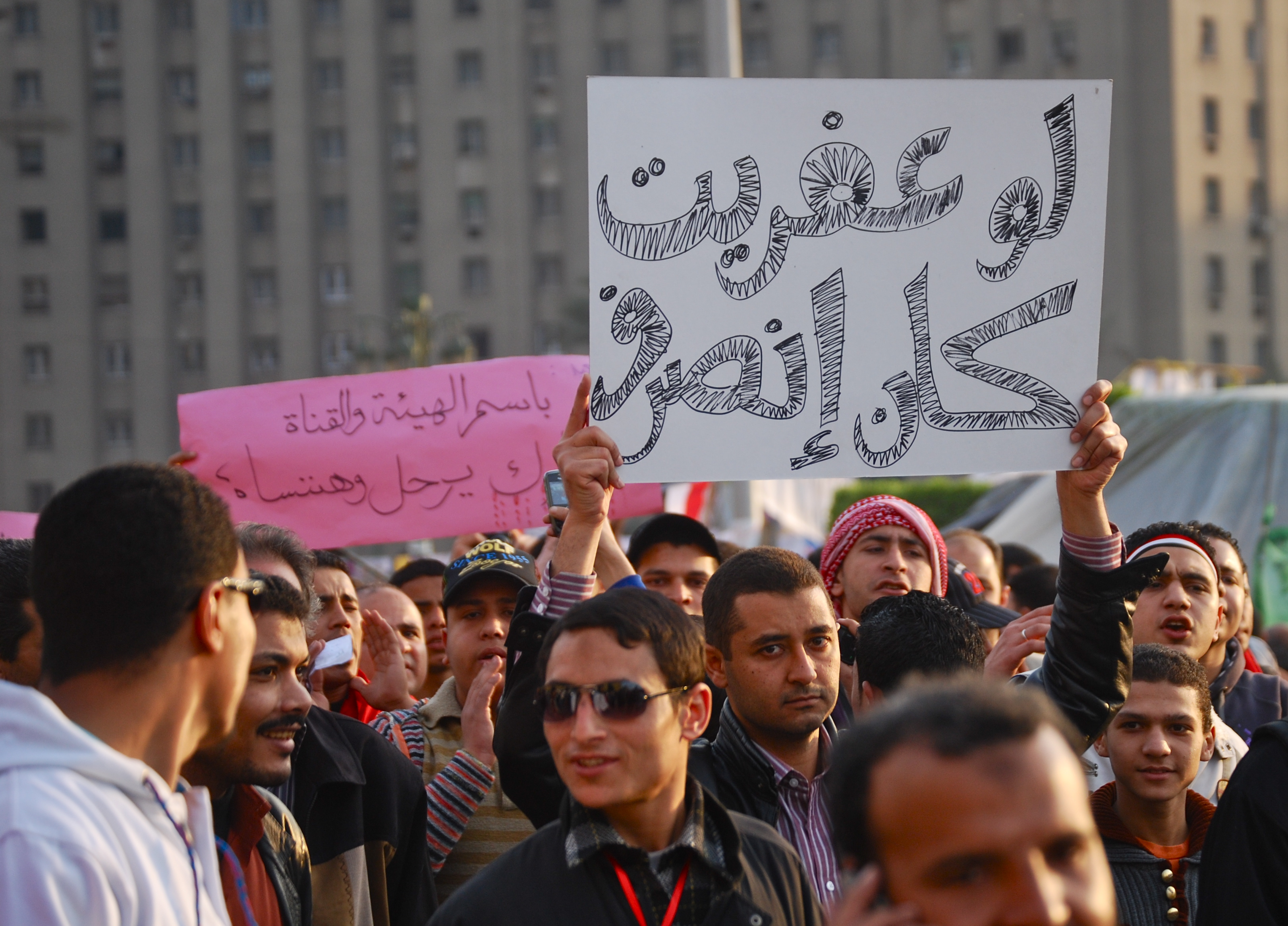
Protestors in Egypt, 2011

In 2010, a series of anti-government protests arose across the Middle East and North Africa, becoming what is known as the Arab Spring. The pro-democracy protests led to the collapse of governments in Tunisia, Libya, Yemen and Egypt. The breakdown of authoritarian governments in the MENA region posed a series of problems to Europe and the United States. For example, the loss of former authoritarian allies, concerns that prices of oil would increase and a fear that an influx of illegal migrants would arrive in Europe from the Middle East.

On January 25, 2011, a series of protests broke out in Cairo, demanding that President Hosni Mubarak leave office. Before the protests broke out, Mubarak was considered a close ally to the United States and Europe. The United States swayed its support between the Mubarak regime and the Egyptian people, before arguing that Mubarak should step down, a sentiment that was soon echoed by France, Germany, Britain, Italy and Spain.

France and Egypt have forged close ties since Abdel Fattah al-Sisi became president in 2014, despite differences over human rights and strong criticism of Egypt by rights activists and some foreign states.

== Cultural relations ==
=== France-Egypt Cultural Year ===
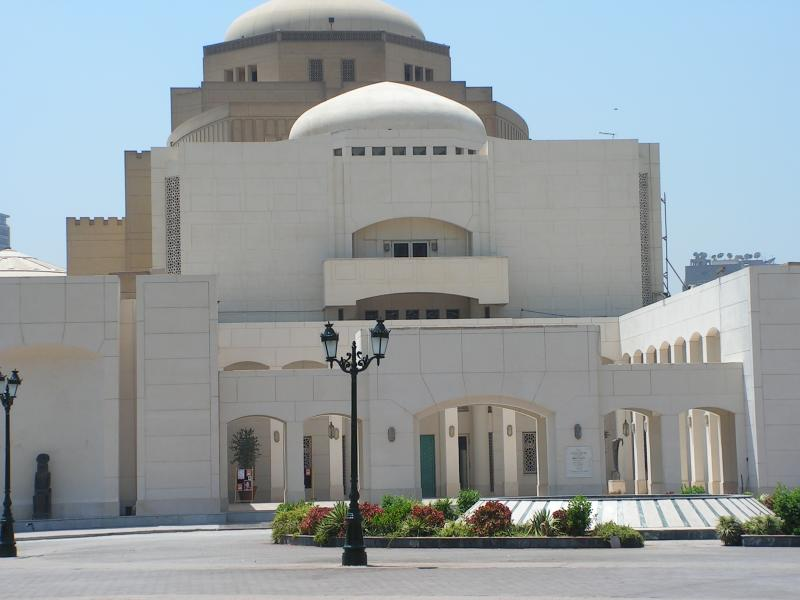
Cairo Opera House

In an effort to promote cultural exchange, 2019 was declared the France-Egypt Cultural Year, celebrating the 150th anniversary of the opening of the Suez Canal and coinciding with French President Emmanuel Macron's official visit to Egypt. The activities of the year were coordinated by the Institut Français in Cairo and the Egyptian Cultural Centre in Paris. The Minister of Culture for Egypt Ines Abdel-Dayem and the French Ambassador to Egypt Stéphane Romatet held a press conference on 8 January to discuss the events of the year. Romatet said that the festivities would contribute to “strengthening the bilateral relations and exchanging the experiences and activities between the two countries in all cultural and artistic fields.” The festivities commenced on 8 January 2019 at the Cairo Opera House with an opening show featuring dancers from the Paris and Cairo Operas. This was the first of four concerts featuring the ‘Independanse x Egypte’ dance show, held at both the Cairo and Alexandria opera houses. The show was choreographed by Grégory Gaillard, including music by Florent Astrudeau, which was inspired by the Nile River. Events were held throughout the year in both Egypt and France and consisted of operas, musical and dance performances, exhibitions of art and historical artefacts, as well as celebrations of French culinary.

=== Tourism ===
In 2019, around 700,000 French tourists visited Egypt. French Ambassador to Egypt Stéphane Romatet stated in 2019 that he is devoted to promoting Egypt in France, saying that he believes that numbers of French tourists travelling to Egypt will increase in 2020. Egypt was ranked the world's 4th fastest growing tourism destination in 2019.

== Diplomatic relations ==
Egypt is represented in France through the Egyptian Embassy in Paris, the Consulate General in Marseille and the Consulate in Paris. From 2016, Ehab Badawy has served as the Egyptian Ambassador to France. France is represented in Egypt through the French Embassy in Cairo, and Consulate-Generals in Cairo and Alexandria. As of 2020, the French Ambassador to Egypt is Stéphane Romatet. Official state visits are frequent between the two countries. In January 2019, French President Emmanuel Macron visited Egypt for an official three-day visit. In August 2019, Egyptian President Abdel Fattah el-Sisi visited France for the G7 Summit. President Sisi also travelled to France for official state visits in 2017.

== Education relations ==
=== The Institut d'Égypte ===
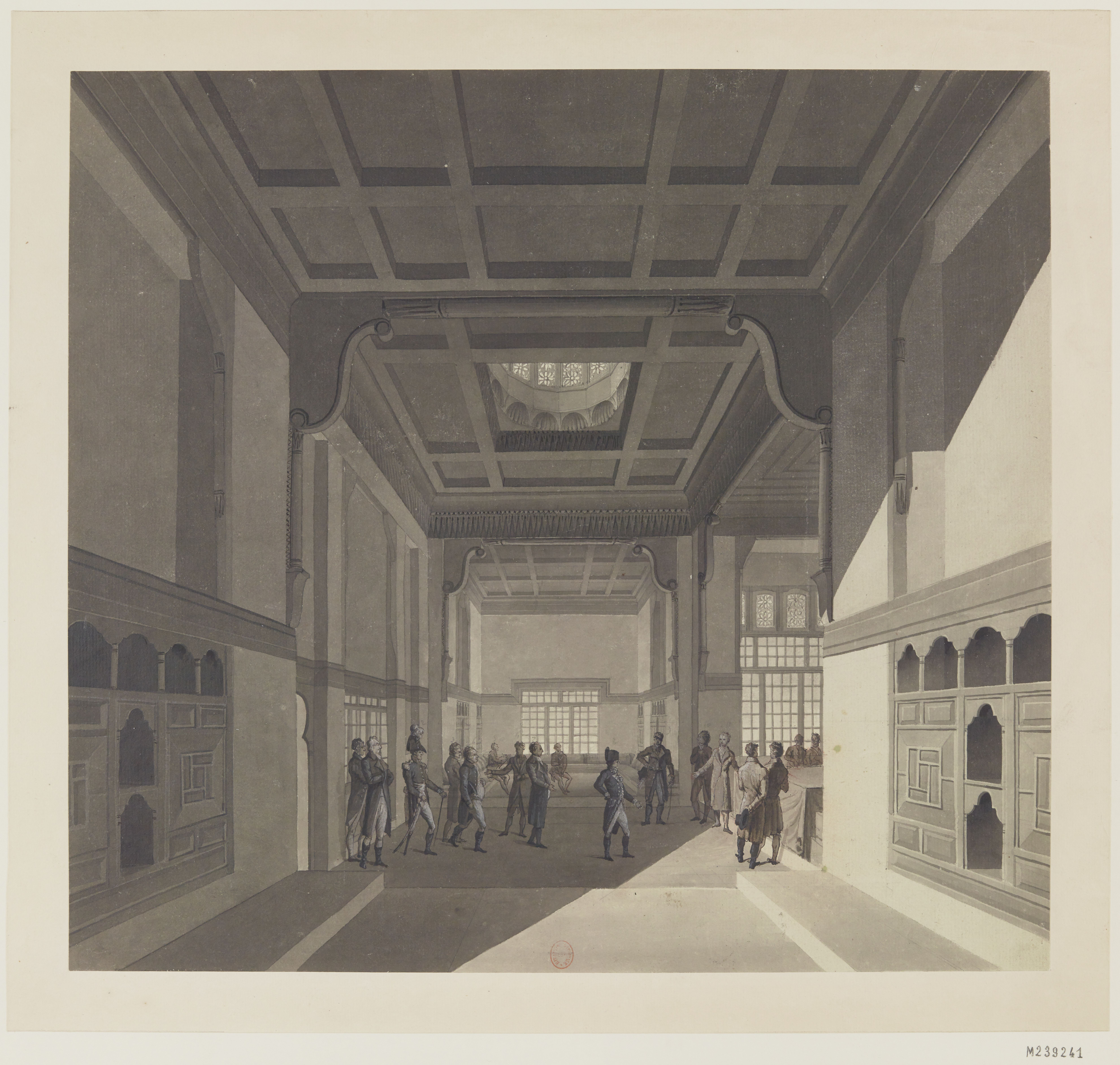
Artwork depicting the Institut d'Égypte by French artist J C Protain c. 1800

The Institut d’Égypte or Egyptian Scientific Institute was established by Napoleon Bonaparte in 1798 to facilitate French scholarship in Egypt. In 2011, the Institute caught fire during protests, and 192,000 books and journals were damaged or lost. This included the 24-volume Description de l’Égypte or Description of Egypt, a handwritten work that contained observations by over 150 French scholars and scientists begun between 1798 and 1801 during French occupation in Egypt. In 2012, the institute was reopened after extensive restoration. Works that had not been damaged in the fire were returned, as well as donated collections. The restored Institute is two levels. The first houses a reading area complete with computers, and the second level comprises lecture and seminar halls, meeting rooms, a lounge for high-profile guests, an event hall and a main hall which includes the library.

=== Institut Français d’Égypte ===
The Institut Français d’Égypte or the French Institute in Egypt was established in 1967. It currently has four branches across Egypt, with three in Cairo (Mounira, Heliopolis and New Cairo) as well as one in Alexandria. A new branch in Sheikh Zayed in Greater Cairo is expected to open in 2020. According to its website, the institute's mission is to "contribute to the influence of French culture, language and expertise in Egypt" and to improve relations between Egypt and France in the areas of education, linguistics, culture, science and technology.

=== Université Française d’Égypte ===
The Université Française d’Égypte (UFE), or the French University of Egypt, was established in Cairo in 2002. It offers courses in Arabic, English and French and encourages students to study overseas in France. The interim President Dr Taha Abdallah described the university as “a private scientific, cultural and professional establishment”.

== Economic relations ==
=== Trade ===
A €5.2 billion deal was signed by the Egyptian administration in 2015 for the purchase of fighter jets, missiles, and a frigate from France. In 2016, Egypt purchased military equipment including fighter jets, warships and a military satellite from France in a deal worth more than €1 billion. In 2017, trade between Egypt and France increased by 21.8%, totalling €2.5 billion after a 27.5% decrease in trade each year between 2006 and 2016 between the two countries. For the fiscal year 2016–2017, France was ranked as Egypt's 11th largest trade partner. According to the French Ministry of Foreign Affairs, French companies have a significant role in the Egyptian economy, in industries such as pharmaceuticals, electrical equipment, tourism and infrastructure.

=== EU-Egypt Agreement ===
A free trade agreement between Egypt and France under the EU-Egypt Agreement has been in force since 2004. The agreement facilitates free trade through the removal of tariffs on industrial goods, and facilitates the trade of agricultural goods.

== Controversies and disputes ==
French President Emmanuel Macron has faced criticism over his promotion of trade relations between the two countries, from the public as well as organisations like Amnesty International. This was in reference to a €5.2 billion deal signed in 2015, in which France sold fighter jets, missiles and a frigate to Egypt. Amnesty International allege that France's supply of arms violates international law, and that the weapons supplied had been used to violently shut down protests. At a joint press conference during Egyptian President Abdel Fattah el-Sisi's visit to Paris in 2017, President Macron was asked to comment on Egypt's alleged abuse of human rights. He said that it was not his place to “lecture” his counterpart on such matters. The matter resurfaced during Macron's official visit to Egypt in 2019, where discussions over human rights again dominated a press conference between him and President Sisi. Macron stated that stability cannot be separated from human rights. President Sisi responded that it was inappropriate to view Egypt and its issues from a European perspective, saying “We are not Europe”.

On 6 December 2020, Amnesty International and International Federation for Human Rights (FIDH) urged French President Emmanuel Macron to press his Egyptian counterpart, Abdel Fattah al-Sisi, to release arbitrarily detained human rights defenders. The request came during President Sisi's three-day state visit to France that started on December 6. In January 2018, Macron had raised human rights concerns, during a visit to Cairo, mentioning "respect for individual freedoms, dignity of everyone and the rule of law".

On February 8, 2024, two NGOs lodged complaints with the European Court of Human Rights, accusing France of providing intelligence assistance to Egypt, resulting in the deaths of civilians. In November 2021, Disclose, a news site, revealed that Egypt utilized French support through the "Sirli" intelligence operation, ostensibly aimed at combating terrorism, to carry out airstrikes on suspected smugglers along the Libyan border. The report further alleged that French forces were implicated in a minimum of 19 attacks on civilians between 2016 and 2018.

== Resident diplomatic missions ==
- Egypt has an embassy and a consulate-general in Paris and a consulate-general in Marseille.
- France has an embassy in Cairo and a consulate-general in Alexandria.

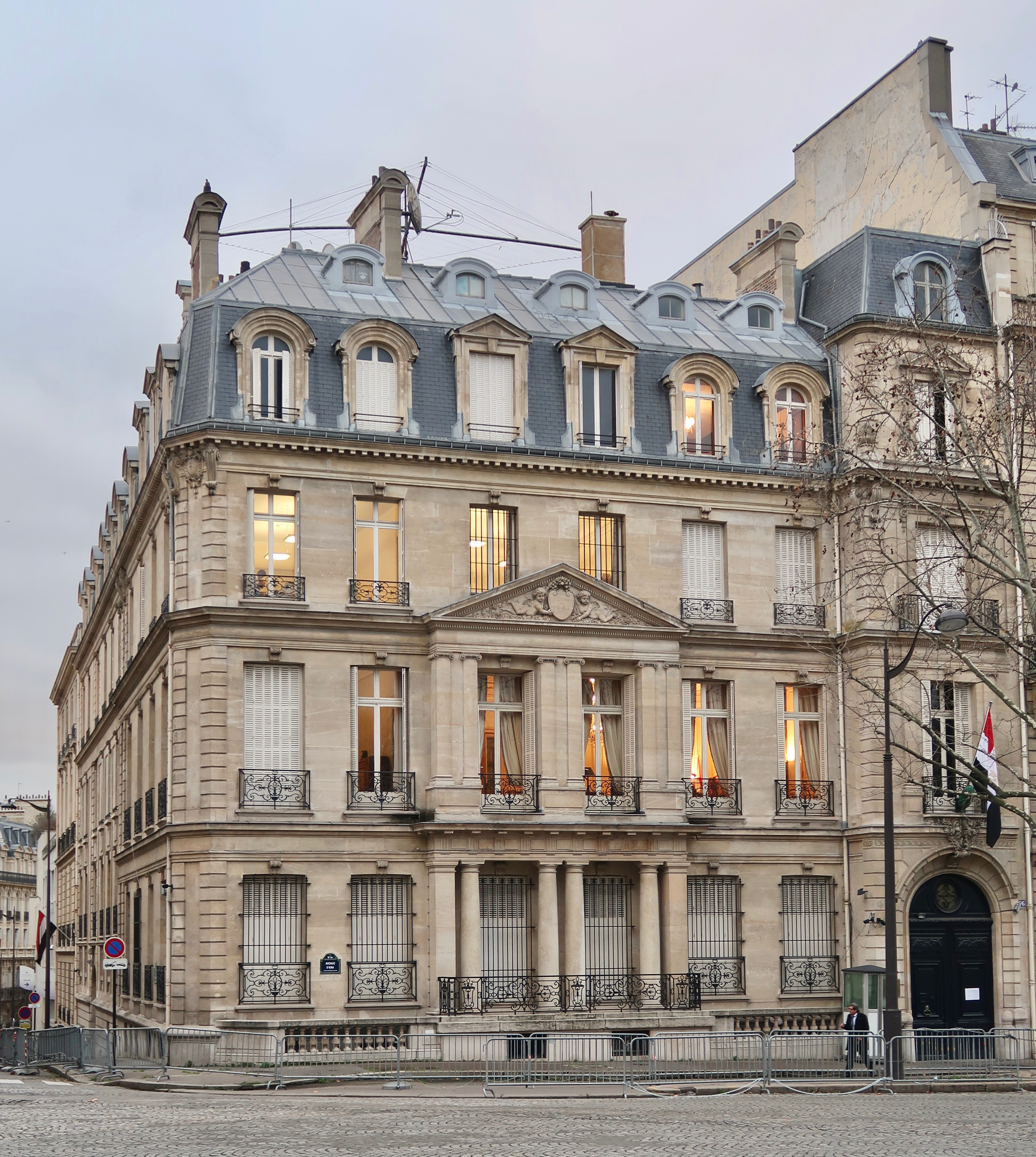
Embassy of Egypt in Paris

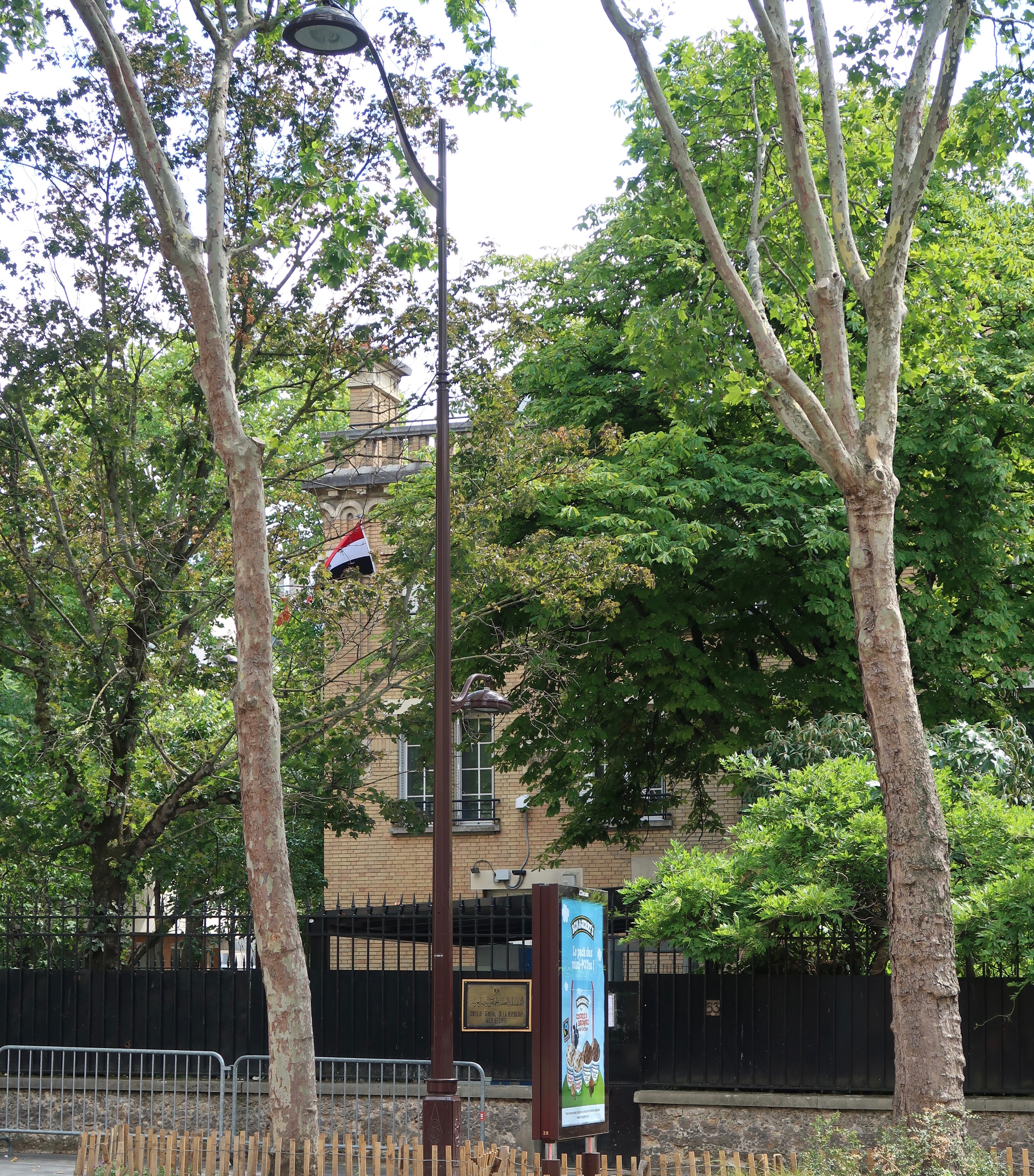
Consulate-General of Egypt in Paris

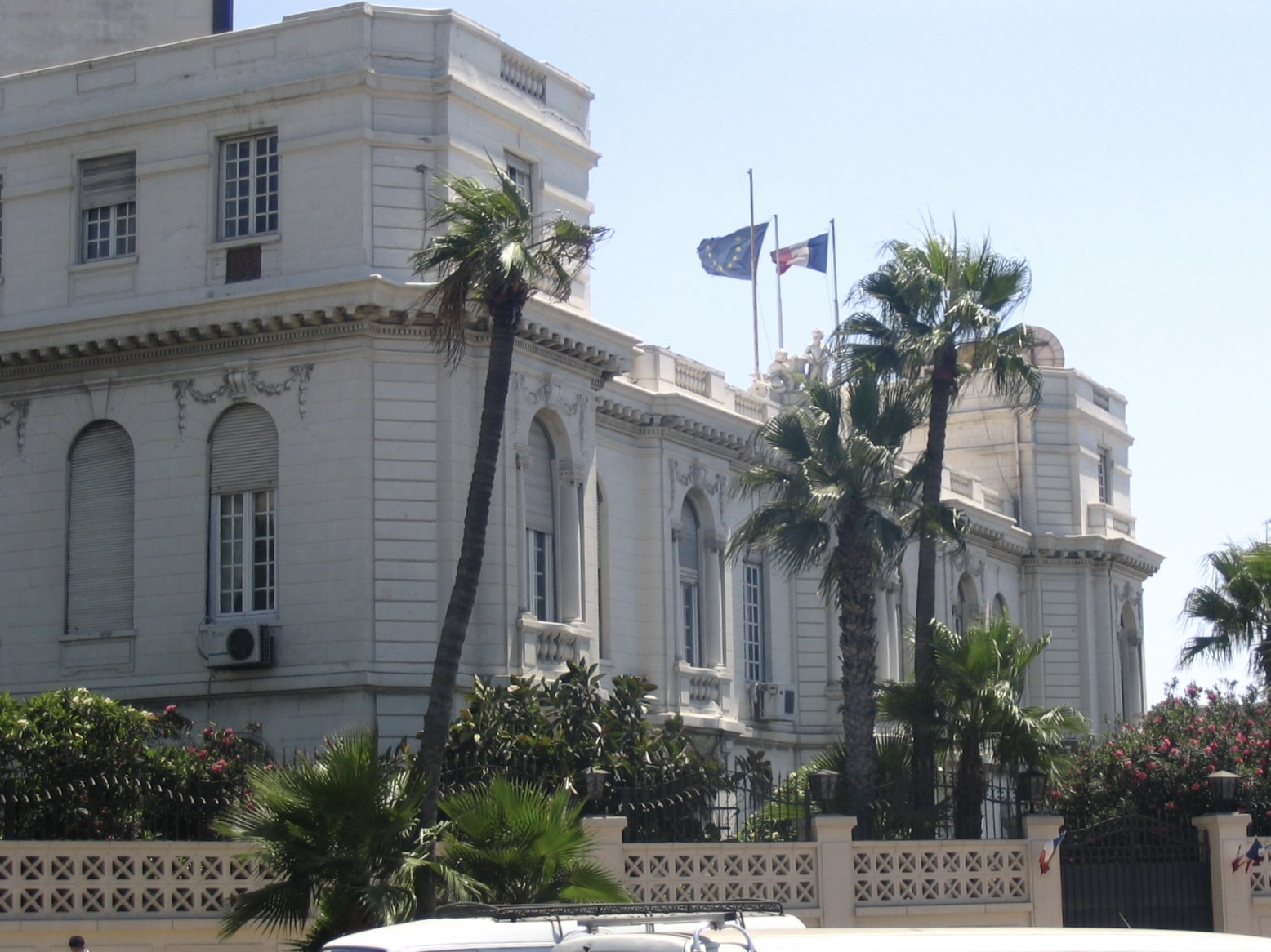
Consulate-General of France in Alexandria

== See also ==
- Foreign relations of Egypt
- Foreign relations of France
- Egypt–European Union relations
