= Egypt–Hungary relations =

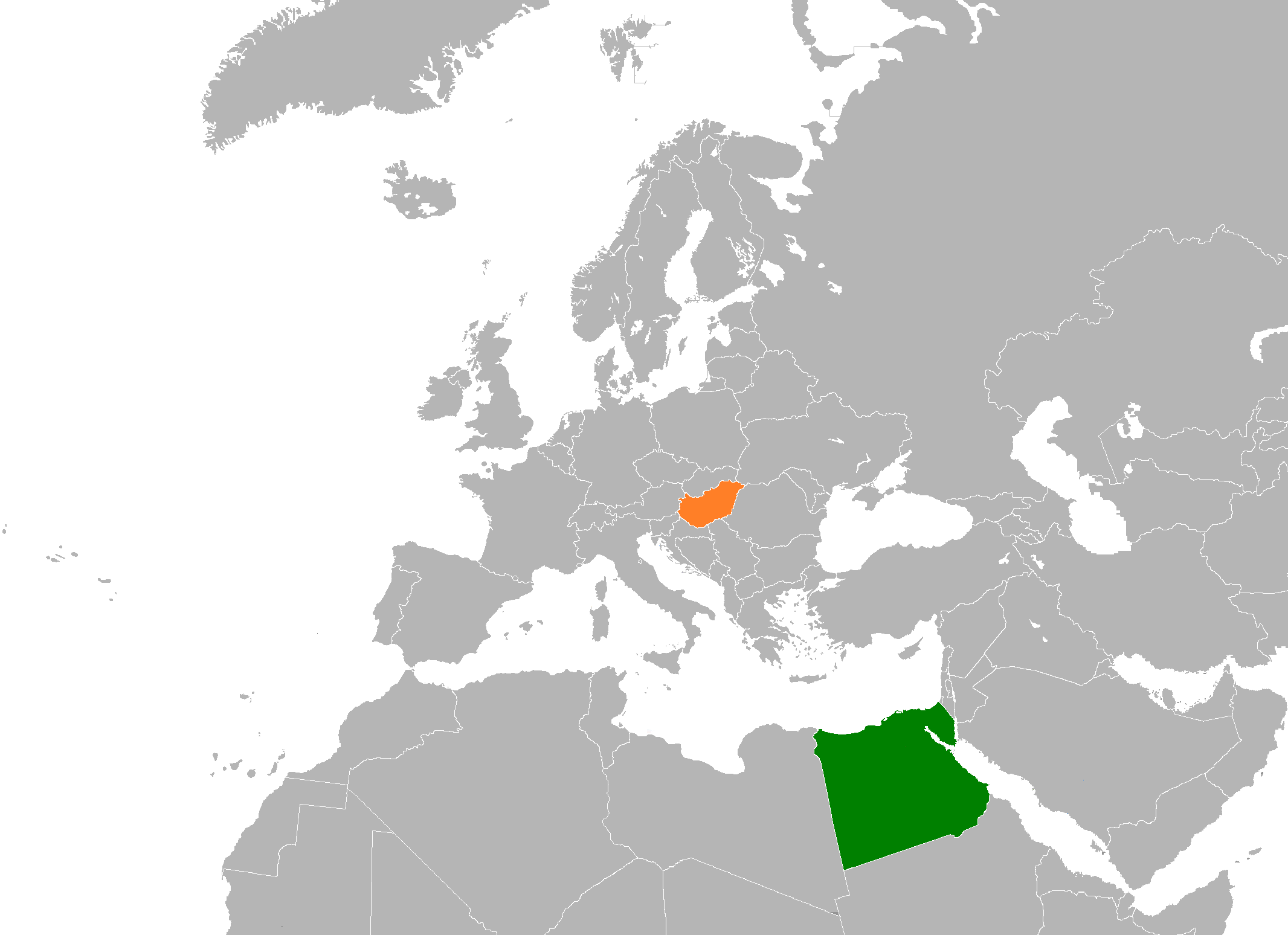

- Egypt: Hungary

Diplomatic mission
- Embassy of Egypt, Budapest: Embassy of Hungary, Cairo

Egypt–Hungary relations refers to bilateral relations between Egypt and Hungary.

== History ==
The two countries first established diplomatic relations in 1929, which were severed during World War II, but restored in 1947 following the war. During the 1956 Hungarian Revolution, Egypt supported the Hungarian government, and Nasser even planned on visiting the country, but was ultimately cancelled due to the Suez Crisis at home. During the 1950s, the two countries also signed agreements for arms shipments, and Hungary supplied weaponry for Egypt during the Yom Kippur War.

In February 2021, the foreign ministers of the two countries met and signed a memorandum of understanding for cooperation between the two foreign ministries, focusing on international development cooperation.

On 16 December 2025, the Egyptian and Hungarian foreign ministers had a phone conversation, where they reiterated their support for UNSC Resolution 2803 and the need to deploy the International Stabilization Force to stabilize the situation in the Gaza Strip in accordance with the Gaza peace plan. They also lauded significant progress in bilateral relations of the two countries, and pledged to deepen economic and trade cooperation and participate in global forums to improve global stability.

== See also ==
- Foreign relations of Egypt
- Foreign relations of Hungary
