= Egypt–Italy relations =

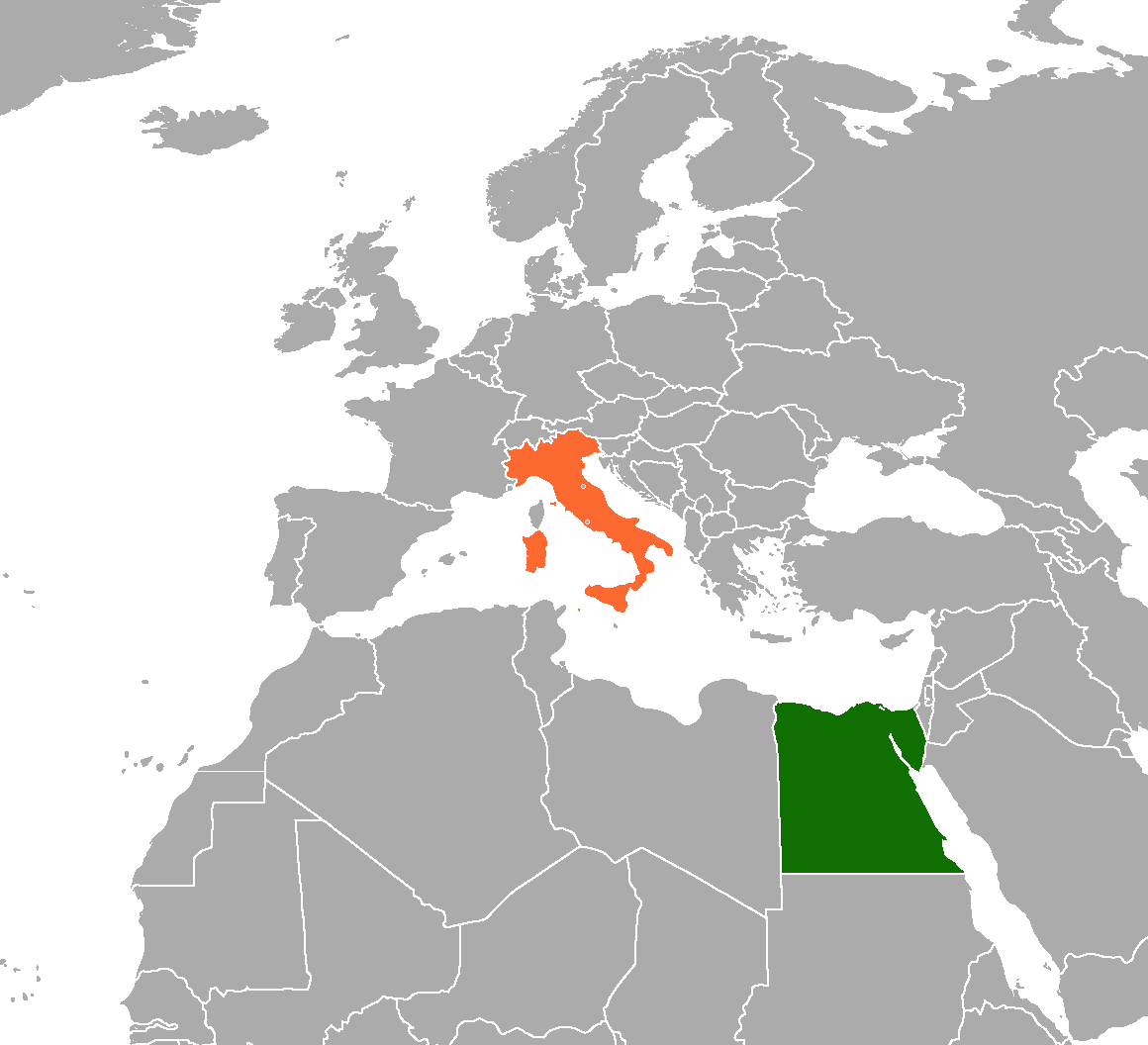
- Egypt: Italy

Diplomatic mission
- Embassy of Italy, Cairo: Embassy of Egypt, Rome

Egypt–Italy relations are the relations between Egypt and Italy. Both nations are members of the Union for the Mediterranean and the United Nations.

== History ==
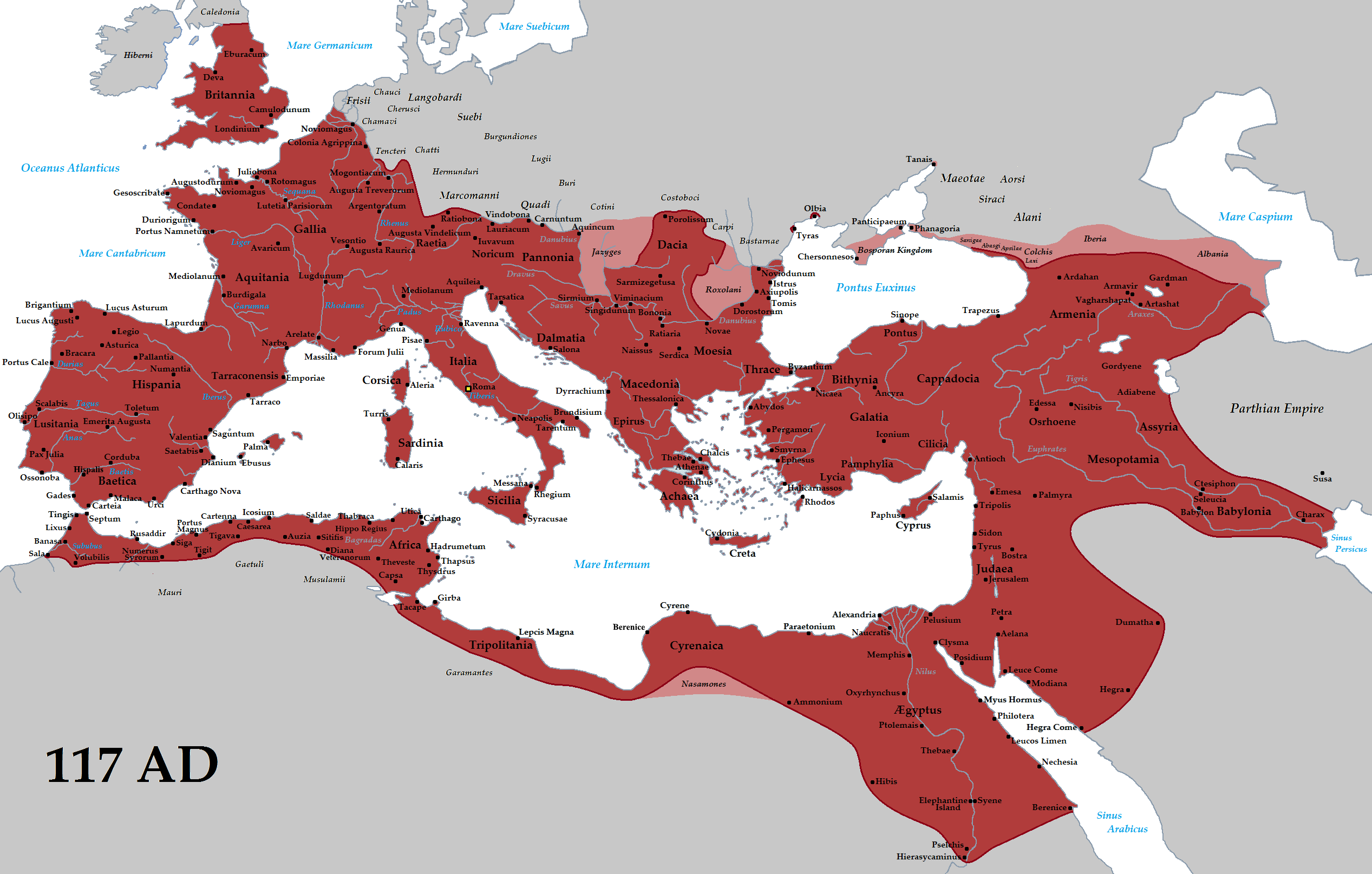
Large areas of Egypt came under the Roman Empire

Relations were first established during the period of the Roman Republic, when the Ptolemaic Kingdom frequently interacted with Rome, culminating in the Roman annexation of Egypt in 30 BC. With the dissolution of the Western Roman Empire in 476 AD and Egypt's continuation as a province of the Eastern Roman Empire until the Islamic conquest in 642 AD, there were no independent states of Italy and Egypt, and as such no diplomatic relations. Cultural ties between Egypt and Italy distanced further over time with the Islamisation of Egypt and the strength of Catholicism in Italy. It would not be until Egypt's official independence from the British in 1922 that relations with Italy would be reestablished. With the rise of Mussolini and fascism in Italy and the eventual Italian invasion of Egypt during World War II, relations became severely strained. However, after the war, relations were re-established and the countries now have a cordial relationship.

== Modern Relations ==
Italy is Egypt's largest trade partner in the European Union, and is the third largest internationally following the United States and China. Furthermore, Italy's investments in Egypt are worth $2.6 billion, mostly concentrated in transport and banking services among other sectors, making it the fifth largest European investor in Egypt. By the end of 2014, the volume of trade between the two countries reportedly reached $6 billion.

In April 2016, diplomatic relations between the two countries were seriously strained when an Italian PhD student from the University of Cambridge was found brutally murdered in Cairo after he went missing in January of the same year. Subsequently, Italy withdrew its ambassador to Egypt for consultations in Rome regarding the criminal death of Giulio Regeni, who, at the time, conducted critical academic research on Egyptian labour rights and trade unions. Egyptian law enforcement then produced conflicting information on the fate of the Italian citizen, which was unacceptable to Italian investigators. As a result, the Italian press and foreign ministry pointed at the systematic human right violations in Egypt, and threatened with political sanctions unless police leadership and practices undergo significant revisions.

The detention of Patrick Zaki, the Egyptian student who is enrolled on an Erasmus Mundus Master's degree at the University of Bologna, has further strained diplomatic relations. He was detained on 7 February 2020 when returning to Cairo to visit family. He has since been detained in Tora Prison despite international calls for his release from organizations such as Amnesty International and Scholars at Risk, as well as the appeals of Italian Members of European Parliament. Several Italian cities, including Bologna, Milan and Naples have made Zaki an honorary citizen as part of the campaign "100 Città per Patrick" (100 cities for Patrick)

== Resident diplomatic missions ==
- Egypt has an embassy in Rome and a consulate-general in Milan.
- Italy has an embassy in Cairo.
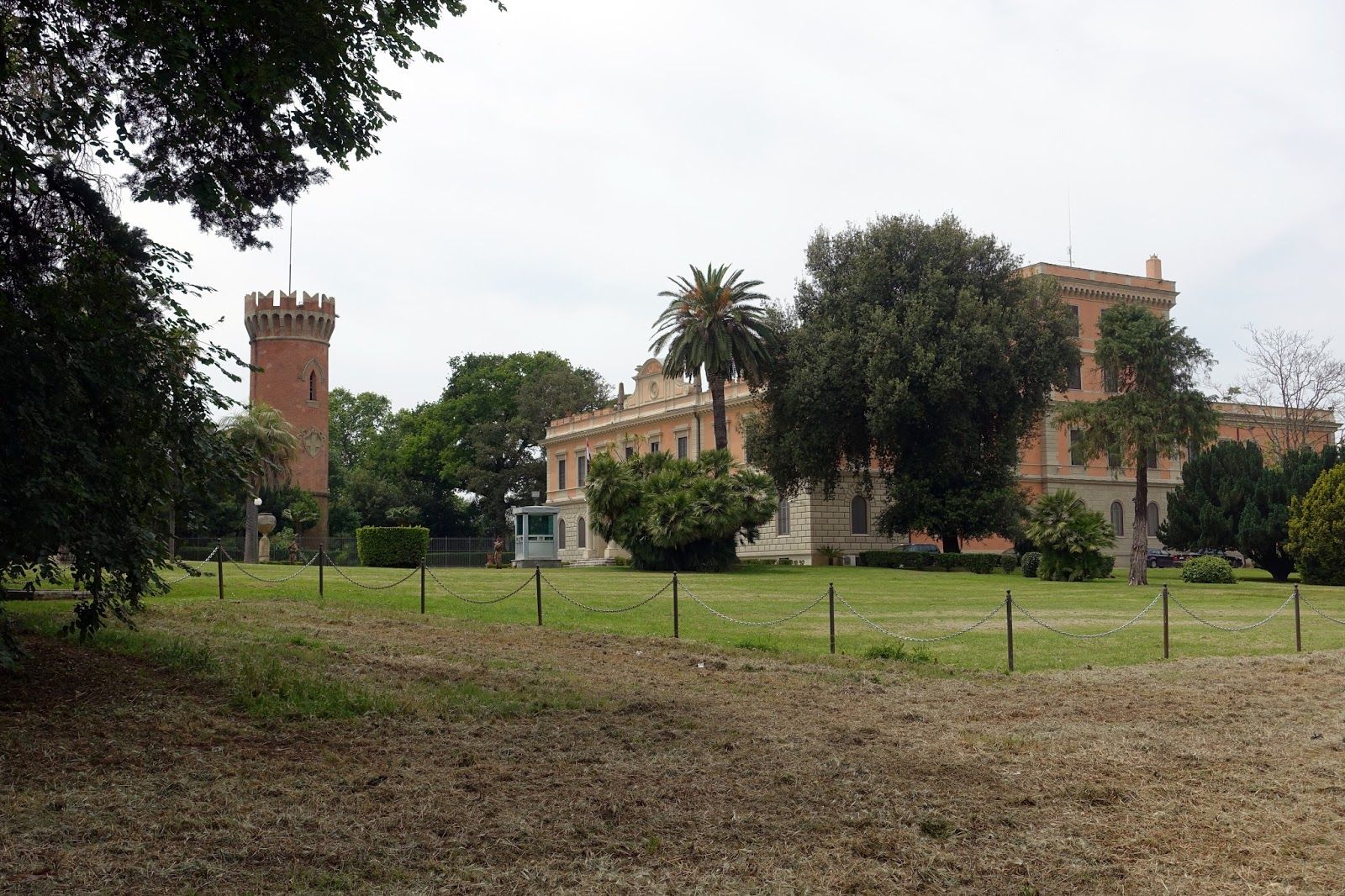
Embassy of Egypt in Rome

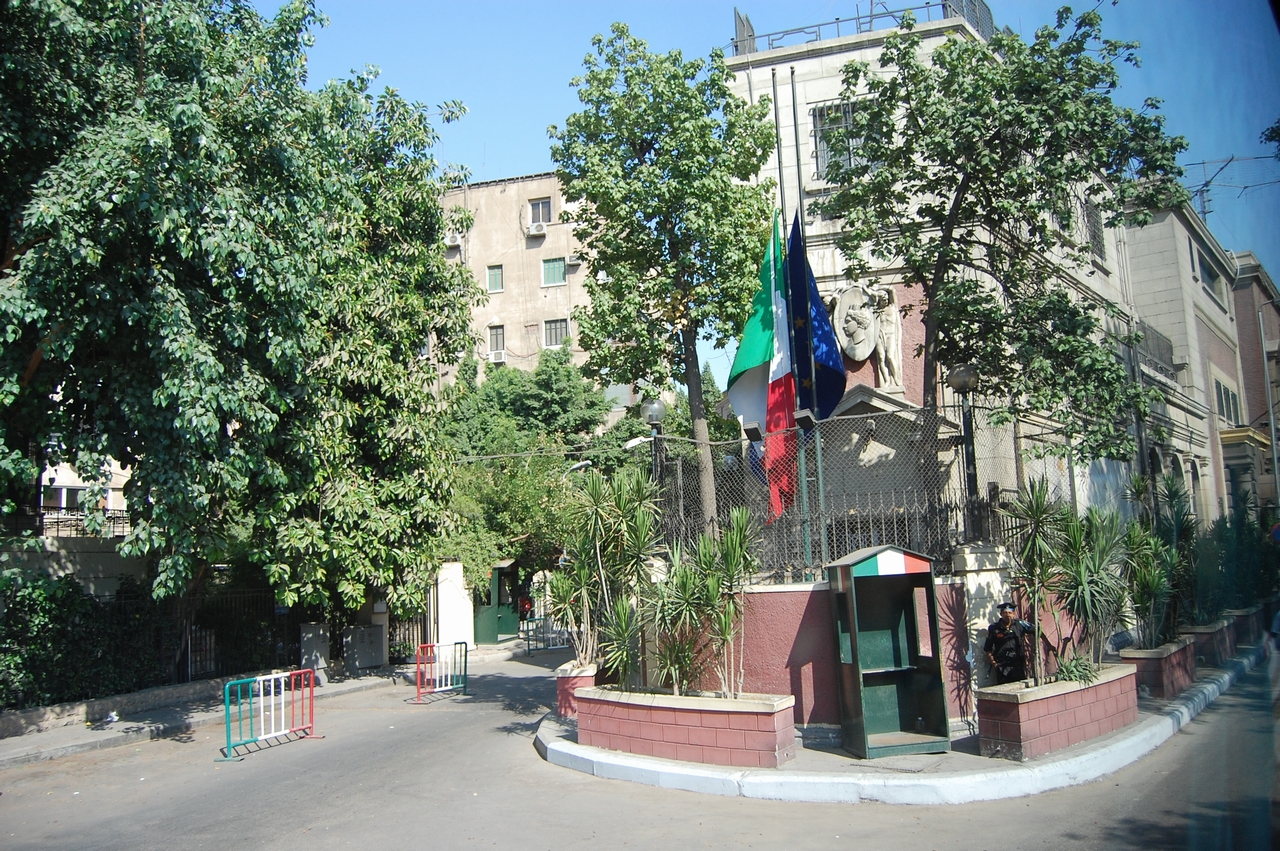
Embassy of Italy in Cairo

== See also ==
- Italian Egyptians
- Egyptians in Italy
- Egypt–European Union relations
