= Agnese Landini =

Italian teacher (born 1976)

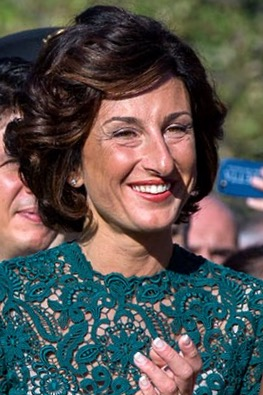
- Born: 11 November 1976 (age 49); Florence, Tuscany, Italy
- Occupation: Teacher
- Known for: Wife of Matteo Renzi
- Spouse: Matteo Renzi (m. 1999)
- Children: Francesco; Emanuele; Ester

Agnese Landini (Italian pronunciation: [aɲˈɲeːze lanˈdiːni, -ɲɛːz-]; born 11 November 1976) is an Italian high school teacher. She's also the wife of former Prime Minister of Italy Matteo Renzi.

== Life and work ==
Landini was born in Florence, in 1976 and has one brother, Filippo, who is a priest. During her childhood, Landini was a scout in the Association of Catholic Guides and Scouts of Italy (AGESCI). In her later years, she met her future husband, Matteo Renzi. On August 27, 1999 Agnese Landini married Renzi, with whom she has two sons, Francesco and Emanuele, and a daughter, Ester. Like her husband, she is a regular Mass-goer.

She is a teacher of Italian literature, Latin and history in a lyceum of Florence.

== Personal life ==
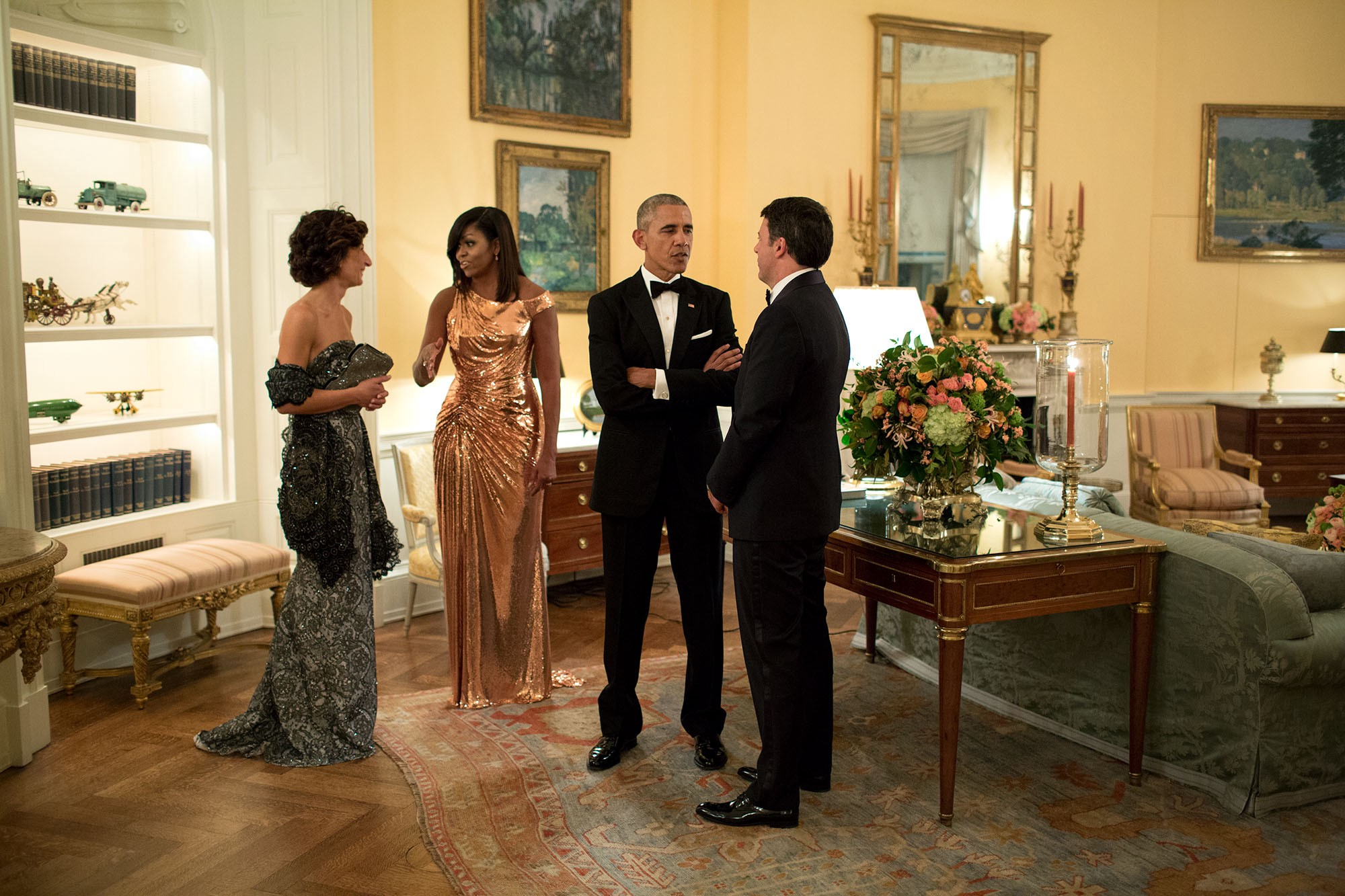
Agnese Landini and her husband Matteo Renzi with Barack Obama and Michelle Obama at The White House, October 2016

Landini enjoys running, like her husband, and reading books; moreover she is a fan of opera and classical music.

When Renzi was nominated Prime Minister and went to Rome to live in the official residence of the Italian prime minister, Palazzo Chigi, she decided to remain in Pontassieve, near Florence, with their children.
