= Italy–Japan relations =

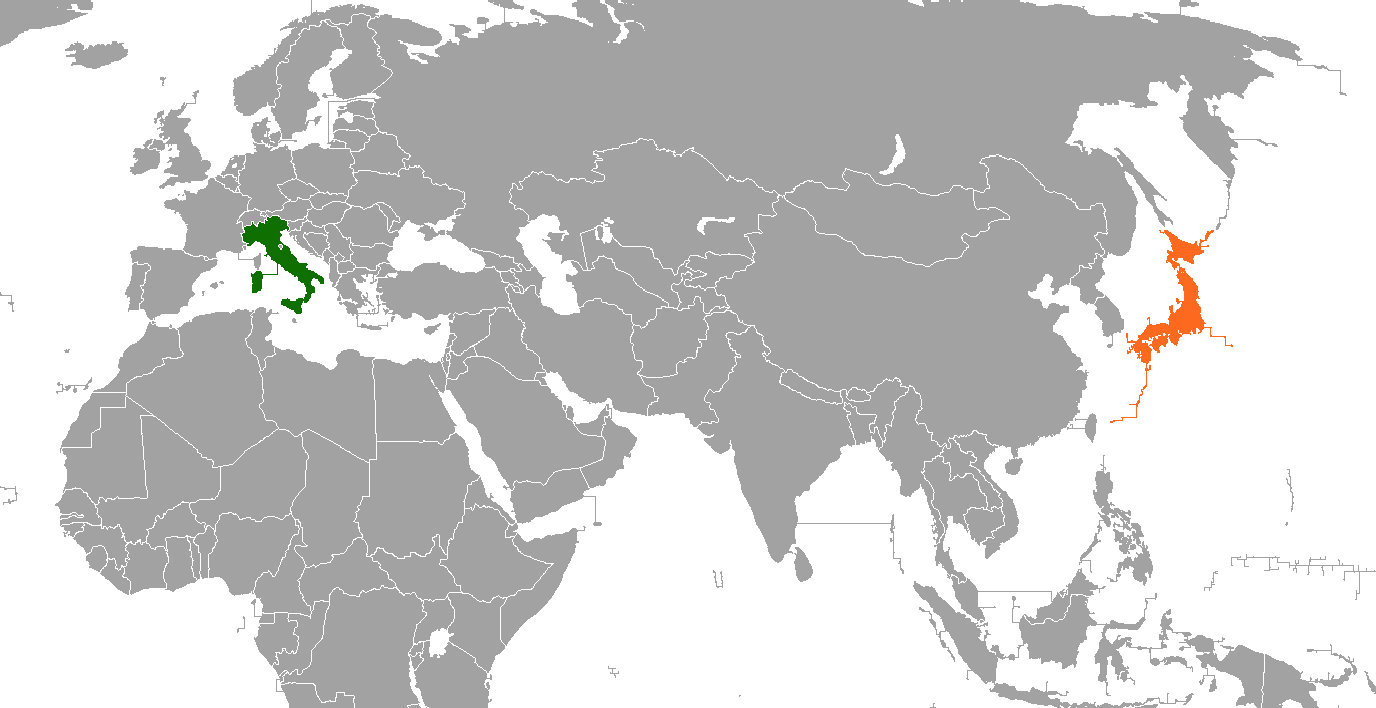
- Italy: Japan

Italy–Japan relations are the bilateral relations between Italy and Japan.

Bilateral relations between Japan and Italy formally began on 25 August 1866, but the first contacts between the two countries date back at least to the 16th century, when the first Japanese mission to Europe arrived in Rome in 1585 led by Itō Mancio.

In the 19th century, Italy and Japan saw great changes in their political and social structure, with the former gaining national unity in 1861 and the latter entering, from 1868, into a process of profound modernization along Western lines that took the name of the Meiji Restoration. In this same period, relations became increasingly close, culminating in the participation of the two countries as members of the Axis in World War II.

Italy has an embassy in Tokyo and a consulate-general in Osaka. Japan has an embassy in Rome and a consulate-general in Milan.

== History ==
=== Early relations from the 13th Century ===
Although relations between Japan and Italy formally began with the signing of the first treaty of friendship in 1866, the first contacts between the two nations can be traced back to the 13th century, when Marco Polo (1254-1324) learned of the existence of Japan, which he called Cipango (or Zipangu). Although he never set foot on Japanese soil, the Venetian navigator described the Japanese country as a large independent island full of riches. He is credited as being the first person to introduce the "island country" into the European imagination.

Japan remained relatively isolated and therefore immune to Western influence at least until 1543, when a Portuguese ship containing Portuguese and Italian Jesuits was blown off course and landed in the Asian country. The Japanese Roman Catholic Christian daimyōs dispatched the Tenshō embassy to Pope Gregory XIII. This was the first Japanese mission in a foreign land on the initiative of the missionary Alessandro Valignano and the Christian daimyō Ōtomo Sōrin, Ōmura Sumitada and Arima Harunobu. The delegation consisted of four young dignitaries: Itō Mancio, Giuliano Nakaura, Martino Hara and Michele Chijiwa, joined by the Jesuit Diogo de Mesquita, who acted as their interpreter.

The group arrived in Italy in 1585 and were received in Rome by Pope Gregory XIII and especially by his successor Pope Sixtus V, who made them a gift of the Church of Santa Maria dell'Orto, which has been the place of worship for the Japanese Catholic community in the Italian capital ever since. In 1615, the daimyō of Sendai, Date Masamune, sent another delegation headed by the samurai Hasekura Tsunenaga. The latter met Pope Paul V, and formally requested a trade treaty between Japan and Mexico (then Viceroyalty of New Spain), as well as the sending of Christian missionaries to Japan.

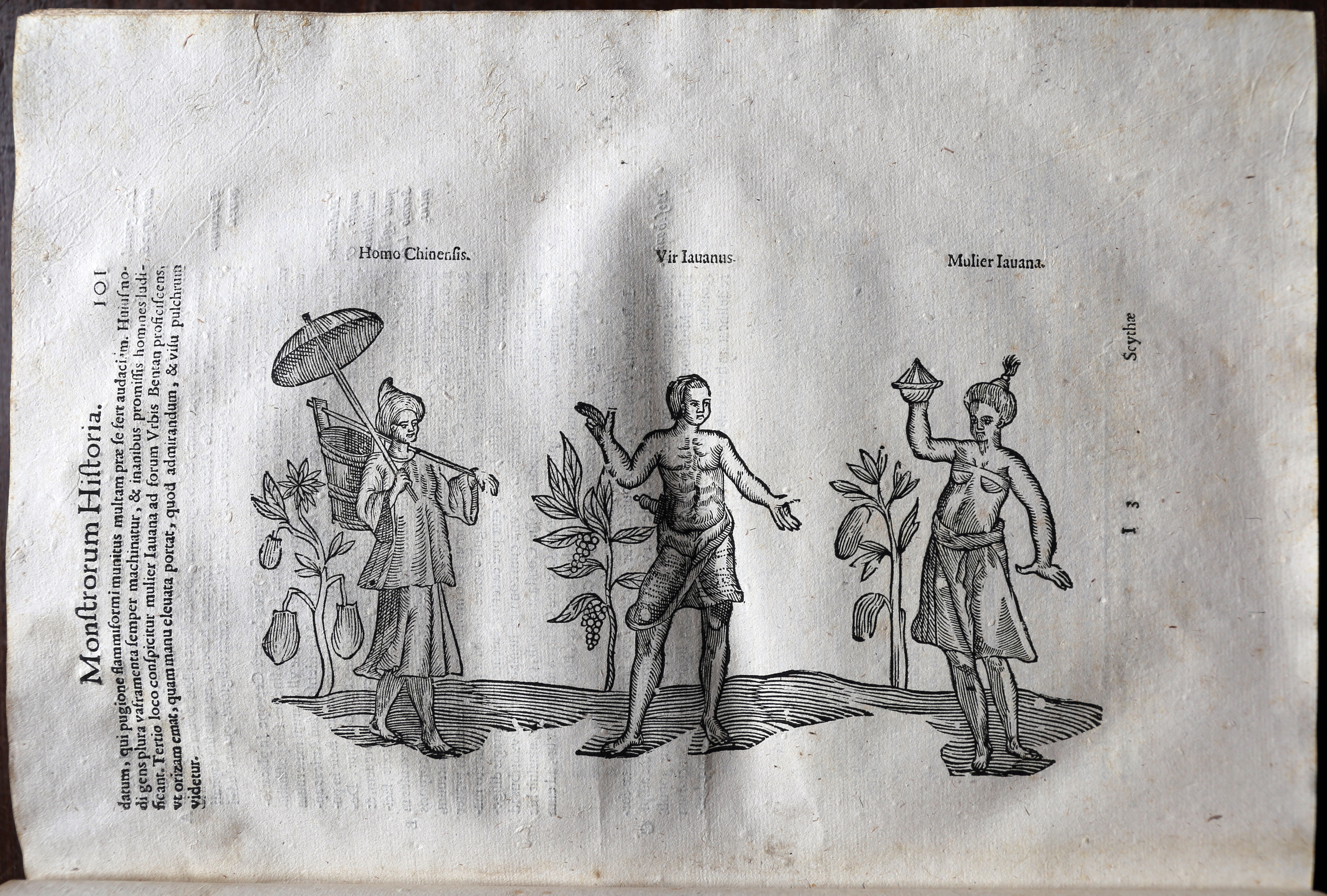
A Chinese man, a Japanese man, and a Japanese woman from Monstrorum Historia, 1642

=== The 19th century ===
During the 19th century, Italy and Japan experienced similar historical periods, characterised by huge changes in their political and social structure. Italy achieved national unity in 1861 during the period known as the Risorgimento, while Japan saw the end of the Bakufu system and the beginning in 1868 of a process of profound modernization along Western lines that came to be known as the Meiji Restoration.

This period also coincided with the beginning of formal relations between the two countries: in 1860 the first Italian merchant ship docked in Nagasaki, while the arrival of the military steamer Magenta in the port of Yokohama (27 May 1866) led to the signing of the Treaty of Friendship and Commerce on 25 August of the same year, ratified in Edo by Captain Vittorio Arminjon.

As a result, the Italian ships were able to expand their activities to the ports of Kanagawa, Nagasaki and Hakodate. One year later, Tokugawa Akitake, younger brother of the shogun Tokugawa Yoshinobu, went to Italy as part of the first official Japanese trip to the European country, which also corresponded to the last official trip organized by the Tokugawa shogunate, close to its collapse.

The beginning of official relations was also characterized by an intense commercial exchange, which led Italy, between the end of the Edo period (1603-1868) and the beginning of the Meiji period (1868-1912), to absorb up to one fifth of Japanese silkworm eggs exports.

In 1873, the Iwakura mission arrived in Italy, organized by the new government as part of the series of measures it had taken to renew Japan. A key figure in the relations between the two countries was Count Alessandro Fè d'Ostiani, designated Minister Plenipotentiary for China and Japan in 1870, who accompanied the members of the mission during their visit. The mission visited cities such as Florence, Naples, Venice and Rome, where it was received by Victor Emmanuel II. The main interest in Italy was directed towards artisanal works and the different aspects of modernization in the country.

Japanese art and culture was also influenced by Italy, not least because the painter Antonio Fontanesi, the sculptor Vincenzo Ragusa and the architect Giovanni Vincenzo Cappelletti came to Japan in 1876. They were invited by the government of Tokyo, as part of the modernization process strongly desired by Emperor Mutsuhito. Fontanesi became rector and head of the art department of the Tokyo Technical School of Fine Arts, Ragusa played a significant role in the development of modern Japanese sculpture by introducing bronze casting technologies and other European sculpture techniques, while Cappelletti designed the Yūshūkan military museum at the Yasukuni shrine.

The popularity of opera in Italy led to the development of a new musical genre called "Japanese opera", which in turn influenced Italian opera, as in the case of Giacomo Puccini's Madama Butterfly.

In 1894, a further agreement between the two countries was signed, strengthening the one of 1866, while in 1912 a treaty on trade and navigation was signed. Italy and Japan were also part of the Eight-Nation Alliance that put down the Boxer Rebellion in China between 1899 and 1901.

=== The World Wars ===
==== First World War ====
During World War I, they were both members of the Allied Powers and fought against Germany from 1914 to 1918. After the war, Italy turned out to be one of the nations in favor of the racial equality proposal put forward by Japan at the Paris Peace Conference in 1919. Military relations between the two countries also continued during the intervention in Siberia (1918-1922) during which they fought against Communists as allies. This operation that took place within the general framework of a larger plan of intervention by the Western powers and against the Red Army during the Russian Civil War.

In the meantime, in 1920, pilots Guido Masiero and Arturo Ferrarin, together with their engine drivers Roberto Maretto and Gino Capannini, successfully completed the 'Rome-Tokyo Raid', which writers Gabriele D'Annunzio and Harukichi Shimoi had called for, and which represented the first air link between Europe and Japan.

==== Second World War ====
Dissatisfaction with the post-World War I order led to the rise of authoritarian regimes in Italy and Japan. Both countries pursued aggressive foreign policies in the 1930s, ultimately culminating in the withdrawal of Italy and Japan from the League of Nations in 1933 and 1937, respectively. Italy and Japan established important political and diplomatic contacts that resulted in various political and economic agreements, sealed by the Italian economic mission to Nagasaki in 1938. Relations between the two countries were facilitated by Italy's recognition of Japanese rule in Manchuria and Japan's recognition of Italian rule in East Africa, the latter of which allowed the opening of important trade routes between Japan and the new Italian colonies. The alliance between Italy and Japan was formalized by the signing of the Tripartite Pact, which also included Germany, on September 27, 1940 in Berlin.

As leading members of the Axis powers, Italy and Japan took part in World War II against the Allied powers. Relations between Italy and Japan reached a high point on December 11, 1941, when Italy declared war on the United States in solidarity with Japan following its attack on Pearl Harbor four days earlier. However, relations between Italy and Japan came to a halt on September 3, 1943 with the signing of the Cassibile armistice. The Italian concession of Tianjin in China was subsequently occupied by the Imperial Japanese Army without fighting. The Italian soldiers that pledged allegiance to Benito Mussolini and the new Italian Social Republic had their weapons returned and were incorporated into the Japanese armed forces for the duration of the war. Japan maintained political and economic relations with the Social Republic until 1945, though relations were strained by differences in war aims during the final years of the conflict. After the war, 158 Italian nationals were deported from Japan.

=== Relations from 1945 to the present day ===
Italy and Japan, having both suffered defeat in World War II, resumed cooperation during the Cold War after a period of reconstruction and became integral parts of the so-called Western bloc (led by the United States), which for about half a century was politically and ideologically opposed to the Eastern bloc (led by the Soviet Union and comprising states adhering to the Warsaw Pact).

In 2002, the then President of the Italian Republic Carlo Azeglio Ciampi described relations between the two countries as being based on "an ancient and firm friendship, nourished by a continuous tradition of exchange and cooperation". In 2009, the Japanese government donated more than €6 million to Italy for the project of assistance and reconstruction of the city of L'Aquila, hit by an earthquake in April of that year. Similarly, Italy was at the forefront of providing humanitarian aid to Japan following the Tōhoku earthquake and tidal wave in 2011, as well as engaging in solidarity initiatives in the following years, mainly from the private sector. In 2014, Italian Prime Minister Matteo Renzi described relations with Japan as "absolutely important and crucial".

== High level visits ==
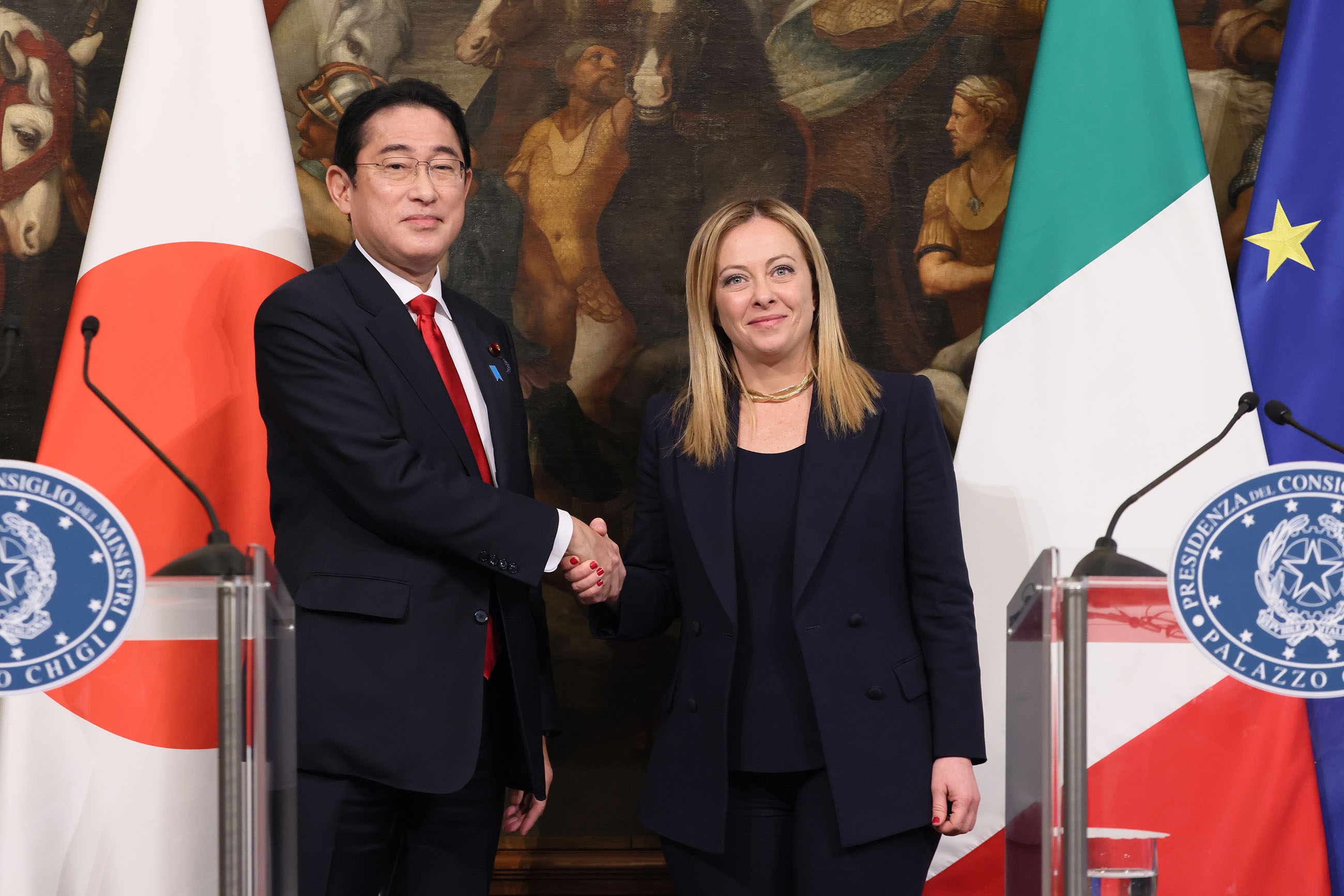
Italian Prime Minister Giorgia Meloni and Japanese Prime Minister Fumio Kishida at the Chigi Palace

On 10 January 2023, Japanese Prime Minister Fumio Kishida visited Italian Prime Minister Giorgia Meloni in Rome.

On 8 November 2023, Yōko Kamikawa, Minister for Foreign Affairs of Japan, held informal talks with Antonio Tajani, Italian Minister of Foreign Affairs and International Cooperation, on the margins of the G7 Foreign Ministers’ Meeting in Tokyo.

On 16 January 2026, the Italian Prime Minister Giorgia Meloni visited the Japanese Prime Minister Sanae Takaichi in Tokyo.

== Diaspora ==
The number of Japanese nationals residing in Italy is 14,937 as of 2019. The number of Italian nationals residing in Japan is 4,695 as of 2020.

== Resident diplomatic missions ==
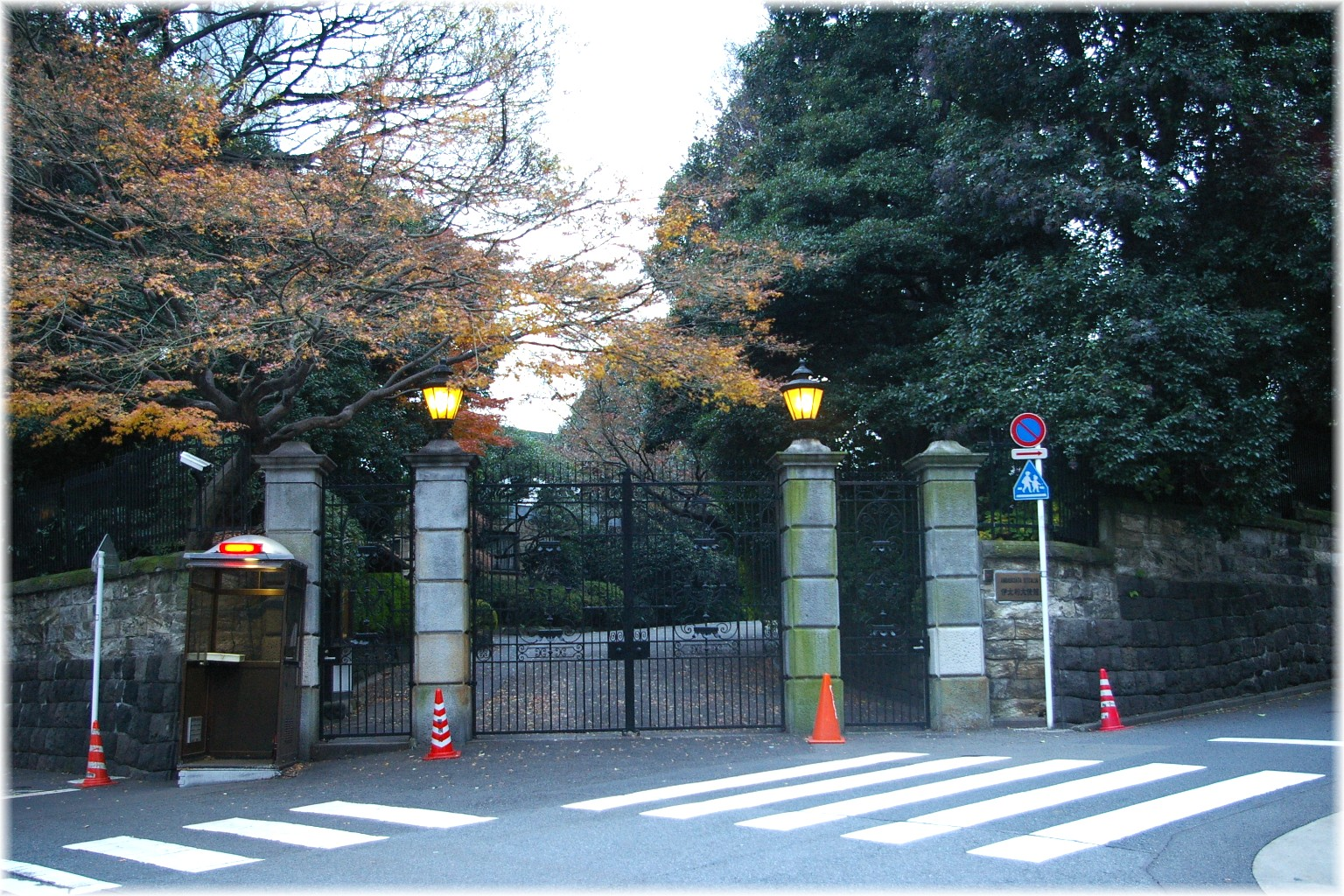
Embassy of Italy in Tokyo

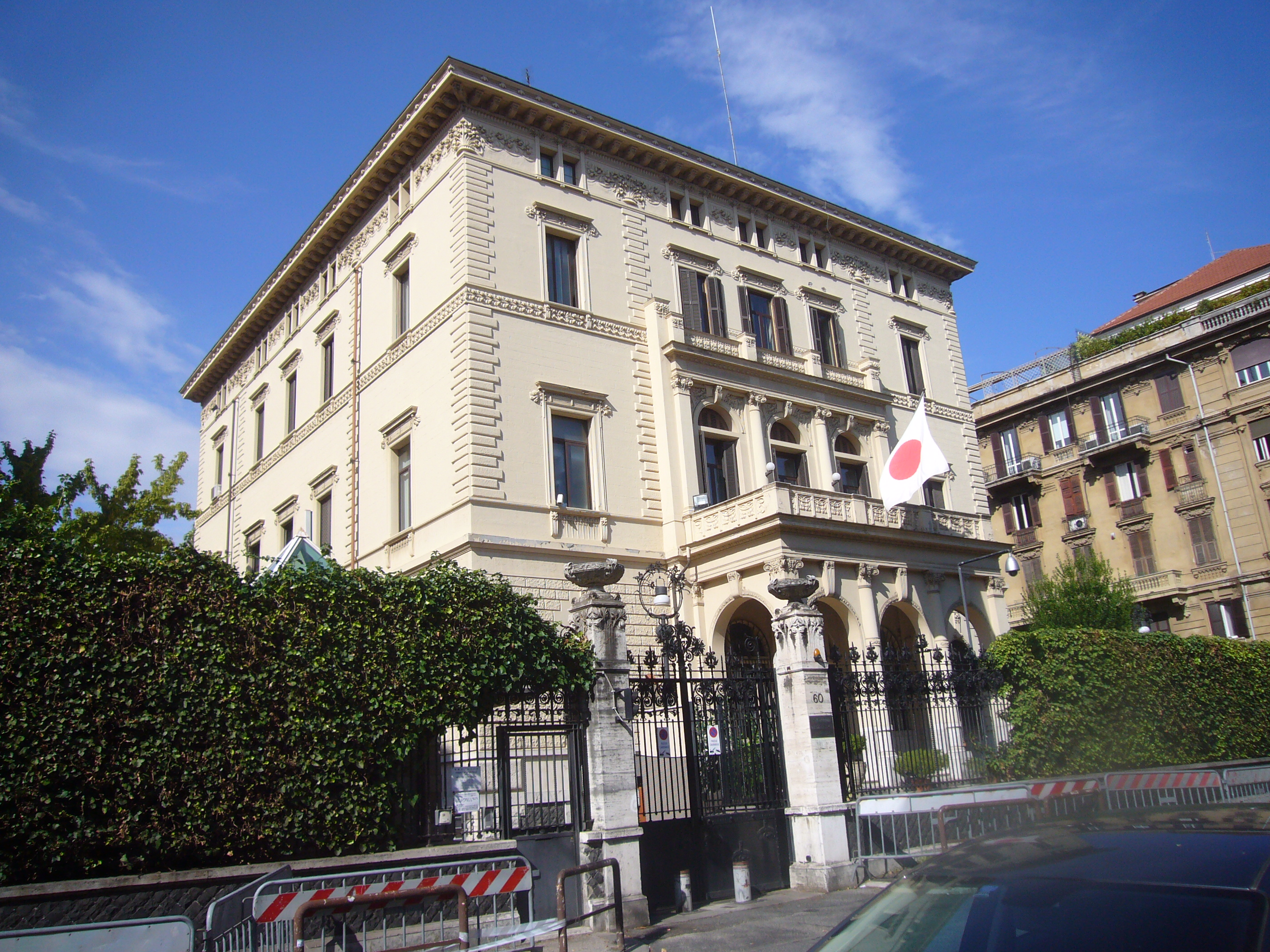
Embassy of Japan in Rome

- Italy has an embassy in Tokyo and a consulate-general in Osaka.
- Japan has an embassy in Rome and a consulate-general in Milan.

== See also ==
- Foreign relations of Italy
- Foreign relations of Japan
- Italians in Japan
- List of ambassadors of Japan to Italy
