= Egypt–Germany relations =

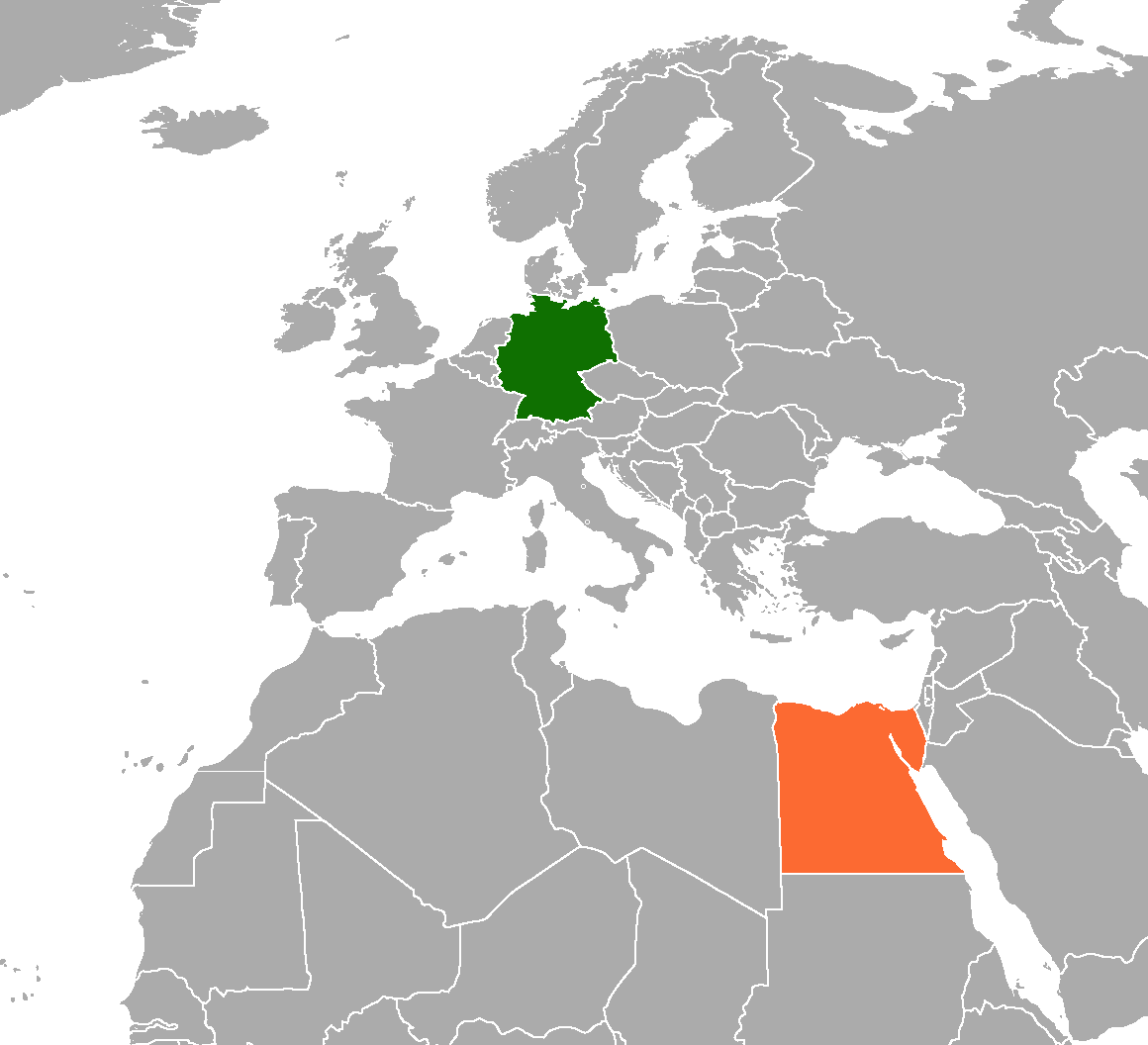

- Germany: Egypt

Diplomatic mission
- German embassy, Cairo: Egyptian embassy, Berlin

Egypt–Germany relations are the foreign relations between Egypt and Germany. The diplomatic relations between Egypt and Germany began in December 1957. Germany is an important trading partner of Egypt.

== History ==
British influence over Egypt was significantly strengthened following the 1882 Anglo-Egyptian war. Egyptian nationalists, such as Mustafa Kamil and Muhammad Farid saw Germany as a potential ally against the British. Kamil tried to convince Khedive Abbas II to invite the Kaiser's family to Egypt in 1896, but Abbas did not seize on this offer. Abbas later visited Berlin twice in 1897 and tried to explain the Egyptian perspective, but Germany was not ready to support Egypt at the time. Later, as Anglo-German relations deteriorated, German policy shifted. In 1905, the Arabist Max von Oppenheim invited Kamil to Berlin to a large reception. At the beginning of World War I, Abbas was deposed by the British. During the war, Ababs and Farid sought the support of the Ottomans and Germans against the British. However, after the 1919 Egyptian revolution, the Egyptian nationalist Saad Zaghloul urged his Egyptian delegation at the Paris Peace Conference to not support Germany: "The Wafd is not pleased with the leaflets which purport, on the one hand, to portray the Egyptians as being dependent on the Germans, and, on the other, as being favoured by the Bolsheviks. These leaflets benefit our enemies, by enabling them to claim that the Egyptian movement does maintain contacts with the Germans and with Bolshevism. That is harmful to our cause".

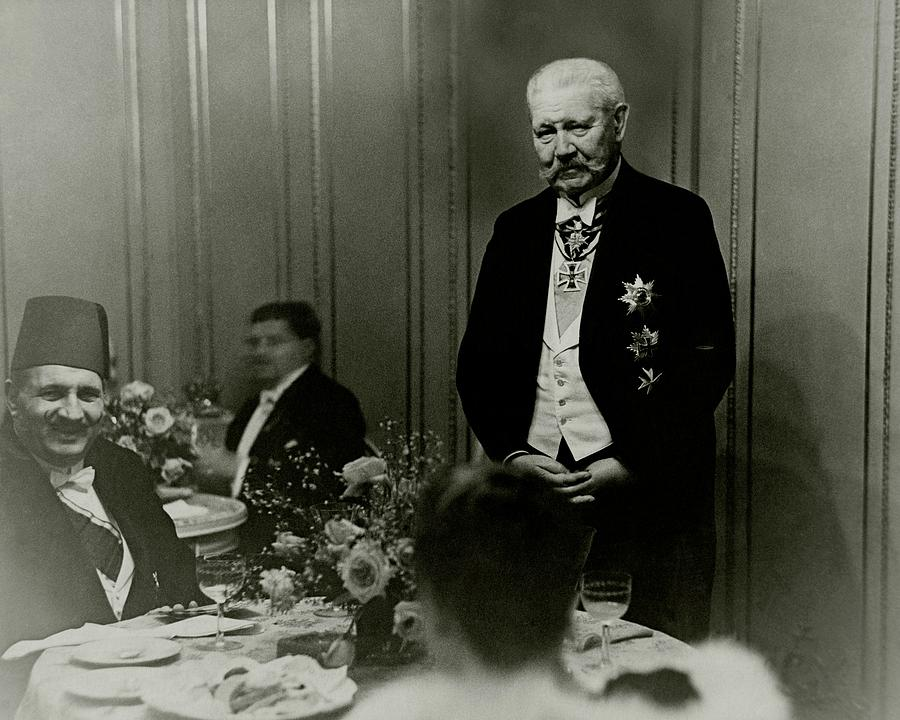
King Fuad I of Egypt with Paul von Hindenburg in a dining hall, Berlin, 10 June 1929.

King Fuad I made an official visit to Germany in 1929, meeting Paul Von Hindenburg. After this visit, Egyptians tried to get the Nefertiti bust returned to Egypt, which was and still is in the Egyptian Museum of Berlin, in exchange for two ancient Egyptian statues. Adolf Hitler's rise to power in 1933 frightened many local Egyptian Jews who lead boycotts and a media campaign against Hitler. The Egyptian government issued a letter against the boycott. Germany was Egypt's fourth largest trading partner in 1930; by 1932 Germany amounted to seven percent of Egyptian foreign trade. Still, the rising threat of fascism and Nazism lead many Egyptians intellectuals to speak out against Nazi Germany. German propagandists such as Wolfgang Diewerge helped spread Nazi propaganda in Egypt. Racist incidents in Nazi Germany against Egyptians caused complaints from the Egyptian embassy. Shortly before the outbreak of World War II, Nazi propaganda minister Joseph Goebbels visited Egypt in April 1939. Goebbels planned to visit in 1937 but canceled after protests by the Egyptian government; he was allowed a visit in 1939 only after agreeing to be a tourist, not to arrive as an official state visit. The Egyptian newspaper Akher Saa reported that "Nobody believes, not even Egyptians, that Dr. Goebbels flew here for a rest", quoting a speech Goebbels gave to a local German school where he announced "how splendid it would be" if German soldiers were occupying Egypt.

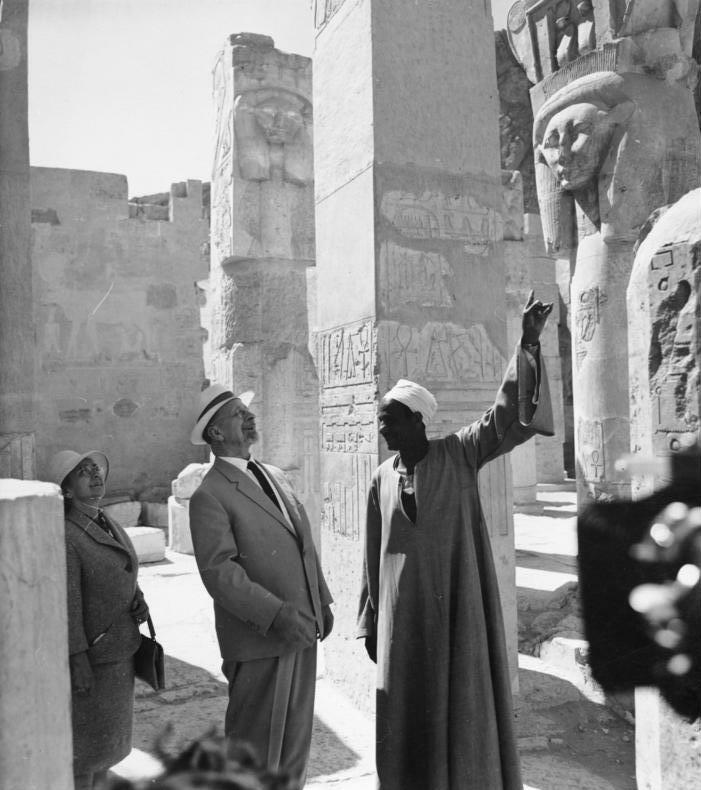
Ulbricht in Egypt

Egypt severed diplomatic relations with Nazi Germany on 4 September 1939, one day after the British declaration of war on Germany. German nationals in Egypt were interned and their property and businesses put in the care of a "Public Custodian for Enemy Assets". However, Egypt did not declare war on Germany yet, frustrating British officials. On the orders of Joachim von Ribbentrop and Heinrich Himmler, Germany interned Egyptian citizens as a response to the interning of Germans in Egypt. Egyptian officials were able to secure the release of some Egyptian nationals, such as a Mohammed Helmy. During the war, there were secret contacts between Egyptian and German officials. In April 1941, the Egyptian ambassador to Switzerland told the Hungarian ambassador that "every Egyptian hoped that the Axis would win the war", but that Egypt expected independence if the Axis won. On 3 July 1941, Youssef Zulficar Pasha - the Egyptian ambassador to Iran - passed on a message from King Farouk to a German official in Iran. The message gave details of a British attack on Iran and, as the German minister reported: "the Ambassador asked to transmit the views of the King to the RAM [the Reich’s Ministry of Foreign Affairs], and to express in a telegram the King’s desire for open and loyal relations with Germany." Anwar Sadat, then an Egyptian officer, met with German spies in Operation Salam for a potential revolt in Egypt, but he was arrested and imprisoned for the rest of the war. In April 1941, King Farouk sent a secret note to the German leader, Adolf Hitler, "looking forward to seeing German troops victorious in Egypt as soon as possible and as liberators from the intolerably brutal English yoke". In his reply, Hitler expressed a desire for the "independence of Egypt". On 26 February 1945, towards the end of World War II, Egypt formally declared war on Germany.

Following the end of World War II and the beginning of the Arab-Israeli conflict, Egypt sought to strengthen Egypt against its rival Israel. German experts who worked in Nazi Germany were recruited by the Egyptian government in this endeavor. In January 1951, 71 military experts from West Germany arrived in Cairo to train the Egyptian army. Ex-Nazis who worked Egypt include general Wilhelm Fahrmbacher, Oskar Munzel and Otto Skorzeny. Former manager of Reichswerke Hermann Göring, Dr Wilhelm Voss, arrived in Egypt in the end of 1950 and worked on building up the Egyptian arms industry, accompanying Egyptian officials on their visits to West Germany and setting up relations with West German officials. Voss was described by one source as the "uncrowned ambassador". The new Egyptian president, Gamal Abdel Nasser, recruited Reinhard Gehlen to organize and train the Egyptian security forces. The first West German ambassador to Egypt, Günther Pawelke, resigned in 1954 after refusing to collaborate with Voss. These German officials lost much of their influence post 1954, after the West German government gave them gave them strict guidelines after British criticism.

West Germany did not recognize Israel until 1965, due to concerns that it would hurt West German relations with Arab countries. A West German-Israeli arms deal coincided with a visit of East Germany's Walter Ulbricht to Egypt, damaging West German-Egyptian relations. On 10 July 1969, full diplomatic relations were established with East Germany.

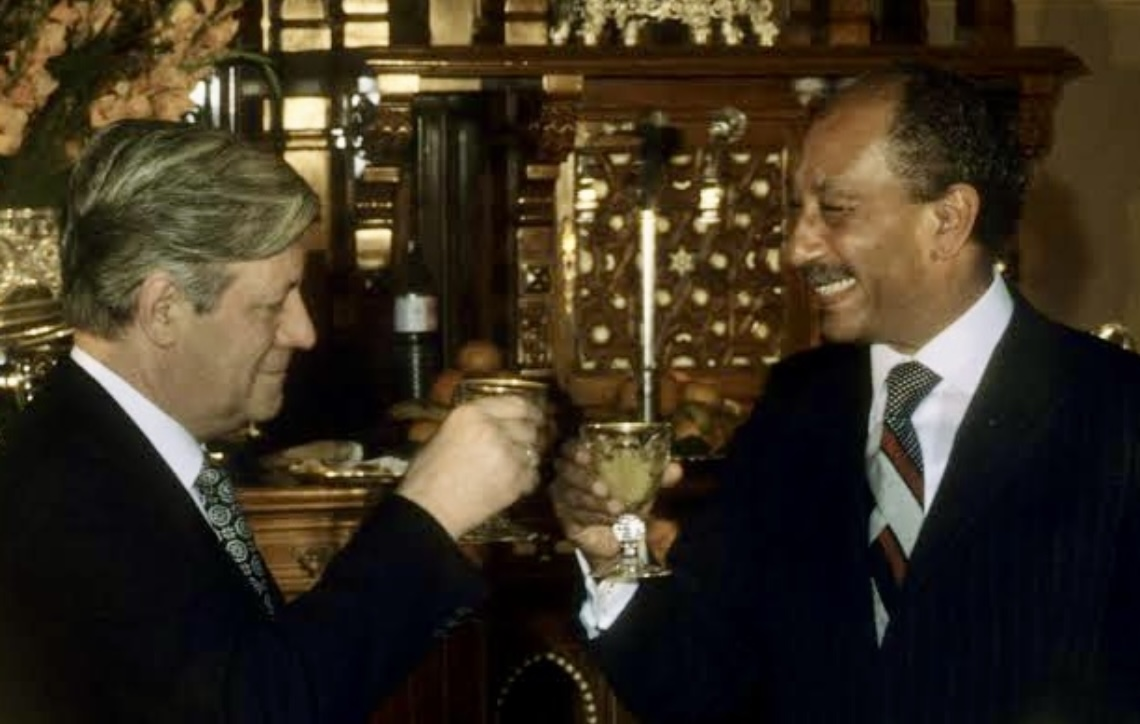
Egypt's President Anwar Sadat and Germany's Chancellor Helmut Schmidt, 1977

== Diplomatic missions ==
Egypt has an embassy in Berlin, as well as consulates in Frankfurt and Hamburg. Germany has an embassy in Cairo and a consulate in Alexandria.

== Economic relations ==
Egypt ranked third among the Arab countries trading with Germany. The German exports to Egypt totalled 2.1 billion euro in 2007. Whilst exports to Germany totalled 804 million euro. The German investments in Egypt are concentrated in the fields of small and medium-scale industries, information technology, car assembling, energy and land reclamation. In July 2005, Egypt and Germany signed an agreement on encouraging and protecting investments.

== Tourism ==
Egypt is one of the most important destinations for German tourists. In 2007, German visitors to Egypt numbered over one million (1,086,000), making Germans the second-largest group of tourists after the Russians. The Egyptian Government reports continuing growth of German tourists and estimates the possibility of reaching high levels of German tourists' inflow to hit 1.2 million.

German airline Lufthansa is one of the oldest foreign airlines to operate flights from Europe to Egypt. The airline has said "These flights are serving businessmen and tourists, thus making Lufthansa a key tool boosting the bilateral economic ties between Egypt and Germany". In addition, the airline now has code-share arrangements with Egyptair boosting travel between the nations.

== Cultural ==
In 1873, the Deutsche Evangelische Oberschule (German evangelic school) was established in Cairo.

There was a German club founded in 1853 in Alexandria and 1927 in Cairo.

The Egyptian–German cultural agreement, signed in 1959, is the major framework which organizes Egyptian–German cultural relations. Egypt and Germany also signed two agreements in 1979 and 1981 on scientific and cultural cooperation between the two countries.

Egyptian–German cultural cooperation is characterized in the following:

- Goethe institute, which successfully plays a leading role in promoting the German cultural activities in Egypt.
- The German Academic Exchange Service (DAAD), which offers many scholarships to Egyptian professors to study in Germany.
- Mubarak-Kohl project for technical and vocational education.
- The German University in Cairo, which was opened on October 5, 2003.

== See also ==
- Foreign relations of Egypt
- Foreign relations of Germany
- Egyptian Lever
