= Missionary diplomacy =

Missionary diplomacy was the policy of US President Woodrow Wilson that Washington had a moral responsibility to deny diplomatic recognition to any Latin American government that was not democratic. It was an expansion of President James Monroe's 1823 Monroe Doctrine.

"Missionary diplomacy" is a descriptive label often applied to the policies and practices of the United States in Mexico, Central America, and the Caribbean, as well as China, during the presidency of Woodrow Wilson (1913–1921). According to Arthur S. Link: [Secretary of State William Jennings], Bryan and Wilson were both fundamentally missionaries of democracy, driven by inner compulsions to give other peoples the blessings of democracy and inspired by the confidence that they knew better how to promote the peace and well-being of other countries than did the leaders of those countries themselves." Wilson related both missionary diplomacy and the New Freedom, his domestic program, to his concepts of morality and democratic government.

Woodrow Wilson came to the presidency with little knowledge of or interest in foreign affairs. His well-known remark to a Princeton friend, "It would be the irony of fate if my administration had to deal chiefly with foreign affairs," seemed to emphasize his concentration on domestic questions. But from the start of his term, Wilson saw close relationships between domestic and foreign policies. The New Freedom envisaged a return to free competition in the United States. The monopolistic interests had to be destroyed at home and their influence in foreign policy dispelled, and thus Wilson's initial rejection of "dollar diplomacy." Although he was not unqualifiedly hostile to business interests, he believed that their activities ought to serve, rather than dominate, the public interest. Wilson's ethical and religious beliefs profoundly influenced his foreign policy as president. Nations, like individuals, should adhere to high ethical and moral standards. Democracy, Wilson thought, was the most Christian of governmental systems, suitable for all peoples. The democratic United States thus had a moral mandate for world leadership. At the end of World War I, the president saw the League of Nations as an instrument for the application of Wilsonian democracy on an international scale. Wilson's foreign policy promoted liberal and humanitarian ends and was based on morality and idealism.

== See also ==
- Foreign policy of the Woodrow Wilson administration
- Moral diplomacy
