= Repudiation of debt at the Russian Revolution =

1918 sovereign debt crisis

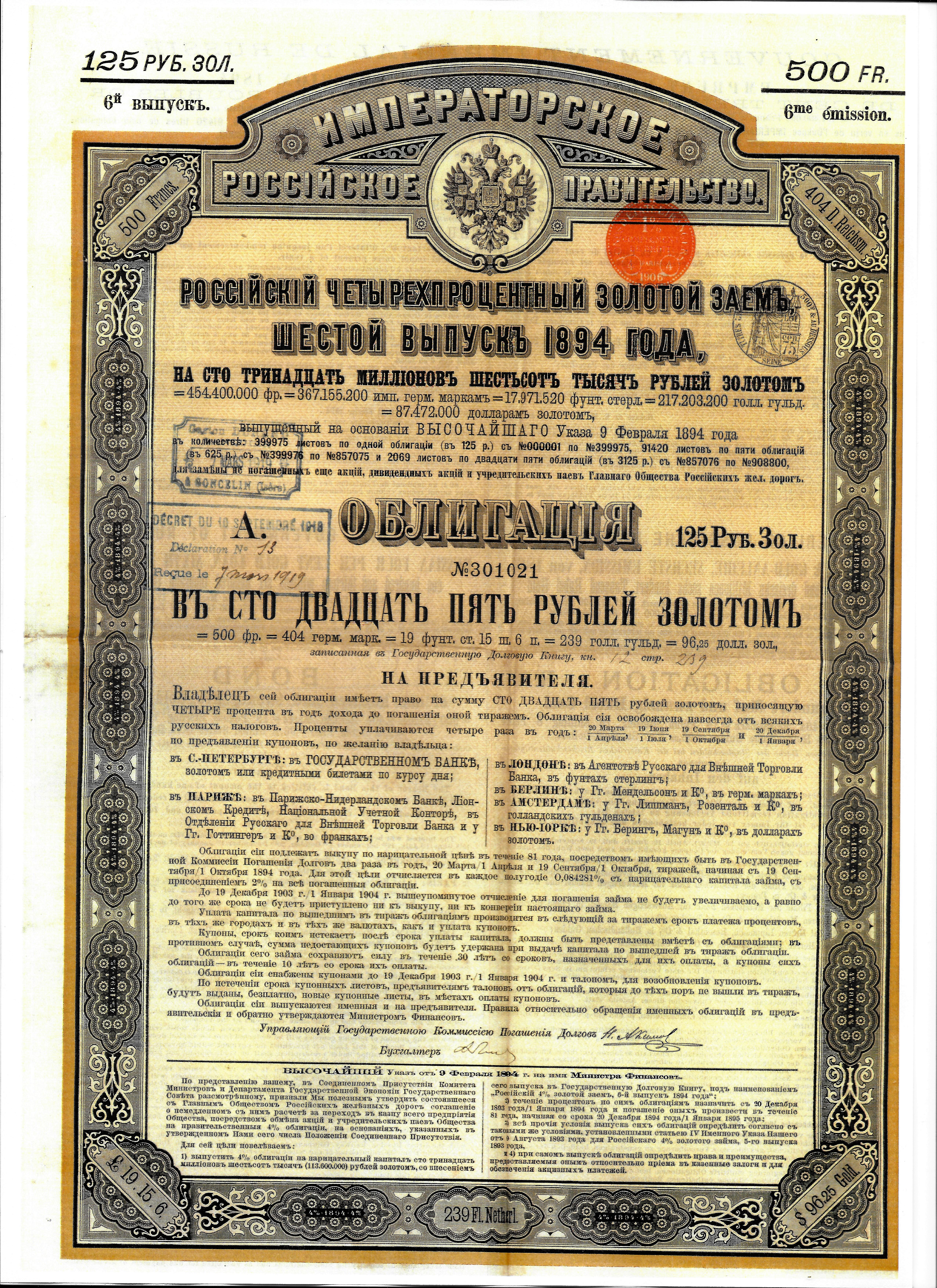
- Russian bonds of 1894

In February 1918, shortly after the Bolsheviks seized power in the Russian Revolution, their Council of People's Commissars repudiated the sovereign debt and other financial obligations of Russia. This position shocked international finance and triggered unanimous condemnation by the governments of the great powers. The British, and especially the French, had lost millions of pounds of foreign investment in Russia.

Revolutionary Russia completely fell out of the world economy as a result of this development and sealed itself up in isolation, which would not be disturbed until large-scale hostilities broke out with other states during World War II.

== From Tsarist Russia to the 1917 revolution ==
=== The Russian Empire ===
In the early 19th century, the Russian Empire turned to the public capital markets and, especially, foreign markets and foreign intermediaries, to regulate and stimulate the growth of its economy, financing its ambition and its development. The transformation from a feudal to a capitalist system proceeded little by little and required foreign investment. Until then, the Russian economy was mainly dominated by agricultural and local production and thus did not stimulate the creation of a national marketplace. Borrowing by the Russian government was important for both European and Russian domestic financial markets. It was the government's need to finance its budget deficit that stimulated the progress of the Russian financial system.

In 1913, foreign investors held 49.7% of Russian government debt and owned nearly 100% of all petroleum fields, 90% of mines, 50% of chemicals and 40% of metallurgical industries. This amounted to the largest foreign debt in the world at the time. France was the major lender to Russia and French investors financed the creation of iron and steel industries and mining operations. In 1914, 80% of the Russian government debt was held in France and 14% in Great Britain.

=== World War I ===
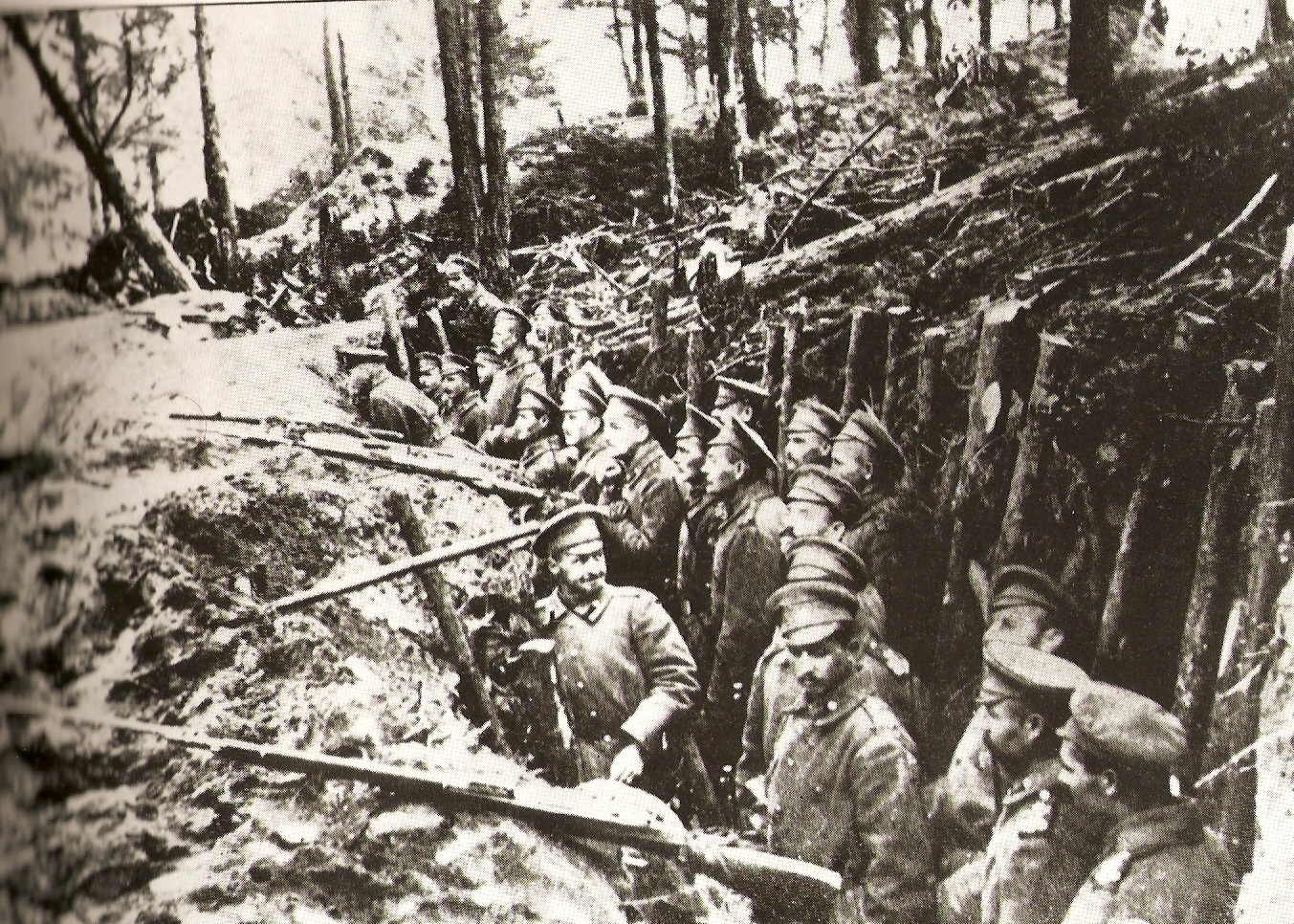
Russian forest trench at the Battle of Sarikamish, 1914–1915

Russia entered World War I in July 1914. Germany, France, Great Britain and Tsarist Russia had been preparing for war for a long time. Military spending was enormous and financially catastrophic for the Russian government.

Between the beginning of the war and Bolsheviks’ accession to power, the debt soared to £3,385 million, about 3.5 times what it had been. Furthermore, the First World War caused 3,300,000 deaths in Russia between 1914 and February 1917: 1,800,000 soldiers and 1,500,000 civilians. Thus, the burden of the war finally caused a complete collapse of the economy and a change in the political system.

=== The Russian revolutions ===
On February 17, 1917, the Tsar Nicholas II, the last Emperor of Russia, was forced to sign his abdication and the end of the Russian Imperial Government and of the Romanov dynasty. The new provisional government decided to continue the war, which meant more military spending. To increase budget revenues, a state monopoly was introduced on the sales of sugar, tea, matches, tobacco, and other consumer products. However debasing the currency by printing new money remained the main source of funds to cover the budget deficit. This was a period of hyperinflation.

Bolshevik revolutionaries overthrew the government on October 24, 1917, subsequently creating the Soviet government. The amounts of payments in default were enormous. Russian debt to Great Britain alone at the end of World War I was estimated at between 538 and 568 million pounds. The amount of debt to France was estimated at 3,573 million francs and Russian foreign debt to Japan equaled 147 million dollars.

== The debt repudiation ==
On February 8, 1918, the Soviet government repudiated all bonds issued by the Tsarist government when the Soviet of People's Commissars of the Russian Soviet Federative Socialist Republic (RSFSR) cancelled all previously issued Russian government debt. It stopped payment on foreign debt at the beginning of 1918 and declared that all debts contracted by the Russian Empire were cancelled, as well as the debts contracted by the Russian Provisional Government, so that the war could be continued from February to November 1917.

At the same time, the Soviets decided to expropriate all assets of foreign nations in Russia. The Soviets also nationalized banks, lands, and industries. By repudiating the external debt, the Soviet government implemented the Petrograd Soviet’s decision of 1905.

=== Reaction of creditors ===
The cancellation of the foreign debt by Soviet Russia stunned international finance and triggered universal denunciation by the allied powers. Western governments were convinced that they should openly support the anti-Bolshevik forces to restore a capitalist order.

Some debtors called for an intensification of the Allied intervention in the Russian Civil War.

== Modern day ==
In 1986, the Soviet government settled a foreign compensation debt with the United Kingdom from the slavic sovereign default looming in 1917.

After the dissolution of the Soviet Union in 1991, the newly formed Russian Federation had to not only come up with a new financial strategy for its future, but also had to consider repaying the billions of dollars the Soviet Union borrowed from abroad. In 1996, Paris and Moscow signed an accord for Russia to repay a nominal value of between $80 and $100 for each of the 4 million czarist bonds believed to remain in circulation in France, for a total payout of around $400 million. Russia paid but not nearly as generously as the descendants of French bond buyers hoped.

By August 21, 2006, all the Soviet era debts to the west are considered to have been paid off by Russian Federation. Following August 21, 2017, the last remaining Soviet Union foreign debt has been repaid, concluding all the Soviet Union legacy debts being repaid in full by Russian Federation.

== See also ==
- Treaty of Brest-Litovsk
- Treaty of Rapallo (1922)

== Bibliography ==
- "War-Debts of Europe". Advocate of Peace. 7 (17–18): 201–210. May 1848. JSTOR 27891088.
- Raffalovich, Arthur (January 1902). "The Public Debt of Russia". North American Review. 174 (542): 124–135. JSTOR 25105280.
- Ford, Worthington Chauncey (March 1902). "The Economy of Russia". Political Science Quarterly. 17 (1): 99–124. doi:10.2307/2140382. JSTOR 2140382.
- McRoberts, Samuel (November 1916). "Russia's Future Needs for Capital". Annals of the American Academy of Political and Social Science. 68: 207–215. doi:10.1177/000271621606800133. JSTOR 1013091.
- Bakhmeteff, Boris (January 1918). "War and Finance in Russia". Annals of the American Academy of Political and Social Science. 75: 191–200. doi:10.1177/000271621807500119. JSTOR 1014020.
- Thacher, Thomas D. (July 1919). "Economic Force and the Russian Problem". Annals of the American Academy of Political and Social Science. 84: 121–126. doi:10.1177/000271621908400116. JSTOR 1014150.
- Bullard, Arthur (March 1922). "Russia in the Fabric of International Finance". Annals of the American Academy of Political and Social Science. 100: 10–12. doi:10.1177/000271622210000103. JSTOR 1015228.
- Paish, George (July 1925). "Debt Cancellations from an English Viewpoint". Annals of the American Academy of Political and Social Science. 120: 30–35. doi:10.1177/000271622512000108. JSTOR 1015633.
- Institute of Economics (June 1926). "The Problem of International Debts". Advocate of Peace through Justice. 88 (6): 354–358. JSTOR 20661295.
- Taylor, Alonzo Englebert (September 1926). "Wheat and Wheat Flour". Annals of the American Academy of Political and Social Science. 127: 30–48. doi:10.1177/000271622612700105. JSTOR 1015692.
- Taylor, Alonzo Englebert (October 1926). "World Food Resources". Foreign Affairs. 5 (1): 18–32. doi:10.2307/20028503. JSTOR 20028503.
- Davis, Jerome (July 1927). "One Hundred and Fifty Years of American-Russian Relations, 1777-1927". Annals of the American Academy of Political and Social Science. 132: 18–31. doi:10.1177/000271622713200106. JSTOR 1016052.
- "France and the Soviets". Advocate of Peace through Justice. 89 (11): 597–598. November 1927. JSTOR 20661725.
- Denza, Eileen; Poulsen, Lauge (May 15, 2023). "Settling Russia's Imperial and Baltic Debts" (PDF). American Journal of International Law. 117 (3): 441–480. doi:10.1017/ajil.2023.23.
