= Moral diplomacy =

Form of Diplomacy

Moral diplomacy is a form of diplomacy proposed by President Woodrow Wilson in his 1912 United States presidential election. Moral diplomacy is the system in which support is given only to countries whose beliefs are analogous to that of the nation. This promotes the growth of the nation's ideals and damages nations with different ideologies. It was used by Woodrow Wilson to support countries with democratic governments and to economically injure non-democratic countries (seen as possible threats to the U.S.). He also hoped to increase the number of democratic nations, particularly in Latin America.

== Conception ==
Woodrow Wilson was the chief advocate of the idea that democracy is the most essential aspect of a stable and prospering nation. He also believed that the United States had to play the pioneering role in promoting democracy and peace throughout the world. Several nations, especially in Latin-America, were under the influence of imperialism, something that Wilson opposed. In order to curb the growth of imperialism, and spread democracy, Wilson came up with the idea of moral diplomacy.

Wilson's moral diplomacy replaced the dollar diplomacy of William Howard Taft, which highlighted the importance of economic support to improve bilateral ties between two nations. Taft's dollar diplomacy was based on economic support, while Wilson's moral diplomacy was based on economic power.

=== American exceptionalism ===
Many of Woodrow Wilson's ideas about moral diplomacy and America's role in the world come from American exceptionalism. American exceptionalism is the proposition that the United States is different from other countries in that it has a specific world mission to spread liberty and democracy. In this view, America's exceptionalism stems from its emergence from a revolution and developing a uniquely American ideology, based on liberty, egalitarianism, individualism, populism and laissez-faire. This observation can be traced to Alexis de Tocqueville, the first writer to describe the United States as "exceptional" in 1831 and 1840. In Woodrow Wilson's 1914 address on "The Meaning of Liberty" he alludes to America's potential to be "the light which will shine unto all generations and guide the feet of mankind to the goal of justice and liberty and peace" and he later puts those ideas into action through moral diplomacy.

== International effects ==
Wilson frequently intervened in the affairs of other countries, specifically Latin America, saying in 1913: "I am going to teach the South American republics to elect good men". These interventions included Mexico in 1914, Haiti from 1915–1934, Dominican Republic in 1916, Cuba in 1917, and Panama in 1918. The U.S. maintained troops in Nicaragua throughout the Wilson administration and used them to select the president of Nicaragua. American troops in Haiti, under the command of the federal government, forced the Haitian legislature to choose the candidate Wilson selected as Haitian President. Wilson felt that the US had a duty to spread democracy, and used aggressive moral diplomacy to ensure this objective.

Wilson had international problems, particularly in Mexico. Mexico had seen a series of revolutions since 1910. Americans with mining and other interests in Mexico wanted immediate U.S. intervention to protect their property. When Victoriano Huerta gained control of Mexico in 1913 Wilson refused to recognize him, despite most Americans and many foreign powers supporting him, because he had illegally seized power. Other countries supported Huerta mainly due to his open policies toward foreign investment. In April 1914, Mexican officials in Tampico arrested a few American sailors who blundered into a prohibited area, and Wilson used the incident to justify ordering the U.S. Navy to occupy the port city of Veracruz. The move greatly weakened Huerta's control, and he abandoned power to Venustiano Carranza, whom Wilson immediately recognized as the president of Mexico.

== See also ==
- Idealism in international relations
- Missionary diplomacy
- Woodrow Wilson
