= Foreign relations of Mongolia =

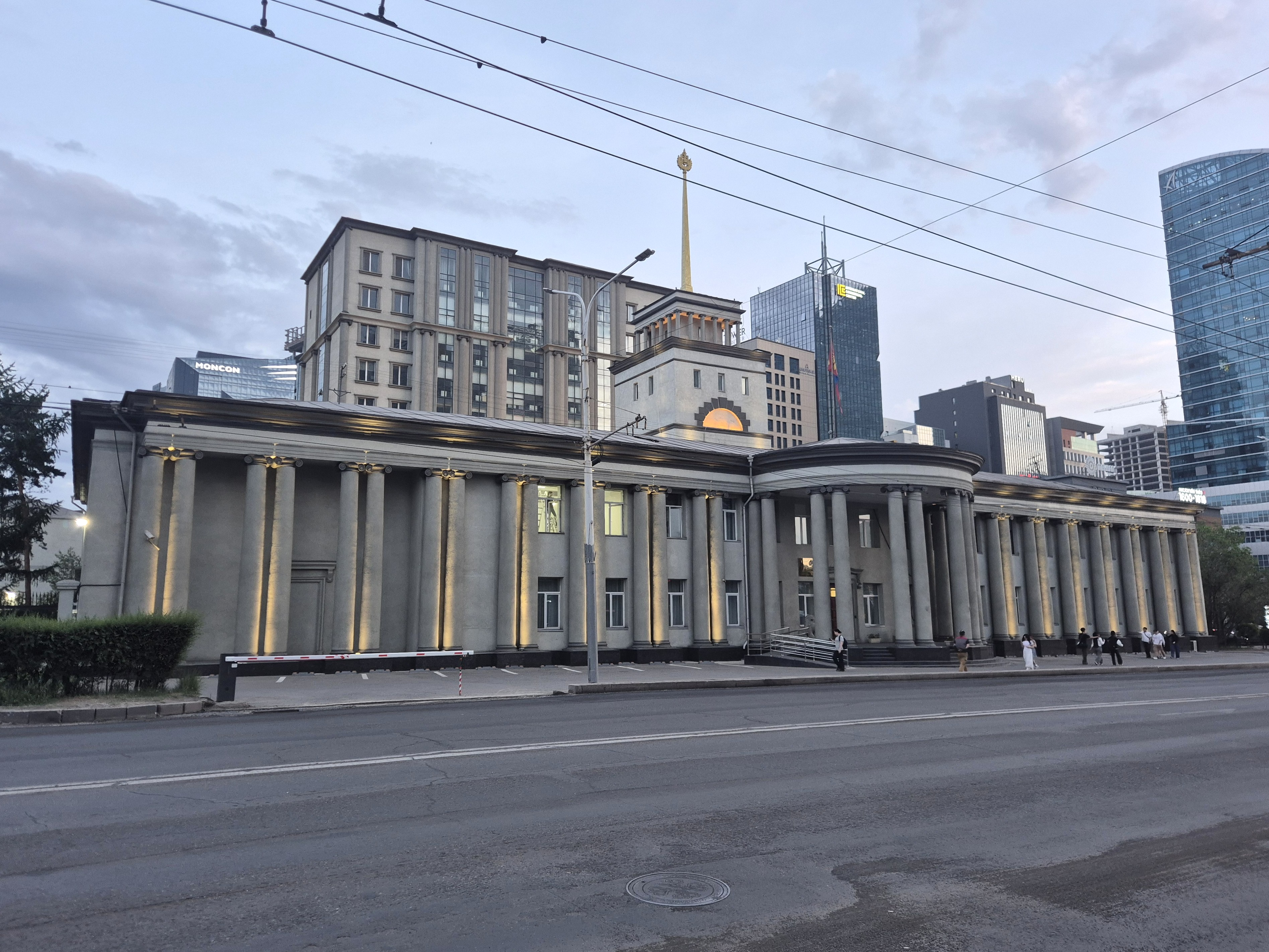
Ministry of Foreign Affairs of Mongolia

Mongolia has diplomatic relations with all 192 UN states, the Holy See, the State of Palestine and the European Union.

Its geopolitical position is defined by its geographical location, situated between Russia and China, relying on trade with both sides. Officially, it maintains a neutral stance on international matters. It has a modest number of missions abroad.

== Diplomatic relations ==
List of countries which Mongolia maintains diplomatic relations with:

| # | Country | Date |
|---|---|---|
| 1 | Russia | 5 November 1921 |
| 2 | North Korea | 15 October 1948 |
| 3 | Albania | 24 March 1949 |
| 4 | China | 16 October 1949 |
| 5 | Poland | 14 April 1950 |
| 6 | Bulgaria | 22 April 1950 |
| 7 | Czech Republic | 25 April 1950 |
| 8 | Hungary | 28 April 1950 |
| 9 | Romania | 29 April 1950 |
| 10 | Vietnam | 17 November 1954 |
| 11 | India | 24 December 1955 |
| 12 | Myanmar | 26 September 1956 |
| 13 | Serbia | 20 November 1956 |
| 14 | Indonesia | 21 December 1956 |
| 15 | Guinea | 22 April 1960 |
| 16 | Cambodia | 30 November 1960 |
| 17 | Cuba | 7 December 1960 |
| 18 | Nepal | 5 January 1961 |
| 19 | Mali | 25 January 1961 |
| 20 | Algeria | 25 June 1961 |
| 21 | Sri Lanka | 1 February 1962 |
| 22 | Afghanistan | 1 February 1962 |
| 23 | Iraq | 5 February 1962 |
| 24 | Pakistan | 6 July 1962 |
| 25 | Laos | 12 September 1962 |
| 26 | United Kingdom | 23 January 1963 |
| 27 | Egypt | 2 April 1963 |
| 28 | Austria | 1 July 1963 |
| 29 | Finland | 15 July 1963 |
| 30 | Switzerland | 22 May 1964 |
| 31 | Sweden | 30 June 1964 |
| 32 | France | 27 April 1965 |
| 33 | Ghana | 7 December 1965 |
| 34 | Republic of the Congo | 31 December 1966 |
| 35 | Tanzania | 17 January 1967 |
| 36 | Ethiopia | 24 January 1967 |
| 37 | Greece | 3 March 1967 |
| 38 | Mauritania | 30 June 1967 |
| 39 | Syria | 31 July 1967 |
| 40 | Norway | 11 January 1968 |
| 41 | Denmark | 5 August 1968 |
| 42 | Turkey | 24 June 1969 |
| 43 | Singapore | 11 June 1970 |
| 44 | Central African Republic | 18 June 1970 |
| 45 | Italy | 29 June 1970 |
| 46 | Sudan | 7 July 1970 |
| 47 | Morocco | 14 July 1970 |
| 48 | Yemen | 28 August 1970 |
| 49 | Somalia | 28 February 1971 |
| 50 | Iran | 20 May 1971 |
| 51 | Chile | 1 June 1971 |
| 52 | Belgium | 8 July 1971 |
| 53 | Argentina | 7 September 1971 |
| 54 | Malaysia | 8 September 1971 |
| 55 | Nigeria | 21 September 1971 |
| 56 | Japan | 24 February 1972 |
| 57 | Netherlands | 6 March 1972 |
| 58 | Bangladesh | 28 June 1972 |
| 59 | Australia | 15 September 1972 |
| 60 | Philippines | 11 October 1973 |
| 61 | Canada | 30 November 1973 |
| 62 | Cyprus | 19 December 1973 |
| 63 | Germany | 31 January 1974 |
| 64 | Thailand | 5 March 1974 |
| 65 | Iceland | 4 June 1974 |
| 66 | Portugal | 26 July 1974 |
| 67 | Democratic Republic of the Congo | 4 February 1975 |
| 68 | New Zealand | 8 April 1975 |
| 69 | Kuwait | 17 June 1975 |
| 70 | Mexico | 24 September 1975 |
| 71 | Mozambique | 27 September 1975 |
| 72 | Guinea-Bissau | 14 October 1975 |
| 73 | São Tomé and Príncipe | 22 October 1975 |
| 74 | Cape Verde | 19 November 1975 |
| 75 | Angola | 10 February 1976 |
| 76 | Fiji | 15 March 1976 |
| 77 | Liberia | 23 April 1976 |
| 78 | Libya | 16 June 1976 |
| 79 | Papua New Guinea | 16 June 1976 |
| 80 | Luxembourg | 11 July 1976 |
| 81 | Tunisia | 15 February 1977 |
| 82 | Benin | 2 April 1977 |
| 83 | Costa Rica | 6 June 1977 |
| 84 | Spain | 5 July 1977 |
| 85 | Zambia | 2 October 1978 |
| 86 | Madagascar | 11 May 1979 |
| 87 | Malta | 8 August 1979 |
| 88 | Nicaragua | 13 October 1979 |
| 89 | Guyana | 15 December 1979 |
| 90 | Grenada | 25 July 1980 |
| 91 | Jordan | 21 May 1981 |
| 92 | Seychelles | 21 August 1981 |
| 93 | Ecuador | 30 October 1982 |
| 94 | Zimbabwe | 30 August 1984 |
| 95 | Lesotho | 2 July 1985 |
| 96 | Burkina Faso | 25 October 1985 |
| 97 | Maldives | 6 November 1985 |
| 98 | Senegal | 12 December 1985 |
| 99 | Ivory Coast | 6 July 1986 |
| 100 | United States | 27 January 1987 |
| 101 | Brazil | 19 June 1987 |
| 102 | Colombia | 10 August 1988 |
| 103 | Bolivia | 1 March 1989 |
| — | State of Palestine | 13 October 1989 |
| 104 | South Korea | 26 March 1990 |
| 105 | Namibia | 30 November 1990 |
| 106 | Venezuela | 14 December 1990 |
| 107 | Israel | 2 October 1991 |
| 108 | Latvia | 15 October 1991 |
| 109 | Estonia | 20 November 1991 |
| 110 | Lithuania | 11 December 1991 |
| 111 | Ukraine | 21 January 1992 |
| 112 | Kazakhstan | 22 January 1992 |
| 113 | Belarus | 24 January 1992 |
| 114 | Uzbekistan | 25 January 1992 |
| 115 | Moldova | 30 January 1992 |
| 116 | Armenia | 21 February 1992 |
| — | Holy See | 4 April 1992 |
| 117 | Azerbaijan | 16 April 1992 |
| 118 | Kyrgyzstan | 22 April 1992 |
| 119 | Turkmenistan | 23 April 1992 |
| 120 | Tajikistan | 24 April 1992 |
| 121 | Oman | 27 April 1992 |
| 122 | Georgia | 12 May 1992 |
| 123 | Brunei | 18 May 1992 |
| 124 | Slovakia | 1 January 1993 |
| 125 | Slovenia | 18 February 1993 |
| 126 | Bosnia and Herzegovina | 24 February 1993 |
| 127 | Croatia | 10 March 1993 |
| 128 | South Africa | 25 May 1994 |
| 129 | North Macedonia | 27 June 1995 |
| 130 | United Arab Emirates | 1 April 1996 |
| 131 | Peru | 30 May 1997 |
| 132 | Uruguay | 7 October 1997 |
| 133 | Qatar | 21 January 1998 |
| 134 | Lebanon | 5 February 1998 |
| 135 | Liechtenstein | 18 March 1998 |
| 136 | Bahrain | 16 May 1998 |
| 137 | Ireland | 22 December 1998 |
| 138 | El Salvador | 14 July 1999 |
| 139 | Tonga | 4 April 2000 |
| 140 | Paraguay | 17 June 2003 |
| 141 | Timor-Leste | 28 October 2003 |
| 142 | Guatemala | 3 July 2006 |
| 143 | Montenegro | 1 February 2007 |
| 144 | Saudi Arabia | 12 February 2007 |
| 145 | San Marino | 25 April 2007 |
| 146 | Monaco | 22 May 2008 |
| 147 | Dominican Republic | 27 May 2010 |
| 148 | Nauru | 13 October 2011 |
| 149 | Saint Vincent and the Grenadines | 13 October 2011 |
| 150 | Solomon Islands | 13 October 2011 |
| 151 | Dominica | 18 October 2011 |
| 152 | Honduras | 19 October 2011 |
| 153 | Andorra | 21 October 2011 |
| 154 | Comoros | 5 December 2011 |
| 155 | Tuvalu | 5 December 2011 |
| 156 | South Sudan | 20 December 2011 |
| 157 | Malawi | 21 December 2011 |
| 158 | Samoa | 21 December 2011 |
| 159 | Gambia | 22 December 2011 |
| 160 | Panama | 17 January 2012 |
| 161 | Bhutan | 17 January 2012 |
| 162 | Kenya | 22 March 2012 |
| 163 | Jamaica | 26 October 2012 |
| 164 | Antigua and Barbuda | 19 April 2013 |
| 165 | Eritrea | 24 June 2013 |
| 166 | Burundi | 8 July 2013 |
| 167 | Togo | 6 September 2013 |
| 168 | Vanuatu | 23 September 2013 |
| 169 | Palau | 25 September 2013 |
| 170 | Suriname | 27 September 2013 |
| 171 | Sierra Leone | 27 September 2013 |
| 172 | Uganda | 20 November 2013 |
| 173 | Rwanda | 25 November 2013 |
| 174 | Federated States of Micronesia | 6 December 2013 |
| 175 | Haiti | 14 January 2014 |
| 176 | Kiribati | 15 January 2014 |
| 177 | Equatorial Guinea | 20 February 2014 |
| 178 | Chad | 3 April 2014 |
| 179 | Mauritius | 3 July 2014 |
| 180 | Gabon | 19 September 2014 |
| 181 | Saint Lucia | 27 September 2014 |
| 182 | Niger | 25 March 2015 |
| 183 | Cameroon | 2 April 2015 |
| 184 | Marshall Islands | 23 May 2015 |
| 185 | Djibouti | 20 January 2016 |
| 186 | Saint Kitts and Nevis | 12 April 2016 |
| 187 | Bahamas | 8 July 2016 |
| 188 | Belize | 20 June 2017 |
| 189 | Eswatini | 21 November 2018 |
| 190 | Barbados | 17 January 2019 |
| 191 | Trinidad and Tobago | 24 February 2021 |
| 192 | Botswana | 6 December 2023 |

== Africa ==
| Country | Formal Relations Began | Notes |
|---|---|---|
| Egypt | 2 April 1963 | Further information: Egypt–Mongolia relations Diplomatic relations between Egypt and Mongolia were established in 1964. Cairo currently hosts Mongolia's only embassy on the African continent. In 2001, Mongolia sent policemen to Egypt to attend trainings sessions on anti-terrorism and the prevention of drug trafficking. Mongolian President Natsagiin Bagabandi and his wife Azadsurengiin Oyunbileg paid an official visit to Egypt in April 2004, during which he invited Egyptian President Hosni Mubarak to pay him a return visit in Mongolia. Almost exactly one year later, Egyptian Foreign Minister Ahmed Aboul Gheit visited Mongolia, during which he began the planning of mutual visits of the ministers of finance of the two countries. Bilateral relations between Mongolia and Egypt (in Mongolian) |

== Americas ==
| Country | Formal Relations Began | Notes |
|---|---|---|
| Canada | 1973-11-30 | Further information: Canada–Mongolia relations Both countries established diplomatic relations on 30 November 1973. Canada is represented in Mongolia through its embassy in Ulaanbaatar. Mongolia has an embassy in Ottawa, and in 2002 opened an honorary consulate in Toronto. Though Canada and Mongolia established diplomatic ties in 1973, ad hoc linkages and minor activities occurred between the two countries mainly through the Canada-Mongolia Society, which disbanded in 1980. When Mongolia formed a democratic government in 1991 after the collapse of the Soviet Union, Canada began to support Mongolia with donor activities through the International Development Research Centre, Canadian International Development Agency and several non-governmental organizations. |
| Mexico | 1975-09-24 | Further information: Mexico–Mongolia relations In October 2001, Mexican President Vicente Fox paid an official visit to Mongolia.: Mexico is accredited to Mongolia from its embassy in Seoul, South Korea and maintains an honorary consulate in Ulaanbaatar.; Mongolia is accredited to Mexico from its embassy in Washington, D.C., United States and maintains an honorary consulate in Mexico City. |
| Paraguay | 2003-06-17 | Mongolia is accredited to Paraguay through its embassy in Brasilia, Brazil.; Paraguay is accredited to Mongolia through its embassy in Seoul, South Korea.; Mongolia signed a visa-free agreement with Paraguay on 26 September 2019. |
| Trinidad and Tobago | 2021-02-24 | |
| United States | 1987-01-27 | Further information: Mongolia–United States relations The U.S. government recognized Mongolia in January 1987 and established its first embassy in Ulaanbaatar in June 1988. It formally opened in September 1988. The first U.S. ambassador to Mongolia, Richard L. Williams, was not a resident there. Joseph E. Lake, the first resident ambassador, arrived in July 1990. Secretary of State James A. Baker, III visited Mongolia in August 1990, and again in July 1991. Mongolia accredited its first ambassador to the United States in March 1989. Secretary of State Madeleine Albright visited Mongolia in May 1998, and Prime Minister Enkhbayar visited Washington in November 2001. Deputy Secretary of State Richard L. Armitage visited Mongolia in January 2004, and President Bagabandi came to Washington for a meeting with President George W. Bush in July 2004. President Bush, Mrs. Bush, and Secretary of State Condoleezza Rice visited Mongolia in November 2005. It was the first ever visit of a U.S. President to Mongolia. Defense Secretary Donald Rumsfeld visited in October 2005 and Speaker of the House of Representatives Dennis Hastert visited Mongolia in August 2005. Agriculture Secretary Johanns led a presidential delegation in July 2006 in conjunction with Mongolia's celebration of its 800th anniversary. President Enkhbayar visited the White House in October 2007 and the two presidents signed the Millennium Challenge Compact for Mongolia. In 2008, the IRS presented a discussion of US Federal income tax to Director General Zorig Luvsandash from the General Department of National Taxation of the Republic of Mongolia. In August 2011, Joe Biden made the first visit to Mongolia by a sitting U.S. Vice President since Henry Wallace toured the region in 1944. |

== East Asia ==
| Country | Formal Relations Began | Notes |
|---|---|---|
| People's Republic of China | 1949-10-16 | Further information: People's Republic of China – Mongolia relations Mongolian President Ukhnaagiin Khürelsükh with Chinese President Xi Jinping and Russian President Vladimir Putin in Beijing, China, on 2 September 2025 In the Post–Cold War era, China has taken major steps to normalize its relationship with Mongolia, emphasizing its respect for Mongolia's sovereignty and independence. In 1994, Chinese Premier Li Peng signed a treaty of friendship and cooperation. China has become Mongolia's biggest trade partner and source of foreign investment as well as the destination for 48% of Mongolian exports. Bilateral trade reached US$1.13 billion by the first nine months of 2007, registering an increase of 90% from 2006. China offered to allow the use of its Tianjin port to give Mongolia and its goods access to trade with the Asia Pacific region. China also expanded its investments in Mongolia's mining industries, seeking to develop the country's natural resources industry. Mongolia and China have stepped up cooperation on fighting terrorism and bolstering regional security. China is likely to support Mongolia's membership in to the Asia Cooperation Dialogue (ACD), Asia-Pacific Economic Cooperation (APEC) and granting it observer status in the Shanghai Cooperation Organisation. |
| Republic of China (Taiwan) | none | Main article: Mongolia–Taiwan relations As the Republic of China did not recognize Mongolia until 1945, both countries did not exchange any diplomats between 1946 and 1949, and Mongolia recognized the People's Republic of China in 1949, there have never been formal diplomatic relations between Mongolia and the Republic of China. Until the 1990s, the Republic of China still considered Mongolia part of its territory. The Republic of China (currently on Taiwan) has not renounced claim to Mongolia as one of its provinces, primarily out of concern that such a move would be viewed as a precursor to renouncing sovereignty over all of Mainland China and Taiwan independence. In 2002 several ROC officials and government agencies passed laws and made strong statements recognizing Mongolia's sovereignty over the area (unofficially). "Outer Mongolia" was removed from the ROC's official maps and a representative office was established in Ulaanbaatar. Citizens of the Republic of China may travel to Mongolia using Republic of China passports (as is the case for most countries except the PRC), but Mongolian visas are stapled into (and not applied directly onto) the passport and Mongolian immigration authorities stamp the stapled visa instead of the passport. This is also the case for Hong Kong visas and entry/exit stamps. |
| Japan | 1972-02-24 | Main article: Japan–Mongolia relations Japan has been a major ally of Mongolia since the advent of democracy in 1991, and remains the largest single donor. Japanese aid and loans to Mongolia between 1991 and 2003 equal $1.2 billion, equaling 70 percent of total aid and loans. The two countries established a cultural exchange dialogue in 1974, a trade agreement in 1990, an air relations agreement in 1993, and an investment agreement in 2003. Trade between Mongolia and Japan in the first ten months of 2004 was $83.3 million. In addition, about 500 Mongolian students study in Japan. Mongolian President Tsakhiagiin Elbegdorj visited Japan in 2011, and the two countries made a joint announcement regarding a strategic alliance. In 1991, Japanese Prime Minister Toshiki Kaifu visited Mongolia, becoming the first to do so. Mongolian President Natsagiin Bagabandi first visited Japan in 1998. Mongolia has an embassy in Tokyo, established in 1973. Japan has an embassy in Ulaanbaatar.: Japanese Ministry of Foreign Affairs - Mongolia; Bilateral relations between Mongolia and Japan (in Mongolian) |
| North Korea | 1948-10-15 | Further information: Mongolia – North Korea relations Mongolia has an embassy in North Korea. Relations date back to 1948, when Mongolia recognised Kim Il Sung's Soviet-backed government in the North. North Korean refugees are a delicate issue between the two governments. In 2005, South Korean charity groups received from the Mongolian government an allocation of 1.3 square kilometres of land at an unspecified location 40 kilometres outside of Ulaanbaatar to establish a refugee camp. However, as of November 2006, Miyeegombyn Enkhbold, Mongolia's prime minister, officially denied the existence of such camps. One scholar estimated that 500 North Korean refugees enter Mongolia each month, along with some legal migrant labourers who come under an inter-governmental agreement to work in light industry and infrastructure projects. |
| South Korea | 1990-03-26 | Further information: Mongolia – South Korea relations Mongolians in South Korea form the largest population of Mongolian citizens abroad.. Their numbers were estimated at 33,000 as of 2008. South Korea established an embassy in Ulaanbaatar in 1990. Mongolia established its embassy in Seoul in 1991. The relationship between the two countries has been defined by the Joint Mongolia-South Korean notice made during the visit of South Korean president Kim Dae-jung to Mongolia in 1990. |

== South East Asia ==
| Country | Formal Relations Began | Notes |
|---|---|---|
| Cambodia | 1960-11-30 | Mongolia is accredited to Cambodia through its embassy in Vientiane, Laos.; Cambodia is accredited to Mongolia through its embassy in Beijing, China. |
| Indonesia | 1956-12-21 | Main article: Indonesia–Mongolia relations: Indonesia and Mongolia formally established diplomatic relations in 1956, marked by President Sukarno's state visit to Ulaanbaatar in the same year.; For diplomatic affairs, the Embassy of the Republic of Indonesia in Beijing, China, doubles as the Indonesian representative for Mongolia. Meanwhile, Mongolia has an embassy in Jakarta and honorary consulates in Jakarta and Surabaya. |
| Malaysia | 1971-09-08 | Main article: Malaysia–Mongolia relations Mongolia did not present an ambassador to Malaysia for seven years due to the murder of a Mongolian citizen in the country, but later decided to appoint an ambassador in 2014. |
| Singapore | 1970-06-11 | Main article: Mongolia–Singapore relations: Mongolia has an embassy in Singapore.; The Embassy of Singapore accredited to Mongolia is in Seoul.; Around 20 Singaporeans live in Mongolia; 4,804 Singaporeans visited Mongolia in 2017–2018.; Around 250 Mongolians live in Singapore; 7,196 Mongolians visited Singapore in 2017–2018. |
| Vietnam | 1954-11-17 | Further information: Mongolia–Vietnam relations The two countries established diplomatic ties in 1954. Mongolia has an embassy in Vietnam. The countries signed a Friendship and Cooperation Treaty in 1961, renewed it in 1979, and signed a new one in 1995. On 13 January 2003, the countries signed an 8-point cooperative document committing to cooperation between the two governments and their legislative bodies, replacing an earlier document signed in 1998. |

== South Asia ==
| Country | Formal Relations Began | Notes |
|---|---|---|
| Afghanistan | 1962-02-01 | In December 2013 Mongolia re-established its embassy in Kabul. |
| India | 1955-12-24 | Further information: India–Mongolia relations PM Narendra Modi and the President of Mongolia, Khurelsukh Ukhnaa witnessing the Exchange of MoUs between India and Mongolia on 14 October 2025 India established diplomatic relations in December 1955. India was the first country outside the Soviet bloc to establish diplomatic relations with Mongolia. Since then, there have been treaties of mutual friendship and cooperation between the two countries in 1973, 1994, 2001 and 2004. |

== Russia, Central Asia and West Asia ==
| Country | Formal Relations Began | Notes |
|---|---|---|
| Armenia | 1992-02-11 | Both countries established diplomatic relations on 11 February 1992.; Armenia is represented in Mongolia through its embassy in Beijing, China.; Mongolia is represented in Armenia through its embassy in Moscow, Russia. |
| Azerbaijan | | Azerbaijan is accredited to Mongolia from its embassy in Seoul, South Korea.; Mongolia is accredited to Azerbaijan from its embassy in Ankara, Turkey. |
| Kazakhstan | 1992-01-22 | Further information: Kazakhstan–Mongolia relations Mongolia has an embassy in Astana and a consulate general in Almaty. Kazakhstan has an embassy in Ulaanbaatar. Ethnic Kazakhs make up the only significant ethnic minority in Mongolia. |
| Kyrgyzstan | 1992-04-22 | Further information: Kyrgyzstan–Mongolia relations Mongolian president Tsakhiagiin Elbegdorj made an official visit to Kyrgyzstan in 2012. |
| Qatar | 1998-01-21 | In 2020, Mongolia signed a memorandum of understanding with Qatar to establish political consultations between the ministries of foreign affairs of both the countries. |
| Russia | 1921-11-05 | Further information: Mongolia–Russia relations Mongolian President Ukhnaagiin Khürelsükh with Russian President Vladimir Putin in Moscow, 7 May 2025 Relations between Mongolia and the Russian Federation have been traditionally strong since the Communist era, when Soviet Russia was the closest ally of the Mongolian People's Republic. Russia has an embassy in Ulaanbaatar and two consulate generals (in Darkhan and Erdenet). Mongolia has an embassy in Moscow, three consulate generals (in Irkutsk, Kyzyl and Ulan Ude), and a branch in Yekaterinburg. Both countries are full members of the Organization for Security and Co-operation in Europe (Russia is a participating state, while Mongolia is a partner). After the disintegration of the former Soviet Union, Mongolia developed relations with the new independent states. Links with Russia and other republics were essential to contribute to stabilisation of the Mongolian economy. The primary difficulties in developing fruitful coordination occurred because these new states were experiencing the same political and economic restructuring as Mongolia. Despite these difficulties, Mongolia and Russia successfully negotiated both a 1991 Joint Declaration of Cooperation and a bilateral trade agreement. This was followed by a 1993 Treaty of Friendship and Cooperation establishing a new basis of equality in the relationship. Mongolian President Bagabandi visited Moscow in 1999, and Russian President Vladimir Putin visited Mongolia in 2000 in order to sign the 25-point Ulaanbaatar Declaration, reaffirming Mongol-Russian friendship and cooperation on numerous economic and political issues. Putin visited Mongolia in September 2024, his first trip to an ICC member country since the court issued an arrest warrant for him over war crimes related to the deportation of Ukrainian children. Despite ICC obligations to detain him, Mongolia did not publicly respond to these calls. |
| Syria | 1967-07-31 | Ties between Mongolia and Syria were established on 31 July 1967, when both countries had socialist governments. Mongolian delegates (from the then-ruling Mongolian People's Revolutionary Party) traveled to Syria in 1978, 1982, and 1985, while Syrian (Arab Socialist Ba'ath Party) delegates visited Mongolia in 1983 and 1986. Bilateral relations between Mongolia and Syria (in Mongolian) |
| Tajikistan | 1992-04-24 | Mongolia is accredited to Tajikistan through its embassy in Nur-Sultan, Kazakhstan.; Tajikistan is accredited to Mongolia through its embassy in Nur-Sultan, Kazakhstan. |
| Turkey | 1969-06-24 | See Mongolia–Turkey relations: Mongolia has an embassy in Ankara.; Turkey has an embassy in Ulaanbaatar.; Both countries are members of Asia Cooperation Dialogue and WTO.; Trade volume between the two countries was 39.7 million US$ in 2019 (Mongolian exports/imports: 0.5/39.2 million USD.; There are around 134 Turks who live in Mongolia. |
| Uzbekistan | 1992-01-25 | Uzbekistan is accredited to Mongolia through its embassy in Beijing, China.; Mongolia is accredited to Uzbekistan through its embassy in Ankara, Turkey. |

== Europe ==
Mongolia seeks closer relations with countries in Europe and hopes to receive most-favoured-nation status from the European Union (EU). During 1991, Mongolia signed investment promotion and protection agreements with Germany and France and an economic cooperation agreement with the United Kingdom. Germany continued former East German cooperative programs and also provided loans and aid.

| Country | Formal Relations Began | Notes |
|---|---|---|
| European Union | 1989-08-01 | |
| Austria | 1963-07-01 | Austria is accredited to Mongolia from its embassy in Beijing, China.; Mongolia has an embassy in Vienna. |
| Belgium | 1971-07-08 | The Benelux (Belgium, Luxembourg, and the Netherlands) is represented in Mongolia through embassies in Beijing (China). Mongolia has an embassy in Brussels. |
| Bulgaria | 1950-04-22 | Further information: Bulgaria–Mongolia relations Bulgaria has an embassy in Ulaanbaatar. Mongolia has an embassy in Sofia. Diplomatic relations between the two counties were first initiated on 22 April 1950. Due to the similar ideological situation in both countries, their relations witnessed a steady development up until the 1990s. Bilateral relations somewhat deteriorated for the next ten years. Since 2001, they have been on a more positive track, with Bulgarian president Georgi Parvanov making an official visit to Ulaanbaatar in the summer of 2007. Until the beginning of the 1990s Bulgaria was Mongolia's 3rd biggest trading partner. Agricultural products and light industry goods were the main exports. Due to the subsequent economical and political changes in both countries the volume of trade shrank considerably. The volume of trade between Bulgaria and Mongolia totaled $2 million for 2008, with the main exporter being Bulgaria. |
| Croatia | 1993-03-10 | Croatia is accredited to Mongolia from its embassy in Beijing, China.; Mongolia is accredited to Croatia from its embassy in Vienna, Austria. |
| Cyprus | 1973-12-19 | Both countries established diplomatic relations on 19 December 1973.; Cyprus is represented in Mongolia through its embassy in Beijing, China.; Mongolia is represented in Cyprus through its embassy in Sofia, Bulgaria. |
| Czech Republic | 1993-01-01 | Further information: Czech Republic – Mongolia relations Diplomatic relations between Mongolia and Czechoslovakia commenced on 25 April 1950. In the 1980s, Czechoslovakia was Mongolia's second-largest trading partner, behind the Soviet Union. After the 1992 dissolution of Czechoslovakia, Mongolia reaffirmed its relations with the newly formed Czech Republic in 1993. However, in the 1990s, trade volumes declined sharply, though the Czech Republic still accounts for about 1% of Mongolia's imports. The Embassy of the Czech Republic in Ulaanbaatar was formally reopened in 1999. As of 2005, annual bilateral trade between the two countries was valued at US$5 million. The Czech government has also been involved in various water supply development programs in Mongolia. |
| Denmark | 1968-08-05 | Mongolia has a general consulate in Copenhagen.; Denmark has one general consulate in Ulaanbaatar. |
| France | | Further information: France–Mongolia relations: France has an embassy in Ulaanbaatar.; Mongolia has an embassy in Paris. |
| Germany | 1974-01-31 | Further information: Germany – Mongolia relations Mongolia established ties with the Federal Republic of Germany in 1974, with embassies in Ulaanbaatar and Berlin |
| Greece | 1967-03-03 | Greece is represented in Mongolia through its embassy in Beijing (China). Mongolia is represented in Greece through its embassy in Sofia (Bulgaria) and an honorary consulate in Athens. |
| Hungary | 1950-04-28 | Hungary has an embassy in Ulaanbaatar. Mongolia has an embassy in Budapest. |
| Italy | | Italy has an embassy in Ulaanbaatar.; Mongolia has an embassy in Rome. |
| Kosovo | none | Mongolia does not recognize Kosovo as a country. |
| Montenegro | 2006 | Further information: Mongolia–Montenegro relations |
| Netherlands | 1972-03-06 | The Benelux (Belgium, Luxembourg, and the Netherlands) is represented in Mongolia through embassies in Beijing (China). Mongolia has an honorary consulate in Breda. |
| Poland | 1950-04-14 | Further information: Mongolia–Poland relations Mongolia has an embassy in Warsaw and an honorary consulate in Kraków. Poland has an embassy in Ulaanbaatar and an honorary consulate in Erdenet. |
| Portugal | | Mongolia is accredited to Portugal from its embassy in Paris, France.; Portugal is accredited to Mongolia from its embassy in Beijing, China. |
| Romania | 1950-04-29 | The Romanian embassy in Mongolia was closed in 1995, and the Mongolian one in Bucharest in 1997.; Romania has an honorary consulate in Ulaanbaatar, with diplomatic representation being handled by the Romanian embassy in Beijing, China.; Mongolia has an honorary consulate in Bucharest, with diplomatic representation being handled by the Mongolian embassy in Sofia, Bulgaria.; Chairman Yumjaagiin Tsedenbal visited Bucharest on 9 September 1957 and President Nicolae Ceaușescu visited Ulaanbaatar on 21–24 June 1971. |
| Slovakia | | Mongolia is accredited to Slovakia from its embassy in Prague, the Czech Republic.; Slovakia is accredited to Mongolia from its embassy in Beijing, China. |
| Sovereign Military Order of Malta | none | |
| Spain | | Mongolia is accredited to Spain from its embassy in Paris, France.; Spain is accredited to Mongolia from its embassy in Beijing, China. |
| Sweden | | Mongolia has an embassy in Stockholm.; Sweden is accredited to Mongolia from its embassy in Beijing, China. |
| Ukraine | 1992-01-21 | Mongolia is represented in Ukraine through its embassy in Poland. An embassy previously existed in Kyiv but was closed and replaced with a consular department.; Ukraine is represented in Mongolia through its embassy in China. |
| United Kingdom | 1963-01-23 | Further information: Mongolia–United Kingdom relations British Foreign Secretary David Cameron with Mongolian Foreign Minister Battsetseg Batmunkh in Ulaanbaatar, April 2024. Mongolia established diplomatic relations with the United Kingdom on 23 January 1963.: Mongolia maintains an embassy in London.; The United Kingdom is accredited to Monglia through its embassy in Ulaanbaatar.; Both countries share common membership of the International Criminal Court, the United Nations, and the World Trade Organization. Bilaterally the two countries have an Air Services Agreement, a Development Partnership, a Double Taxation Agreement, and an Investment Agreement. |

== Oceania ==
| Country | Formal Relations Began | Notes |
|---|---|---|
| Australia | 1972-09-15 | Main article: Australia–Mongolia relations The Mongolian Consulate was established in Canberra in March 1997. An embassy was established in October 2008. Sükhbaataryn Batbold became the first head of government to visit Australia in 2011. Australia opened its embassy in Ulaanbaatar in December 2015. |

== International organisation participation ==
AsDB, ASEAN (observer), ASEM, CICA, ESCAP, FAO, G-77, IAEA, IBRD, ICAO, ICCt, ICFTU, ICRM, IDA, IFAD, IFC, IFRCS, ILO, IMF, IMO, Intelsat, Interpol, IOC, ISO, ITU, NAM, OPCW, OSCE, UN, UNCTAD, UNESCO, UNIDO, UPU, WCO, WHO, WIPO, WMO, WToO, WTrO, SCO (observer)

Mongolia did not join the UN until 1961 because of repeated threats to veto by the Republic of China, which considered Mongolia to be part of its territory (see China and the United Nations).

Mongolia has been a member of the Forum of Small States (FOSS) since the group's founding in 1992.

== See also ==
- List of diplomatic missions in Mongolia
- List of diplomatic missions of Mongolia
- Visa requirements for Mongolian citizens
