= Mongolia–Poland relations =

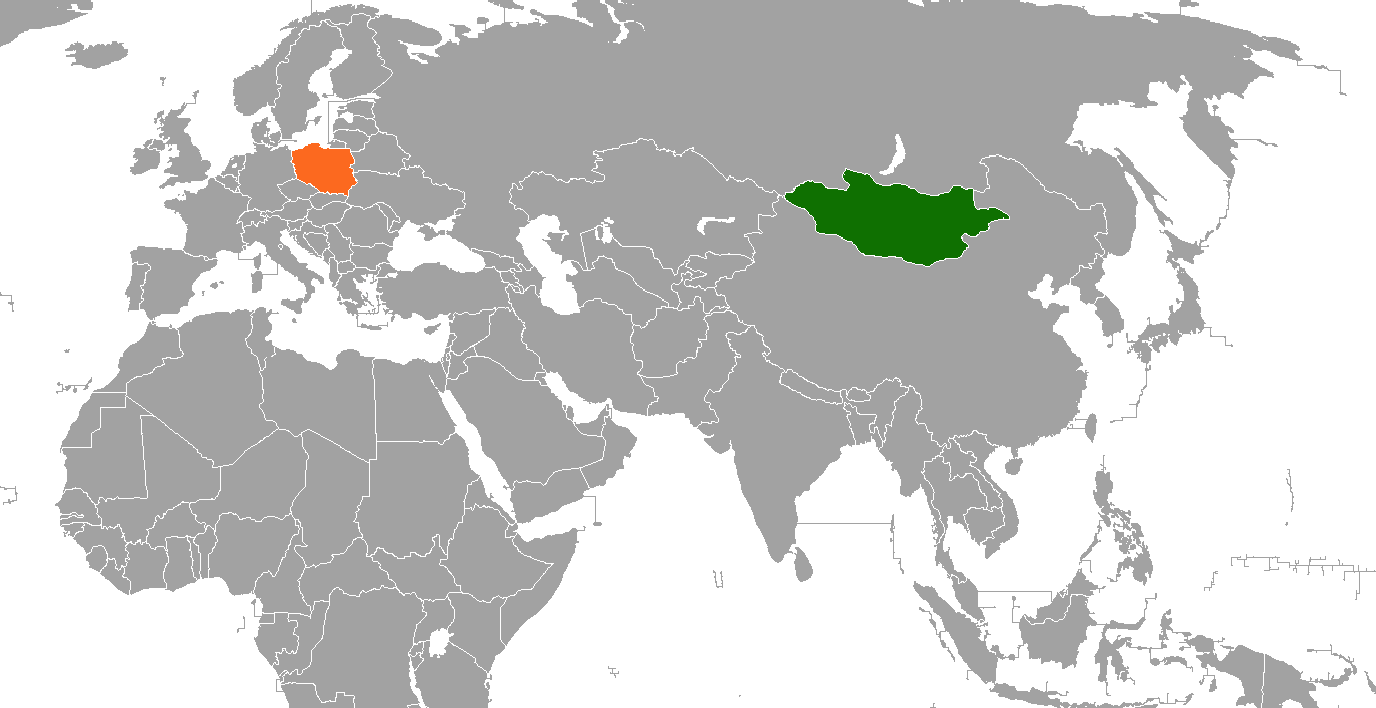

- Mongolia: Poland

Mongolia–Poland relations are the bilateral relations between Mongolia and Poland. The countries enjoy good relations, based on growing trade, and political and investment cooperation. Both nations are full members of the World Trade Organization and United Nations.

== History ==
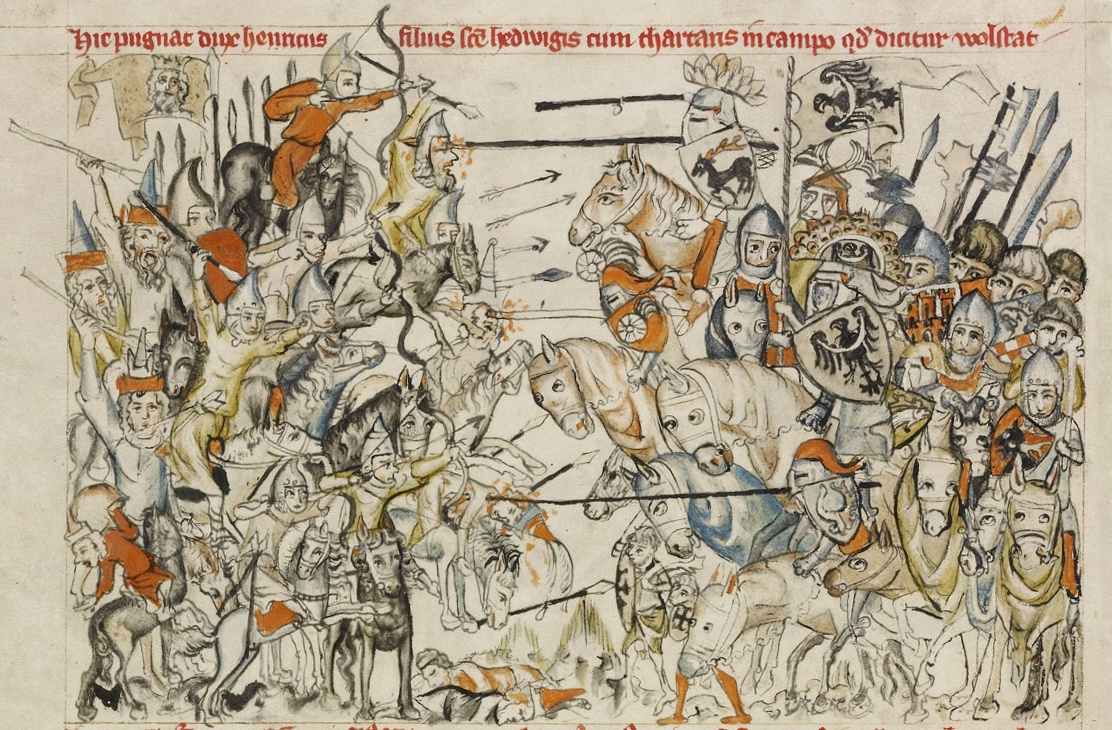
Battle of Legnica (1241)

Following the conquests of Batu Khan the Mongol Empire bordered Poland in the 13th century. Poland endured three Mongol invasions, in 1240–1241, 1259–1260 and 1287–1288, however, unlike the more-eastern territories, it was not subjugated by the Mongols and retained its independence. In 1245, in Wrocław, Polish friars Benedict of Poland and C. de Bridia joined Giovanni da Pian del Carpine in his journey to the seat of Güyük Khan. It was the first ever trip by western Europeans to the Mongol capital, and was later described in de Bridia's Tartar Relation of 1247, one of pioneering European works on the history and customs of the Mongols. The envoys also carried gifts from Duke Konrad I of Masovia to the Mongol Khan. The delegation returned to Europe with the Letter from Güyük Khan to Pope Innocent IV.

After the division of the Mongol Empire and the fall of its successor hordes in Eastern Europe, Mongol-Polish contacts became scarce given the separating distance. Later on, both nations shared a similar fate, with the Mongol realm being divided between the Manchus and Russians in the 17th century, and Poland divided between Russia, Prussia and Austria in the late 18th century. As a result, several Polish deportees from the Russian Partition of Poland visited Mongolia in the 19th century, including orientalist Józef Kowalewski, geologist Aleksander Czekanowski and naturalist Benedykt Dybowski (for more, see Polish–Mongolian literary relations). Józef Kowalewski is considered the founder of Poland's Mongolian studies. Intense trade between Poland and Mongolia dates back to the 19th century, when more than half of Russian exports to Mongolia contained Polish products from Warsaw, Łódź and Białystok in the Russian Partition of Poland. The trade was interrupted by World War I.

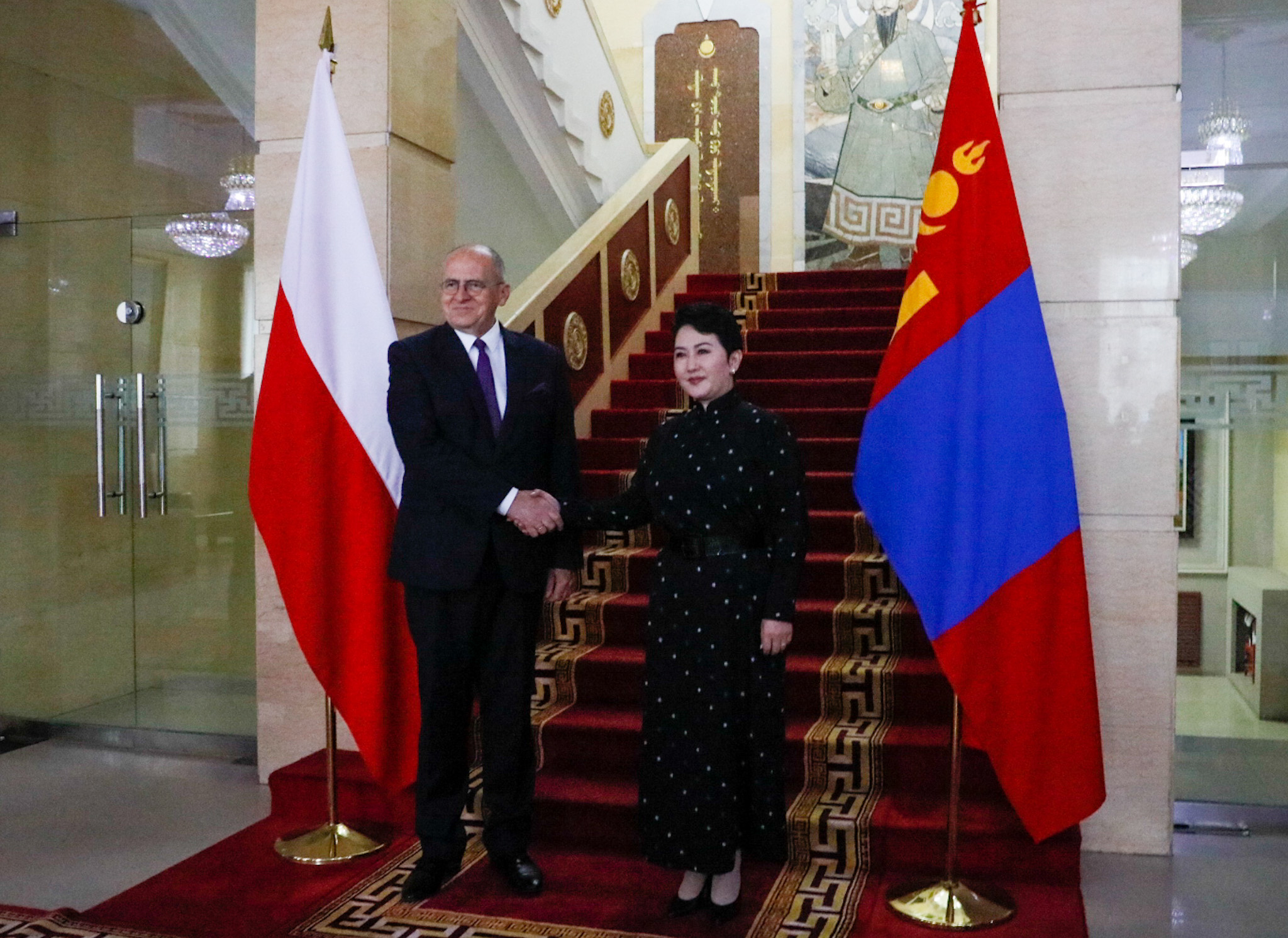
Minister of Foreign Affairs of Poland Zbigniew Rau and Minister of Foreign Affairs of Mongolia Battsetseg Batmunkh in 2022

Both nations regained independence in the early 20th century. Michał Aleksander Wołłosowicz then organized a modern custom office in Mongolia, and in 1921 he became an envoy of Poland in Urga. In the 1920s, Mongolia was home to more than a dozen Polish families. In both countries the Soviet Union eventually installed communist regimes, resulting in vast repressions of its citizens. The post-World War II period saw the development of relations in which Poland assisted Mongolia's industrial development by building factories and participating in geological surveys in search of natural resources. Eight joint paleontological expeditions of the Mongolian Academy of Sciences and Polish Academy of Sciences to the Gobi Desert in Mongolia were conducted in 1963–1971.

Following the Fall of Communism in Poland, Mongolian anti-communist oppositionists established contacts with members of the Polish Solidarity, and a group of Poles flew to Mongolia to assist the Mongolian Revolution of 1990. After its success, cooperation continued. Polish constitutionalists helped draft the still-effective Constitution of Mongolia of 1992.

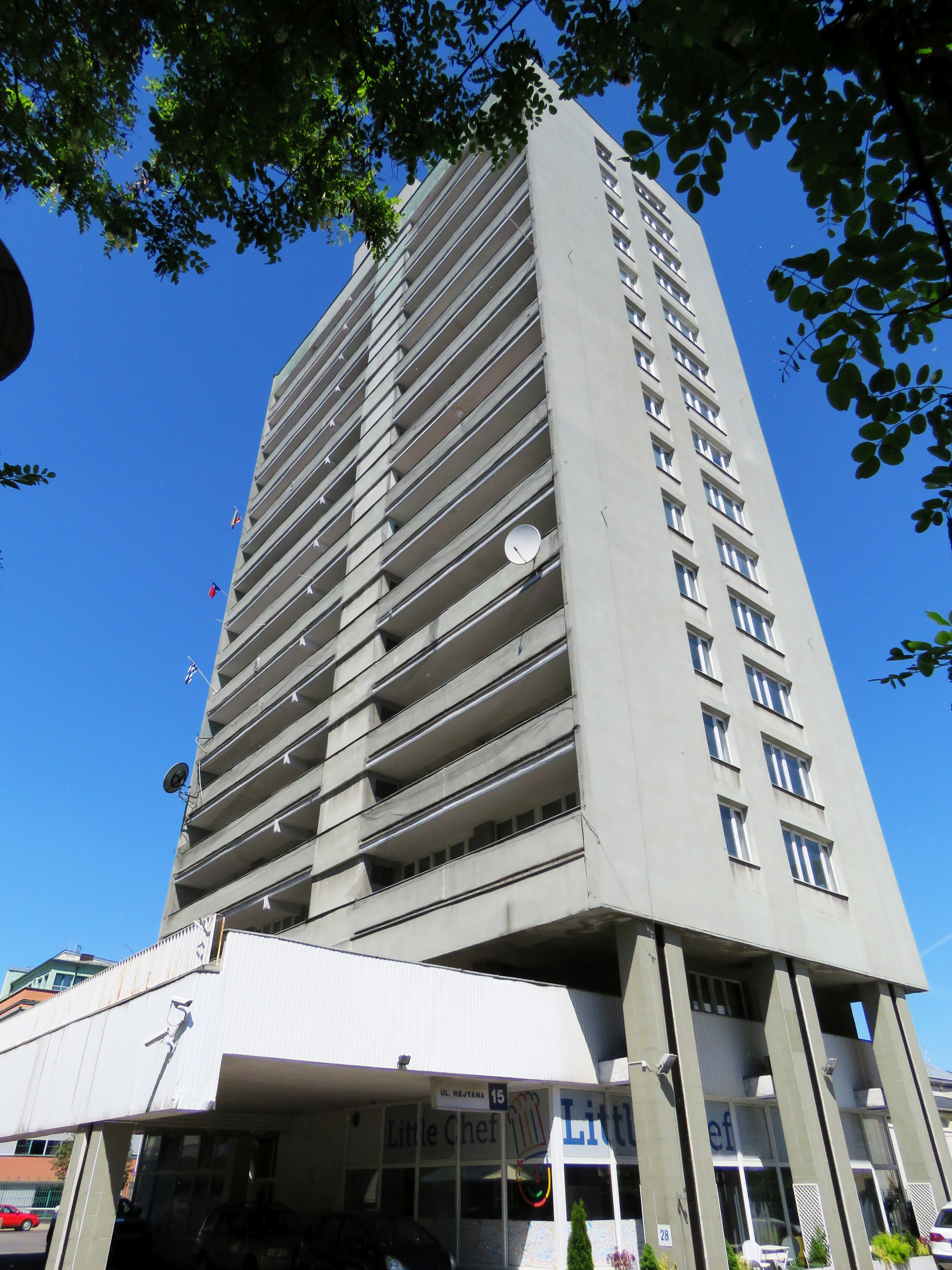
Embassy of Mongolia in Warsaw

== Agreements ==
The first cultural cooperation agreement between Mongolia and Poland was signed in Warsaw in 1958. It was replaced by a new agreement in 1974, and another one in 2002. By a 1975 agreement, visa requirements were reciprocally lifted. A double tax avoidance agreement was signed between the two countries in Ulaanbaatar in 1978.

== Economic relations ==
In 2020, Poland was the second largest source of imports from the European Union to Mongolia, and the seventh largest worldwide.

== Military relations ==
The Polish Armed Forces take part in the annual Khaan Quest military exercise in Mongolia. In 2013, a defense cooperation agreement was signed in Warsaw.

== Resident diplomatic missions ==
- Mongolia has an embassy in Warsaw.
- Poland has an embassy in Ulaanbaatar.

== See also ==
- Foreign relations of Mongolia
- Foreign relations of Poland
