= Australia–Mongolia relations =

- Australia: Mongolia

Diplomatic mission
- Embassy of Australia, Ulaanbaatar: Embassy of Mongolia, Canberra

Envoy
- Ambassador: Ambassador

Bilateral relations exist between Australia and Mongolia. Diplomatic ties were established in 1972, with ties focusing on education, mining, and developmental assistance.

== History ==
At the time of Australian federation in 1901, Mongolia (as well as China) was part of the Manchu Qing Empire. The succeeding Republic of China lost effective control of Mongolia in 1921 and an independence referendum was held in 1945. The Republic of China also lost control of mainland China itself around 1949–1950, retreating to Taiwan, but for a time Australia continued to recognise its claim to represent the whole of China and Mongolia. Australia only recognised Mongolia as independent from the Republic of China (Taiwan) in February 1967, despite Taiwanese objections. Mongolia was only the second Communist state Australia had recognised, after the Soviet Union.

The two countries established official diplomatic relations on 15 September 1972.

== High level visits ==
The Governor-General of Australia Bill Hayden visited Mongolia in 1994, and the President of Mongolia Punsalmaagiin Ochirbat visited Australia in 1997.

In February 2011, Prime Minister of Mongolia Sükhbaataryn Batbold became the first Mongolian head of government to visit Australia.

In September 2023 Mongolian Foreign Minister Batmunkh Battsetseg visited Canberra on a 4 day diplomatic visit at the invitation of Australian Foreign Minister Penny Wong. Both the Mongolian Ambassador to Australia, Davaasuren Damdinsuren as well as the Mongolian Foreign Minister attended question time in the House of Representatives on the 13th of September 2023.

The Governor-General of Australia Samantha Mostyn visited Mongolia in 2025.

== People ==
Australia and Mongolia established reciprocal Work and Holiday Maker visas in 2022.

=== Australians ===
In 2013, The Australian reported that more than 650 Australians lived in Mongolia, with over 45 businesses conducting operations.

=== Mongolians ===
In the 2010 Mongolian National Census, 962 Mongolian citizens were recorded to have been living in Australia, while in 2017 the Australian ambassador remarked that there were about 2000 Mongolian students studying in Australia.

In 2018, the Australian Department of Foreign Affairs and Trade remarked that over 7000 Mongolian students were studying in Australia.

The 2021 Australian Census returned a figure of 5,397 people in Australia born in Mongolia, with 8.2% being Australian citizens.

The Mongolian Embassy gave a figure of 11,000 Mongolians living in Australia in April 2023.

== Culture ==
SBS Radio, a hybrid-funded Australian public service broadcaster, produces Mongolian-language podcasts, news articles, and radio broadcasts.

The Australian National University's Mongolia Institute was founded in 2013 to promote Mongolian studies in Oceania.

== Immigration to Australia ==
The 2011 Australian Census reported 668 Australians with Mongolian parents, with Mongolia ranking as the 7th fastest growing overseas birthplace, and Mongolian as the 9th fastest growing language. A total of 1,235 people were reported to have Mongolian ancestry.

The 2021 Australian Census reported 5,397 people born in Mongolia resident in Australia, of which 444 were Australian citizens, while there were a total of 7,808 people reporting Mongolian ancestry.

== Foreign aid ==
Australia's aid program to Mongolia involves education and support to the mining industry and governance, with a total of 10.9 million AUD allocated for aid in the 2017-18 period.

Over 560 Australia Awards postgraduate scholarships under AusAID have been awarded to Mongolians since the program began in 1993–1994.

== Defence ==
Australia participates in the annual Khaan Quest peacekeeping exercises hosted in Mongolia.

== Diplomatic missions ==
Mongolia opened an embassy in Canberra in 2008, while Australia opened an embassy in Ulaanbaatar in December 2015, previously having opened an Australian Trade Commission in 2011.

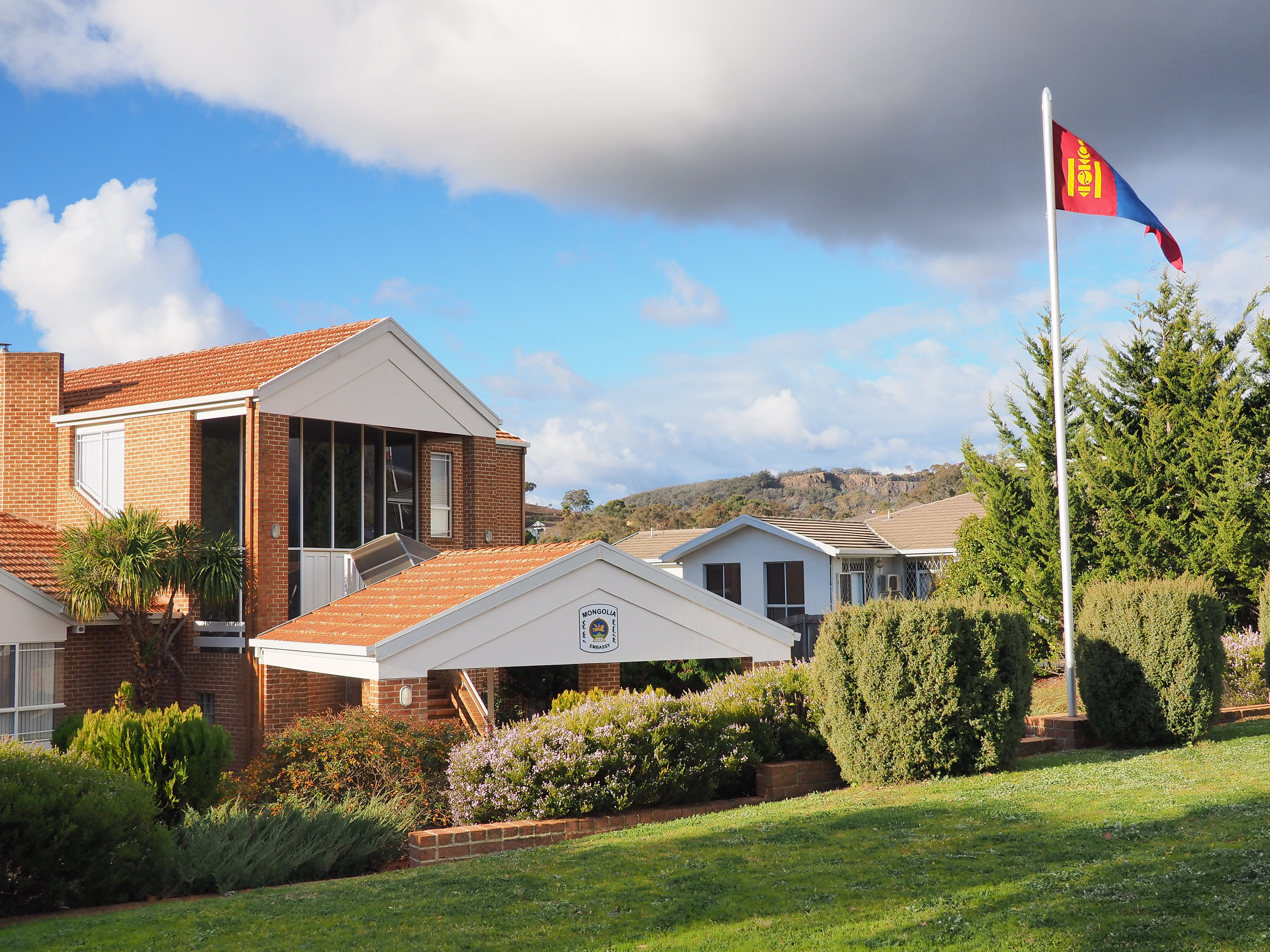
Embassy of Mongolia, Canberra

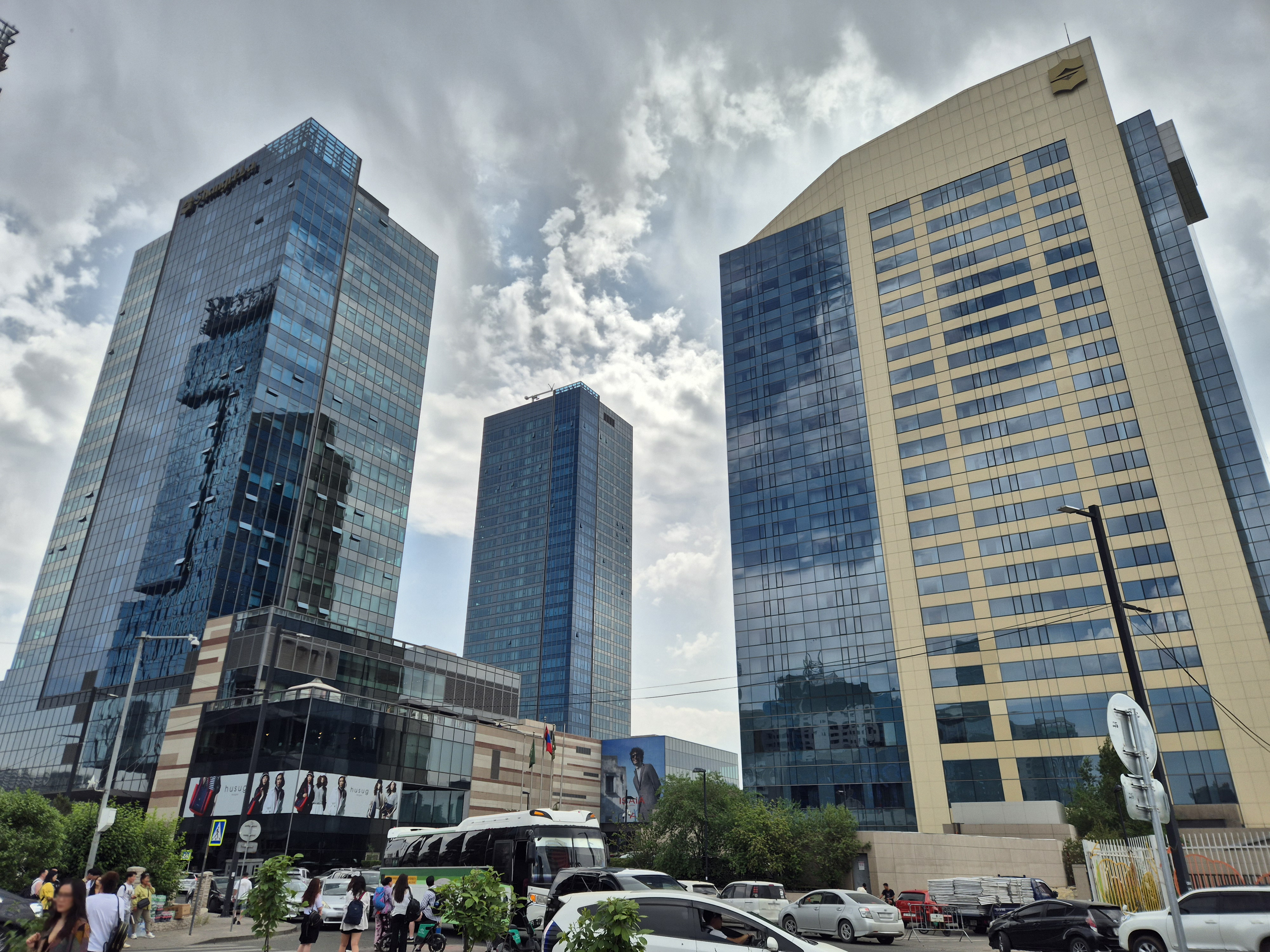
Embassy of Australia, Ulaanbaatar (Shangri-La Centre, Level 20)

== See also ==
- List of ambassadors of Australia to Mongolia
- Foreign relations of Australia
- Foreign relations of Mongolia
