= Kazakhstan–Mongolia relations =

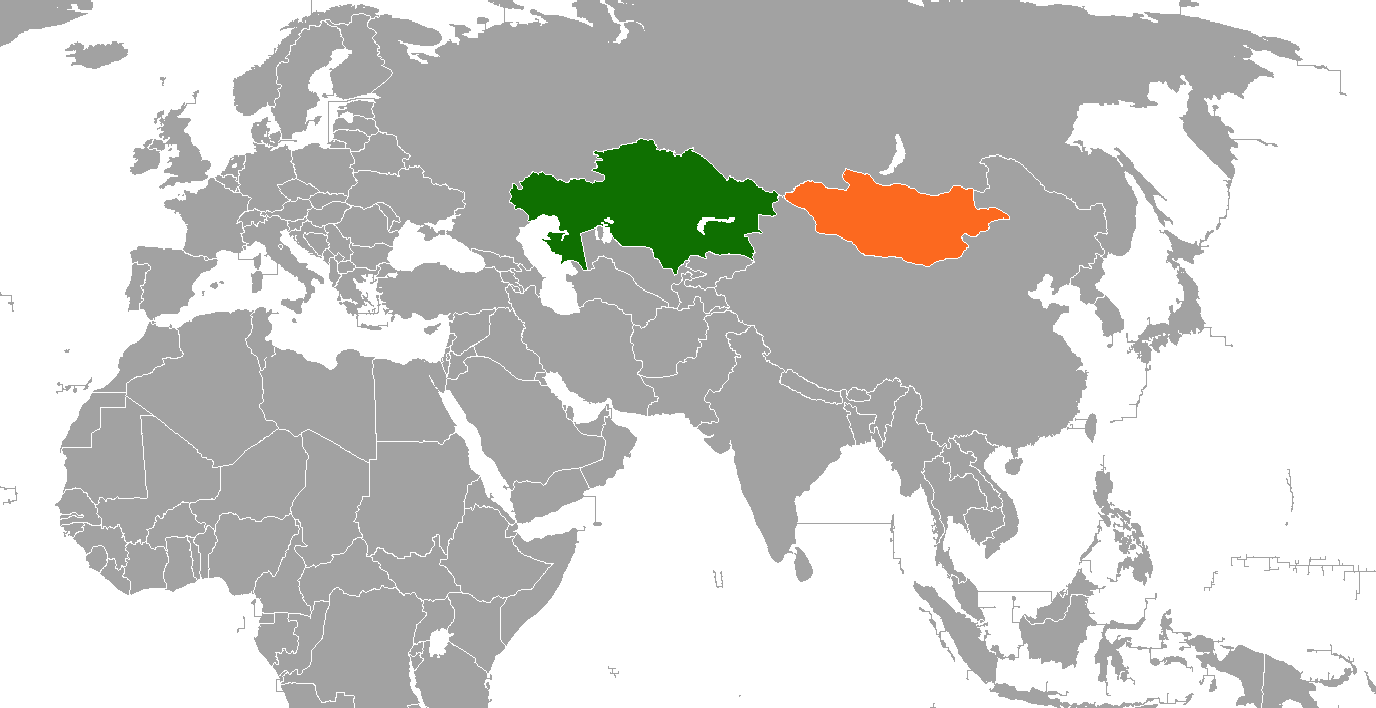

- Kazakhstan: Mongolia

Diplomatic mission
- Kazakh Embassy in Ulaanbaatar: Mongolian Embassy in Astana and Almaty

Kazakhstan–Mongolia relations refer to bilateral relations between the Republic of Kazakhstan and Mongolia. The two countries established diplomatic relations on 22 January 1992, after Kazakhstan gained independence from the Soviet Union.

The Embassy of Mongolia to Kazakhstan, Almaty opened in September 1992 and began operating in Astana in 2010. The diplomatic mission of Kazakhstan to Mongolia opened in 1992 in Ulaanbaatar. The mission was upgraded to an Embassy on 1 January 2007.

== History ==
While formal state relations were established only in the 1990s, cultural and historic relations between the two countries go back centuries.

=== Ancient and medieval times ===
The Xiongnu, a nomadic confederation that once terrorised the Han dynasty, was widely accepted as the ancestor of both modern Kazakhs and Mongols. Over time, they were intertwined together under various nomadic entities, until the rise of Genghis Khan, who became the first to unite nomadic Mongols and Turks (mainly Kipchaks) into one banner that would foster the future Mongol Empire, whose identity has been disputed to today (though most scholars consider Genghis Khan Mongolian).

It was from the time of Genghis Khan that the Kipchaks, by this time still the wanderers with fluid identity as either Kimeks or Cumans, started to be codified as a distinct Turkic people from fellow Western Turkic tribes Oghuz and Karluks. This was due to the Kipchaks were parts of the Golden Horde of Jochi and his son Batu Khan, and far away from the Arab, Persian, Indian, or Chinese political centres between Western, Southern and Eastern Asia. This resulted in a large chunk of Borjigin influences entered the Kipchak tribes, reinforcing their deep nomadic identity; despite subsequent Islamisation and Turkification of the Golden Horde, the deep-rooted Mongolisation of culture and heritage meant the Kipchaks became deeply associated to the legacy of Genghis Khan, as opposed to the Oghuz that opted to reject any connection to Mongols and the Karluks being too mixed with other Persianate, Chinese and Indian legacies. The fall of the Golden Horde in the 15th century did not diminish this heritage, as multiple smaller Kipchak-born Khanates (such as Kazan Khanate, Crimean Khanate, etc) or ethnic groups (Lipka Tatars, Karachays, Balkars, etc) all proclaimed themselves descendants of Genghis Khan's Borjigin lineage; the Kazakh Khanate itself was also run by the Töre family, a Turkified Chinggisid clan.

=== Kazakh and Oirat Khanates to modern era ===
In the 17th to 18th century, the Kazakh-led Kazakh Khanate fought wars against the Oirat-led Dzungar Khanate for the struggle of Eurasian steppe, with the Dzungars claimed themselves fighting to restore the Chinggisid power across the steppe world. At this point, the Qing dynasty and later on Russian Empire started to expand the power of China and Russia to the steppe world, and viewed both of them as a threat, making crushing the Kazakhs and Dzungars necessary for Chinese and Russian rulers; ultimately, both khanates were destroyed by the Chinese and Russians, and the lands of Kazakhs and Mongols were divided between the Russians and Chinese.

The 20th century brought turbulent for the Kazakhs and Mongols as they both suffered harshly as part of Eastern Bloc. The Mongols declared independence from the Chinese following the fall of Qing Empire, but the country was turned into a warzone by Chinese and later, Russian warlords, resulted in the creation of the first communist state outside Russia in 1924. However, Kazakh attempt to win back independence was brutally crushed, and the Soviet leadership deliberately starved Kazakhs in the 1930s, causing many Kazakhs to flee to already war-torn Xinjiang and made it to Mongolia. The Mongolian leadership, despite communism, had been more lenient to Kazakh refugees out of sympathy for fellow nomads, and Kazakhs were allowed to stay. After that, relations between Kazakhstan and Mongolia were nonexistent until 1991.

Today they share similar experiences with relations with Russia and China. In addition, both the Kazakh and the Mongolian languages are officially written in the Cyrillic alphabet, using identical letters. Mongolia's treatment of Kazakh minority has earned praise for being tolerant to a Muslim minority in a deeply Buddhist-Tengrist country.

== High level visits ==
In October 1993, then-President Nursultan Nazarbayev paid his first official visit to Mongolia. The Protocol on Cooperation between Khural of Mongolia and Mazhilis of Kazakhstan was signed in 2003. The first official visit of Mongolian President Natsagyn Bagabandi to Kazakhstan occurred in 1998. Nazarbayev was awarded the highest honor of Mongolia, the Order of Erdene Ochir ("The Precious Rod"), for his contribution to the development of bilateral relations during his official visit to Mongolia in the summer of 2008. Since the establishment of diplomatic relations in 1991, the two countries have signed more than 50 bilateral treaties and agreements.

In October 2019, Mongolian Prime Minister Ukhnaagiin Khürelsükh visited Nur-Sultan and met Kazakh Prime Minister Askar Mamin. It was the first visit by a Mongolian Prime Minister in 25 years.

In October 2021, Minister of Foreign Affairs of Mongolia Batmunkh Battsetseg visited Nur-Sultan and met Kazakh President Kassym-Jomart Tokayev.

== Trade and economic relations ==
Kazakhstan-Mongolian Intergovernmental Commission (IGC) on Trade, Economic, Scientific, Technological and Cultural cooperation was established to strengthen bilateral cooperation. Trade turnover in 2017 reached US$68.2 million, according to the Ministry of Finance of the Republic of Kazakhstan.

The main export goods from Kazakhstan to Mongolia are tobacco, cigarettes, lighters, sanitary and hygiene products, wheat and wheat-rye flour, and oil.

The main import goods of Mongolia to Kazakhstan are animal and vegetable products, textiles and textile products, wood, timber, pulp, and paper.

=== Aerospace ===
Kazakhstan’s aerospace cooperation with Mongolia expanded in 2024 with the signing of a contract to export a medium-resolution satellite to a Mongolian private company. This deal marked Kazakhstan’s first satellite export and added to an initially domestic satellite constellation project. The launch of the Mongolian satellite is expected around 2028. On 10 April 2025, Kazakh officials highlighted broader international collaboration in space technologies, including ongoing negotiations within the UN framework.

== Cultural and humanitarian cooperation ==
Some 10 agreements have been signed between Mongolia and Kazakhstan. Programs include exchange students program and in 2001, the East Kazakhstan State opened its branch in the city of Ulaanbaatar. 25 grants were awarded annually to citizens of Mongolia. The Kazakhstan government provided humanitarian aid of US$200,000 to the victims of the mud flow that happened on July 10, 2016.

== See also ==
- Foreign relations of Kazakhstan
- Foreign relations of Mongolia
- Turco-Mongol tradition
