= Mongolia–United Kingdom relations =

- Mongolia: United Kingdom

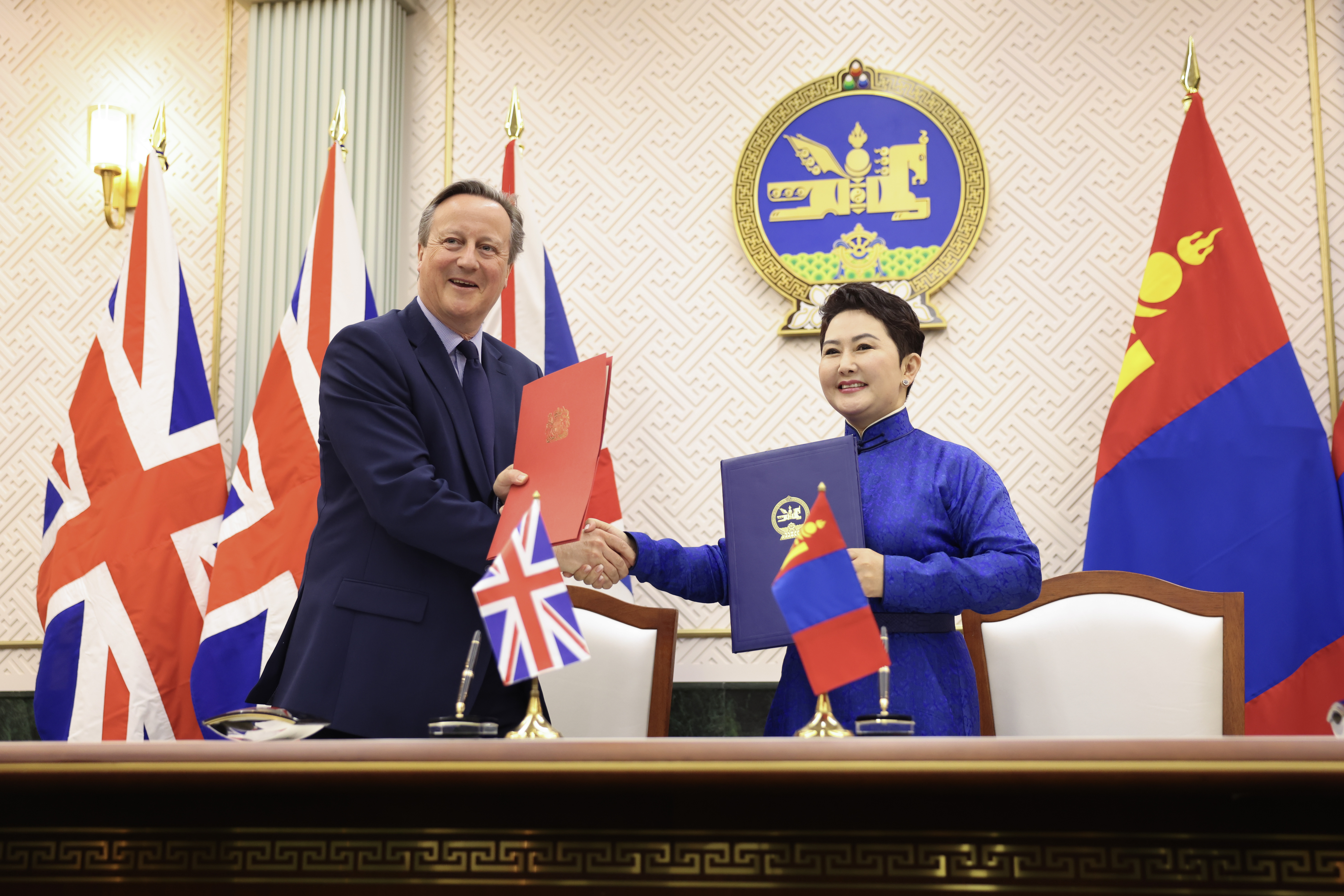
British Foreign Secretary David Cameron with Mongolian Foreign Minister Battsetseg Batmunkh in Ulaanbaatar, April 2024.

Mongolia–United Kingdom relations entail the diplomatic, historical, and bilateral relations between Mongolia and the United Kingdom of Great Britain and Northern Ireland. Both countries established diplomatic relations on 23 January 1963.

Both countries share common membership of the International Criminal Court, the United Nations, and the World Trade Organization. Bilaterally the two countries have an Air Services Agreement, a Development Partnership, a Double Taxation Agreement, and an Investment Agreement.

== History ==
Although the Kingdom of England and the Mongol Empire never engaged in direct military conflict, they were aware of each other by the late 13th century, The Mongols caused widespread fear, prompting European states to seek alliances and observe Mongol movements closely. England, geographically separated by the English Channel, was approach of the Mongols primarily through engaged in Papacy's communications limited diplomatic exchanges mediated through envoys and crusading correspondence. In 1287, Rabban Sawma, a Nestorian Christian envoy, traveled west from the Ilkhanate (Mongol Iran) to seek alliances with European rulers, including King Edward I of England, to counter Muslim powers in Egypt, indicate that Buscarello de Ghisolfi, an envoy of Ilkhan Arghun, delivered letters to Edward I in London in 1290, demonstrating English awareness of and willingness to consider a potential strategic alignment.

In 1963, the United Kingdom was the first Western country to establish diplomatic ties with Mongolia. In July 1989, Punsalmaagiin Ochirbat visited the United Kingdom and the two nations signed economic agreements.

Both countries have described their relationship as "close". The Prime Minister of Mongolia last visited the UK in July 2015, where he addressed Asia House. Hugo Swire also addressed Asia House and praised Mongolia's investments in tackling climate change and the abolition of the death penalty in 2012, describing Mongolia as a "a leading voice among its neighbours".

== Assistance and relationship ==
The United Kingdom has an embassy in Ulaanbaatar, while Mongolia has an embassy in London. The United Kingdom is the consular responsible for a number of EU and Commonwealth citizens. Fiona Blyth has served as British Ambassador since 2023, while Enkhsukh Battumur has served as Mongolian Ambassador since 2022.

Trade and investment ties are strong and fast-growing. British-Australian company Rio Tinto is operating the Oyu Tolgoi mine, one of the largest in the world. Around 7,000 British citizens visit Mongolia each year and around 4,000 Mongolians are resident in the UK.

== Diplomatic missions ==
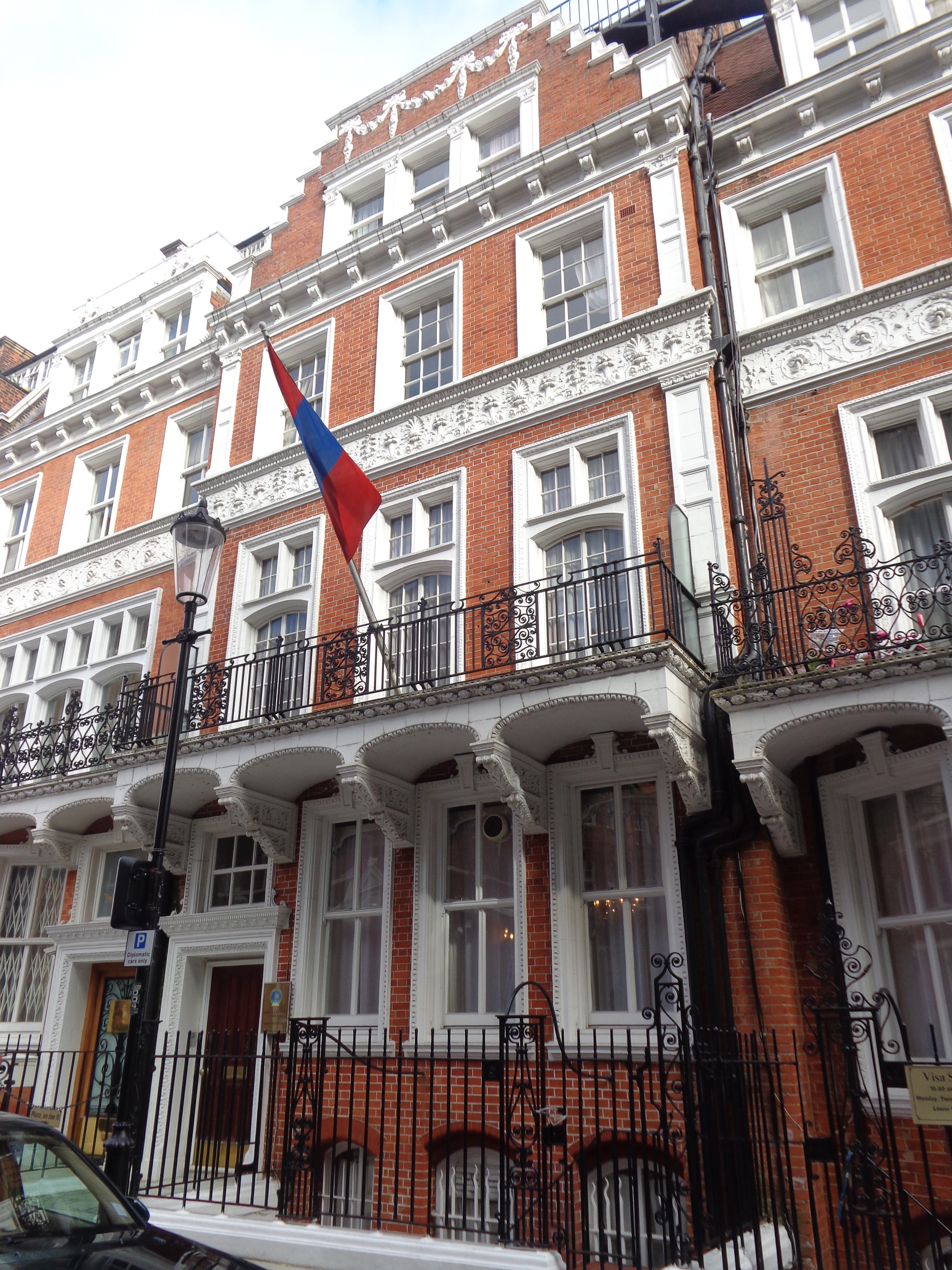
Mongolian embassy in London, United Kingdom.

- Mongolia maintains an embassy in London.
- The United Kingdom is accredited to Mongolia through its embassy in Ulaanbaatar.

== See also ==
- Embassy of Mongolia, London
- Foreign relations of Mongolia
- Foreign relations of the United Kingdom
