= Germany–Mongolia relations =

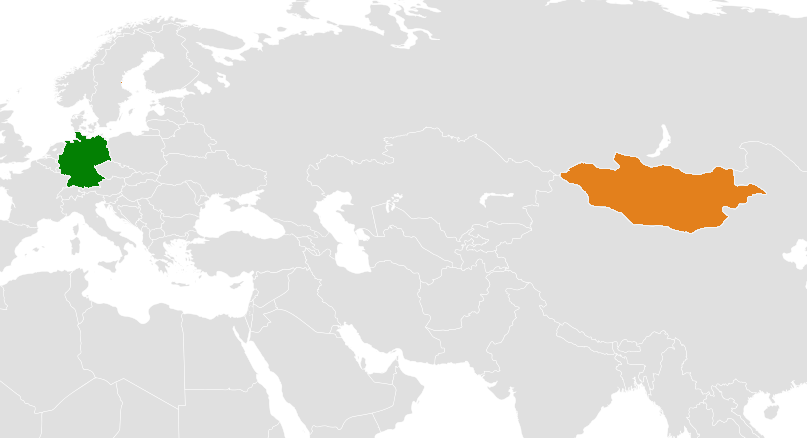

- Germany: Mongolia

Diplomatic mission
- Embassy of Germany, Ulaanbaatar: Embassy of Mongolia, Berlin

Germany–Mongolia relations are the bilateral relations between Germany and Mongolia. Historically, the Mongolian People's Republic had close ties to the German Democratic Republic, which has persisted to this day. Mongolia established ties with the Federal Republic of Germany in 1974.

== History ==
=== Early contacts ===
The earliest contact between Germanic and Mongol peoples are said to have occurred in 1241, during the Battle of Legnica, with the Mongols under Baidar proving victorious over a combined force of Poles, Moravians, and Germans, though the Mongols retreated back to Hungary shortly after.

=== 20th century ===
After declaring independence in 1911, Mongolia had made ultimately unsuccessful overtures to establish ties with Germany through its representative in Saint Petersburg. After the Mongolian Revolution of 1921, the Mongolian People's Party made establishing economic ties with Germany a high priority, and in 1927 the first batch of 50 Mongolian students, including Dashdorjiin Natsagdorj, the founding father of modern Mongolian literature, were sent to Germany and France for education.

=== Cold War ===
==== East Germany ====
Mongolia and East Germany established ties on April 13, 1950. The following high-level visits were undertaken between nations.

Year	Person	Office	Place
1955	Otto Grotewohl	Chairman of the Council of Ministers of East Germany	Ulaanbaatar
1957	Yumjaagiin Tsedenbal	General Secretary of the Mongolian People's Party	Berlin
1960	Heinrich Rau	Minister for Foreign Trade and Inter-German Trade	Ulaanbaatar
1968	Willi Stoph	Chairman of the Council of Ministers of East Germany	Ulaanbaatar
1969	Yumjaagiin Tsedenbal	General Secretary of the Mongolian People's Party	Berlin
1973	Erich Honecker	General Secretary of the Socialist Unity Party of Germany	Ulaanbaatar
1977	Yumjaagiin Tsedenbal	General Secretary of the Mongolian People's Party	Berlin
1989	Jambyn Batmönkh	General Secretary of the Mongolian People's Party	Berlin

In 1989, about 300 exhibits from Mongolian museums were organized in Munich, dedicated to the "art and culture of the Mongolian equestrian people".

==== West Germany ====
Mongolia-West Germany ties being established on January 31, 1974.

=== Post-communist era ===
Since the German reunification, a large number of visits have been held by various high-ranking German and Mongolian politicians and delegations. The following is a list of the most important state visits since 1990:

Year	Person	Office	Place
September 1990	Regierungsdelegation	Delegation from the Federal Ministry for Economic Cooperation and Development	Ulaanbaatar
June 1991	Tserenpil Gombosuren	Mongolian Foreign Minister	Berlin
September 1991	Dieter-Julius Cronenberg	Vice President of the German Bundestag	Ulaanbaatar
February 1992	Dashiin Byambasüren	Prime Minister of Mongolia	Berlin
August 1992	Carl-Dieter Spranger	Federal Minister for Economic Cooperation and Development	Berlin
January 1993	Natsagiin Bagabandi	Mongolian Speaker of Parliament	Berlin
November 1994	Lkhamsuren Enebisch	Deputy Prime Minister	Berlin
December 1994	Chojisuren Purevdorj	Deputy Prime Minister	Berlin
July 1995	Burkhard Hirsch	Vice President of the German Bundestag	Ulaanbaatar
September 1995	Punsalmaagiin Ochirbat	President of Mongolia	Berlin
February 1996	Chojisuren Purevdorj	Deputy Prime Minister	Berlin
September 1996	Klaus Kinkel	Federal Minister of Foreign Affairs	Ulaanbaatar
October 1996	Radnaasumberel Gonchigdorj	Mongolian Speaker of Parliament	Berlin
September 1997	Shukher Altangerel	Mongolian Foreign Minister	Berlin
2000	Natsagiin Bagabandi	Mongolian President	Berlin
2011	Angela Merkel	German Chancellor	Ulaanbaatar
2012	Tsakhiagiin Elbegdorj	Mongolian President	Berlin
2015	Tsakhiagiin Elbegdorj	Mongolian President	Berlin
2022	Luvsannamsrain Oyun-Erdene	Prime Minister of Mongolia	Berlin

== Cultural relations ==
From May to June 1995, the mixed German-Mongolian culture commission met in Ulaanbaatar under the direction of Peter Truhart. On September 16, 1997, an agreement on cultural exchange and cooperation was signed between Germany and Mongolia.

== Agreements ==
On August 22, 1994, Germany and Mongolia passed a double taxation agreement in order to avoid double taxation of German and Mongolian citizens. A year later, in October 1995, the two countries signed a financial cooperation agreement. A delegation from the Committee on Economic Cooperation and Development of the German Bundestag traveled to Mongolia in March 1998.

== Trade ==
Germany is Mongolia's main trading partner in the European Union, together with the United Kingdom, but on January 31, 2020, the United Kingdom left the EU.

In 2022, to reduce Germany's reliance on critical minerals from Russia and China, Chancellor Olaf Scholtz conveyed to visiting Prime Minister of Mongolia Luvsannamsrain Oyun-Erdene that Germany aims to buy raw materials from Mongolia, including copper and rare earths.

== Diaspora ==
In the 2010 Mongolian National Census, 3,852 Mongolian citizens were recorded to have been living in Germany.

== Resident diplomatic missions ==
- Germany has an embassy in Ulaanbaatar.
- Mongolia has an embassy in Berlin.

== See also ==
- Foreign relations of Germany
- Foreign relations of Mongolia
