= Bulgaria–Mongolia relations =

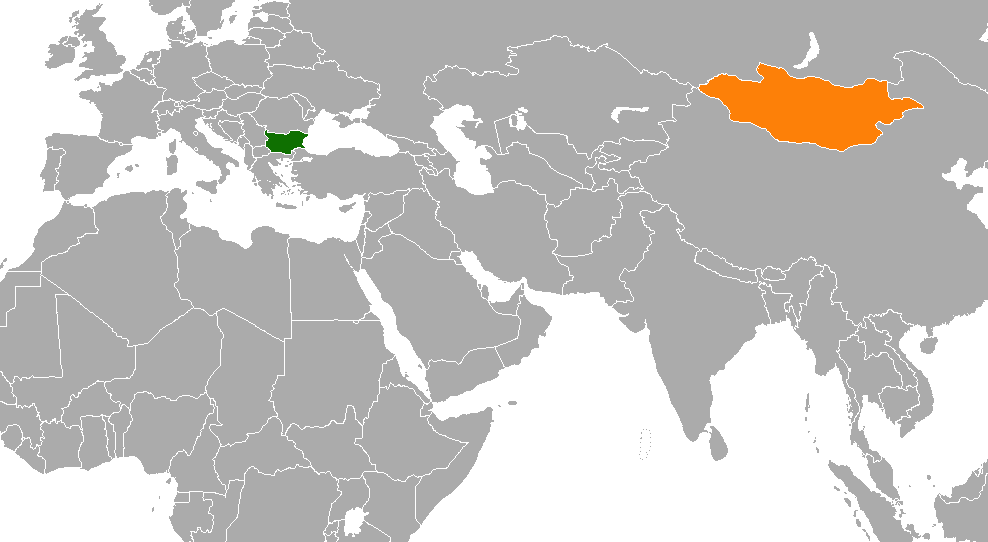

- Bulgaria: Mongolia

Bulgaria–Mongolia relations are the bilateral relations between Bulgaria and Mongolia. Bulgaria has an embassy in Ulaanbaatar and Mongolia has an embassy in Sofia.

== History ==
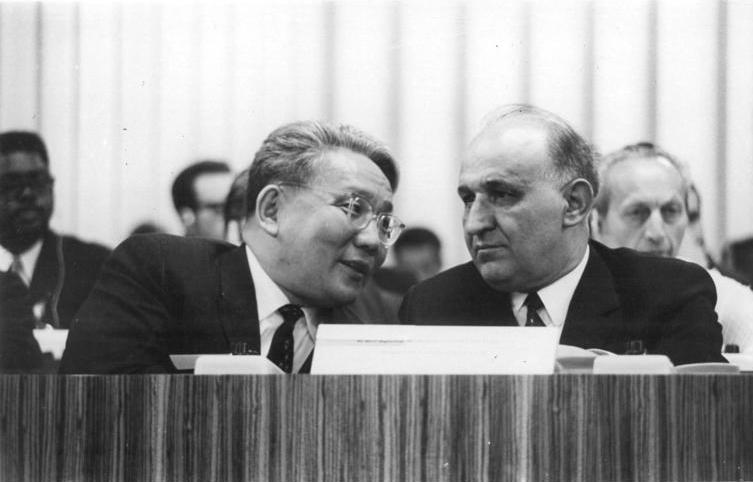
Yumjaagiin Tsedenbal speaking with Todor Zhivkov during a conference in East Berlin, June 1971.

The Mongol Empire invaded the Second Bulgarian Empire in 1242. This weakened the kingdom and it began losing territory to its neighbors. In modern times diplomatic relations between the two countries were first initiated on 22 April 1950. Due to the similar ideological situation in both countries, their relations witnessed a steady development up until the 1990s. Relations somewhat deteriorated for the next ten years, however, since 2001, they have been on a more positive track. Until the 1990s Bulgaria was Mongolia's third biggest trading partner, with agricultural products and light industry goods being the main exports. The volume of trade between Bulgaria and Mongolia totaled $2 million in 2008.

== High level visits ==
=== 1985–1989 ===
The General Secretary of the Bulgarian Communist Party and Chairman of the State Council of the People's Republic of Bulgaria Todor Zhivkov visited Mongolia in June 1985 at the invitation of the General Secretary of the Mongolian People's Revolutionary Party and Chairman of the Presidium of the State Great Khural Jambyn Batmönkh. Bulgarian parliamentary delegation headed by the Speaker of the National Assembly of the People's Republic of Bulgaria Stanko Todorov visited Mongolia in May 1987. The General Secretary of the Mongolian People's Revolutionary Party and Chairman of the Presidium of the State Great Khural Jambyn Batmönkh visited Bulgaria 1987 at the invitation of the Secretary General of the Central Committee of the Bulgarian Communist Party and Chairman of the State Council of the People's Republic of Bulgaria Todor Zhivkov. The Minister of Foreign Affairs of the People's Republic of Bulgaria Petar Mladenov visited Mongolia in July 1987. The Minister of agriculture and forestry of the People's Republic of Bulgaria Alexi Ivanov visited Mongolia in September 1988 for the 22nd meeting of the Intergovernmental Bulgarian-Mongolian Commission for Economic, Scientific and Technical Cooperation in Ulaanbaatar where he was received by the Prime Minister of Mongolia Dumaagiin Sodnom.

=== Since 1990 ===
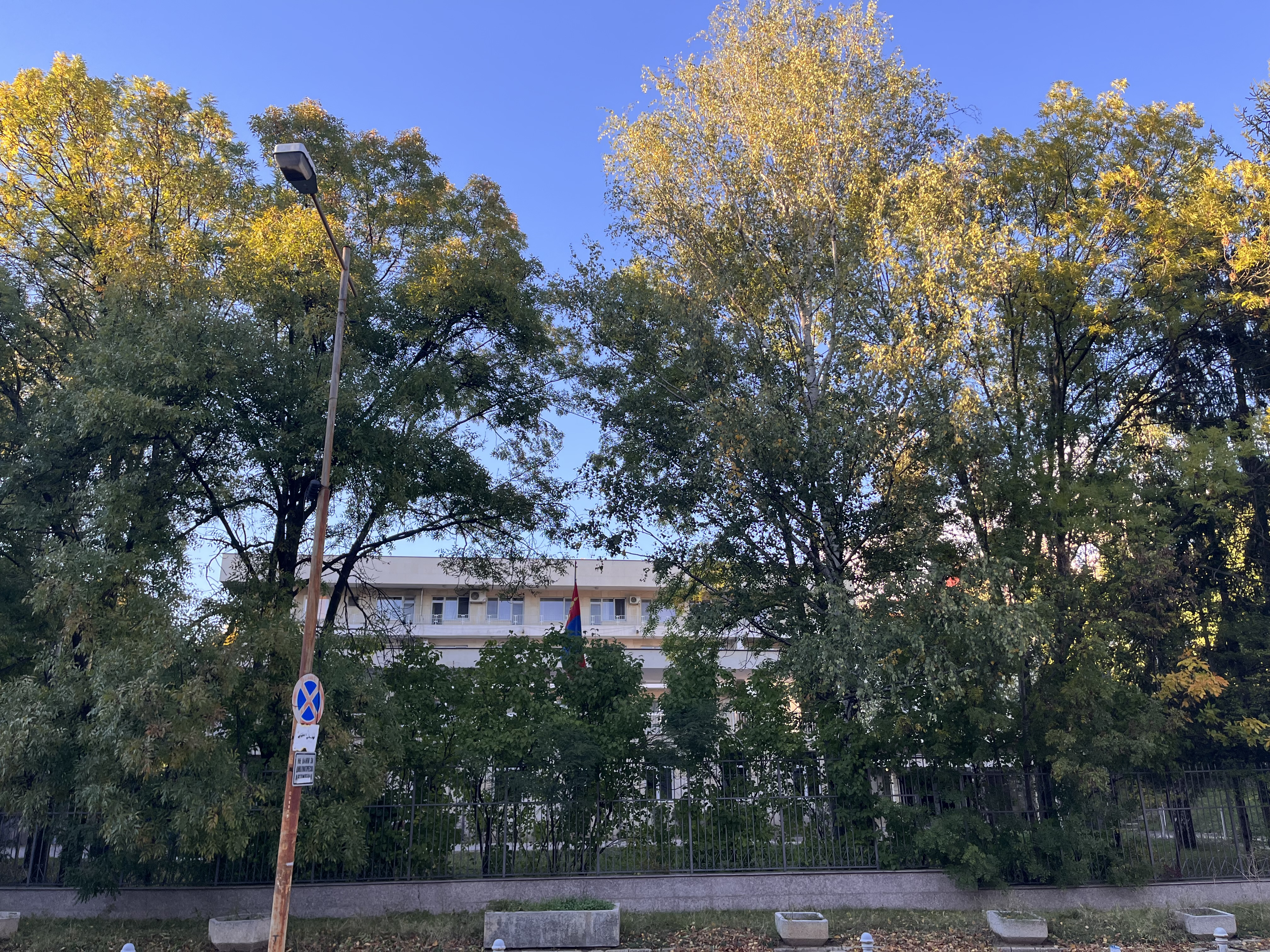
Embassy of Mongolia in Sofia

Bulgarian President Zhelyu Zhelev visited Mongolia in 1995 and Mongolian president Natsagiin Bagabandi visited Bulgaria in 2000. Bulgarian president Georgi Parvanov made an official visit to Ulaanbaatar in the summer of 2007. Rosen Plevneliev visited Mongolia in 2015.

== Trade ==
Until the beginning of the 1990s, Bulgaria was Mongolia's 3rd biggest trading partner. Agricultural products and light industry goods were the main exports. Due to the subsequent economical and political changes in both countries the volume of trade shrank considerably. The volume of trade between Bulgaria and Mongolia totaled $2 million for 2008, with the main exporter being Bulgaria.

== See also ==
- Foreign relations of Bulgaria
- Foreign relations of Mongolia
