= Kyrgyzstan–Mongolia relations =

- Mongolia: Kyrgyzstan

Diplomatic mission
- Kyrgyzstan Embassy in Ulaanbaatar: Mongolian Embassy in Bishkek

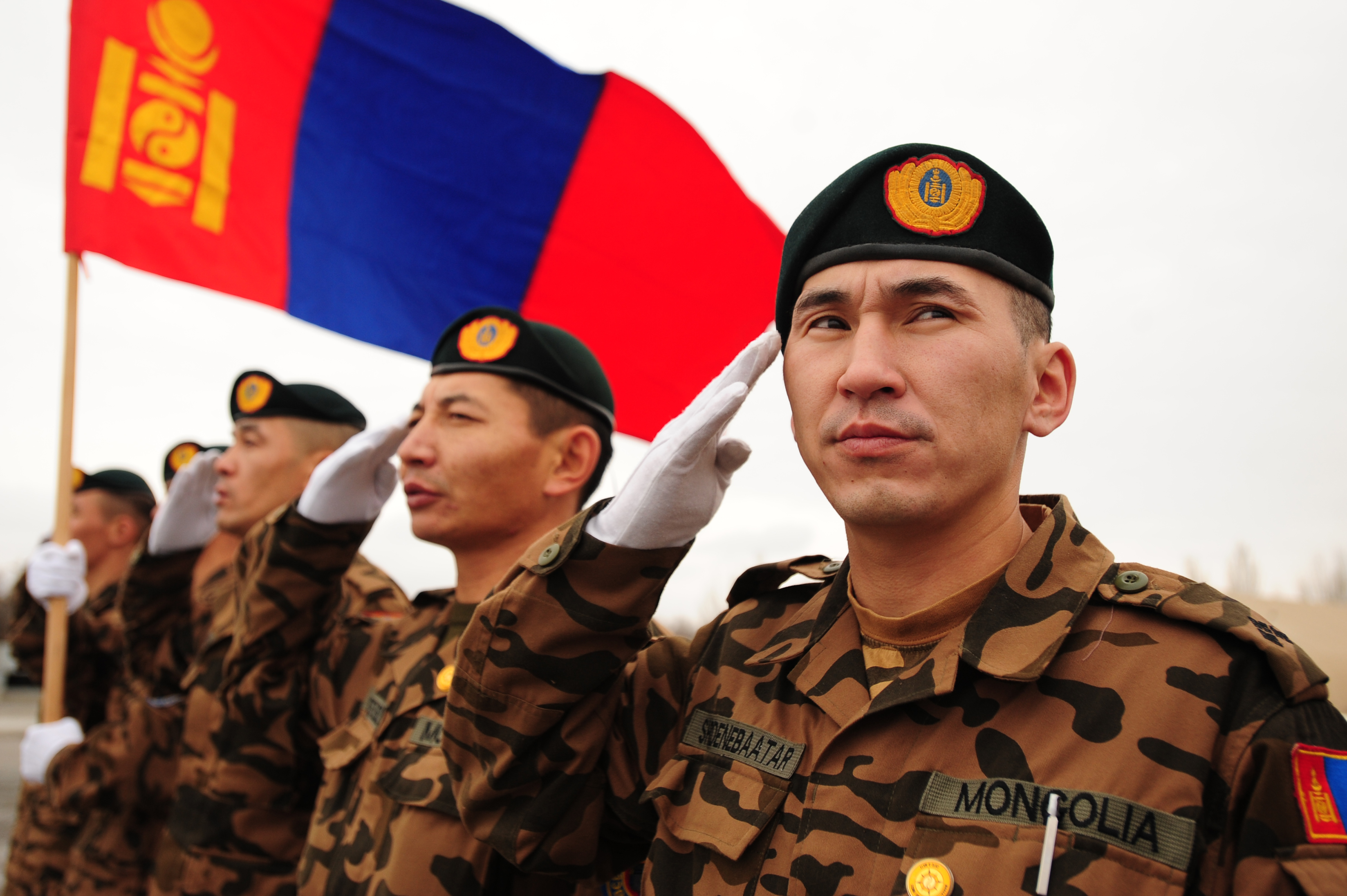
Mongolian soldiers salute while the Mongolian flag waves at the Transit Center at Manas, where they stayed for several days before moving forward to Afghanistan to support Operation Enduring Freedom.

Formal relations between Kyrgyzstan and Mongolia were established on 22 April 1992, a year after the independence of the Kyrgyz Republic in 1991.

== History ==
While formal state relations were established only in the 1990s, cultural and historic relations between the two countries go back centuries. The two share a common Turco-Mongol tradition, both share a common Ancient East Eurasian lineage, and both had been within the nucleus of the Mongol Empire. Furthermore, both of what are now Kyrgyzstan and Mongolia had been ruled by the Manchus and Tibetans, and both countries were formerly Eastern Bloc countries. Today they share similar experiences with relations with Russia and China. Citizens of both countries, holding diplomatic, official, and ordinary passports, enjoy visa-free travel. In addition, both the Kyrgyz and the Mongolian languages are officially written in the Cyrillic alphabet, using identical letters.

== High-level visits ==
In 1993, then-President Askar Akayev visited Mongolia for the first time. During the visit, two states signed several agreements including their first treaty of friendship and cooperation.

President Akayev visited Mongolia for the second time in 2002. In 2012 Mongolian President Tsakhiagiin Elbegdorj visited Kyrgyzstan. Mongolia opened its embassy in Kyrgyzstan in 2019 by upgrading the consulate itself established in 2014. Kyrgyzstan is represented in Mongolia via a non-resident ambassador in Beijing. Economic exchange between the two states remained limited with Kyrgyzstan export to Mongolia valued at $2.32 million while Mongolia exported goods to Kyrgyzstan valued only $413 thousand in 2019. On 10 June 2023 presidents of the two countries signed a Joint Declaration of Mongolia and the Kyrgyz Republic on Deepening Friendly Relations and Cooperation.

== Resident diplomatic missions ==
- Kyrgyzstan has an embassy in Ulaanbaatar.
- Mongolia has an embassy in Bishkek.

== See also ==
- Foreign relations of Kyrgyzstan
- Foreign relations of Mongolia
- Turco-Mongol tradition
