= Mongolia–Vietnam relations =

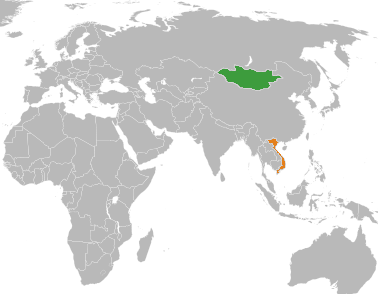

- Mongolia: Vietnam

Mongolia–Vietnam relations are bilateral relations between Mongolia and Vietnam. Vietnam has an embassy in Ulaanbaatar. Mongolia has an embassy in Hanoi.

== Treaties ==
The two countries established diplomatic ties on 17 November 1954. Although Mongolia did not directly participate in the Vietnam War, it nevertheless expressed ideological support for North Vietnam in the same manner it supported the Soviet Union in World War II and North Korea in the Korean War. Mongolia provided livestock as material assistance, including more than 100,000 head of horses, cows, and sheep. After the war, Mongolia received and brought up more than 400 war-orphaned children in 1960-1970s. North Vietnam leader Ho Chi Minh visited Mongolia and expressed his appreciation of Mongolia's support during wartime; Mongolian leader Yumjaagiin Tsedenbal paid a reciprocal visit to Hanoi later that year. At that time, the two countries signed the Agreement on Economic and Cultural Cooperation and in the following year began to conduct bilateral trade. The countries signed a Friendship and Cooperation Treaty in 1961, renewed it in 1979, and signed a new one in 1995. On 13 January 2003, the countries signed an 8-point cooperative document committing to cooperation between the two governments and their legislative bodies, replacing an earlier document signed in 1998.

There have been 13 sessions of the Vietnam-Mongolia inter-governmental committee on cooperation in trade, economics and sci-tech, with the next to be held in Ulaanbaatar in 2010. On 25 May 2004 in Ulaanbaatar, the countries signed agreements on railway transport and scientific and technological cooperation. Other agreements have covered areas such as plant protection and quarantine regulations, customs, health and education.

== High level visits ==
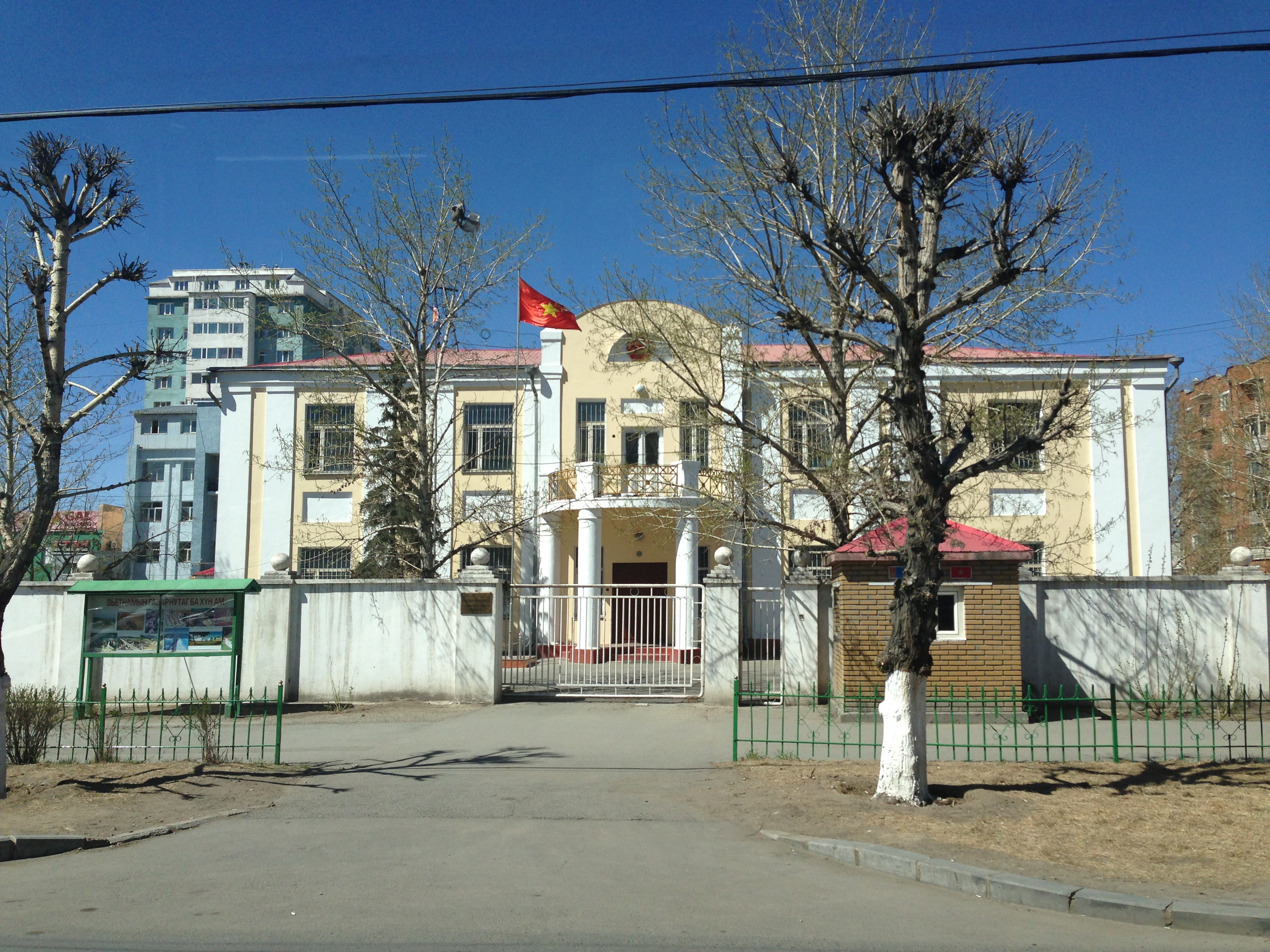
The Vietnamese embassy in Ulan Bator, Mongolia

Vietnamese Presidents Ho Chi Minh, Trần Đức Lương and Nguyen Minh Triet visited Mongolia in 1955, 2004 and 2008 respectively. Chairman of the Vietnamese Council of State Trường Chinh visited Mongolia in 1984. Mongolian Presidents Punsalmaagiin Ochirbat, Nambaryn Enkhbayar and Natsagiin Bagabandi visited Vietnam in 1994, 2002 and 2005 respectively.

== Trade ==
Vietnam's exports to Mongolia have risen from US$2.4m in 2005, to US$3.3m in 2006 and US$5.7m in 2007. They are aiming for US$10m of bilateral trade by 2010. During Nguyen Minh Triet's visit to Mongolia in October 2008, Vietnam agreed to sell 20,000 tonnes of rice to Mongolia.

== Other ties ==
The Christina Nobel Children Fund is a charity funding medical care for street children in the two countries.

== See also ==
- Foreign relations of Mongolia
- Foreign relations of Vietnam
- Mongol invasions of Vietnam
