= Mongolia–Singapore relations =

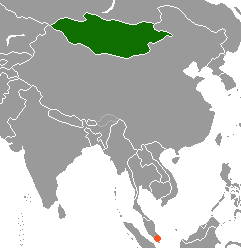

- Mongolia: Singapore

The earliest modern contact between Mongolia and the Republic of Singapore (Mongolian: Сингапур-Монголын харилцаа, Chinese: 新加坡—蒙古关系, Tamil: சிங்கப்பூர்-மங்கோலியா உறவுகள்) started in 1950, and both countries established diplomatic relations in 1970.

== History ==
There is a reference to "the craftsmen of the Lion City" ("Арслан хотын урчуудаараа хийлгэсэн юмаа хө""Arslan hotyn urchuudaaraa hiilgesen yumaa hu") in Aduuchin (Адуучин "Horseman"), a Mongolian folk song (origin unknown), but it is unclear if this refers to present-day Singapore, Cangzhou (which has a 5.4-meter high cast iron lion made in A.D. 953) or Shicheng ("Lion City", named for Wu Shi "Five Lions" Mountain. A major city during the Tang Dynasty, it was drowned in 1959).

The first dated interaction was in 1320, when envoys of the Yuan Dynasty (part of the Mongol Empire) were sent to obtain elephants from Long Ya Men (龍牙門, Dragon's Teeth Gate, the entrance to present-day Keppel Harbour in Singapore); the people of Long Ya Men subsequently visited the court of Yesün Temür in 1325 with a tribute and trade mission. Trade with Singapore (then known as Temasek/Singapura) continued during the 14th century, as evidenced by the Temasek Wreck, a Yuan-era shipwreck (dated to 1340-1352) found in Singapore waters, the largest Yuan blue-and-white porcelain documented shipwreck assemblage worldwide.

The earliest documented contact between modern Singapore and Mongolia started in 1950, when nine Mongolian pilgrims arrived at Singapore in a ship called the Automedon from Jeddah. In 1960s, the trade between Singapore and Mongolia was restricted due to the anti-communist policies of Singapore.

Singapore and Mongolia established diplomatic relations on June 11, 1970. Tsevengombyn Demiddagva, the Ambassador of Mongolia to India, was appointed as the first non-resident Ambassador of Mongolia to Singapore two years later. In 1990, B. Sharavsambuu, the Vice Chairman of the Councils of Minister of Mongolia, visited Singapore, marking the first official contact between the two countries. In 1992, Mongolia set up a trade representative office in Singapore; a consul, Haidav Gungaajav, was resident in Singapore at 100 St Patrick Rd during the mid- and late-1990s. A consulate-general was set up in Singapore ten years later, under Resolution No.92 of the Parliament of Mongolia in 2001, whereby the Trade Representative Office of Mongolia was reorganized as a Consulate General. In 2008, the consulate-general became an embassy and Gansukh Purevjav became the first resident ambassador of Mongolia to Singapore, Delgermaa Banzragch in 2012, and in 2015 T.Lkhagvadorj (who also served as Dean of the Diplomatic Corps in 2020). S.Enkhbayar served as Ambassador from December 2021 to April 2026. The current Ambassador of Mongolia to Singapore is Uyanga Ganbold.

In 1995, Puntsagiin Jasrai, the Prime Minister of Mongolia, visited Singapore, the first Prime Minister of Mongolia to do so. Further Prime Ministerial visits were by Nambaryn Enkhbayar in October 2002, then-Prime Minister Ts.Elbegdorj in 2005, S.Batbold in 2011 and Oyun-Erdene Luvsannamsrai in July 2022. In 2001, Natsagiin Bagabandi was the first President of Mongolia to visit Singapore. The President of Mongolia, Tsakhiagiin Elbegdorj, made a state visit to Singapore in November 2013.

Other high-level visits to Singapore include one by the Mongolian Minister for Foreign Affairs D. Tsogtbaatar (5-8 June 2019), and in January 2020, by the Speaker of the Parliament of Mongolia, G. Zandanshatar, who became Prime Minister of Mongolia in June 2025.

In December 1994, the Government of the Republic of Singapore accredited its Ambassador to the Republic of Korea as a non-Resident Ambassador to Mongolia. The Ambassador of the Republic of Singapore, Pang Eng Fong, presented his letter of credence to the Mongolian President in May 1995. BG Michael Teo Eng Cheng was appointed the non-resident Ambassador of Singapore to Mongolia from 1997 until 2001, followed by Calvin Eu Mun Hoo in July 2002, Chua Thai Keong from 2006 to 2010, Peter Tan Hai Chuan in June 2011; Yip Wei Kiat on 7 July 2015 and Eric Teo Boon Hee (from November 2019). The current non-resident Ambassador of Singapore to Mongolia is Wong Kai Jiun (from June 2025).

In 2016, Lee Hsien Loong, the Prime Minister of Singapore visited Mongolia, the first Prime Minister of Singapore to do so.

== Trade relations ==
According to the data from The Observatory of Economic Complexity, the exported values from Singapore to Mongolia were between 10 and 20 million US dollars. The exported value started increasing in 2003, reaching a peak of 70 million US dollars in 2013, before falling between 2009 and 2012. Singapore's main export product to Mongolia was motors. The proportion of food in exported products from Singapore to Mongolia started increasing in the early 2000s.

The exported values from Mongolia to Singapore were below 2 million US dollars between 1995 and 2003, in 2005, and between 2007 and 2012. In 2004, gold was exported to Singapore, making a high of the exported value, at 20 million US dollars. The exported value increased again in 2012 with a rise in the export proportion of transportation utilities and motors.

Singapore and Mongolia signed agreements among air services, promotion and reciprocal protection of investments and avoidance of double taxation in 1993, 1995 and 2002. Direct flights between Singapore and Ulaanbaatar (twice a week, with a stopover in Beijing) began in September 2014, but ended the following year. Nearly a decade later, regular non-stop flights between Singapore and Ulaanbaatar took place starting 4 November 2025, with twice-weekly flights on Tuesdays and Saturdays until 26 March 2026.

Mongolia provided 14-day visa-free access to Singapore passport holders, while Singapore provides 30-day visa-free access to Mongolian passport holders. During his visit to Mongolia in 2016, Lee Hsien Loong, the Prime Minister of Singapore, suggested the Mongolian government extend visa-free access to Mongolia for Singapore passport holders up to 30 days. This was granted effective June 2017.

To promote investment, the Embassy of Mongolia in Singapore also organises Business Forums: "Mongolia-Singapore Midas Touch Xchange Business Forum 2015" to celebrate the 45th anniversary of the establishment of diplomatic relations between Mongolia and Singapore and the 91st anniversary of the implementation of the first Mongolian constitution and the Declaration of Independence of Mongolia, and “Mongolia Investment Forum: Singapore 2024” (aimed at attracting investment to Mongolia's energy and financial sectors), which had over 140 participants, including representatives from banks, financial institutions, investment funds, and private investors from both Mongolia and Singapore.

Singapore and Mongolia signed their first Implementation Agreement on carbon credits collaboration on 6 October 2025, in which Singapore committed to channelling the value equivalent to 5% share of proceeds from authorised carbon credits towards climate adaptation measures in Mongolia. It was Singapore's 10th such implementation agreement.

== Cultural relations ==
Mongolian culture and arts have had a growing presence in Singapore since the 1990s, including singers and bands (Khar Sarnai being one of the earliest), visual artists (both group and solo exhibitions), and a contortion group. Singapore musicians and bands have performed at Mongolian jazz festivals and other music events such as Playtime.

The first Mongolian theatrical production in Singapore was The Mongol Khan (known in Mongolian as Tamgagui Tur Тамгагүй төр, "State Without A Seal"), making its Asian debut in October 2024 at the Marina Bay Sands Theatre after a successful 2023 season at London's West End. It ran for three weeks and attracted attention from production companies worldwide (including the USA, Japan, Australia and Gulf Countries), resulting in the signing of a memorandum for an international tour in 2025-2026.

In 2009, the Temasek Foundation of Singapore set aside 364,000 US dollars for cooperation with the Nanyang Polytechnic of Singapore and the National Productivity and Development Centre of Mongolia to provide training programmes for 90 Mongolian officials, specialists from the government, non-governmental institutions and private enterprises. Singapore also provided training programmes and study visits to Mongolian officials in public housing, Central Provident Fund system and technical and vocational education. As of 2022, 1600 Mongolian officials have participated in the Singapore Cooperation Programme in various fields such as English language, information technology, finance and management, urban and environmental management and tourism etc. Singapore and Mongolia signed a memorandum in energy cooperation in 2016.

To commemorate 50 years of diplomatic relations between Singapore and Mongolia, SingPost and Mongol Post launched a joint stamp issue in November 2020. Previous philatelic relations occurred in 1994, when Mongol Post issued stamps for the International Stamp Exhibition held in Singapore.

The Embassy of Mongolia in Singapore organised a 2-month Mongolian cultural exhibition, Chrysanthemum Charm, at Gardens by the Bay in September 2023. Besides 80 varieties of chrysanthemums and other flowers native to Mongolia, there were fully furnished life-sized Mongolian gers, models of native wildlife, and cultural performances by Mongolian artistes.

Around 270 Mongolians live in Singapore; 7,196 Mongolians visited Singapore in 2017-2018. Around 20 Singaporeans live in Mongolia; 4,804 Singaporeans visited Mongolia in 2017-2018. A Singaporean living in Mongolia established a non-governmental organization in order to improve Mongolians' lives.

== Resident diplomatic missions ==
- Mongolia has an embassy in Singapore.
- Singapore is accredited to Mongolia from its embassy in Seoul, South Korea.

== See also ==
- Foreign relations of Singapore
- Foreign relations of Mongolia
