= Egypt–Mongolia relations =

- Egypt: Mongolia

Egypt–Mongolia relations date back to the wars between Egypt and the Mongol Empire from 1260 to 1335 AD. Official relations between the modern states were established in 1964. Cairo currently hosts Mongolia's only embassy on the African continent. The countries have signed various agreements on bilateral cooperation.

== Historical relations ==
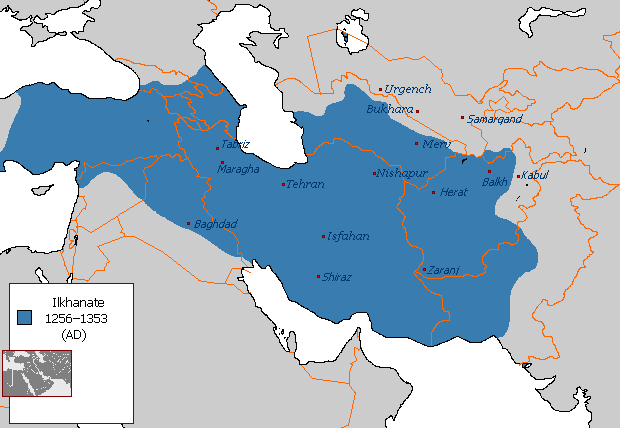
The Ilkhanate at its greatest extent c. AD 1330

The Silk Road connected the ancient civilizations of Egypt and China, passing through Mongolia. Silk may have been brought to Egypt through this route as early as 3,000 years ago.

The Mongol Empire, founded by Genghis Khan (c. 1162–1227 AD) had established unified political authority through the length of the Silk Road from Beijing to Baghdad by 1258. Following the capture of Baghdad by Hulagu Khan, the Mongols advanced into Syria and Palestine. With Hulagu's main forces occupied elsewhere, a relatively small Mongol-led army was defeated by an Egyptian Mamluk army in the Battle of Ain Jalut in 1260. The clash has been described as one of the most significant battles of world history, checking the further expansion of the Mongol Empire towards the southwest and profoundly influencing the future course of Arab and European history.

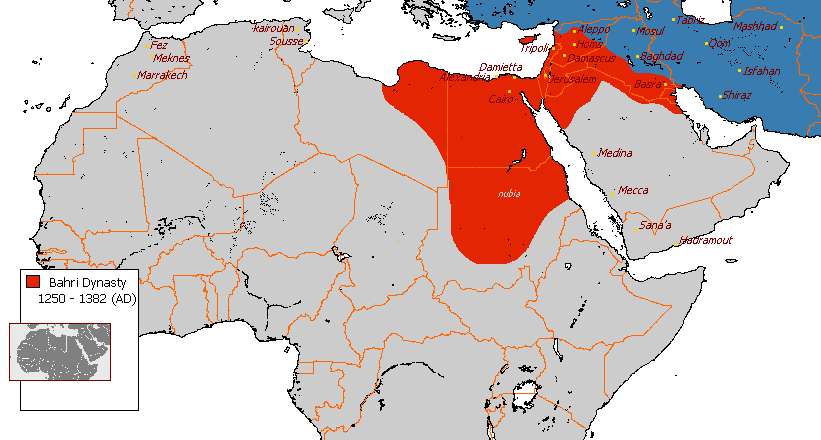
Bahri Mamluks empire at its greatest extent. Blue indicates the Ilkhanate.

Led by the victor of 'Ain Jalut, Sultan Baibars, the Egyptian forces conducted an aggressive policy towards the Mongols, advancing through the Armenian Kingdom of Cilicia to attack and defeat the Mongol-dominated Sultanate of Rûm in the Battle of Elbistan (1277 AD). Sporadic warfare continued. The Mamluks were victorious in the Second Battle of Hims (1281) against the armies of Abaqa Khan. The Mongols defeated the Mamluks in 1299 in the Battle of Wadi al-Khazandar, and the Mamluks regained the ascendancy at the Battle of Marj al-Saffar in 1303. It was not until 1323 that the two sides signed a peace treaty.

Following the collapse of the Mongol Ilkhanate in 1335, the Mamluks had little difficulty containing the forces of the successor Mongol state of the Jalayirids in Mesopotamia and the Anatolian Turkish beyliks in Asia Minor - although one of the smaller Beyliks, that of Osman I in the northwest of Asia Minor, later become the nucleus of the Ottoman Empire, which under Selim I was to conquer Egypt in the Battle of Ridaniya in 1517.

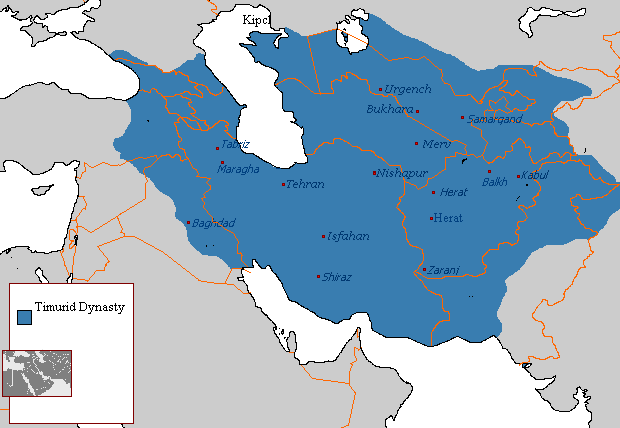
Timurid Empire c. 1402 AD

In 1401 a fresh Mongol threat appeared in the person of Timurlane, who invaded Syria (then part of the Mamluk Sultanate) with a huge army and sacked Aleppo and Damascus, slaughtering the inhabitants. The Mamluks fought back but were forced to retire to Egypt, and only avoided defeat when Timur moved east in preparation for an attack on China, dying in 1405 before he could return to complete his conquest of the Middle East. This was the last time Egypt was threatened by the Mongols.

After Egypt was absorbed by the Ottoman Empire in 1517, it did not regain full independence until the Egyptian Revolution of 1952, led by Gamal Abdel Nasser. It was during Nasser's presidency of Egypt that formal relations between the modern states of Egypt and Mongolia were established in 1964.

== Official visits and agreements ==
- In June 2001, a Mongolian parliamentary delegation visited Egypt, and met with the president of the National Assembly of Egypt. The group signed a cooperation agreement with Egypt, and agreed to increase the number of Mongolian students attending courses in Egypt.
- In December 2003, the Foreign Minister of Egypt met his Mongolian counterpart.
- Mongolian President Natsagiin Bagabandi paid an official visit to Egypt in April 2004 where he met with President of Egypt Hosni Mubarak. The two leaders discussed problems in Palestine and Iraq, and also discussed ways to enhance bilateral relations. Later in the visit, the two countries signed an executive protocol for cultural cooperation and agreements on air services, economic cooperation and investments protection.
- In 2005, Egyptian Foreign Minister Ahmed Aboul Gheit visited Mongolia, during which he began the planning of mutual visits of the ministers of finance of the two countries.
- In March 2007, the Egyptian Minister of International Cooperation visited Ulan Bator where he met Mongolian Prime Minister Miyeegombyn Enkhbold.
- In October 2008 the Secretary General of the Egyptian Fund for Technical Cooperation with the Commonwealth visited Ulaanbaatar where he met with ministers and discussed enhanced cooperation between Egypt and Mongolia. The Mongolian officials said they welcomed the technical support provided by the fund in training and other economic benefits.

== Security cooperation ==
In 2001, Mongolia sent policemen to Egypt to attend trainings sessions on anti-terrorism and the prevention of drug trafficking. In 2008, Mongolian officials visited Egypt to obtain information on the role of anti-corruption officials.

== Movement of people ==
There is a small number of Mongolian expatriates in Egypt, including ethnic Kazakh international students from Bayan-Ölgii Province, Uvs Province, and Nalaikh Düüreg of Ulaanbaatar who are studying theology at Al-Azhar University. During the 2011 Egyptian Revolution, the Mongolian government initially made plans to evacuate the forty-seven Mongolian nationals in the country to Kuwait, but in the end allocated MNT143.9 million to bring them back to Mongolia.

== Resident diplomatic missions ==
- Egypt is accredited to Mongolia from its embassy in Beijing, China.
- Mongolia has an embassy in Cairo.

== See also ==
- Foreign relations of Egypt
- Foreign relations of Mongolia
- Battle of Ain Jalut
