= France–Mongolia relations =

Diplomatic relations between the French Republic and Mongolia

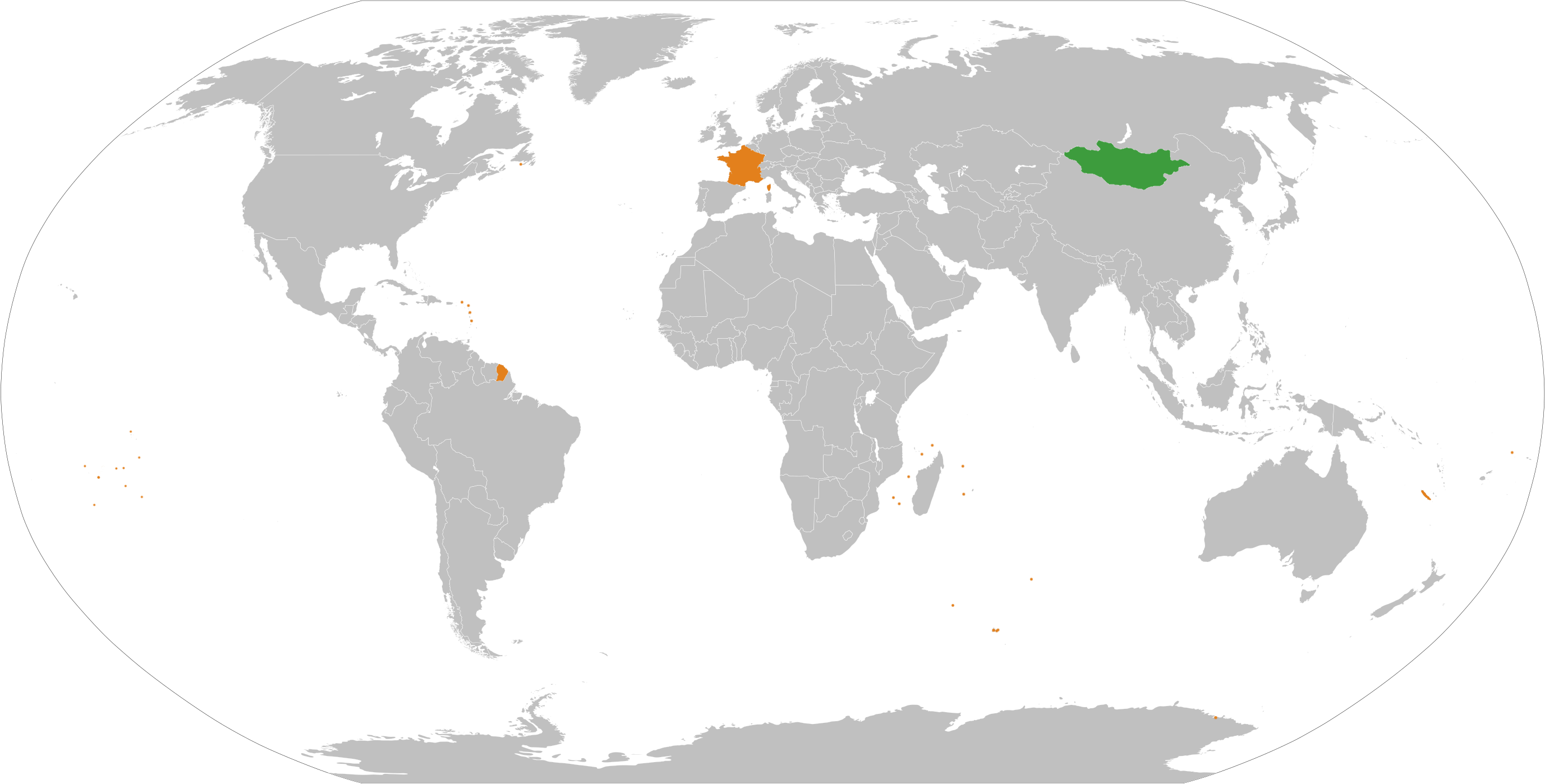

- France: Mongolia

Diplomatic mission
- Embassy of France, Ulaanbaatar: Embassy of Mongolia, Paris

Envoy
- Ambassador Ulambayaryn Nyamkhüü: Ambassador Sébastien Surun

France–Mongolia relations are the bilateral relations of France and Mongolia.

While contacts were established between French and Mongol rulers in the 13th century, relations between the modern nations only became official on 27 April 1965, only gaining momentum in the 1990s as a result of Mongolia's democratic revolution.

Franco-Mongol relations are part of a more general framework of partnership with the European Union, which is now Mongolia's third largest trade partnership. A European Union-Mongolia Partnership and Cooperation Agreement was launched in 2017.

Significant high-level visits include Mongolian President Punsalmaagiin Ochirbat's visit to France in 1996 and French President Emmanuel Macron's visit in 2023. During the visit of President of Mongolia Ukhnaagiin Khurelsukh in October 2023, the two countries agreed to develop uranium mining in southern Mongolia. French Orano plans to invest $1.7 billion dollars in Mongolia.

There is a French embassy in Ulaanbaatar, and a Mongolian embassy in Paris.

== See also ==
- Foreign relations of France
- Foreign relations of Mongolia
