= Mexico–Mongolia relations =

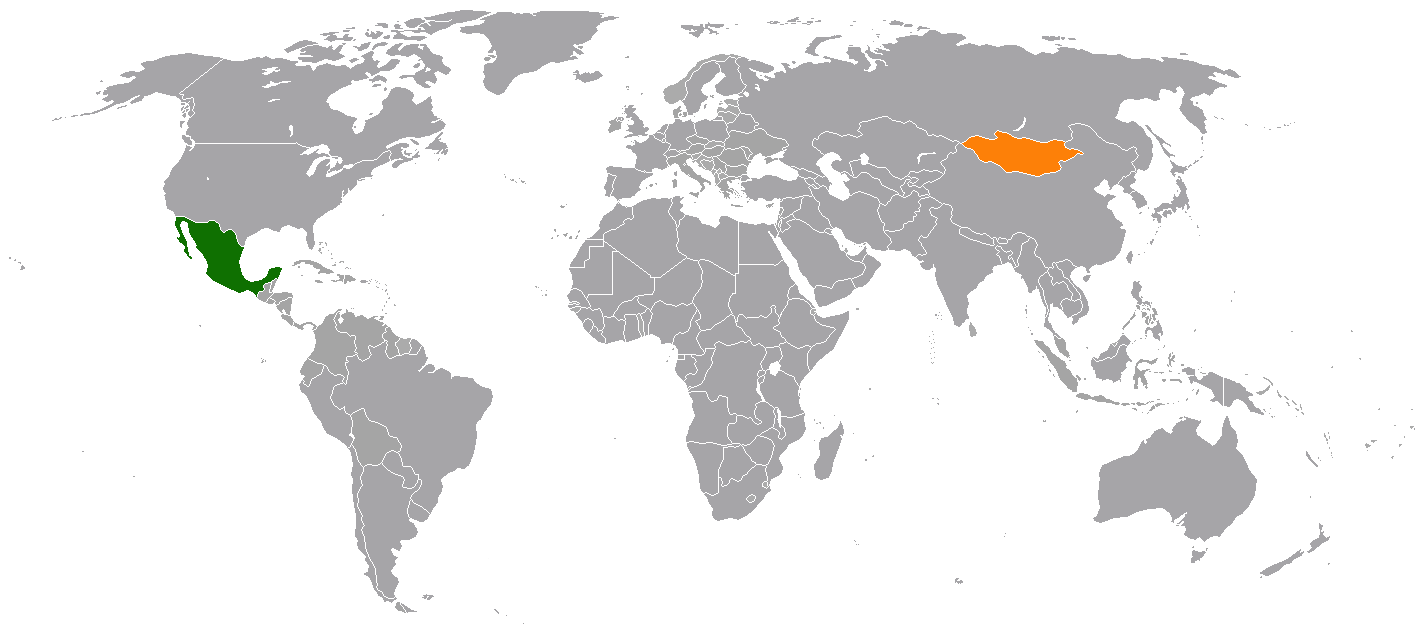

- Mexico: Mongolia

The nations of Mexico and Mongolia established diplomatic relations in 1975. Both nations are members of the Forum of East Asia–Latin America Cooperation and the United Nations.

== History ==
On 24 September 1975, Mexico and Mongolia established diplomatic relations. Initially, relations between both nations were conducted via multilateral forums such as at the United Nations. In October 2001, Mexican President Vicente Fox paid an official visit to Mongolia and met Mongolian President Natsagiin Bagabandi. During the visit, both nations signed two bilateral agreements and discussed an expansion of bilateral cooperation.

In May 2007, Mongolian Foreign Viceminister Bekhbat Khasbazaryn paid a visit to Mexico where he mentioned Mongolia's interest in Mexican investors taking advantage of the opportunities offered by Mongolia. He also stressed the need to explore new schemes aimed at strengthening bilateral cooperation in the trade and investment sectors, especially mining. In September 2016, Mongolian President Tsakhiagiin Elbegdorj arrived in Mexico on a private visit where he toured the cultural ruins of Teotihuacan and met with the President of the Mexico-Mongolia Friendship Council.

In January 2011, a delegation from Mexico, led by Senator Carlos Jiménez Macías assisted the Asia Pacific Parliamentary Forum being held in Ulaanbaatar. During the visit, the Mexican delegation met with Chairman of the State Great Khural, Damdiny Demberel where they discussed several bilateral topics. In 2015, both nations celebrated 40 years of diplomatic relations.

In April 2023, both nations held their first meeting of bilateral political consultation.

== High-level visits ==
High-level visits from Mexico to Mongolia

- President Vicente Fox (2001)
- Senator Carlos Jiménez Macías (2011)

High-level visits from Mongolia to Mexico

- President of the Parliament Lkhamsuren Enebish (2001)
- Foreign Viceminister Bekhbat Khasbazaryn (2007)
- President Tsakhiagiin Elbegdorj (2016)

== Bilateral agreements ==
Both nations have signed a few bilateral agreements such as an Agreement on Cultural Exchanges (1985); Memorandum of Understanding for the Establishment of a Mechanism for Policy Consultations between both nations (2001) and an Agreement for the Suppression of Visas in Diplomatic and Official Passports (2001).

== Trade ==
In 2023, trade between Mexico and Mongolia totaled US$1.5 million. Mexico's main exports to Mongolia include: chocolate, pastries, refrigerators, data processing machines, and medicines. Mongolia's main exports to Mexico include: clothing (pullovers/sweaters), electrical resistors, axel and cranks, and instruments and appliances for machines.

== Diplomatic missions ==
Neither country has a resident ambassador.

- Mexico is accredited to Mongolia from its embassy in Seoul, South Korea and maintains an honorary consulate in Ulaanbaatar.
- Mongolia is accredited to Mexico from its embassy in Washington, D.C., United States.
