= Mongolia–Montenegro relations =

- Mongolia: Montenegro

Mongolia–Montenegro relations refers to the bilateral relations between Mongolia and Montenegro. Relations between the two countries date back to 1956, when Montenegro was part of Yugoslavia. Following Montenegro's independence in 2006, formal relations were established between the two countries.

== History ==
=== Yugoslavia ===
Between 1918 and 2006, Montenegro was part of Yugoslavia, later Serbia and Montenegro. During this time, Yugoslavia had relations with Mongolia. Bilateral relations were established on 20 November 1956. In 1963, amid the Sino-Soviet split, Mongolia took the side of the Soviet Union, which also had the effect of bringing Yugoslavia closer to Mongolia.

In 1968, Josip Broz Tito visited Mongolia on a world tour, which also saw him visit countries such as Japan, Iran, and Ethiopia. While in Mongolia, Tito was granted an honorary doctorate from the country. According to Svetozar Rajak, "in a way… the first white European who did not come to subjugate and arrived instead as an equal, professing independence and mutual respect." During the meeting, Tito and his wife visited a traditional yurt, where their Mongolian hosts insisted on dressing them in traditional Mongolian clothing.

Several agreements were signed between Mongolia and Yugoslavia, including the Agreement on Cultural and Scientific Cooperation and an economic agreement, both signed on 21 June 1985, the Program of Cultural Cooperation, signed on 15 October 1989, and a payment agreement signed on 15 November 1990.

=== Independence ===
In 2006, following Montenegrin independence, Mongolia recognized Montenegro.

In September 2023, the Montenegrin Olympic Committee was the first Montenegrin institution to establish direct relations with a partner institution in Mongolia. This followed the signing of a memorandum of understanding

On 8 September 2026, Jakov Milatović visited Mongolia with his wife. During the trip, he met with Ukhnaagiin Khürelsükh to discuss relations between the two countries, including cooperation in the areas of trade, economy, investment, culture, education, and science. They also signed a joint declaration aimed at strengthening cultural and economic ties. Also while in Mongolia, Milatović visited the Chinggis Khaan National Museum. During the trip, seven agreements were signed between the two countries.

That same day, Dušan Simonović, head of the Montenegrin Olympic Committee and Honorary Consul of Mongolia since 2023, was granted the Medal of Friendship by the Mongolian government.

Following the meeting, Ukhnaagiin and Milatović discussed potential economic ties between the two countries, including Montenegro's role as an entry to the European market. Tourism, investments, and real estate were also mentioned as economic sectors of focus, as well as mining, energy and renewable energy sources, agriculture and the food industry.

On 23 September 2026, Ukhnaagiin again met with Milatović during the 80th session of the UN General Assembly to celebrate 20 years of relations, as well as to discuss the future of Mongolia–Montenegro relations. During the meeting, they discussed potential ways the two countries could expand their relations, particularly in fields such as politics, economy, tourism, education, and culture. They also discussed working together on international issues, such as climate change and combating desertification.

== Initiatives ==
The Mongolian and Montenegrin governments have agreed to work together on a wide variety of fields, including trade, economy, investment, culture, education, science, politics, and tourism. Climate change has seen a particular focus, due to Montenegro's status as the world's first ecological state, as well as Mongolia's significant efforts to fight climate change, such as the Million Tree Initiative.
