= Battsetseg Batmunkh =

Mongolian politician

- Батмөнхийн Батцэцэг
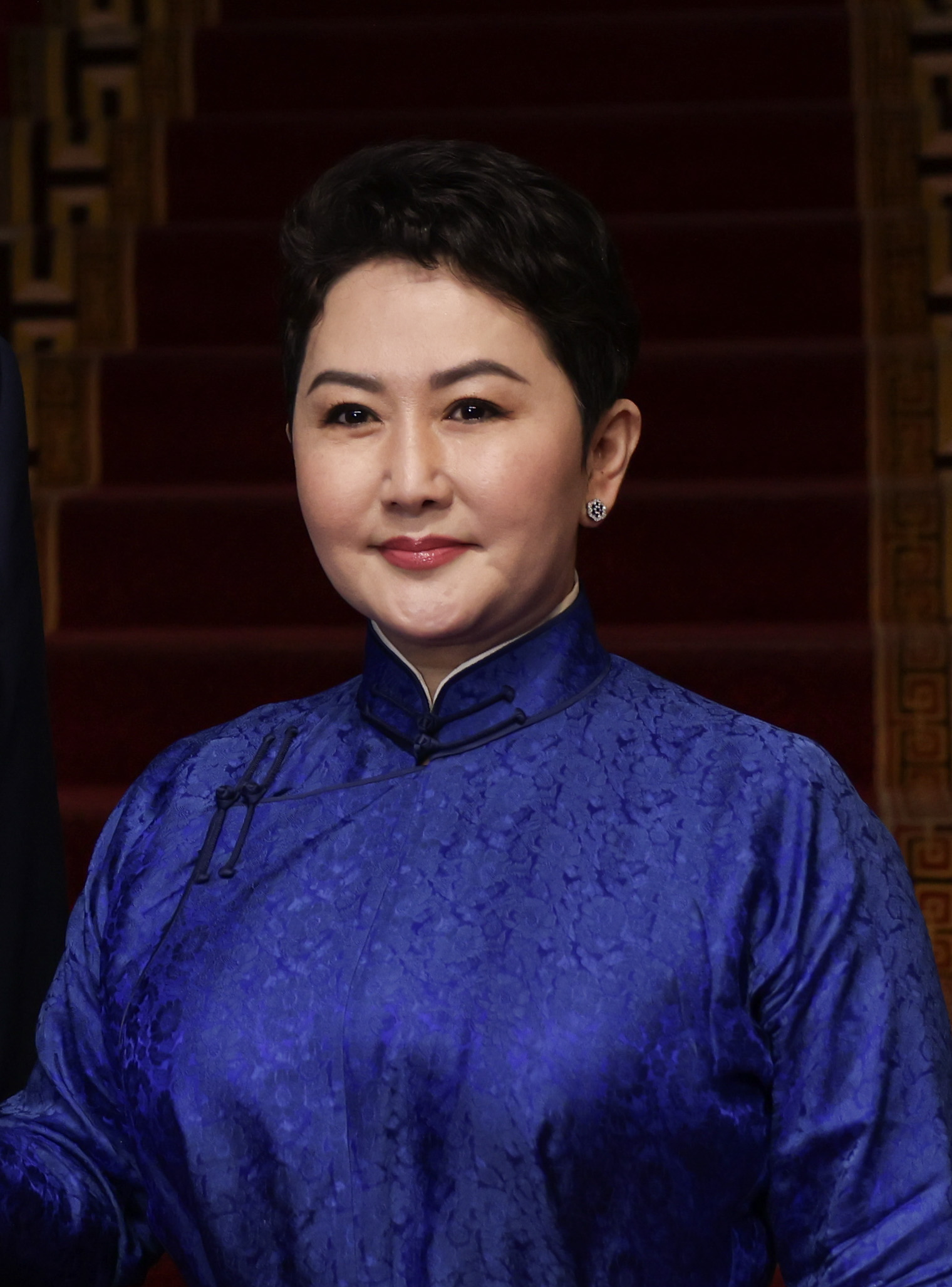
- Battsetseg Batmunkh in 2024

Minister of Foreign Affairs
- Incumbent
- Assumed office 29 January 2021
- President: Ukhnaagiin Khürelsükh
- Preceded by: Nyamtseren Enkhtaivan

Deputy Minister for Foreign Affairs of Mongolia
- In office 2016–2020

Personal details
- Born: 9 December 1973 (age 52) Bayankhongor, Mongolia
- Party: Mongolian People’s Party
- Education: National University of Mongolia; Institute of Finance and Economics; Maastricht School of Management

Battsetseg Batmunkh (born 9 December 1973) is the Minister of Foreign Affairs of Mongolia since 2021. She holds a Bachelor of Arts in International Relations from the National University of Mongolia in 1996, a Bachelor of Business Administration from the University of Finance and Economics of Mongolia in 2000 and a Master of Business Administration from Maastricht School of Management in 2005. Previously she has served in various executive positions at Munkhiin Useg Group, and as Deputy Minister for Foreign Affairs.

== Biography ==
She was born in Bayankhongor on 9 December 1973. In 1992 she graduated from school No. 13 in the city of Darkhan.

She graduated in 1996 with a bachelor's degree from the Institute of International Relations at the National University of Mongolia. In 2000, she earned a Bachelor of Business Administration from the Institute of Finance and Economics of Mongolia, followed by a Master of Business Administration from the Maastricht School of Management in the Netherlands in 2005. From 2007 to 2015, she was the Chairman of the Board of Directors of Munkhiin Useg Group LLC. Her political career includes serving as advisor to the Secretary General of the Mongolian People's Party from 2010 to 2011, and as Head of the Department of External Relations and Cooperation of the MPP from 2011 to 2012. She was advisor to the Minister of Finance on foreign policy between 2015 and 2016, and later served as Vice Minister of Foreign Affairs from 2016 to 2020 before assuming her current ministerial role.

== Personal life ==
She speaks Mongolian, English and Russian. She is married and has three children.
