= List of diplomatic missions of Mongolia =

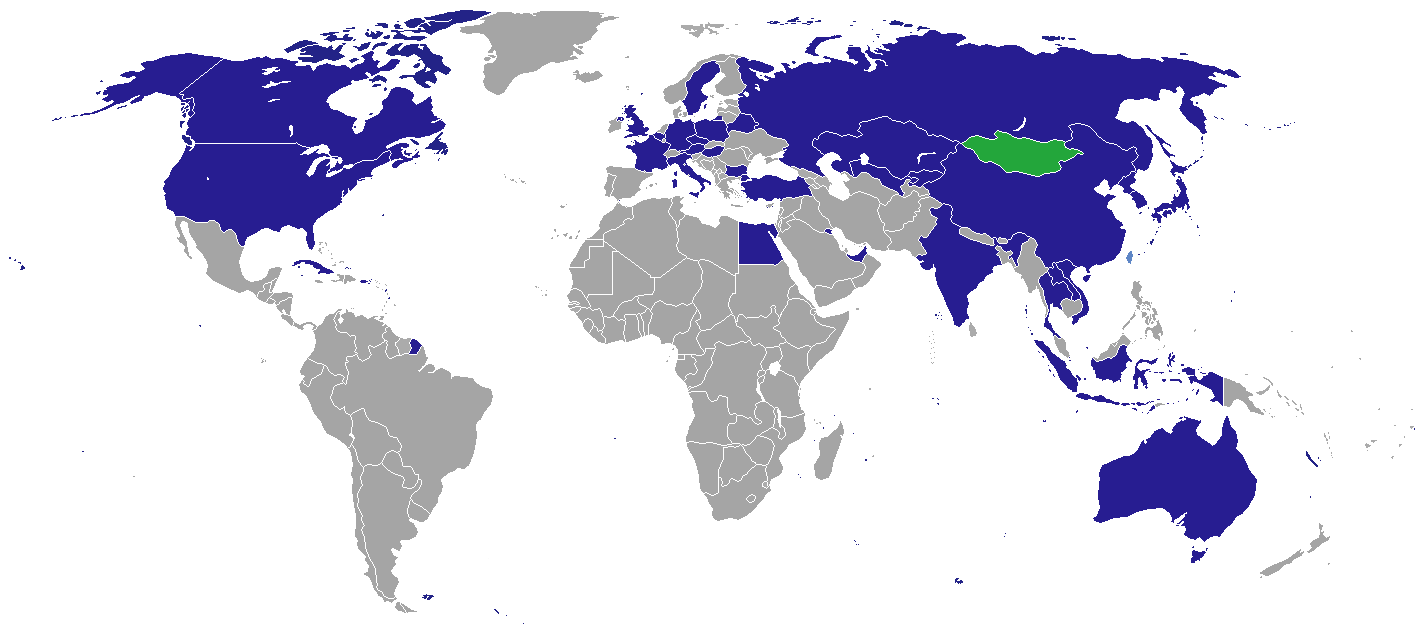
Countries hosting diplomatic missions of Mongolia

This is a list of diplomatic missions of Mongolia. Mongolia's foreign policy was traditionally aligned with the Soviet bloc, giving due deference to its other significant neighbour, the People's Republic of China. It now has warmer ties with the West (it opened its Washington, D.C. mission in 1989), but Mongolia's comparatively small stature and isolation means it still has a modest network of diplomatic missions.

== Current missions ==
=== Africa ===
Host country	Host city	Mission	Concurrent accreditation	Ref.
Egypt	Cairo	Embassy	Countries: Jordan; Lebanon; Mozambique; South Africa	

=== Americas ===
Host country	Host city	Mission	Concurrent accreditation	Ref.
Canada	Ottawa	Embassy		
Cuba	Havana	Embassy	Countries: Argentina; Brazil; Chile; Colombia; Ecuador; Peru	
United States	Washington, D.C.	Embassy	Countries: Mexico	
United States	Chicago	Consulate-General	Countries: Mexico	
United States	San Francisco	Consulate-General	Countries: Mexico	

=== Asia ===
Host country	Host city	Mission	Concurrent accreditation	Ref.
China	Beijing	Embassy	Countries: Pakistan	
China	Hohhot	Consulate-General	Countries: Pakistan	
China	Hong Kong	Consulate-General	Countries: Pakistan	
China	Shanghai	Consulate-General	Countries: Pakistan	
China	Erenhot	Consulate	Countries: Pakistan	
China	Manzhouli	Consulate	Countries: Pakistan	
India	New Delhi	Embassy	Countries: Bangladesh; Bhutan; Nepal; Sri Lanka	
Indonesia	Jakarta	Embassy	Countries: Philippines; Timor-Leste; International Organizations: Association of Southeast Asian Nations	
Japan	Tokyo	Embassy		
Japan	Osaka	Consulate-General		
Kazakhstan	Astana	Embassy	Countries: Georgia; Tajikistan; Turkmenistan	
Kazakhstan	Almaty	Consulate	Countries: Georgia; Tajikistan; Turkmenistan	
Kuwait	Kuwait City	Embassy	Countries: Oman; Qatar	
Kyrgyzstan	Bishkek	Embassy		
Laos	Vientiane	Embassy	Countries: Cambodia	
North Korea	Pyongyang	Embassy		
Singapore	Singapore	Embassy	Countries: Brunei; Malaysia	
South Korea	Seoul	Embassy		
South Korea	Busan	Consulate		
Taiwan	Taipei	Trade & Economic Representative Office		
Thailand	Bangkok	Embassy	Countries: Myanmar	
Turkey	Ankara	Embassy	Countries: Azerbaijan; Israel	
Turkey	Istanbul	Consulate-General	Countries: Azerbaijan; Israel	
United Arab Emirates	Abu Dhabi	Embassy	Countries: Bahrain; Saudi Arabia	
Uzbekistan	Tashkent	Embassy		
Vietnam	Hanoi	Embassy		

=== Europe ===
Host country	Host city	Mission	Concurrent accreditation	Ref.
Austria	Vienna	Embassy	Countries: Croatia; Montenegro; Slovenia	
Belarus	Minsk	Embassy		
Belgium	Brussels	Embassy	Countries: Luxembourg; Netherlands; International Organizations: European Union	
Bulgaria	Sofia	Embassy	Countries: Cyprus; Greece; Moldova; North Macedonia; Romania	
Czech Republic	Prague	Embassy	Countries: Slovakia	
France	Paris	Embassy	Countries: Monaco; Portugal; Spain	
Germany	Berlin	Embassy		
Hungary	Budapest	Embassy	Countries: Serbia	
Italy	Rome	Embassy		
Poland	Warsaw	Embassy	Countries: Latvia; Lithuania; Ukraine	
Russia	Moscow	Embassy	Countries: Armenia; Iran	
Russia	Irkutsk	Consulate-General	Countries: Armenia; Iran	
Russia	Kyzyl	Consulate-General	Countries: Armenia; Iran	
Russia	Ulan-Ude	Consulate-General	Countries: Armenia; Iran	
Sweden	Stockholm	Embassy	Countries: Denmark; Estonia; Finland; Iceland; Norway	
United Kingdom	London	Embassy	Countries: Ireland	

=== Oceania ===
Host country	Host city	Mission	Concurrent accreditation	Ref.
Australia	Canberra	Embassy	Countries: New Zealand	

=== Multilateral organisations ===
Organization	Host city	Host country	Mission	Concurrent accreditation	Ref.
United Nations	New York City	United States	Permanent Mission	Countries: Guatemala	
United Nations	Geneva	Switzerland	Permanent Mission	Countries: Holy See; Switzerland	

== Gallery ==
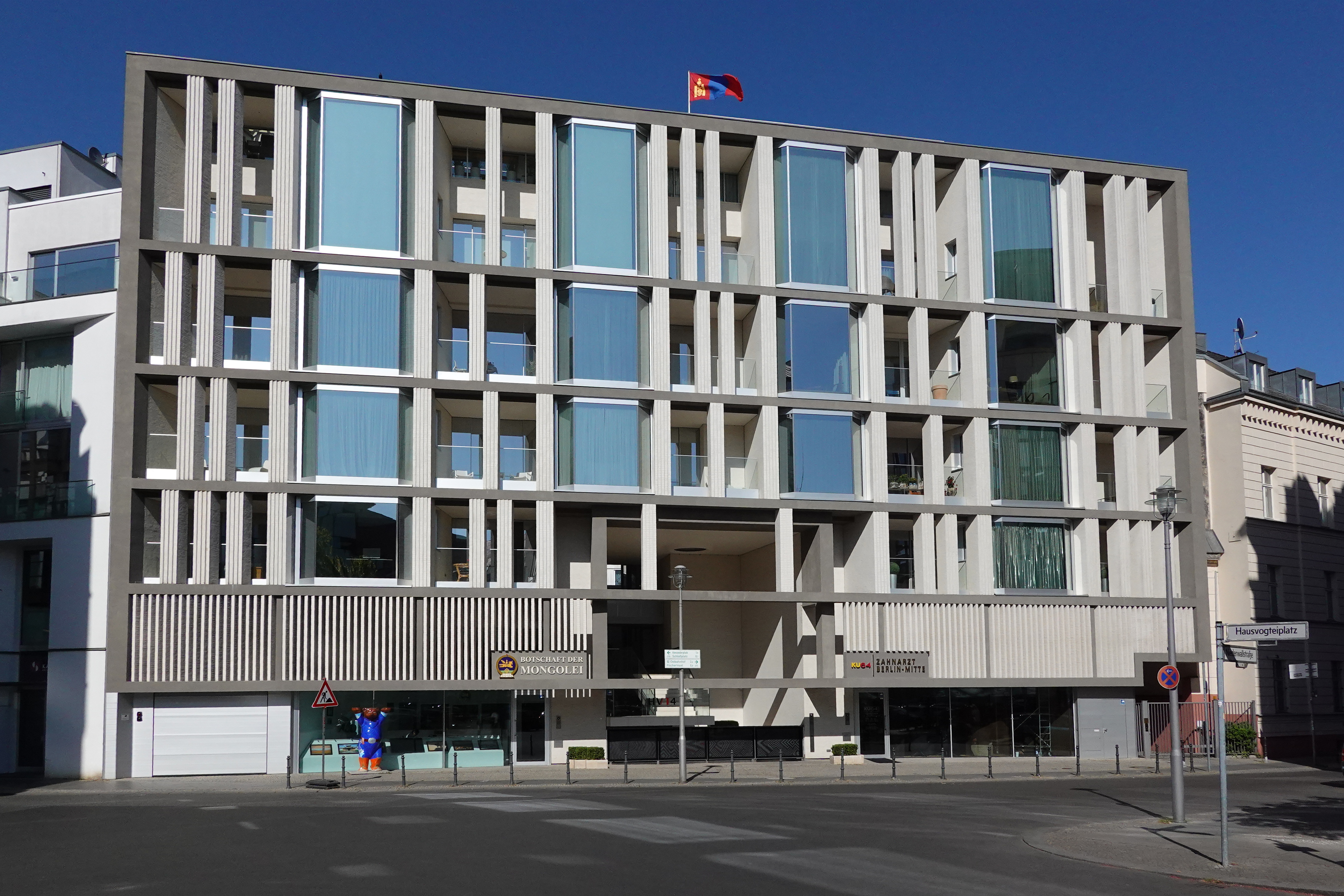
Building hosting the Embassy in Berlin

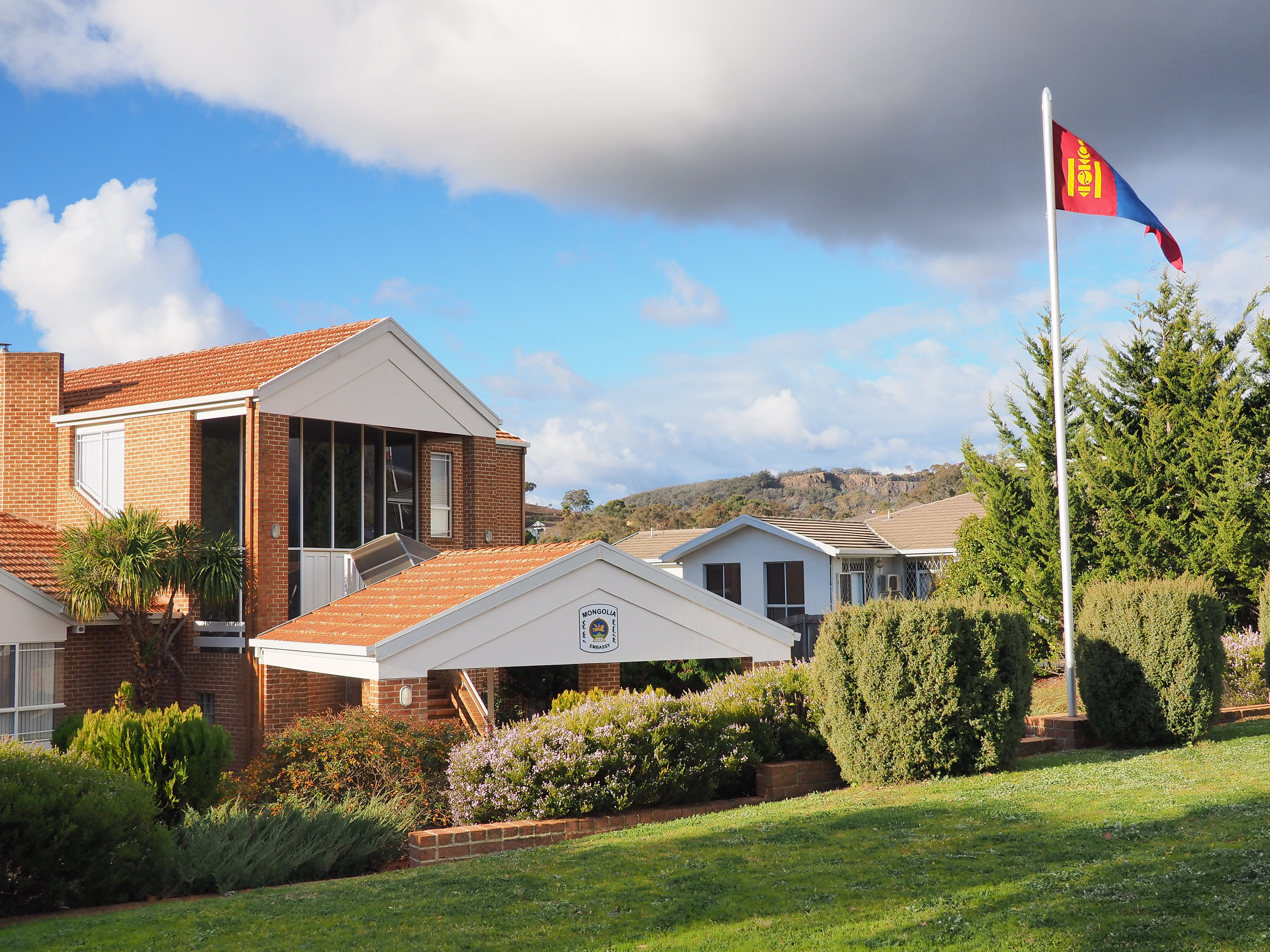
Embassy in Canberra

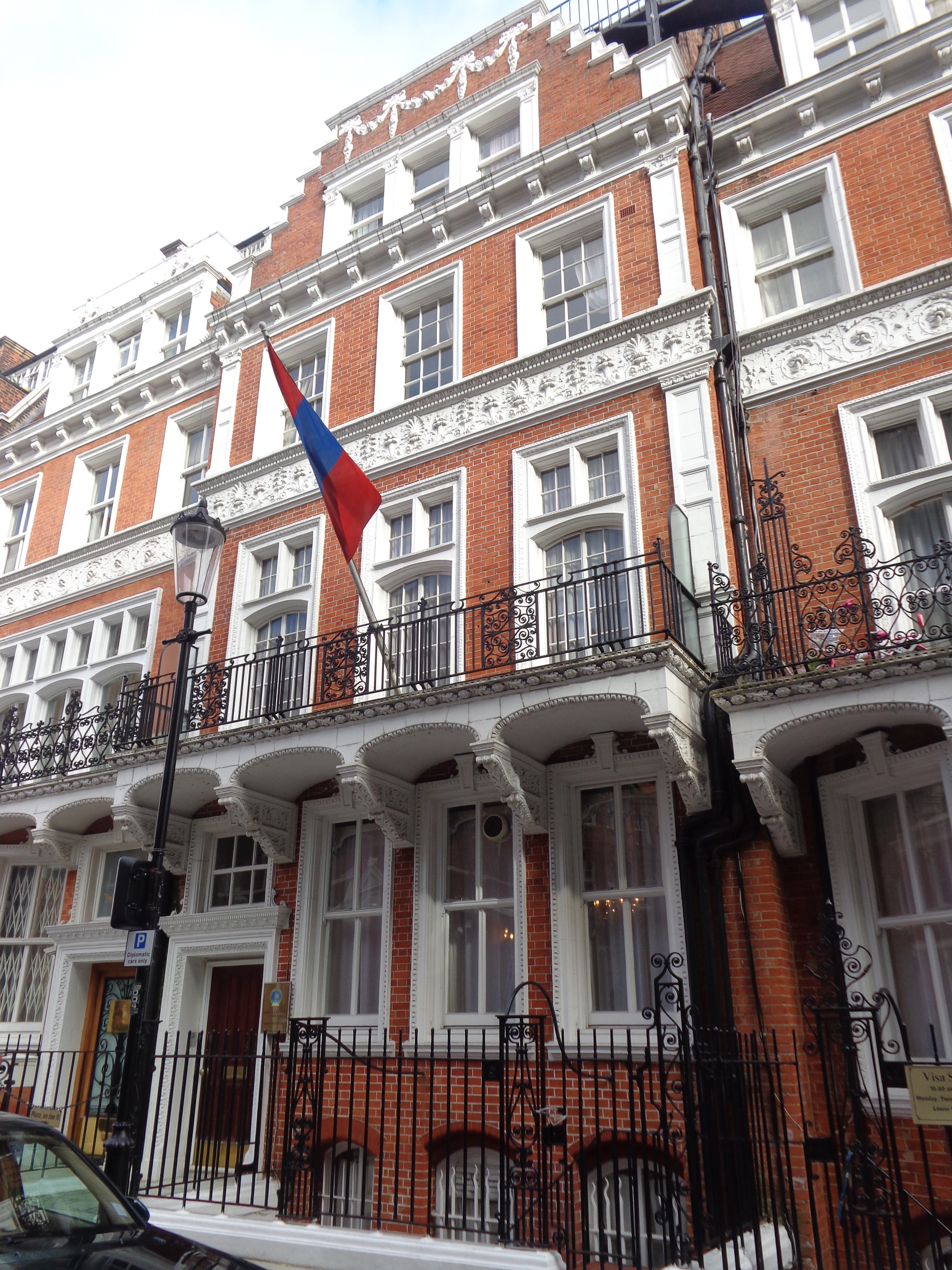
Embassy in London

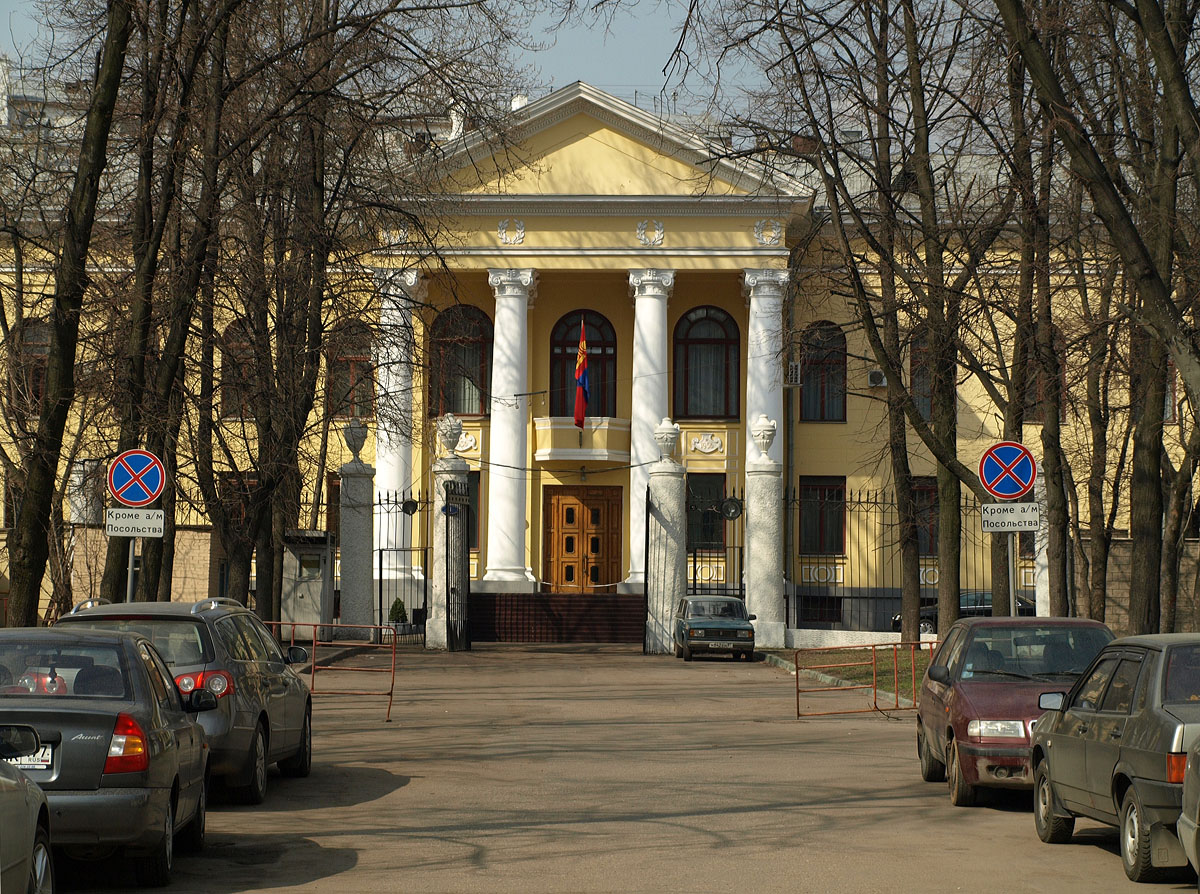
Embassy in Moscow

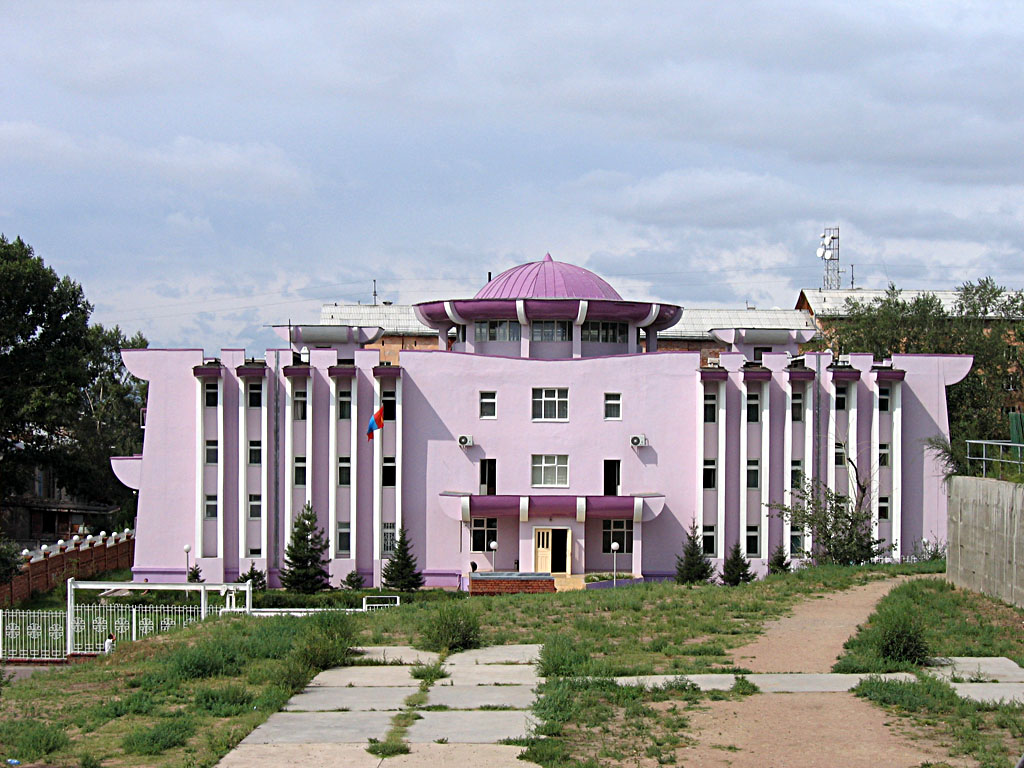
Consulate-General in Ulan-Ude

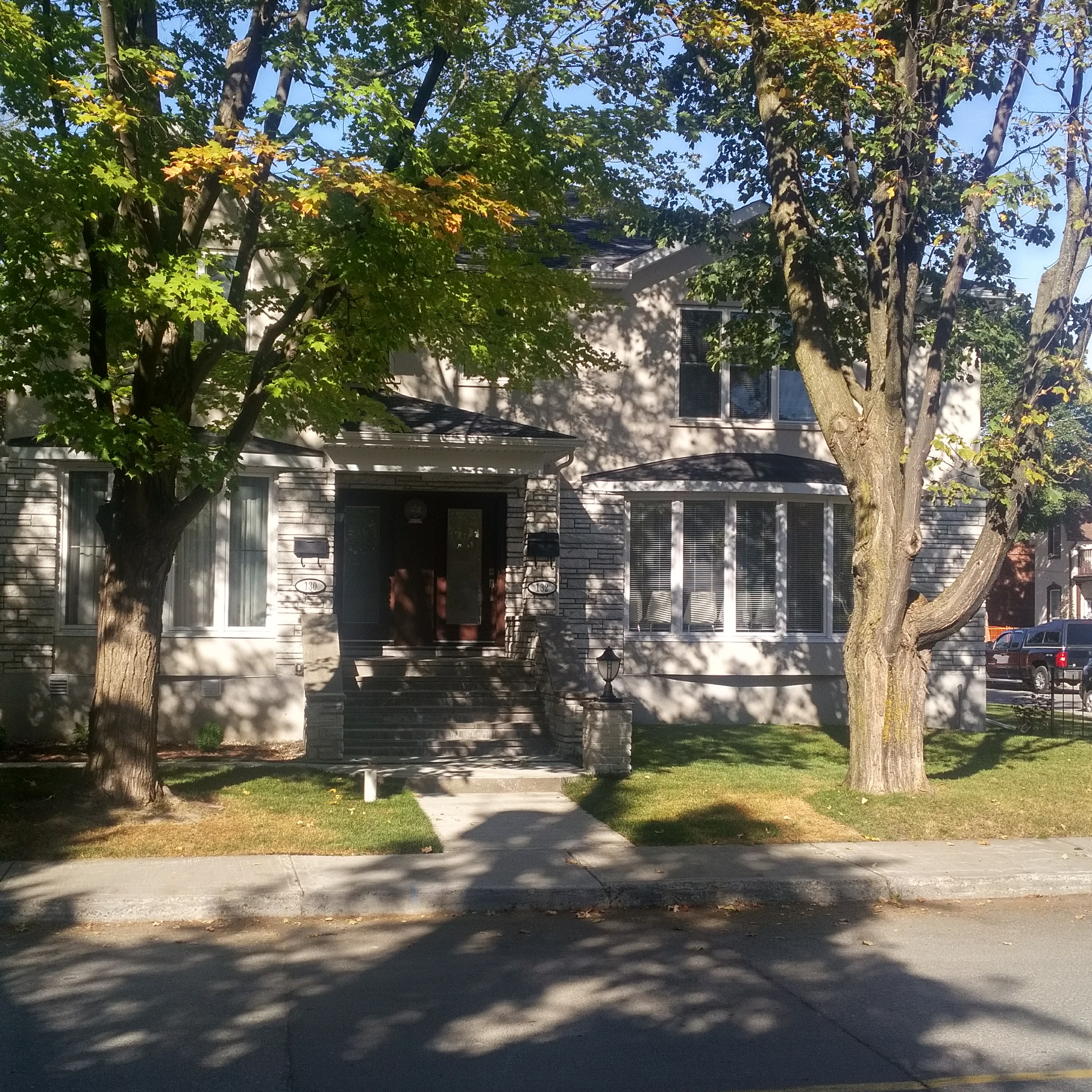
Embassy in Ottawa

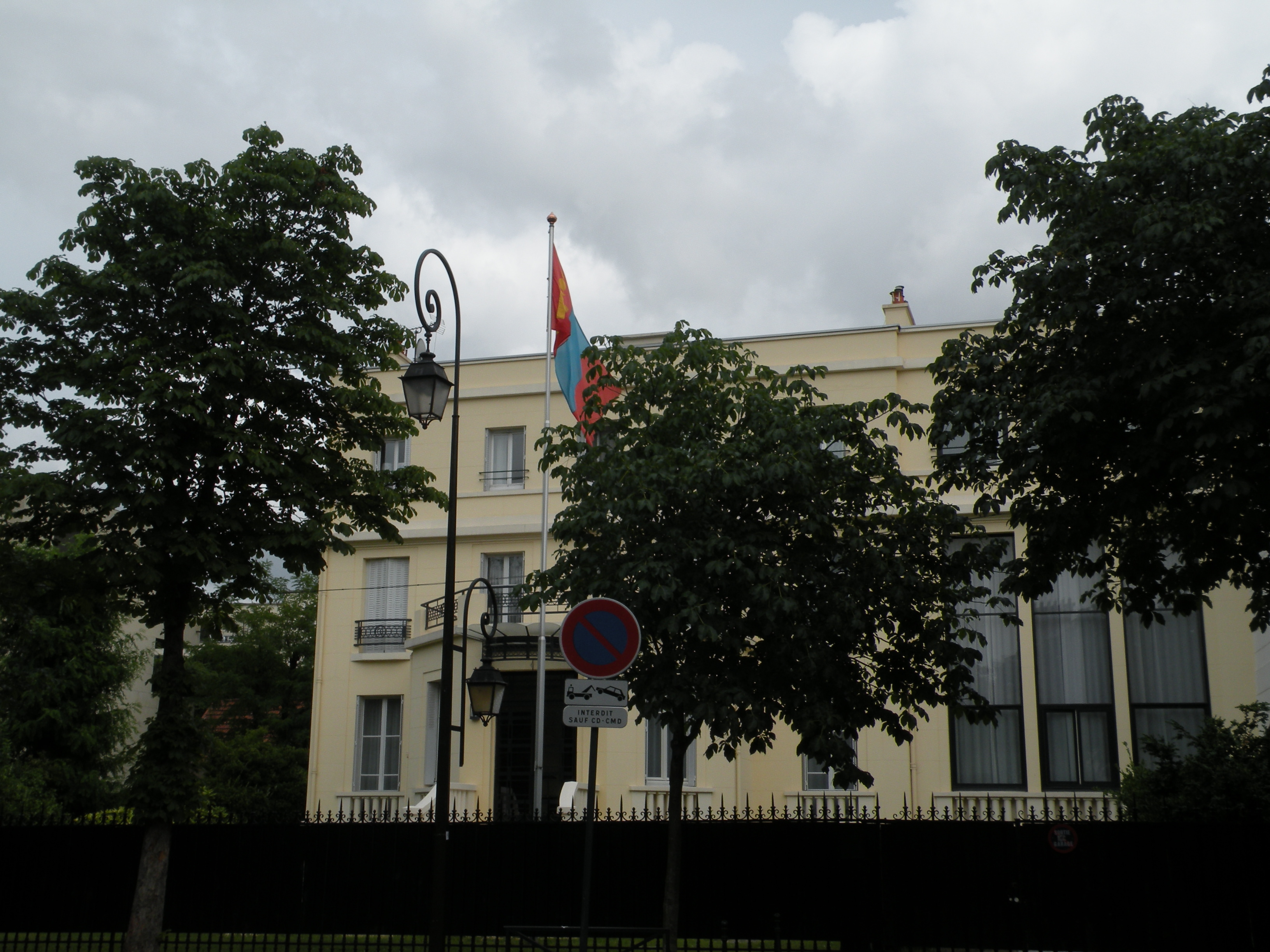
Embassy in Paris

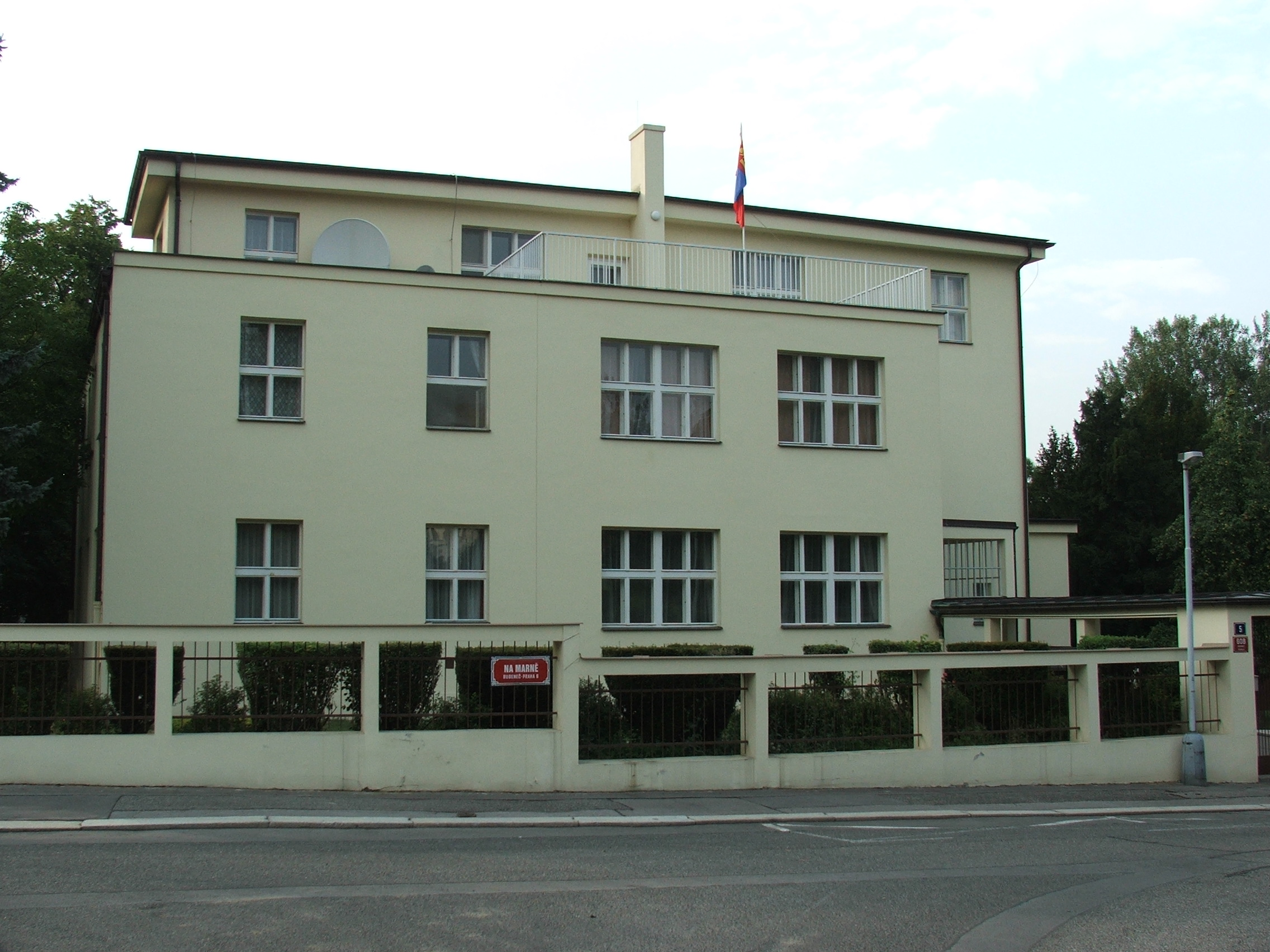
Embassy in Prague

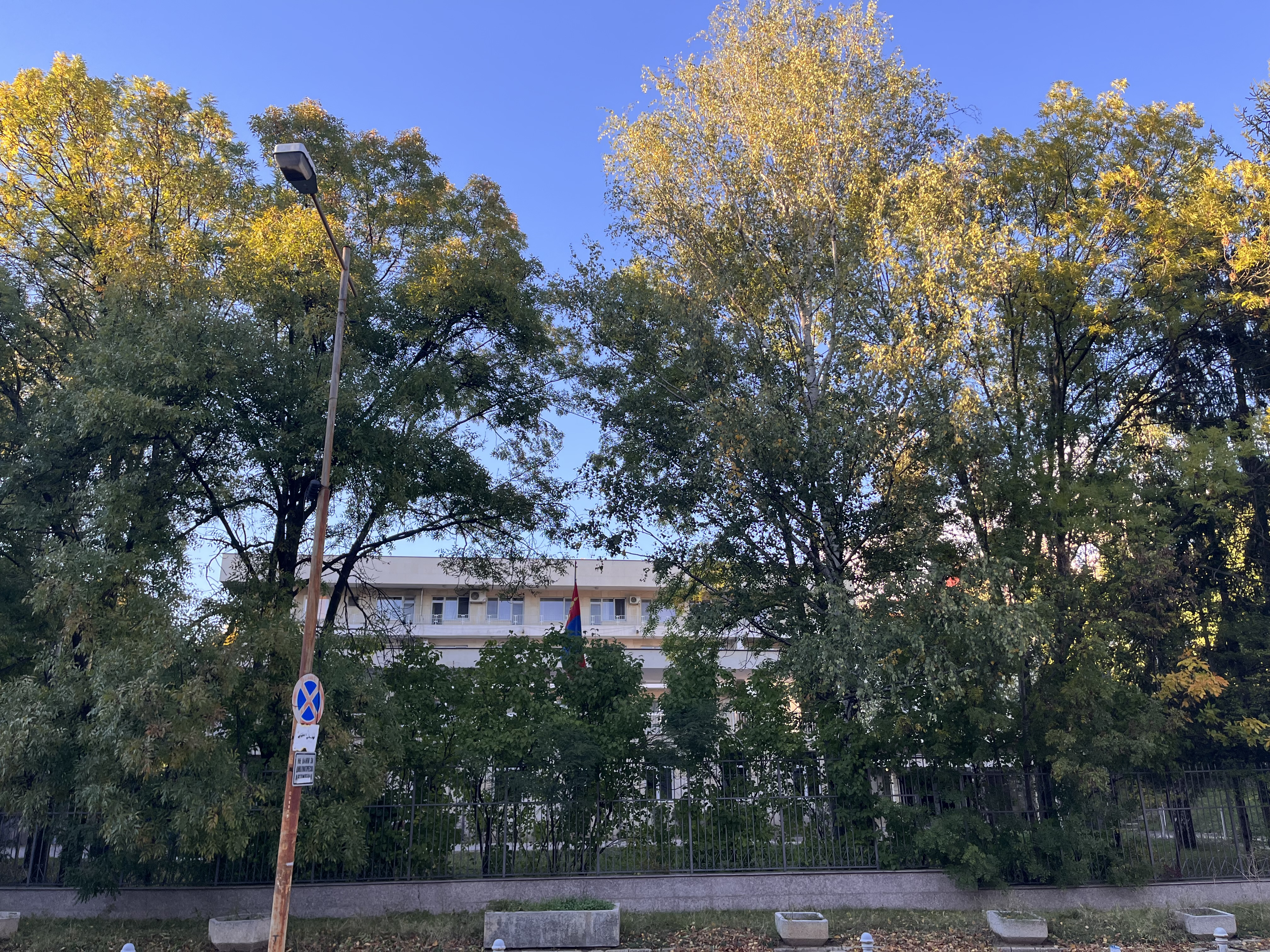
Embassy in Sofia

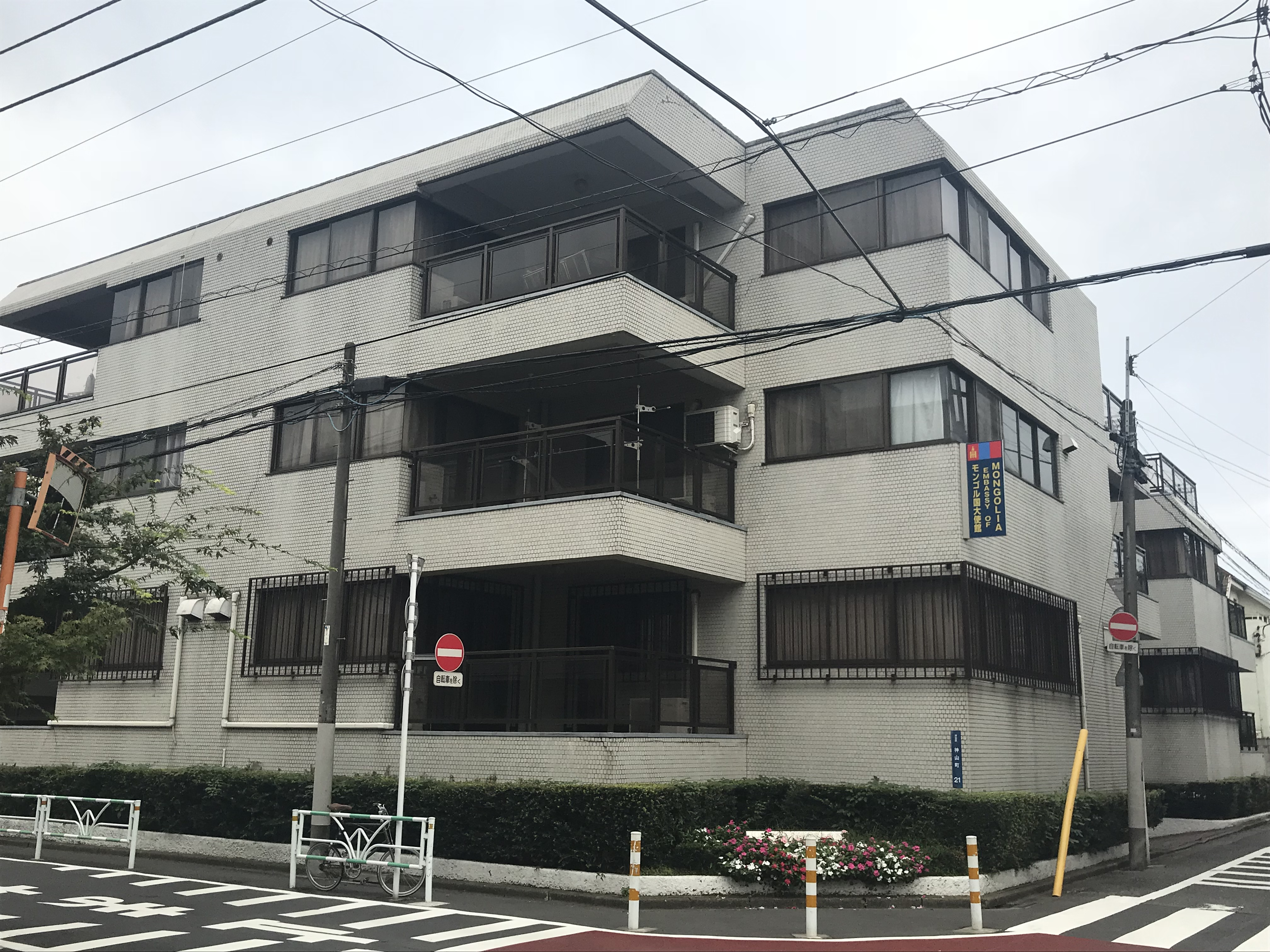
Embassy in Tokyo

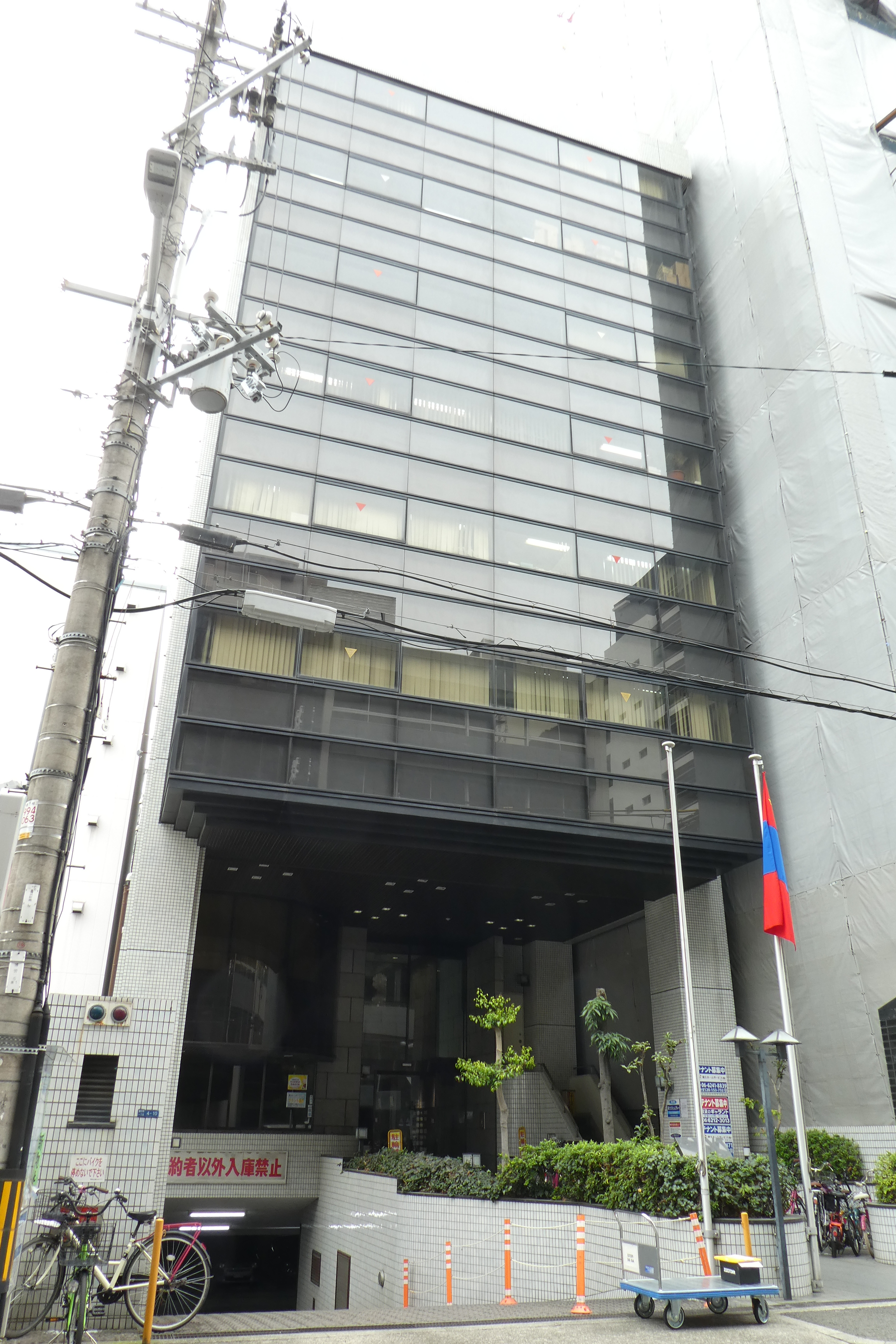
Building hosting the Consulate-General in Osaka

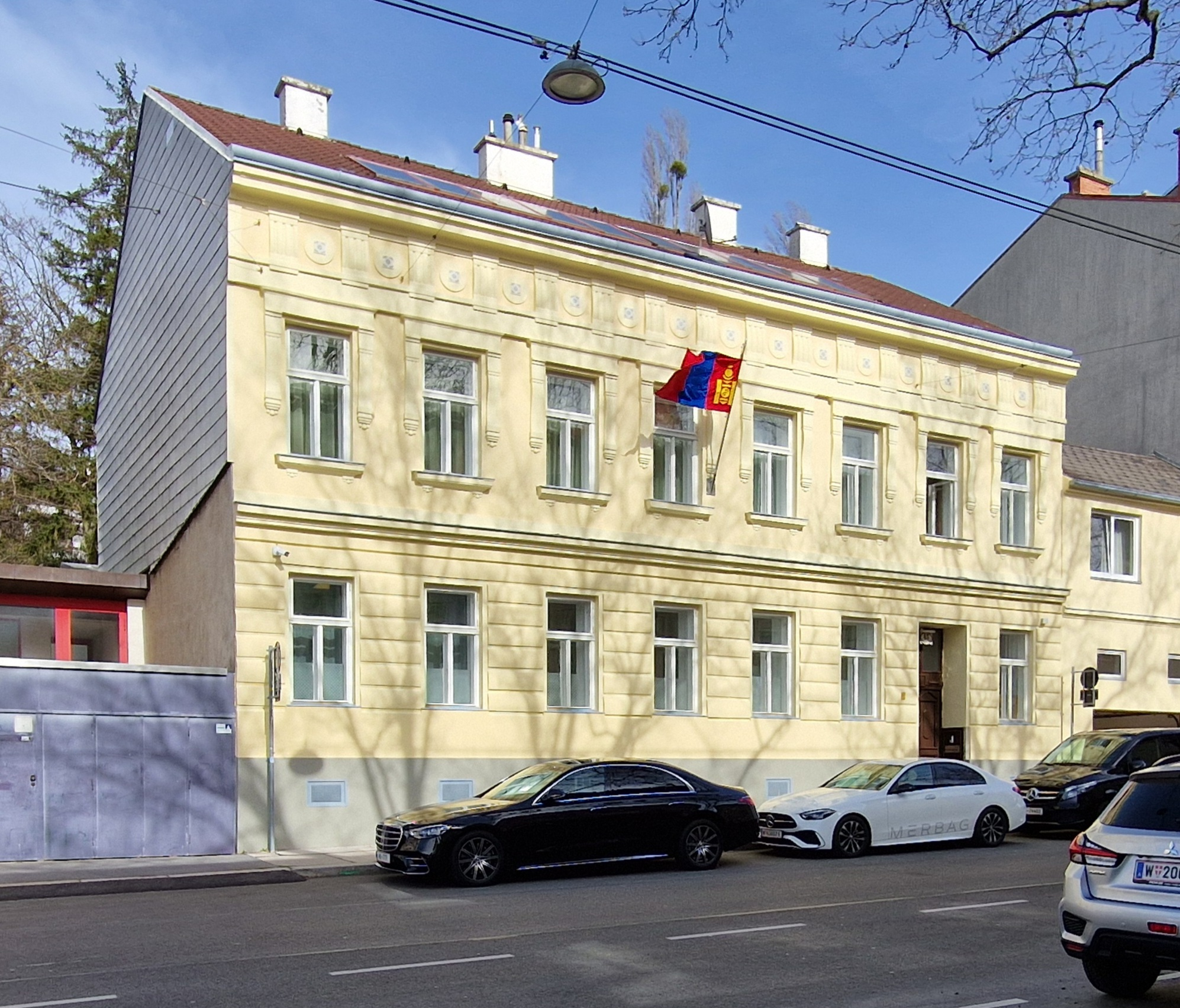
Embassy in Vienna

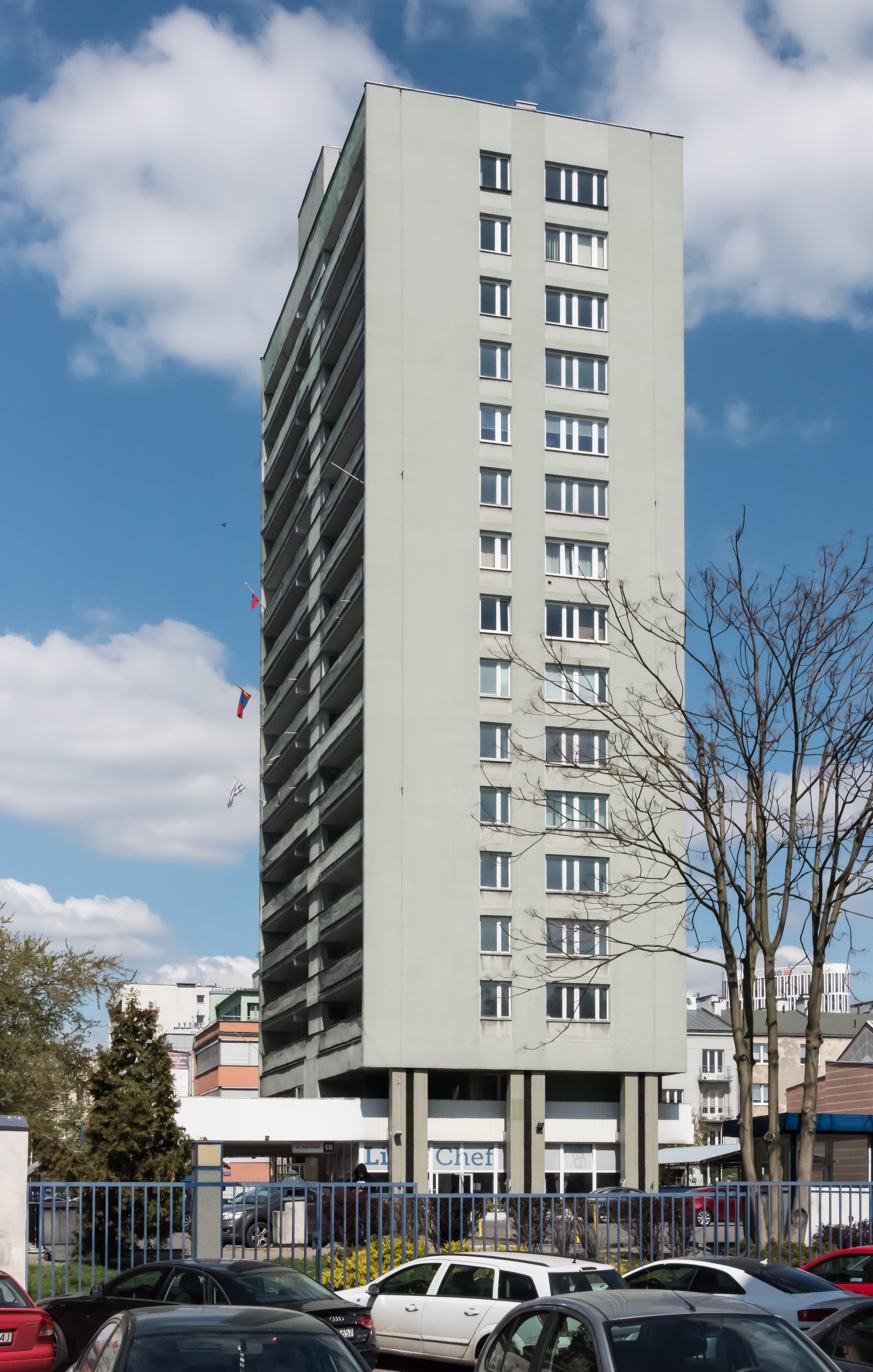
Building hosting the Embassy in Warsaw

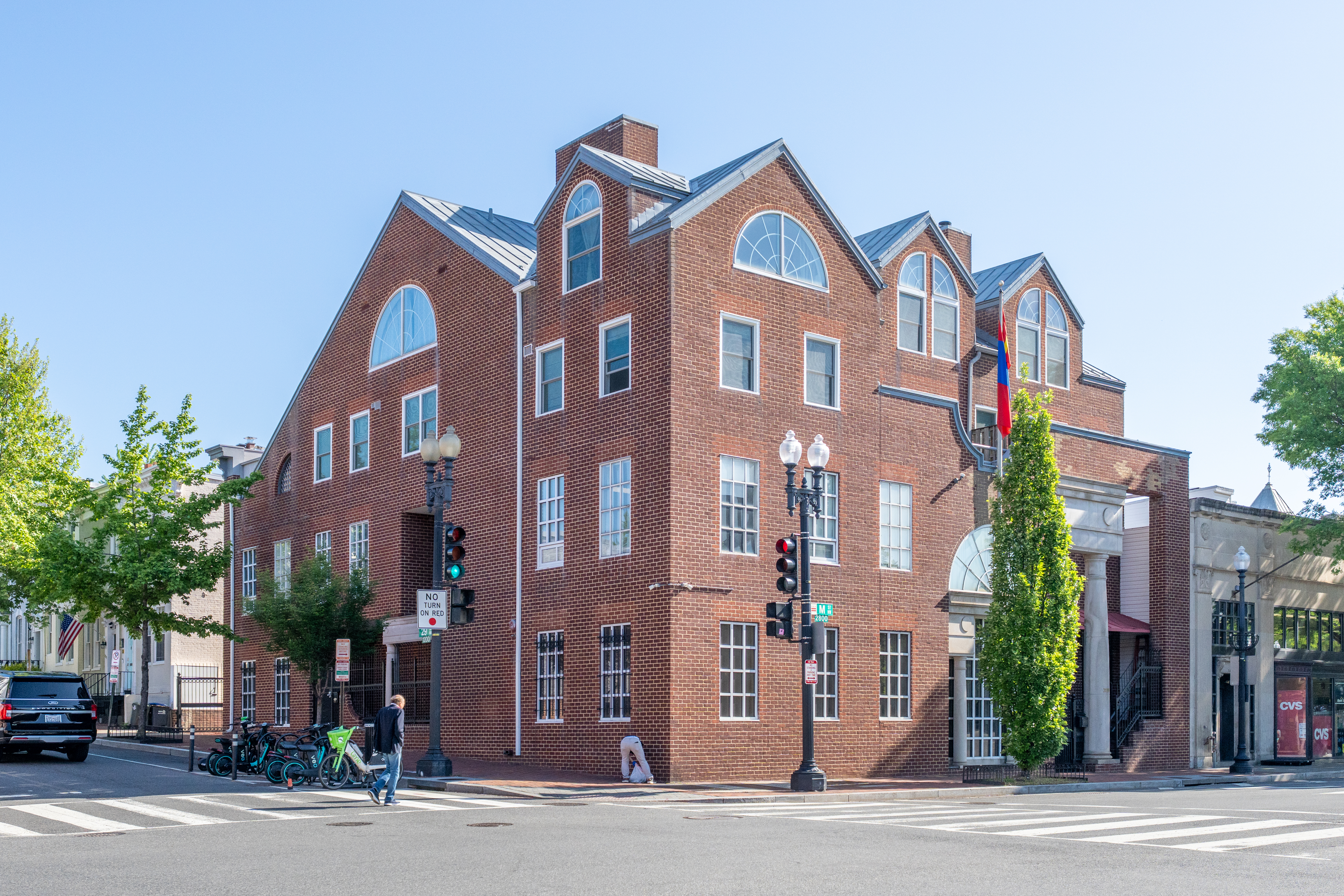
Embassy in Washington, D.C.

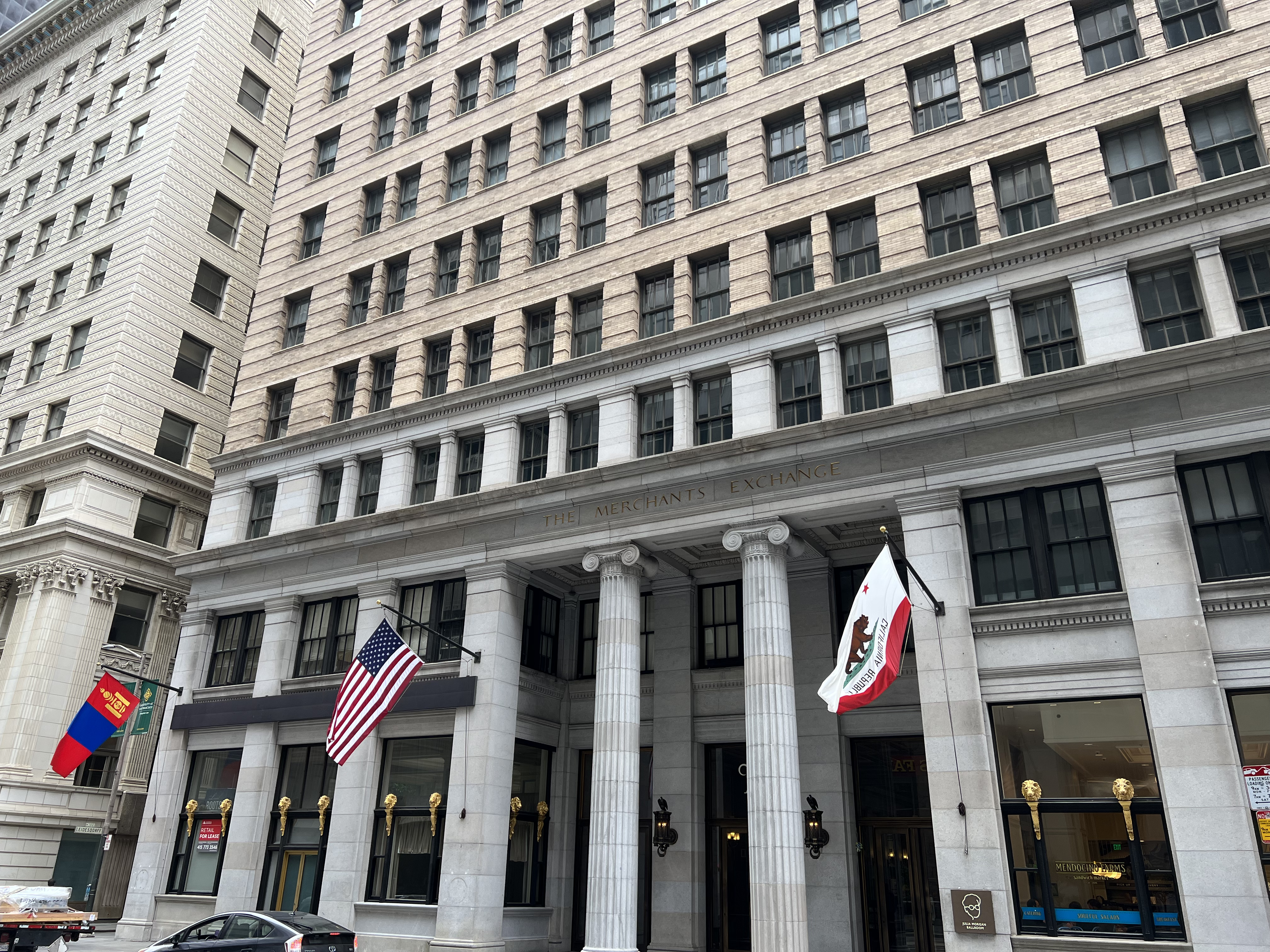
Building hosting the Consulate-General in San Francisco

== Closed missions ==
=== Americas ===
Host country	Host city	Mission	Year opened	Year closed	Ref.
Brazil	Brasília	Embassy (Note: Resident in Havana, Cuba)	2014	2017	

=== Asia ===
Host country	Host city	Mission	Year opened	Year closed	Ref.
Afghanistan	Kabul	Embassy	1978	1992	
China	Hailar	Consulate		2017	

=== Africa ===
Host country	Host city	Mission	Year opened	Year closed	Ref.
Algeria	Algiers	Embassy	1967	1992	
Guinea	Conakry	Embassy	1960	1967	

=== Europe ===
Host country	Host city	Mission	Year opened	Year closed	Ref.
Romania	Bucharest	Embassy (Note: Resident in Sofia, Bulgaria)	1963	1997	
SFR Yugoslavia	Belgrade	Embassy (Note: Serbian resident in Budapest, Hungary.; Slovenian, Croatian and Montenegrin residents in Vienna, Austria.; North Macedonian resident in Bucharest, Romania.)		Unknown	

== Missions to open ==
Host country	Host city	Mission	Ref.
Iran	Tehran	Embassy	
Spain	Madrid	Embassy	

== See also ==
- Foreign relations of Mongolia
- List of diplomatic missions in Mongolia
- Visa policy of Mongolia
