= Ulaanbaatar Trade and Economic Representative Office in Taipei =

Representative office of Mongolia in the Republic of China

- 駐台北烏蘭巴托貿易經濟代表處
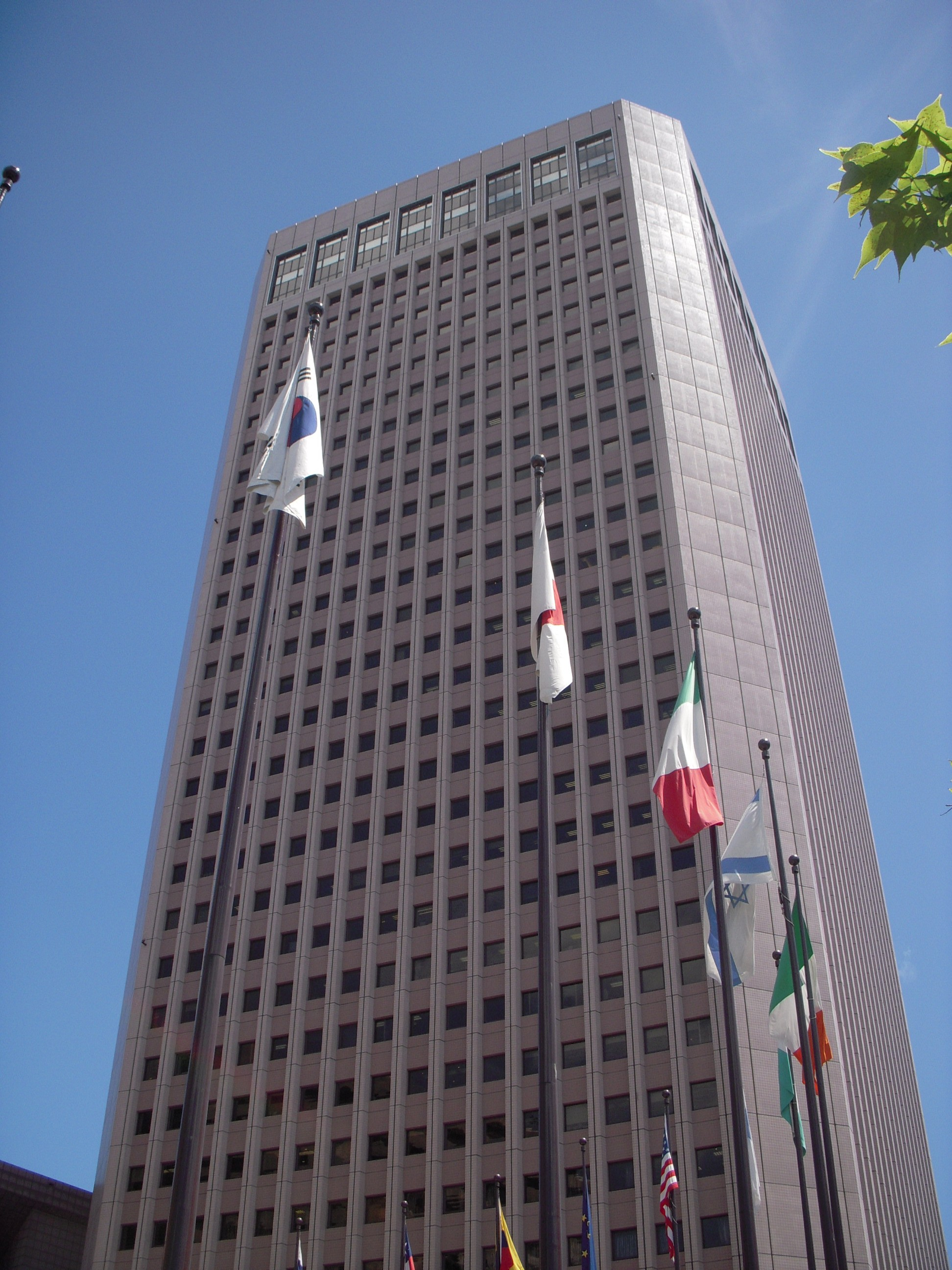
- The Ulaanbaatar Trade and Economic Representative Office in Taipei at the International Trade Building.

Agency overview
- Formed: 2003
- Jurisdiction: Taiwan
- Headquarters: Taipei
- Agency executive: Elbeg Samdan, Representative

The Ulaanbaatar Trade and Economic Representative Office in Taipei (Mongolian: Улаанбаатар Хотын Худалдаа Эдийн Засгийн Төлөөлөгчийн Газар, Mongolian: Ulaanbaatar Khotyn Khudaldaa Ediin Zasgiin Tölöölögchiin Gazar), (Chinese: 駐台北烏蘭巴托貿易經濟代表處; pinyin: Zhù Táiběi Wū Lán Bā Tuō Màoyì Jīngjì Dàibiǎo Chù) is the representative office of Mongolia in Taiwan, functioning as a de facto embassy in the absence of diplomatic relations.

Its counterpart is the Taipei Trade and Economic Representative Office in Ulaanbaatar The Taiwan External Trade Development Council previously established a Taiwan Trade Center in June 2002.

== History ==
The ROC recognized Mongolia's independence on 14 August 1945 and revoked on 24 February 1953 after the Soviet Union supported the Communists. It re-recognized Mongolia's independence on 3 October 2002 and the representative office was established in December 2003.

== See also ==
- List of diplomatic missions in Taiwan
- List of diplomatic missions of Mongolia
- Mongolia–Taiwan relations
