= Mongolia–Russia relations =

Mongolian bilateral relations with Russia and its predecessor, the USSR

- Mongolia: Russia

Diplomatic mission
- Embassy of Mongolia, Moscow: Embassy of Russia, Ulaanbaatar

Mongolia–Russia relations have been traditionally strong since the Communist era, when the Soviet Union supported the Mongolian People's Republic since its establishment in 1924. Mongolia and Russia remain allies in the post-communist era. Russia has an embassy in Ulaanbaatar and two consulates general (in Darkhan and Erdenet). Mongolia has an embassy in Moscow, three consulates general (in Irkutsk, Kyzyl, and Ulan Ude), and a branch in Yekaterinburg. Both countries are full members of the Organization for Security and Co-operation in Europe (Russia is a participating state, while Mongolia is a partner).

According to a 2017 survey, 90% of Mongolians have a favorable view of Russia (38% "strongly" and 52% "somewhat" favorable), with 8% expressing a negative view (2% "strongly" and 6% "somewhat" unfavorable).

== Background ==
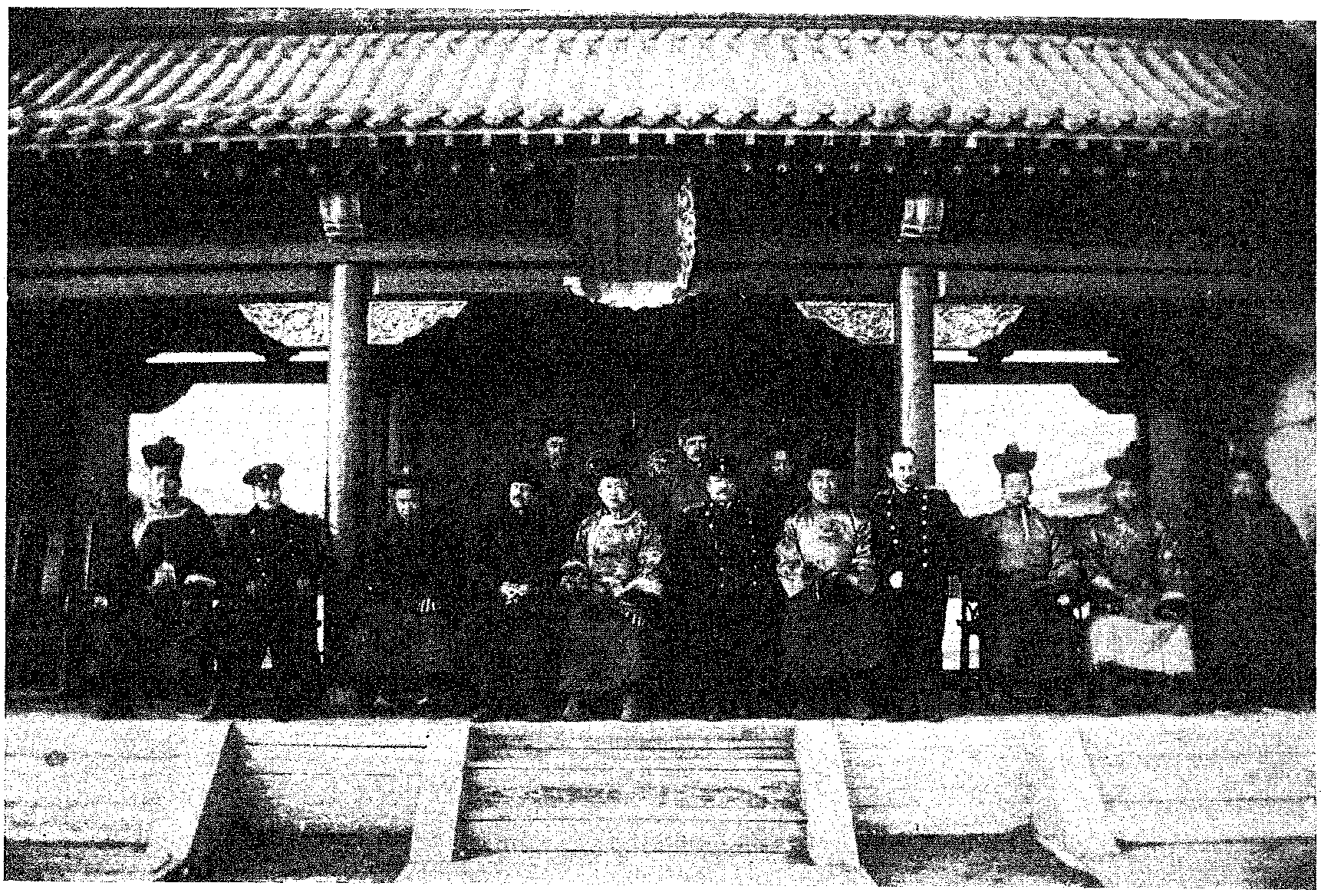
A group of Russian and Mongolian officials, in a photo taken following the signing of the Russo-Mongol agreement in Urga in November 1912, by which Russia cautiously recognized the autonomy of Mongolia and obtained trade concessions

Russia and Mongolia share a 3,500-kilometer border. When Chinese forces attacked Mongolia in 1919 to negate its independence from China, the Russian Asiatic Cavalry Division commanded by Roman von Ungern-Sternberg helped Mongolia ward off the invasion.

The Mongolian People's Republic was established in 1924 with Soviet military support and under Soviet influence.

== Relationship with the former Soviet Union ==
The Soviet Union supported the Mongolian Revolution of 1921, which brought the Mongolian People's Party (later the Mongolian People's Revolutionary Party) to power as the sole legal ruling party of the Mongolian People's Republic (MPR), established in 1924. Over the next seventy years, Mongolia "pursued policies in imitation of those devised by the USSR" as a Soviet satellite state. Mongolian supreme leader Khorloogiin Choibalsan, acting under Soviet instructions, carried out a mass terror from 1936 to 1952 (see Stalinist repressions in Mongolia), with the greatest number of arrests and executions (targeting in particular the Buddhist clergy) occurring between September 1937 and November 1939. Until the end of World War II, the independence of the MPR was only acknowledged by the Soviet Union. Soviet leader Joseph Stalin insisted on the preservation of the status quo of Mongolia's independence and persuaded Nationalist China to recognize Mongolia's independence accordingly to the Yalta Agreement.

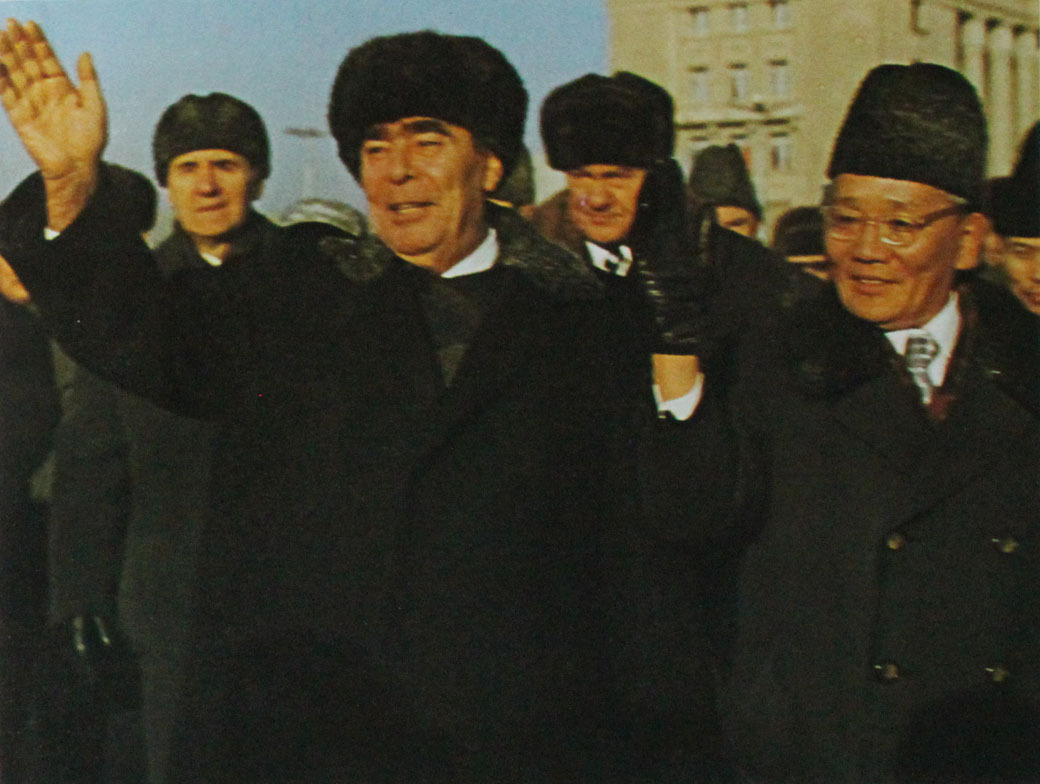
Soviet leader Leonid Brezhnev with Mongolian leader Yumjaagiin Tsedenbal during an official state visit in 1974

Soviet influences pervaded Mongolian culture throughout the period, and schools throughout the nation, as well as the National University of Mongolia, emphasized Marxism-Leninism. Nearly every member of the Mongolian political and technocratic elite, as well as many members of the cultural and artistic elite, was educated in the USSR or one of its Eastern European allies. The economy of the MPR was heavily reliant on the Soviet bloc for electric power, trade, and investment. The MPR collapsed in 1990, and the first democratically elected government took office the same year, leading to "a wedge in the previously close relationship between Mongolia and the Soviet bloc." After the collapse of the USSR in 1991, Russian technical, material, and financial aid ceased, and in 1992, Russia requested Mongolia to pay back all the aid which it had received from the Soviet Union from 1946 to 1990, a figure which the Soviets estimated at 11.6 billion transferable roubles (disputed by the Mongolians).

The communist regimes of the MPR and the USSR forged close bilateral relations and cooperation. Both nations established close industrial and trade links, especially with the Soviet republics in Central Asia, and Mongolia consistently supported the Soviet Union on international issues. During the Sino-Soviet split in the 1950s, the MPR sided with the Soviet Union. Mongolia sought Soviet aid to allay fears of Chinese expansionism, and subsequently, a large number of Soviet forces were permanently deployed in Mongolia. In 1986, both countries signed a treaty of peace, friendship, and cooperation. Following the example of Soviet leader Mikhail Gorbachev's policy of improving ties with the West and China, Mongolia improved its relations with the United States and China. In 1989, Mongolia and the Soviet Union finalized plans for the withdrawal of Soviet troops from Mongolia.

== Relations with the contemporary Russian Federation ==
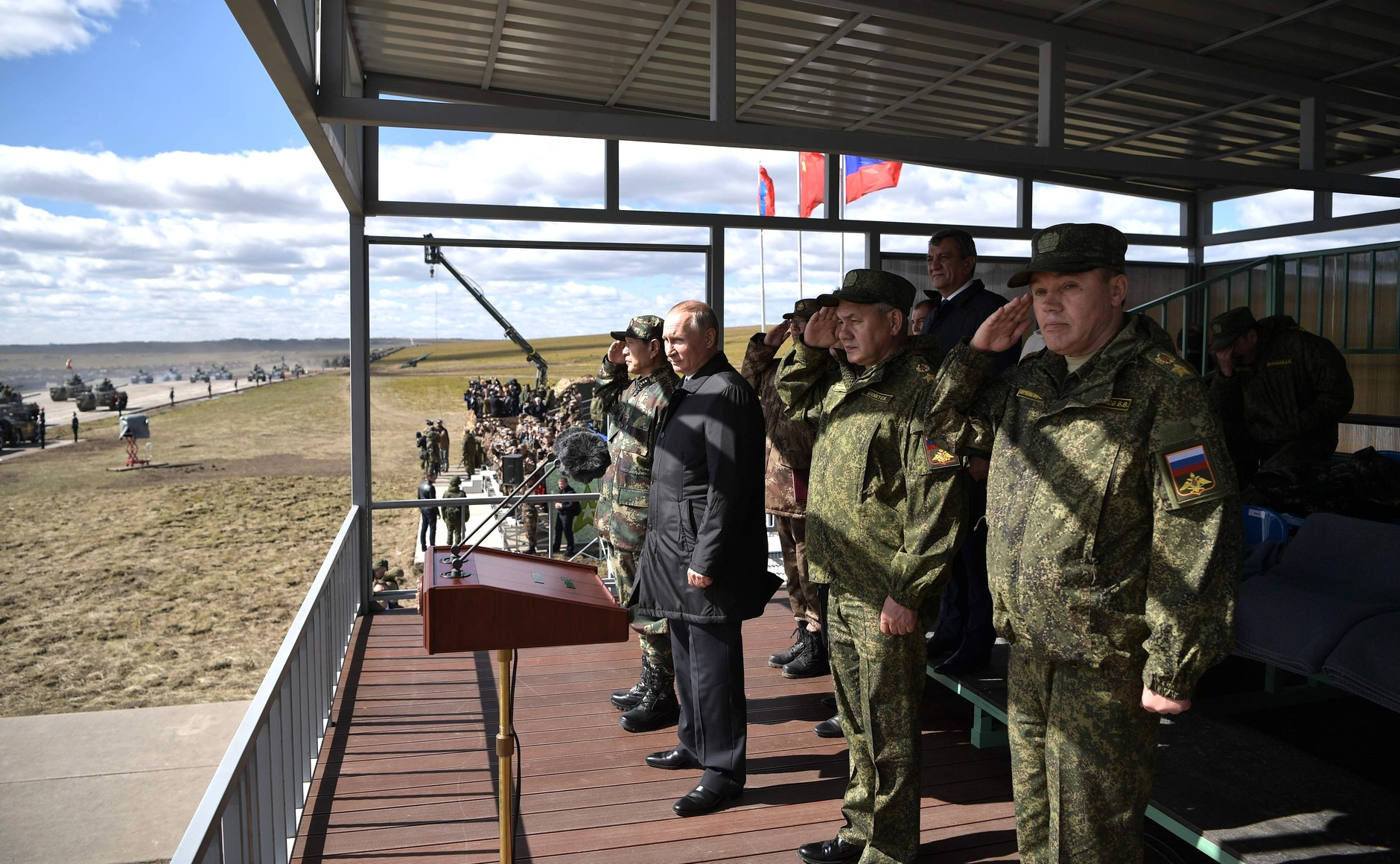
Putin, with Valery Gerasimov, and other Russian, Mongolian, and Chinese troops and military equipment parade during the Vostok 2018 military exercises

Following the dissolution of the Soviet Union and the end of the Cold War, Mongolia's trade with Russia declined by 80% and China's relations and influence over Mongolia increased. However, Russia has sought to rebuild its strong relations with Mongolia in recent years to enhance its standing as a regional power.

In 2000, then-Russian President Vladimir Putin made a landmark visit to Mongolia —the first by a Russian head of state since Leonid Brezhnev in 1974 and one of the first of Putin's presidency— and renewed a major bilateral treaty. The visit and improvement in bilateral relations were popularly welcomed in Mongolia as countering China's influence. Russia lowered the prices of oil and energy exports to Mongolia and enhanced cross-border trade. The Russian government wrote off 98% of Mongolia's state debt, and an agreement was signed to build an oil pipeline from Russia to China through Mongolia.

=== Relationship during the invasion of Ukraine ===
Mongolia's relationship with Russia during the latter's still-ongoing invasion of Ukraine can be best described as cautiously supportive, having made actions that indicate a desire to appease the latter, yet at multiple points indicating harsh critique of the war, and support for Ukraine. Fluctuations in this relationship are generally reflective of changes in government.

==== Pro-Russia stances ====
In March 2022, Mongolia abstained from the UN vote to condemn the Russian invasion of Ukraine.

In September 2022, Russian President Vladimir Putin attended the Vostok-2022 military exercise in the Russian Far East. Beyond Russian troops, the exercises also included military forces from Mongolia, among others.

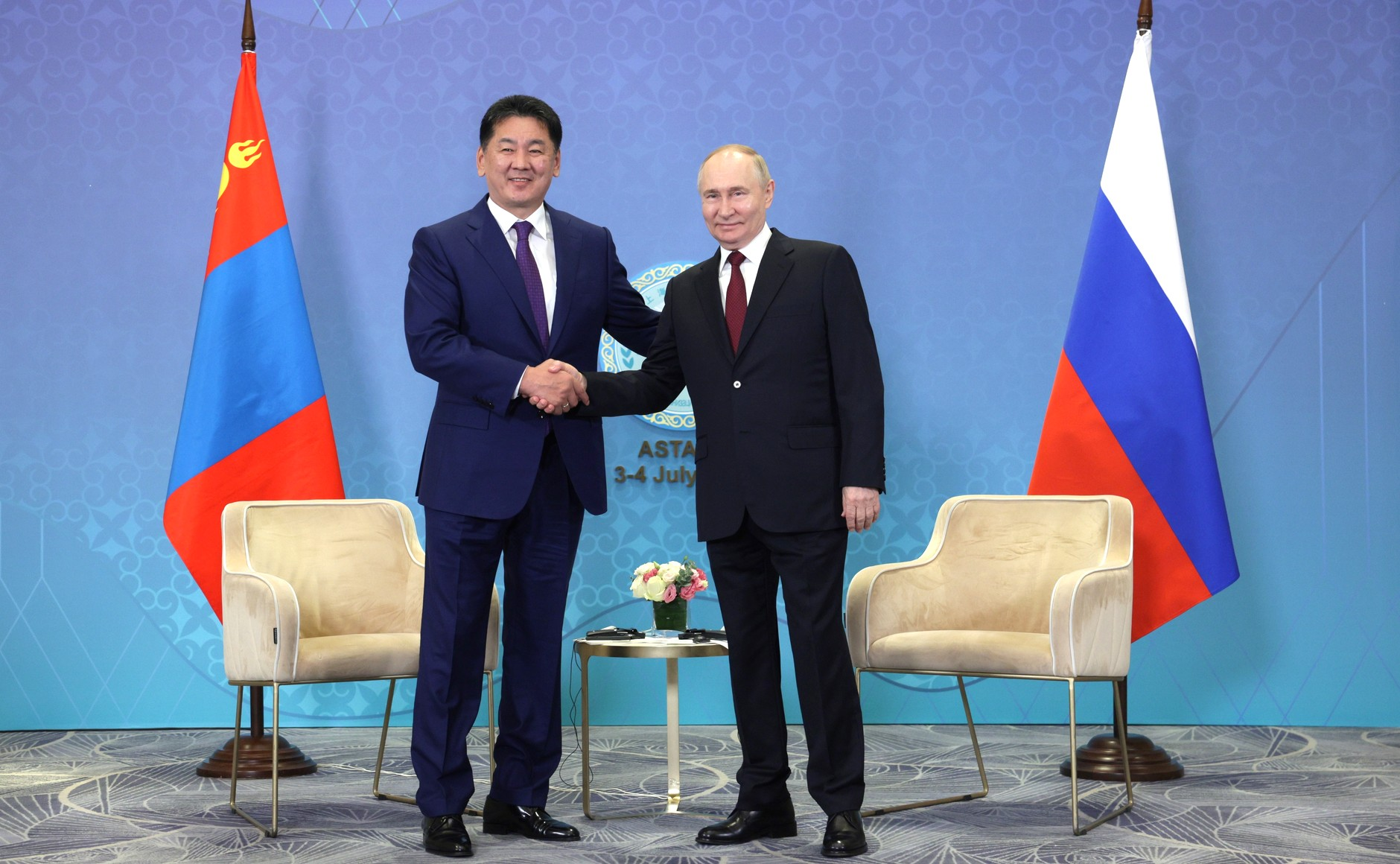
Mongolian President Ukhnaagiin Khürelsükh with Russian President Vladimir Putin, 3 July 2024

The most prominent economic collaboration between Russia and Mongolia is the Power of Siberia 2 natural gas pipeline, the construction of which was expected to begin in 2024. The planned 2,600 km pipeline connecting Russia and China via Mongolia will have a capacity of 50 billion cubic meters of gas per year and could be operational by 2030, generating transit fees and gas supplies for Mongolia.

Due to Mongolia being a signatory to the Rome Statute of the International Criminal Court (ICC), Putin could be placed under arrest by the Mongolian authorities if he sets foot on Mongolian territory. This was issued on 17 March 2023, as the ICC has issued an arrest warrant for Putin due to his alleged role in the unlawful deportation and transfer of children amidst the Russian invasion of Ukraine. In advance of a visit by Putin to Mongolia on 3 September 2024, the ICC stated that Mongolia was obligated to place Putin under arrest.

On September 3, 2024, President Vladimir Putin visited Mongolia, where he was welcomed with a red carpet reception despite an ICC arrest warrant related to alleged war crimes in Ukraine. The visit emphasized Mongolia's close relationship with Russia, with discussions on energy initiatives such as the Power of Siberia 2 pipeline, reflecting Mongolia's strategic balancing act between Russia and China. After failure to make the arrest, Mongolia was described as complicit in Putin's war crimes.

==== Russia-critical stances ====
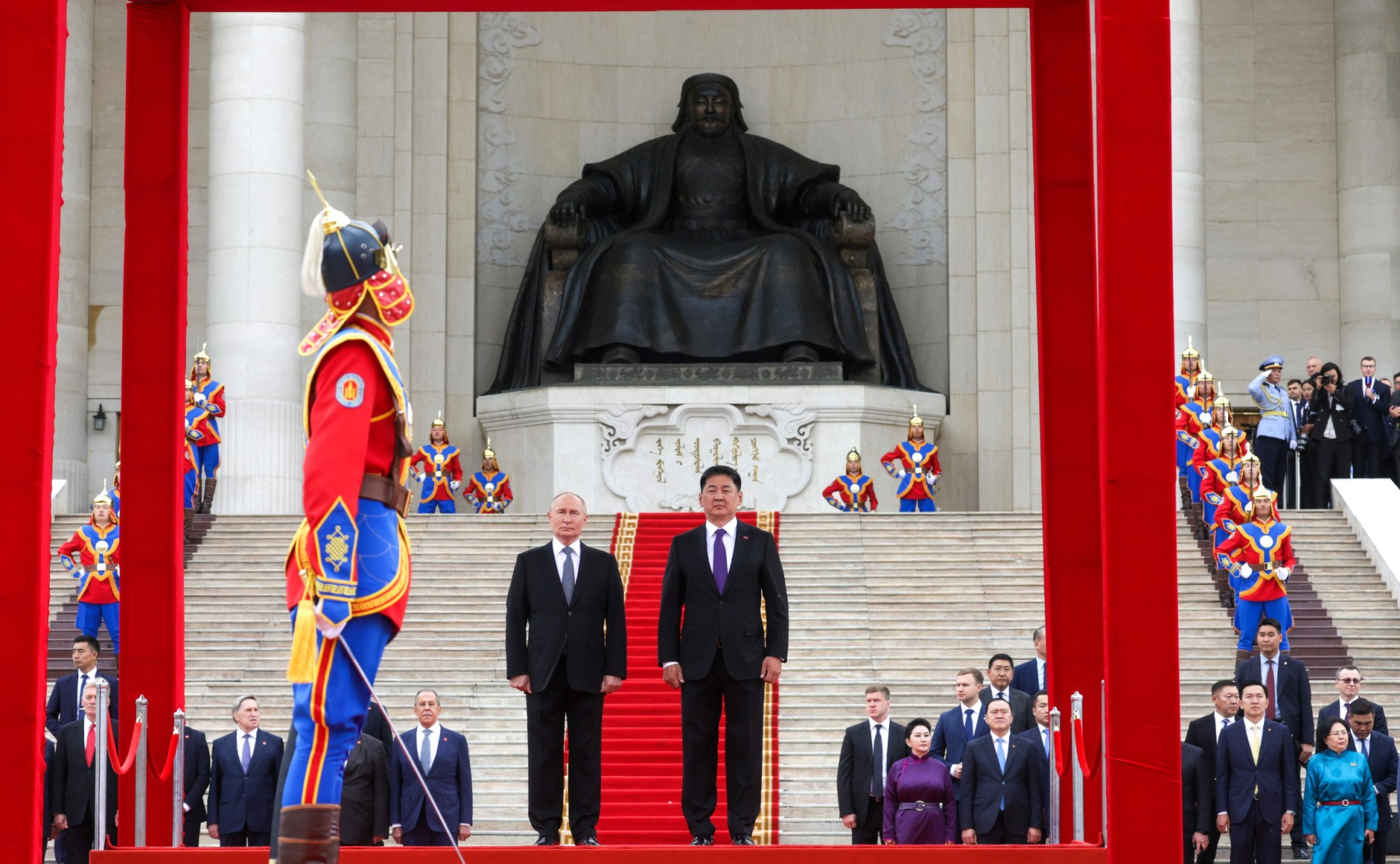
Vladimir Putin and Ukhnaagiin Khürelsükh standing in front of the statue of Genghis Khan in Ulaanbaatar, 3 September 2024

In March 2025, Mongolia's Deputy Prime Minister Luvsannyamyn Gantömör confirmed ongoing negotiations for the Power of Siberia 2 pipeline, which would deliver Russian natural gas to China through Mongolia, further deepening Mongolia's involvement in energy transit between its two powerful neighbors. However, tensions have occasionally arisen, notably when former President Tsakhiagiin Elbegdorj, in 2022, urged ethnic minorities in Russia, such as Buryats, Kalmyks, and Tuvans, to flee and seek refuge in Mongolia instead of joining the Russian military in its war against Ukraine. Elbegdorj, a proponent of Ukraine and critic of Russian actions, framed his appeal as humanitarian, but it raised concerns in Moscow about foreign interference. Despite Mongolia's balancing act between Russia and China, as well as its cautious support for Ukraine, it remains committed to maintaining stable relations with Russia, as evidenced by President Ukhnaagiin Khürelsükh’s 2024 welcome of Vladimir Putin.

== State visits ==
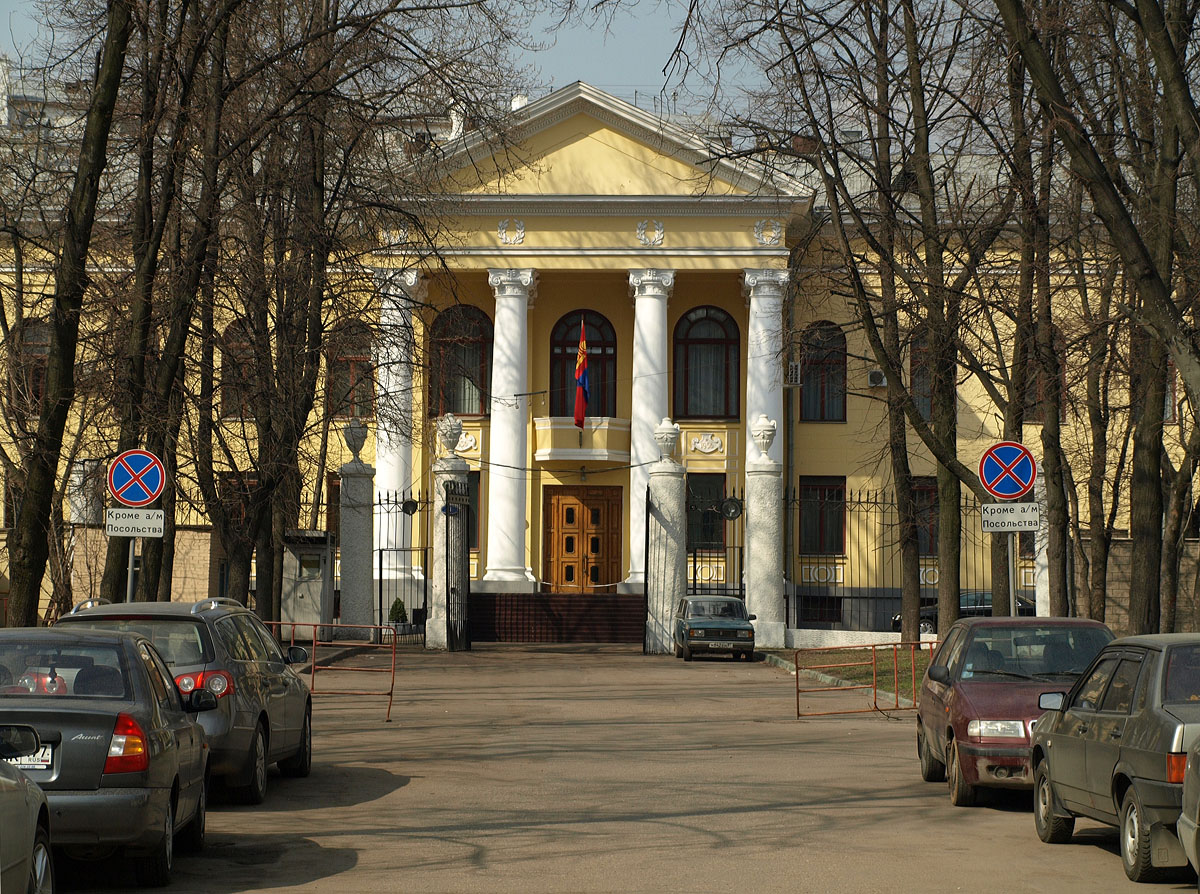
Embassy of Mongolia in Moscow

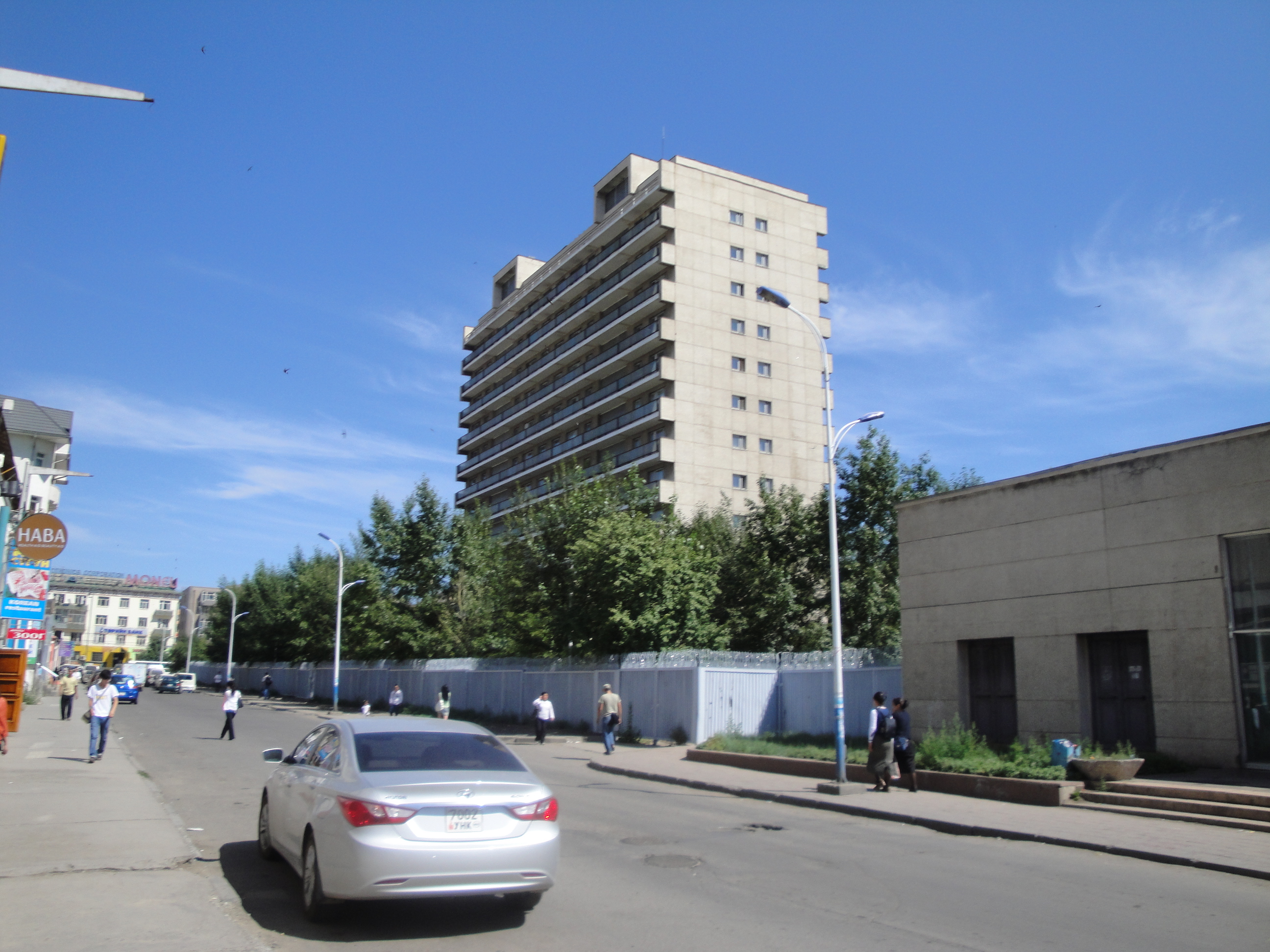
Embassy of the Russian Federation in Ulaanbaatar

=== From Soviet and Russian leaders to Mongolia ===
- Leonid Brezhnev (13-15 January 1966)
- Leonid Brezhnev (November 1974)
- Vladimir Putin (2000)
- Dmitry Medvedev (2-3 September 2009)
- Vladimir Putin (2-3 September 2014)
- Vladimir Putin (2-3 September 2019)
- Vladimir Putin (2-3 September 2024)

=== From Mongolian leaders to Russia ===
- Damdin Sükhbaatar (1921)
- Punsalmaagiin Ochirbat (1993)
- Natsagiin Bagabandi (1999)
- Natsagiin Bagabandi (9 May 2005)
- Nambaryn Enkhbayar (2006)
- Nambaryn Enkhbayar (2008)
- Tsakhiagiin Elbegdorj (9 May 2010)
- Tsakhiagiin Elbegdorj (31 May 2011)
- Tsakhiagiin Elbegdorj (9 May 2015)
- Khaltmaagiin Battulga (7 September 2017)
- Ukhnaagiin Khürelsükh (8 May 2025)

== Gallery ==
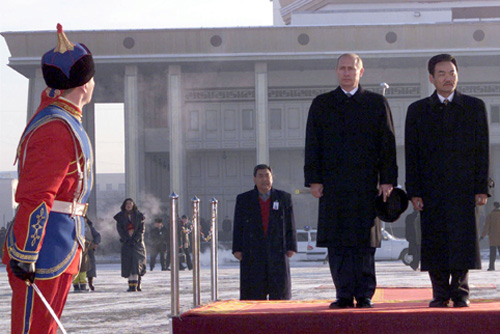
Natsagiin Bagabandi with Vladimir Putin in 2000

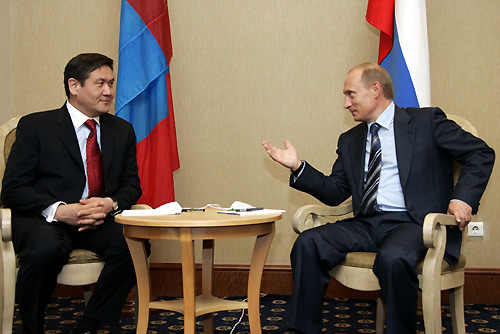
Nambaryn Enkhbayar with Vladimir Putin in 2005

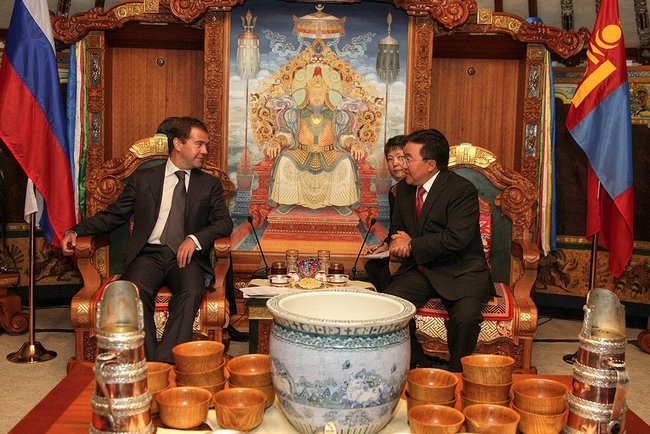
Dmitry Medvedev with Tsakhiagiin Elbedorj in 2009

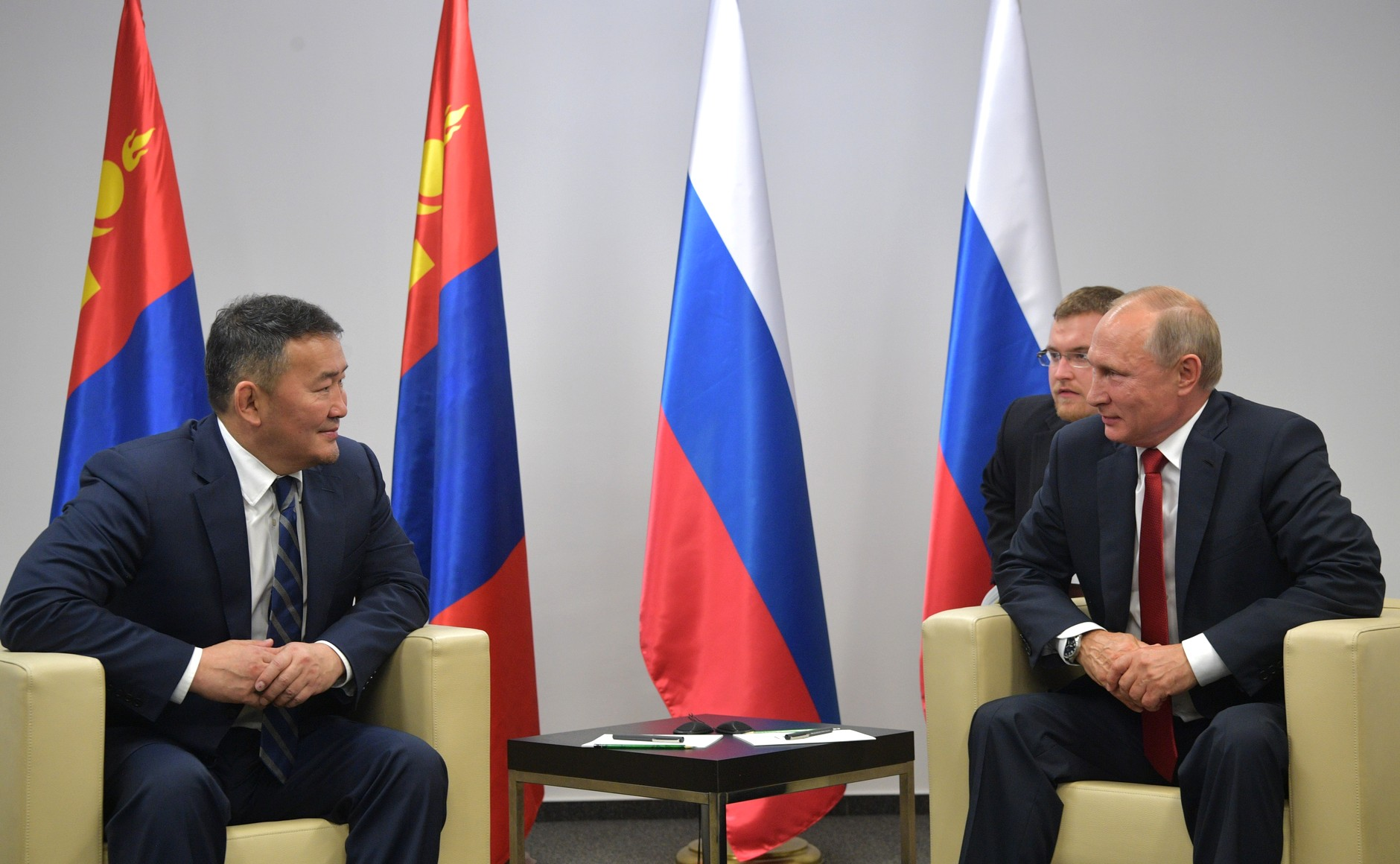
Khaltmaagiin Battulga with Vladimir Putin in 2017

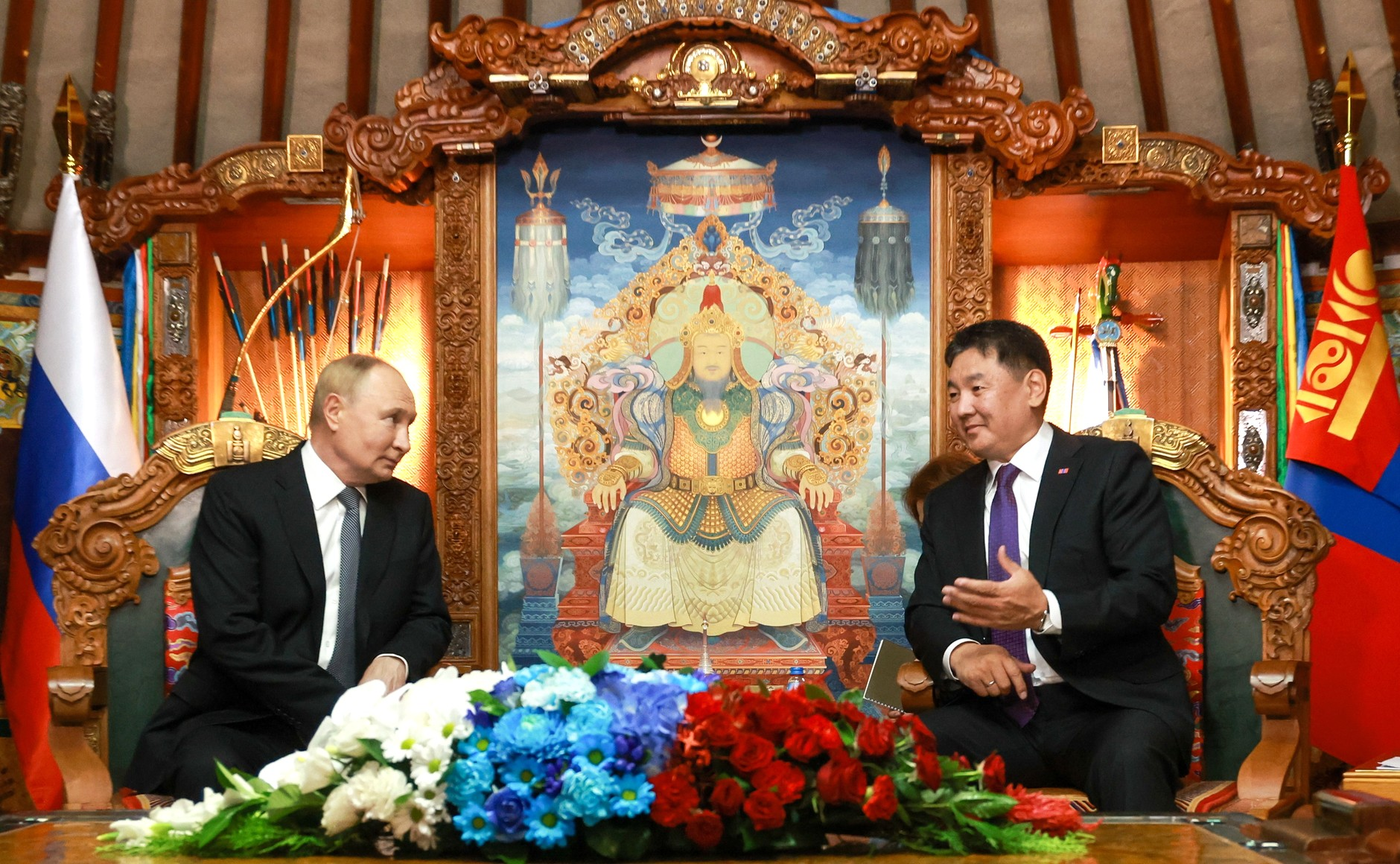
Ukhnaagiin Khürelsükh with Vladimir Putin in 2024

== See also ==
- Foreign relations of Mongolia
- Foreign relations of Russia
- Mongolia–Russia border
- Mongol invasion of Kievan Rus'
- List of ambassadors of Russia to Mongolia
