= List of diplomatic missions in Mongolia =

This is a list of diplomatic missions in Mongolia. The capital city Ulaanbaatar currently hosts 26 embassies. Many other countries have non-resident embassies either resident in Beijing, Seoul, or elsewhere.

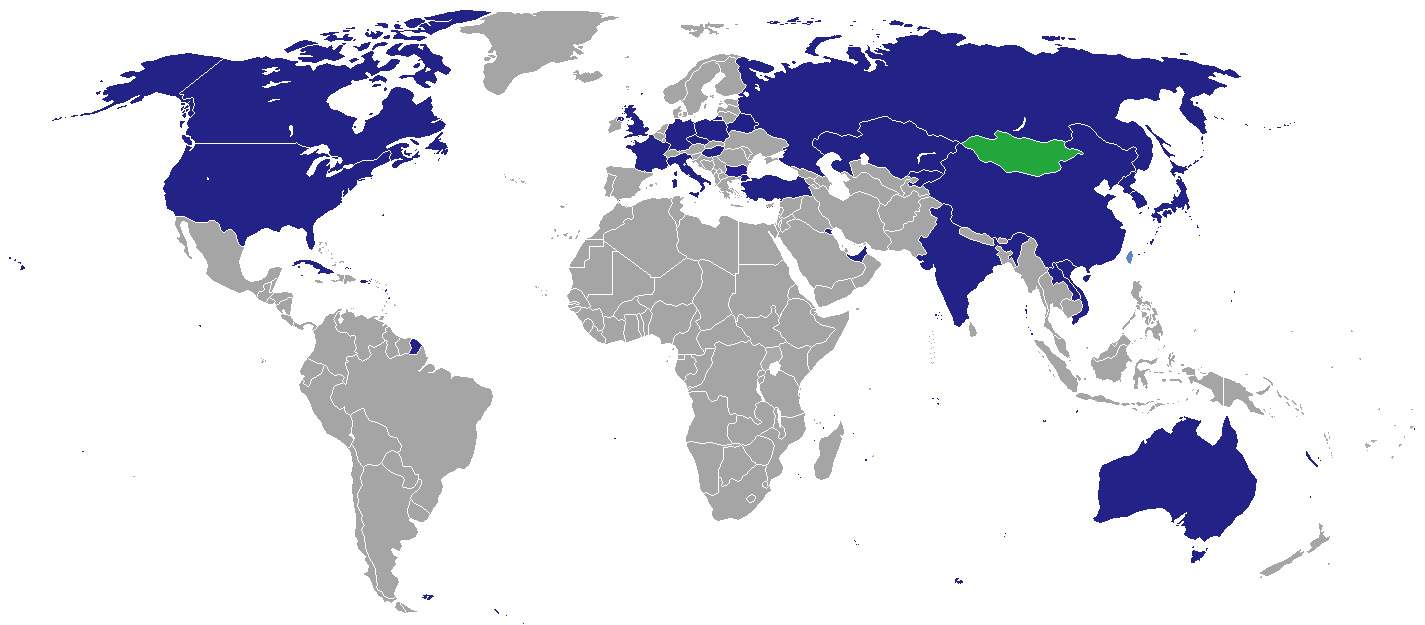
Map of diplomatic missions in Mongolia

== Diplomatic missions in Ulaanbaatar ==
=== Embassies ===
1. Australia
2. Belarus
3. Bulgaria
4. Canada
5. China
6. Cuba
7. Czech Republic
8. France
9. Germany
10. Hungary
11. India
12. Italy
13. Japan
14. Kazakhstan
15. Kuwait
16. Kyrgyzstan
17. Laos
18. Democratic People's Republic of Korea
19. Poland
20. Russia
21. Republic of Korea
22. Turkey
23. United Arab Emirates
24. United Kingdom
25. United States
26. Vietnam

=== Other missions or delegations ===
- European Union (Delegation)
- Republic of China (Taiwan) (Trade & Economic Representation Office)

== Consular missions ==
=== Darkhan ===
- Russia (Consulate-General)

=== Erdenet ===
- Russia (Consulate-General)

=== Zamyn-Üüd ===
- China (Consulate-General)

== Accredited embassies ==
Resident in Beijing, China:

- Afghanistan
- Albania
- Algeria
- Angola
- Armenia
- Argentina
- Austria
- Bangladesh
- Bahrain
- Belgium
- Benin
- Bosnia and Herzegovina
- Brazil
- Brunei
- Cambodia
- Central African Republic
- Congo-Brazzaville
- Croatia
- Cyprus
- Denmark
- Egypt
- Estonia
- Ethiopia
- Finland
- Gambia
- Georgia
- Greece
- Guinea-Bissau
- Iceland
- Indonesia
- Iran
- Iraq
- Ireland
- Israel
- Jordan
- Kenya
- Latvia
- Lebanon
- Lesotho
- Libya
- Luxembourg
- North Macedonia
- Madagascar
- Malawi
- Malaysia
- Malta
- Moldova
- Myanmar
- Namibia
- Netherlands
- Nepal
- New Zealand
- Niger
- Nigeria
- Norway
- Oman
- Pakistan
- Peru
- Philippines
- Portugal
- Qatar
- Romania
- Saudi Arabia
- Serbia
- Slovakia
- Slovenia
- South Africa
- Spain
- Sweden
- Switzerland
- Sudan
- Syria
- Tanzania
- Thailand
- Tunisia
- Turkmenistan
- Ukraine
- Uruguay
- Uzbekistan
- Zambia
- Zimbabwe

Resident in Seoul, South Korea:

- Azerbaijan
- Chile
- Colombia
- Holy See
- Lithuania
- Mexico
- Paraguay
- Singapore

Resident in Moscow, Russia:

- Bolivia
- Ghana
- Guinea
- Mauritania
- Mozambique
- Palestine
- Singapore

Resident elsewhere:

- Bhutan (New Delhi)
- San Marino (San Marino)
- Tajikistan (Astana)

== Embassies to Open ==
- Iran (Ulaanbaatar)

== Former Embassy ==
- Afghanistan (Note: Resident in Beijing, China)(1980-1992)
- Romania(1964-1995)

== See also ==
- Foreign relations of Mongolia
- List of diplomatic missions of Mongolia
- Visa requirements for Mongolian citizens
