= Taipei Trade and Economic Representative Office, Ulaanbaatar =

Representative office of the Republic of China in Mongolia

Taipei Trade and Economic Representative Office in Ulaanbaatar
- Төлөөлөгчийн Газрын Танилцуулга 駐烏蘭巴托-台北貿易經濟代表處
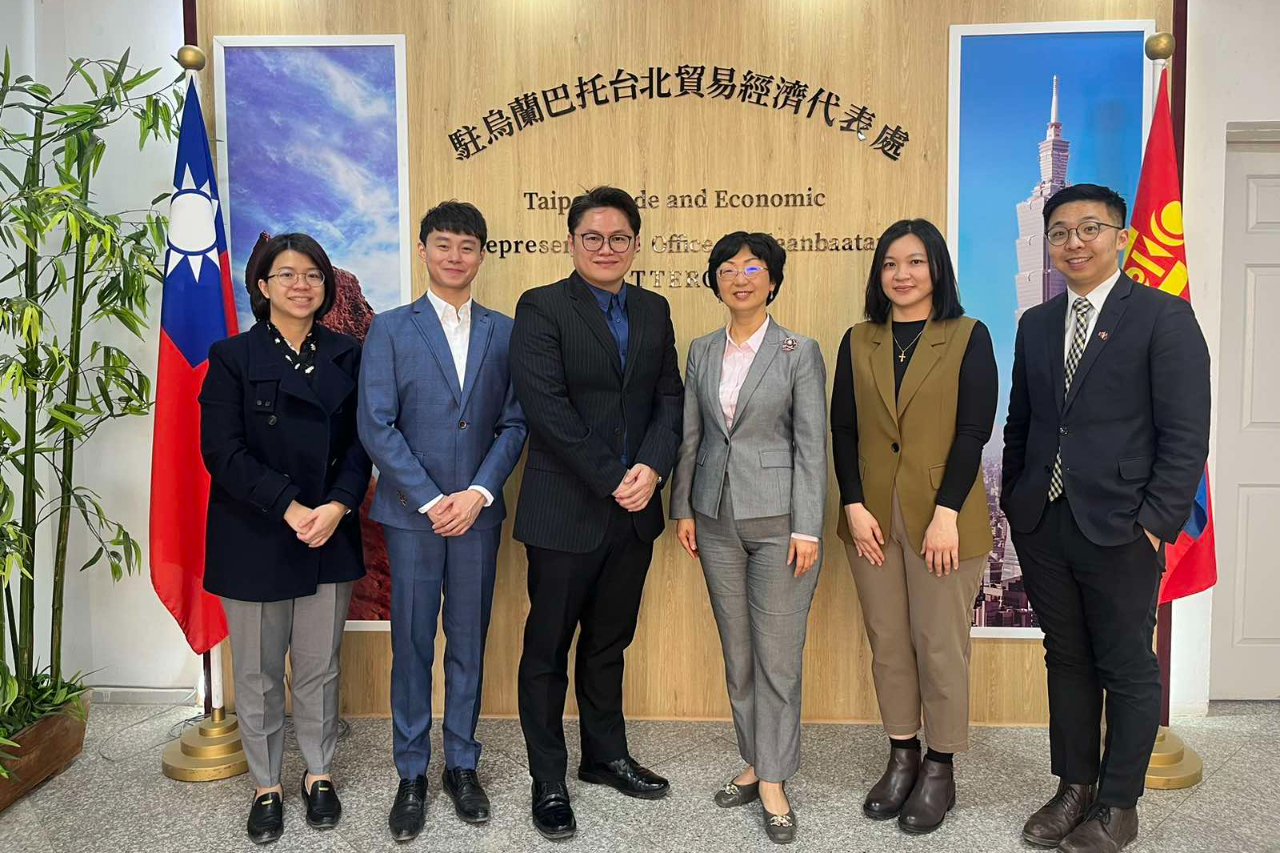

Agency overview
- Formed: 2003
- Jurisdiction: Mongolia
- Headquarters: Ulaanbaatar
- Agency executive: Wang, Kai-yu, Representative
- Website: Taipei Trade and Economic Representative Office in Ulaanbaatar

The Taipei Trade and Economic Representative Office in Ulaanbaatar (Chinese: 駐烏蘭巴托-台北貿易經濟代表處; pinyin: Zhù Ménggǔ Dàibiǎo Chù; Mongolian: Улаанбаатар Хотын Худалдаа Эдийн Засгийн Төлөөлөгчийн Газар) is the representative office of Taiwan in Mongolia, functioning as a de facto embassy in the absence of diplomatic relations.

The Taiwan External Trade Development Council previously established a Taiwan Trade Center in June 2002.

Its counterpart is the Ulaanbaatar Trade and Economic Representative Office in Taipei, which was established in December 2003.

== See also ==
- List of diplomatic missions of Taiwan
- List of diplomatic missions in Mongolia
- Mongolia–Taiwan relations
