= Mongolia–Taiwan relations =

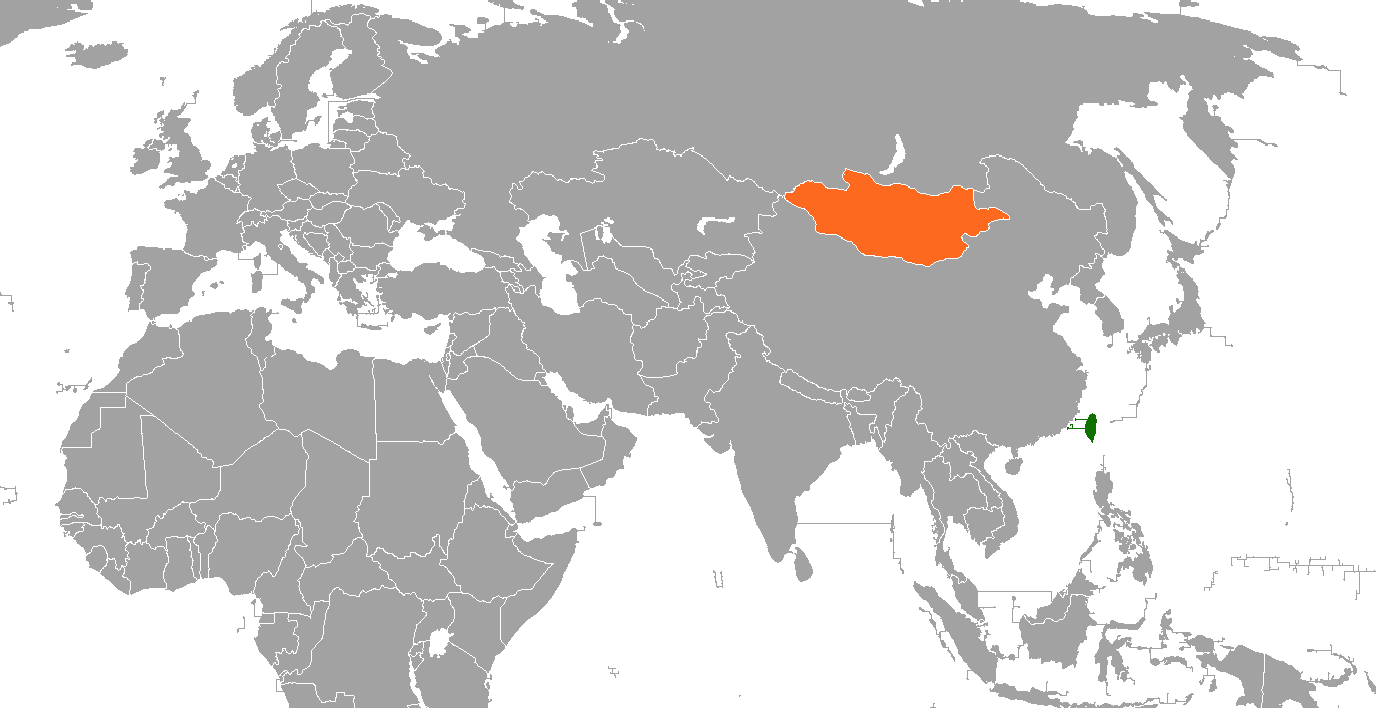

- Taiwan: Mongolia

Diplomatic mission
- Taipei Trade and Economic Representative Office, Ulaanbaatar: Ulaanbaatar Trade and Economic Representative Office, Taipei

At its establishment in 1912, the Republic of China claimed to be the successor state to the entirety of the Qing empire, which included Outer Mongolia. The Republic of China did not recognize Mongolia's independence until 1946; the two never exchanged diplomats. When the Chinese Civil War ended in 1949, Mongolia recognized the People's Republic of China; the Republic of China continued to show Mongolia as part of its territory on official maps until 2002 when they recognized Mongolia as an independent country and established informal relations.

In the absence of formal diplomatic relations between Mongolia and the Republic of China on Taiwan, the two countries have trade and economic representative offices, which function as de facto embassies: Taiwan is represented by an office in Ulaanbaatar, and Mongolia is represented by an office in Taipei.

== History ==
=== Before 1949 ===
Throughout history, regimes on the Mongolian steppe and China have waged war on numerous occasions. China's Great Wall was constructed to ward off invading hordes from the Mongolian steppe and Central Asia. For example, the Mongols under Kublai Khan conquered much of China and established the Yuan dynasty, and Mongolia later fell under the control of the Qing dynasty.

During the Xinhai Revolution in 1911, Outer Mongolia declared independence from the Qing dynasty and formed the Bogd Khanate. In 1912, the Republic of China was established. Although many people of Inner Mongolia sought to accede to the new state, China retained its control over the area and reasserted control over Outer Mongolia in 1919. Consequently, Mongolia sought Soviet Russian support to reclaim its independence. In 1921, both Chinese and White Russian forces were driven out by the Red Army of the Soviet Union and pro-Soviet Mongolian forces. In 1924, the Mongolian People's Republic was formed.

The Republic of China that ruled mainland China at the time claimed Outer Mongolia as part of its territory until 1946. Under the terms of the 1945 Sino-Soviet Treaty of Friendship, the Republic of China was to recognize both Mongolian sovereignty and independence. The Nationalist government of China officially recognized the independence of Mongolia in January 1946 after the 1945 Mongolian independence referendum which voted for independence. However, due to a border conflict on the Khovd/Sinkiang border, no diplomatic relations were established between 1946 and 1949.

=== After 1949 ===
Map of the Republic of China in 1953, which the red annotation in Outer Mongolia shows the ROC had recognize its independent status

In 1952, three years after the Republic of China's retreat to the island of Taiwan (which was retroceded from Japan in 1945), the ROC government accused the Soviet Union of violating the 1946 Sino-Soviet Treaty of Friendship (see United Nations General Assembly Resolution 505). The following year, the Legislative Yuan voted to abrogate the treaty. The Republic of China continued to represent China at the United Nations (UN) until 1971 and used its position as a permanent member of the UN Security Council to block the admission of the Mongolian People's Republic into the UN throughout the 1950s. The only veto cast by the ROC during its membership in the UN was in 1955, against the admission of Mongolia. Thus, Mongolia was excluded from the UN until 1960, when the Soviet Union announced that unless Mongolia was admitted, it would block the admission of all of the newly independent African states. Faced with this pressure, the ROC relented under protest.

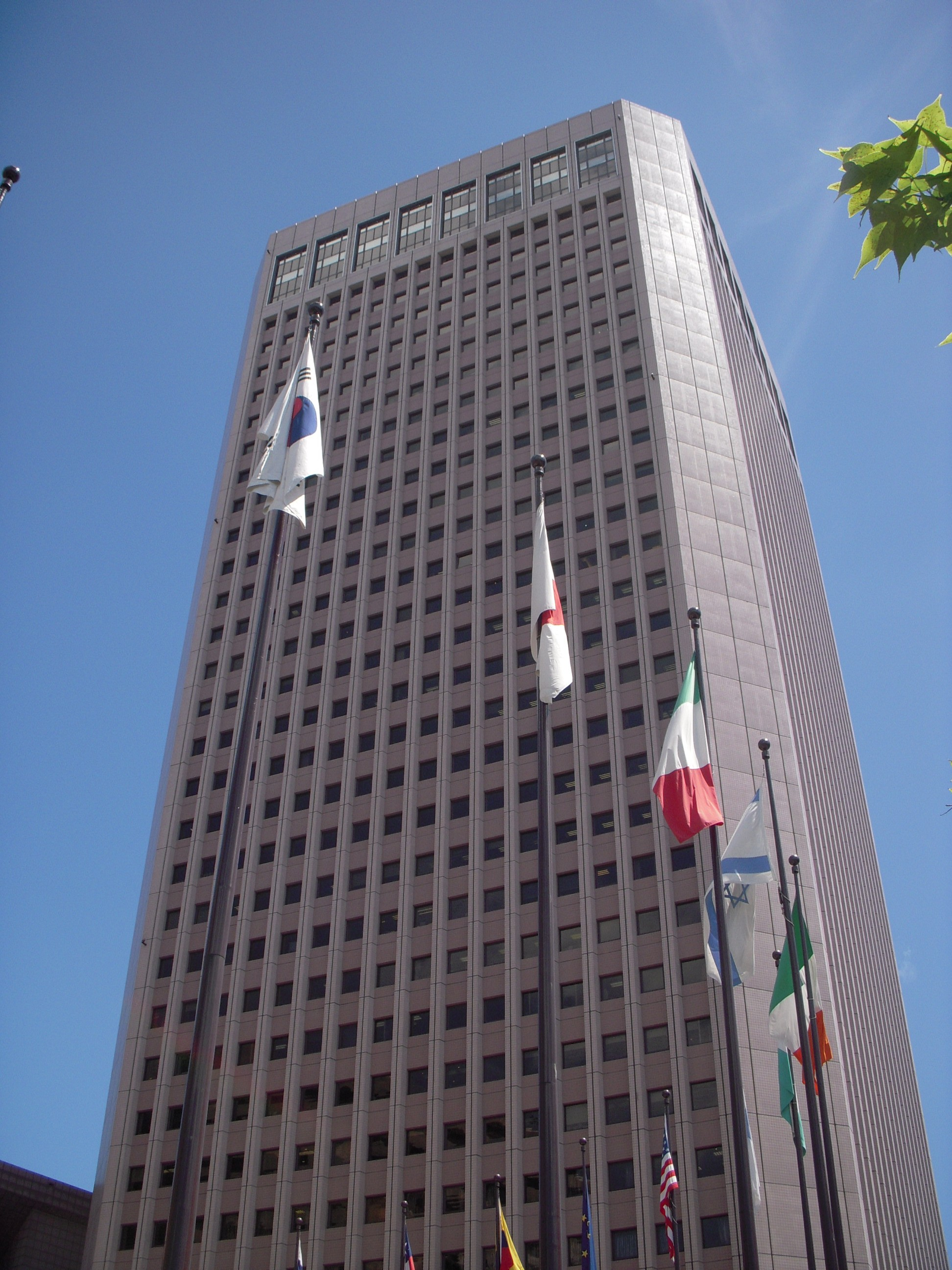
Ulaanbaatar Trade and Economic Representative Office at the International Trade Building in Taipei

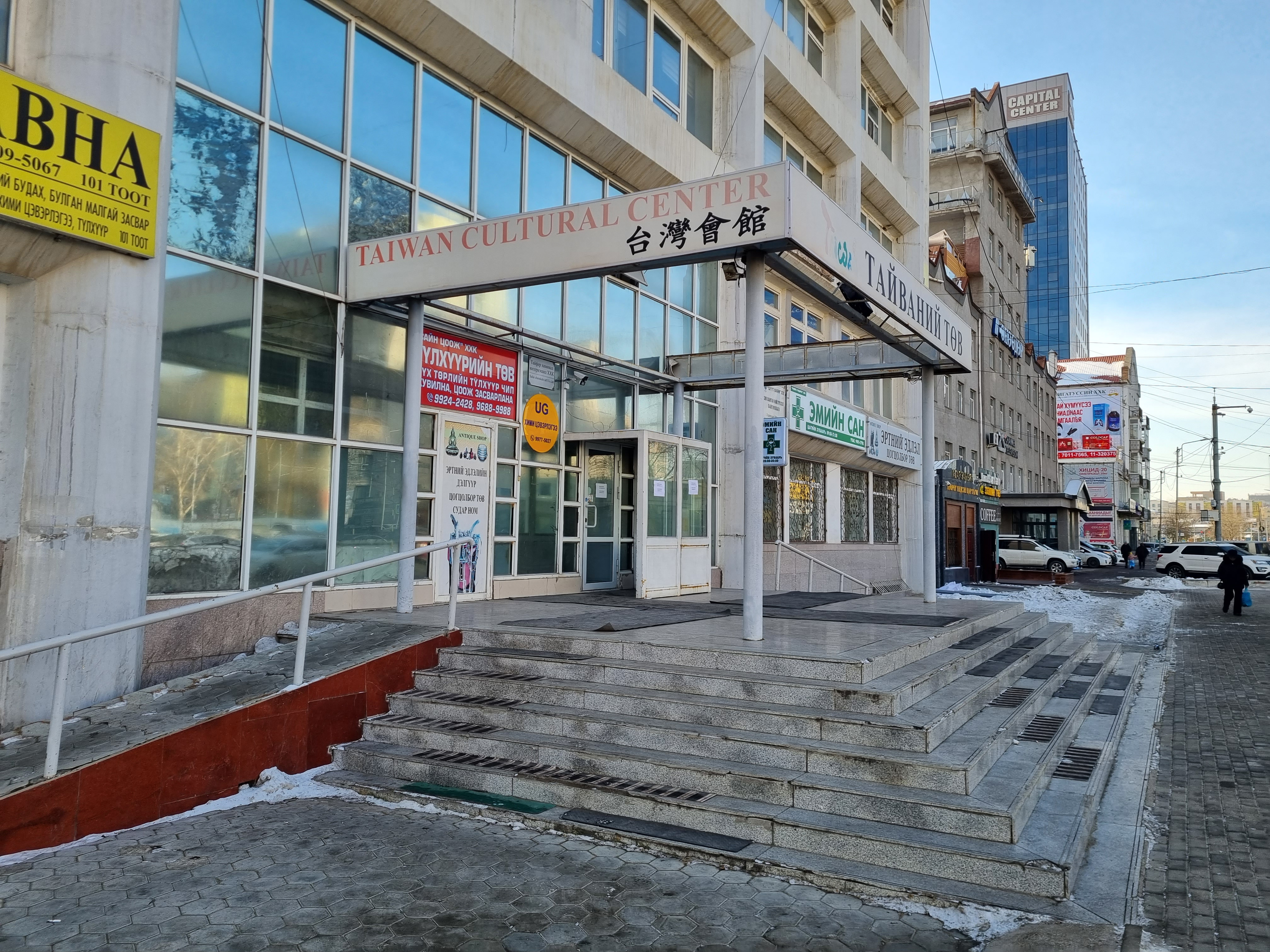
Taiwan Cultural Center in Ulaanbaatar, Mongolia

The Legislative Yuan applied for a constitutional interpretation on 12 April 1993 to ask what the boundaries of the ROC national territory would be, while considering Outer Mongolia not included in the ROC territory. However, the Judicial Yuan in its Interpretation 328 on 26 November 1993, called the constitutional territory beyond the reach of judicial review and thus avoided the question as whether Mongolia should be considered the constitutional territory of the Republic of China.

In 1996, Taiwan's Mongolian and Tibetan Affairs Office director said "The island's National Assembly does not necessarily have to make a constitutional amendment because Outer Mongolia's independence is well established."

Relations changed in 2002, 91 years after Mongolia's first declaration of independence. At the time, the Republic of China still did not recognize Mongolia as an independent country; official maps of the Republic still showed Mongolia as its territory. On January 30, 2002, the Executive Yuan, under the Democratic Progressive Party administration, issued an executive order that stopped the enforcement of the Cross-Strait Act outside of the current day border of the People's Republic of China, effectively releasing Mongolia from its jurisdiction. As a consequence of this order, the Executive Yuan announced that Mongolian nationals would be entitled to visas rather than entry permits when traveling to Taiwan, the same as individuals from foreign countries. The Kuomintang-controlled Legislative Yuan criticized the order, as they had not been consulted in this regard. Later, representatives of the two governments agreed to open offices in each other's capitals; ROC's office in Ulaanbaatar was opened in September of that year. ROC's Ministry of the Interior then decided to discontinue including Mongolia on its official maps of ROC territory, and on October 3, 2002, the Ministry of Foreign Affairs announced that ROC recognizes Mongolia as an independent country. As of 2002, the ROC government recognized Mongolia as an independent country, excludes Mongolia from maps of the Republic of China and requires Mongolian citizens visiting Taiwan to produce passports. In 2006, old laws regulating the formation of banners and monasteries in Outer Mongolia were repealed.

On May 21, 2012, and in clarifying whether the 2002 recognition of Mongolia contravenes the ROC Constitution, which then mandates only the National Assembly can ratify changes to ROC's border, the Mainland Affairs Council of the Executive Yuan, under the Kuomintang administration, states that since Mongolia was not part of ROC's claimed territory during the constitution's ratification in 1947, and the National Assembly never finished the process to reclaim Mongolia after ROC's retreat to Taiwan, the recognition of Mongolia by the Executive Yuan in 2002 is constitutional.

== Education ==
There are approximately 1,400 Mongolian students in Taiwan as of 2019. According to Grace C.R. Lo, during the 2019-2020 school year in Taiwan, a majority of Mongolian students were studying for graduate or undergraduate degrees. Others were studying Mandarin Chinese and some were exchange students. She also reportedly stated that a vast amount of students were majoring in business/finance, while others studied for the medical field or international relations.

According to a study published in mid 2022, the reasons that Mongolian students chose Taiwan over other countries included suggestions from friends, enrollment processes, and visa application. The study also found that most of the students that participated in the research stated that the quality of education in Taiwan was better than that of in Mongolia. This stemmed from the large amount of academic resources in Taiwan.

== Trade ==
In 2017, bilateral trade between Taiwan and Mongolia was valued at US$44.84 million.

== See also ==
- China–Mongolia relations
- Mongolians in Taiwan
- Mongolian and Tibetan Affairs Commission
  - Mongolian and Tibetan Cultural Center
