= Embassy of Mongolia, Washington, D.C. =

Diplomatic mission of Mongolia to the United States

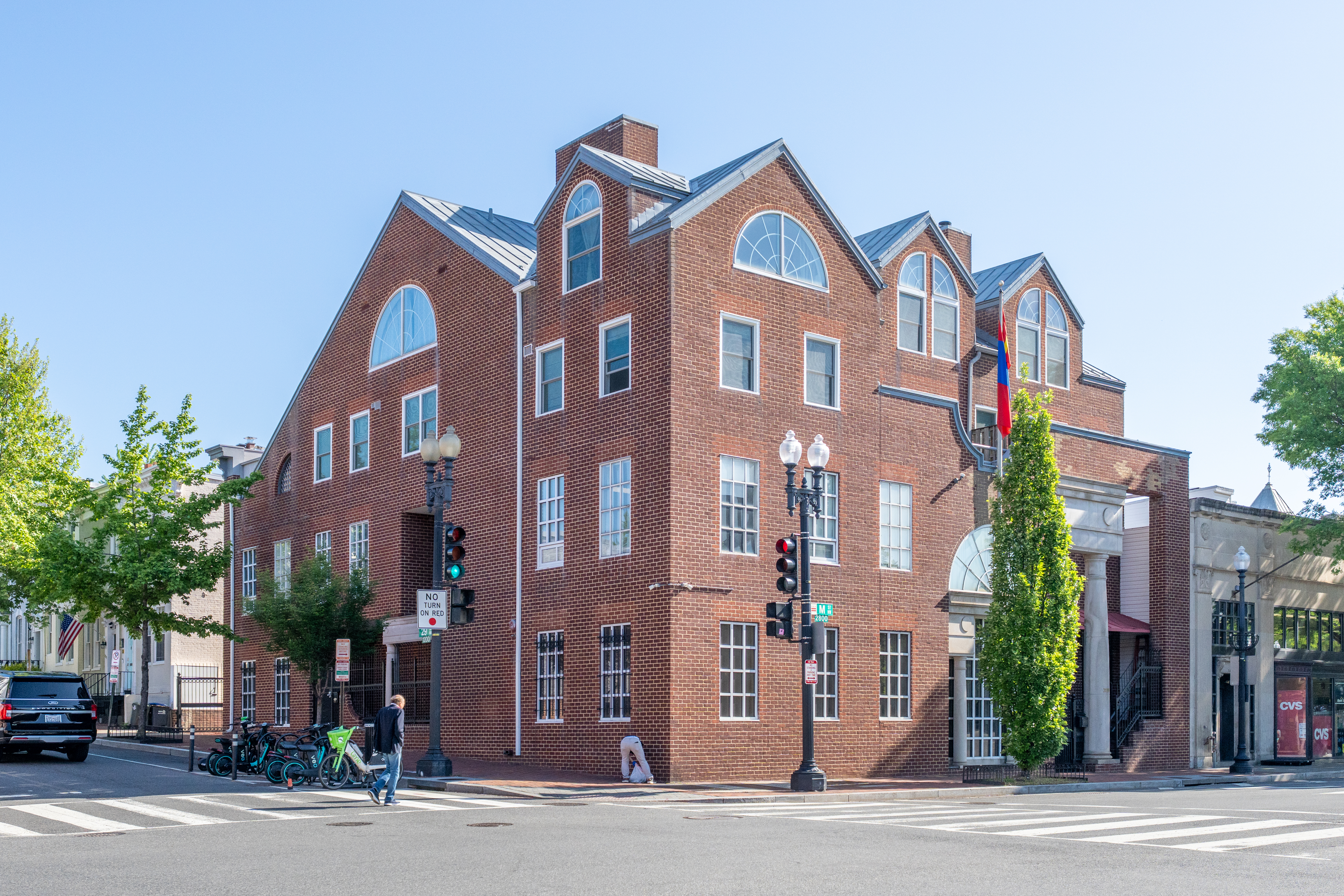
- Location: Washington, D.C.
- Address: 2833 M Street, N.W.
- Coordinates: 38°54′19.33″N 77°3′28.51″W

The Mongolian Embassy in Washington, D.C. is the diplomatic mission of Mongolia to the United States. It is located at 2833 M Street Northwest, Washington, D.C. in the Georgetown neighborhood.

Mongolia and the United States established diplomatic relations in 1987, and the embassy was opened in 1989.

The head of the Mongolian Embassy in Washington, D.C. is Ambassador Khasbazaryn Bekhbat.

In addition to the embassy in Washington, D.C., Mongolia maintains consulates in Chicago (officially opened in March 2022) and San Francisco.
