= Embassy of Mongolia, Moscow =

Diplomatic mission of Mongolia to Russia

Coordinates: 55.7546°N 37.5885°E

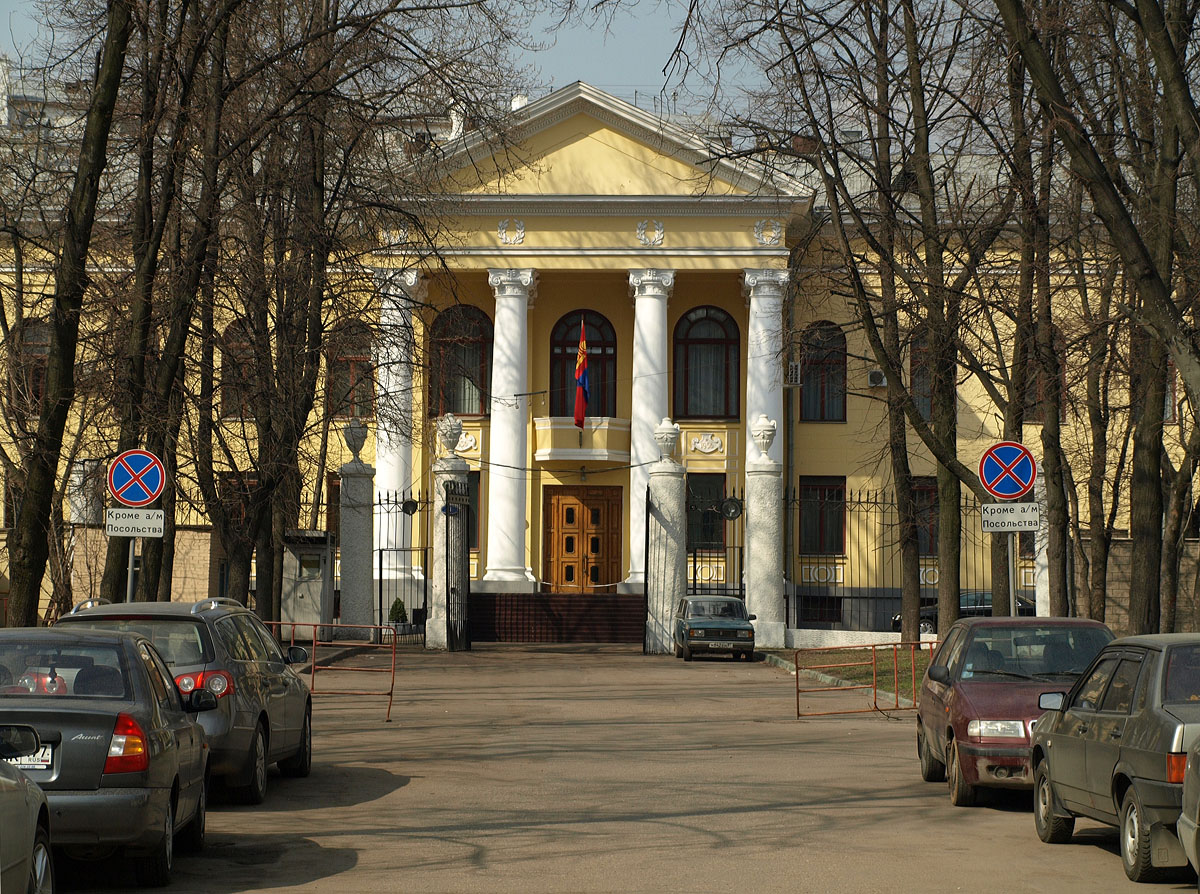
Embassy of Mongolia in Moscow

The Embassy of Mongolia in Moscow (Mongolian: Монгол улсаас ОХУ-д суугаа элчин сайдын жагсаалт; Russian: Посольство Монголии в России) is the chief diplomatic mission of Mongolia in the Russian Federation. It is located at 11 Borisoglebsky Lane (Russian: Борисоглебский пер., 11) in Moscow. The current ambassador is U.Enkhtuvshin, who presented his credentials in September 2022.

== See also ==
- Mongolia–Russia relations
- Diplomatic missions in Russia
