= Philippine Identification System Act =

Congress of the Philippines
- Long title: An Act Establishing the Philippine Identification System
- Citation: Republic Act No. 11055
- Territorial extent: Philippines
- Passed by: House of Representatives of the Philippines
- Passed: September 8, 2017
- Passed by: Senate of the Philippines
- Passed: March 19, 2018
- Signed by: President Rodrigo Duterte
- Signed: August 6, 2018

Legislative history

Initiating chamber: House of Representatives of the Philippines
- Bill title: An Act Establishing the Filipino Identification System
- Bill citation: House Bill No. 6221
- Introduced by: Congressman Feliciano Belmonte Jr. et al.
- Introduced: August 17, 2017
- First reading: August 22, 2017
- Second reading: August 30, 2017
- Third reading: September 8, 2017
- Committee report: Committee Report No. 360

Revising chamber: Senate of the Philippines
- Bill title: An Act Establishing the Philippine Identification System
- Bill citation: Senate Bill No. 1738
- Received from the House of Representatives of the Philippines: March 12, 2018
- Member(s) in charge: Senator Franklin Drilon, Panfilo Lacson et al.
- First reading: March 12, 2018
- Second reading: March 14, 2018
- Third reading: March 19, 2018
- Committee report: Committee Report No. 277
- Conference committee bill passed by House of Representatives of the Philippines: May 30, 2018
- Conference committee bill passed by Senate of the Philippines: May 29, 2018
- Status: In force

The Philippine Identification System Act, also known as the PhilSys Law and officially designated as Republic Act No. 11055, is a Philippine law that provides for the basis of for the Philippine government's national identity document system known as the Philippine Identification System (PhilSys).

== Legislative history ==
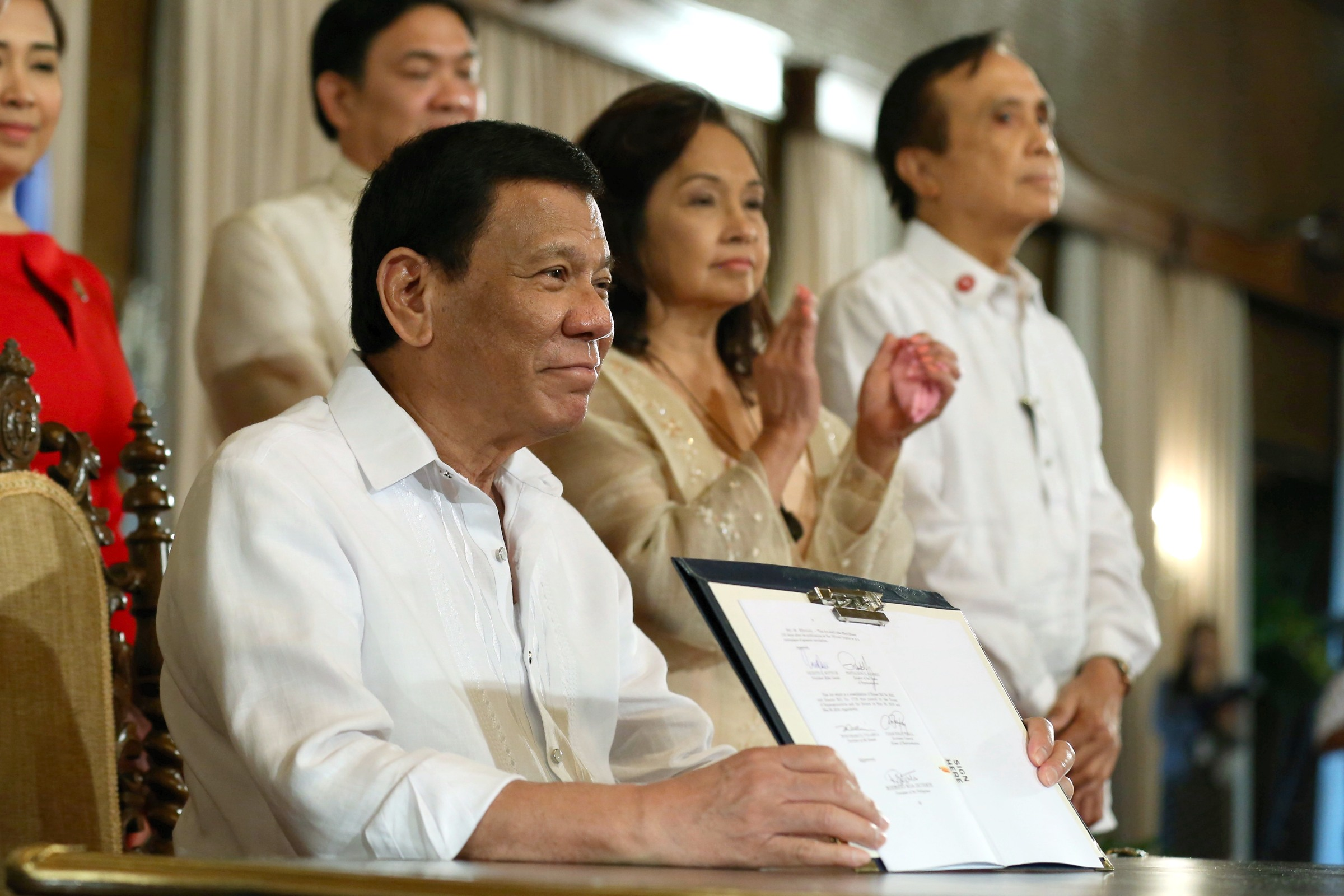
President Rodrigo Duterte shows a copy of the PhilSys Act after signing it during a ceremony at Malacañang Palace on August 6, 2018.

=== House Bill No. 6221 ===
House Bill No. 6221 was filed before the House of Representatives proposing the establishment of the Filipino Identification System or FilSys requiring Filipino citizens of at least 18 years old to obtain a FilSys ID. The information gathered for the proposed system will be restricted from law enforcement agencies except under certain circumstances. In the bill's third and final reading, 142 members of the lower legislature voted for the bill in the final reading while seven voted against.

=== Senate Bill No. 1738 ===
Senator Panfilo Lacson authored and sponsored Senate Bill No. 1738, or the Philippine Identification System (PhilSys) Act of 2018 which mandates a national identification system with compulsory registration. The PhilSys is meant to provide Filipino citizens and foreign residents in the Philippines a single and unified proof of identity to ease public and private transactions and deter criminality. The document from the national identification system will be called as the PhilSys ID which will bear a permanent identification number called the PhilSys number (PSN). The ID will contain the full name, facial image, birth date, address, and fingerprints of the bearer. However, possession of the ID card itself will not be compulsory. The Philippine Statistics Authority (PSA) will be the registry of the national identification system. Similar to the House of Representatives bill, the data from the national identification system will only be made available to third parties under certain circumstances.

The third and final reading of the bill was held on March 19, 2018, with Senators Francis Pangilinan and Risa Hontiveros voting against the measure.

=== Bicameral Conference Committee ===
The Bicameral Conference Committee has approved Lacson's bill with minor revisions in May 2018. The consolidated version was ratified by Senate on May 29 and the House of Representatives on the following day. The bill could then be signed into law by President Rodrigo Duterte.

=== Republic Act No. 11055 ===
On August 6, 2018, President Rodrigo Duterte signed into law the "Philippine Identification System Act" (R.A. 11055). Section 9 of the Act requires every Philippine citizen and resident alien to personally register with the Philippine ID system.

== Implementation ==
The Philippine Identification System (PhilSys) national identity card program was launched on August 24, 2018, although the implementing rules and regulations were approved on October 5, 2018, by the PhilSys Policy and Coordination Council.
