= Cartão Nacional de Identificação (Cape Verde) =

National identity card of Cape Verde

National Identity Card (Cartão Nacional de Identificação)
- Type: Compulsory Identity document
- Issued by: Cape Verde

The National Identity Card (Portuguese: Cartão Nacional de Identificação) or CNI is an identity card issued by the Cape Verdean government to its citizens. As defined by Decree-Law No. 19/2014 of March 17 and published at Boletim Oficial

== Appearance ==
The card is of similar size and appearance to a credit card. It contains a variety of information about the citizen.

== Information provided ==
The front of the card

- Surname(s)
- Given Name(s)
- Sex
- Height
- Nationality
- Date of birth
- Civil Identification Number
- Expiry Date
- Card holder's facial photo
- Card holder's Signature

The back of the card

- Filiation
- Machine-readable zone (MRZ) as Machine readable passport

On the chip

- Same data as previous defined (except facial photo)
- Facial photo in JPEG2000 format
- Two Digital finger print
- Digital certificates (card's authentication and electronic signature) 2048bits RSA
- And other information (the system is expandable)

=== Civil Identification Number ===
Each Civil Identification Number is a 13 digit number defined as YYYYMMDDSAAAC, which deciphers as follows:

Field	Description
YYYYMMDD	Date of birth: YYYY is four digit year, MM is two digit for month, DD is a two digit for day
S	Sex: F = Female, M = Male.
AAA	Sequential number: three digit (up to 999 people born on the same day for each sex)
C	Check digit used to validate the ID Number.

== See also ==
- List of national identity card policies by country
- Machine-readable passport
- Bilhete de Identidade de Portugal
- Portugal Citizen Card
