= Visa policy of Mongolia =

Policy on permits required to enter Mongolia

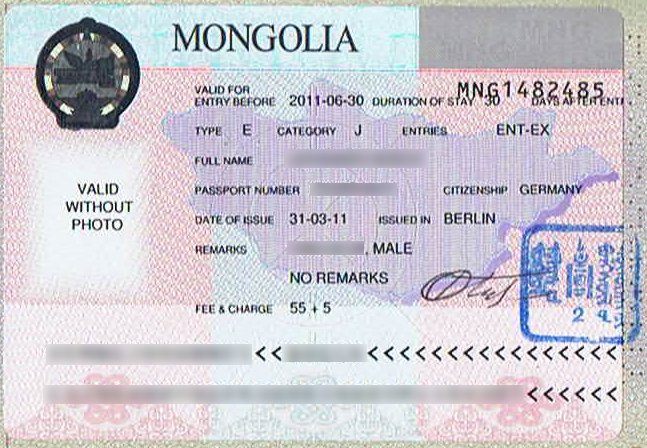
Mongolian visa sticker

Visitors to Mongolia must obtain a visa from one of the Mongolian diplomatic missions unless they are citizens of one of the visa-exempt countries, or citizens who may obtain a visa on arrival, or citizens eligible for an e-Visa.

All visitors must have a passport valid for at least 6 months from the date of arrival.

== Overview ==
Visitors from any country planning to stay in Mongolia for more than 30 days must register with the Mongolia Immigration Agency in Ulaanbaatar within the first seven days of arrival.

Visitors who fail to register and who stay longer than 30 days, even for reasons beyond their control, will be stopped at departure, temporarily denied exit, and fined. Until 1997, individual tourists wishing to visit Mongolia needed a letter of invitation from either a Mongolian citizen or a foreign resident before being granted a visa.

Since then the visa regime has been greatly liberalised with a resultant increase in tourism.

== Visa policy map ==
Visa policy of Mongolia Mongolia Visa not required (90 days) Visa not required with some condition (90 days) Visa not required (30 days) Visa not required (21 days) Visa not required (14 days) Visa on arrival (30 days) eVisa (30 days) Visa required

== Visa exemption ==
=== Ordinary passports ===
Citizens of the following countries and territories may enter Mongolia without a visa for the following period:

90 days

- Argentina
- Belarus
- Brazil
- Chile
- Colombia
- Ecuador
- Kazakhstan
- Kyrgyzstan
- Macau
- Paraguay
- Peru
- South Korea^{T1}
- United States

30 days

- All European Union member states^{T1}
- All European Free Trade Association member states^{T1}

- Australia^{T1}
- Canada
- Cuba
- Israel
- Japan
- Laos
- Malaysia
- Maldives
- Monaco^{T1}
- New Zealand^{T1}
- Russia^{1}
- Singapore
- Thailand
- Turkey
- United Arab Emirates
- United Kingdom^{T1}
- Uruguay
- Uzbekistan
- Vietnam

21 days

- Philippines

14 days

- Hong Kong

_{T1 - Temporary visa-free policy available until 1 January 2027 (German citizens are not restricted).}
_{1 - No more than 90 days within any 180-day period.}

- Ukraine
Citizens of Ukraine may enter Mongolia without a visa for up to 90 days if they have a document proving the purpose of their trip (tourist voucher or invitation letter).

=== Non-ordinary passports ===
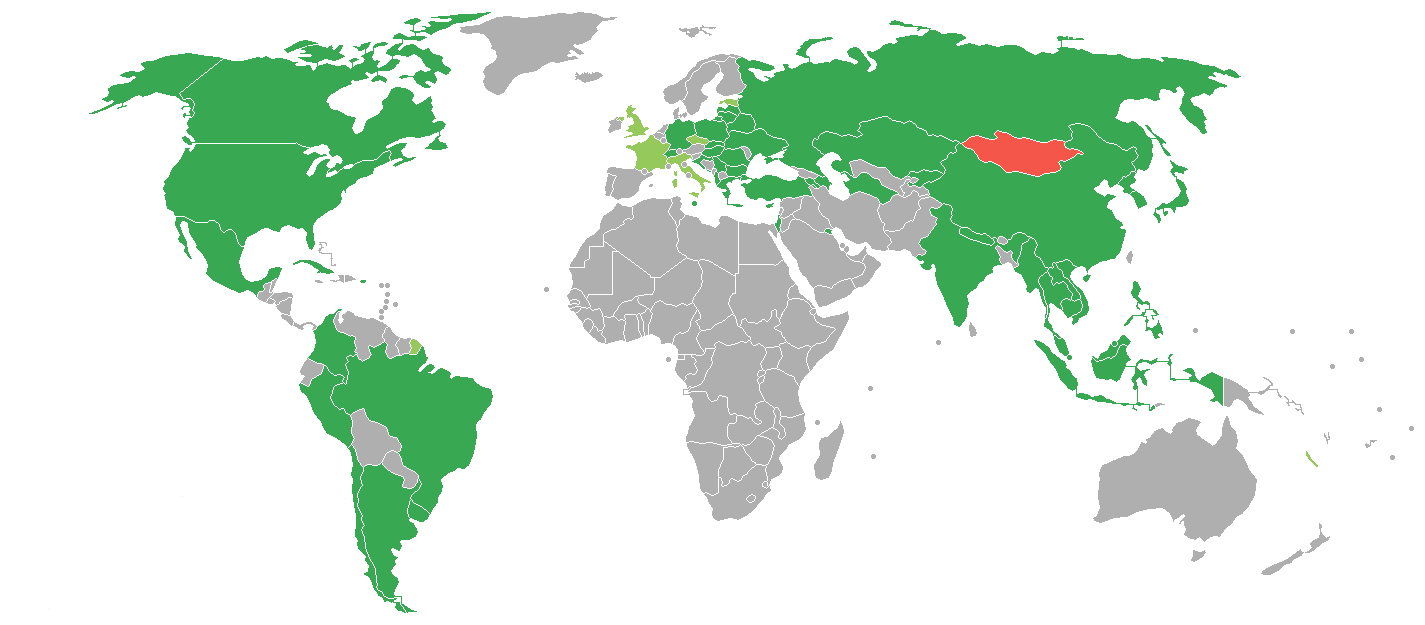
Mongolia Visa not required for diplomatic and service passports Visa not required for diplomatic passports

- Holders of diplomatic, official or service passports issued by ASEAN Member States (except Philippines), Albania, Argentina (90 days), Armenia, Azerbaijan, Belarus (90 days), Bulgaria, Chile, China, Colombia, Croatia, Cyprus, Ecuador (90 days), Germany, Greece, Hong Kong (14 days), Hungary, India, Kuwait, Latvia, Lithuania, Maldives, Malta, Macau (90 days), Mexico, Nepal, North Korea, Paraguay, Peru, Philippines (21 days), Poland, Romania, Saudi Arabia (90 days), Slovakia, South Korea (90 days), Switzerland, Turkey, Turkmenistan, United Arab Emirates and Ukraine (90 days) and holders of diplomatic passports of Czech Republic, Estonia, France, Italy and United Kingdom do not require a visa for a maximum stay of 30 days (unless otherwise stated).
- Holders of special passports issued by Maldives, Singapore and Turkey do not require a visa for a maximum stay of 30 days.
- Citizens of China holding a passport for public affairs do not require a visa for a maximum stay of 30 days.
- Holders of United Nations Laissez-Passer, officials of the United Nations Specialized Agencies and Interpol Travel Document travelling to Mongolia for purposes of tourism, business and residency do not require a visa for a maximum stay of 30 days.

Date of visa changes
- 14 October 1974: Romania (diplomatic and official passports)
- 14 November 1986: North Korea (diplomatic and official passports)
- 20 December 1979: Ukraine (signed as USSR)
- 30 March 1989: China (diplomatic and official passports)
- 9 March 1990: Singapore (Note: Supplanted by a new agreement on 8 June 2017)
- 23 October 1991: South Korea (diplomatic and official passports)
- 26 June 1992: Slovakia (diplomatic and official passports)
- 13 May 1994: Philippines
- 6 June 1994: Malaysia
- 2 January 1995: Kazakhstan
- 12 March 1996: Israel
- 18 June 1998: Hong Kong
- 4 December 1999: Kyrgyzstan
- 6 July 2001: United States
- 9 November 2001: Mexico
- 8 October 2001: Cuba
- 3 July 2004: Macao
- 23 December 2005: India (diplomatic and official passports)
- 14 October 2007: Laos
- 13 January 2008: Thailand
- 29 June 2009: United Kingdom (diplomatic passports)
- 1 April 2010: Japan
- 18 January 2011: Bulgaria (diplomatic and official passports)
- 29 July 2011: Czech Republic (diplomatic and service passports) (Note: Supplanted by a new agreement on 22 November 2023)
- 26 October 2011: Poland (diplomatic and official passports)
- 15 November 2011: Indonesia (diplomatic and official passports)
- 4 April 2012: Cyprus (diplomatic and official passports)
- 27 September 2012: Cambodia (diplomatic and official passports)
- 16 April 2013: Kuwait (diplomatic and special passports)
- 1 August 2013: Brunei (diplomatic and official passports)
- 1 September 2013: Germany
- 23 September 2013: Colombia (diplomatic and official passports)
- 26 October 2013: France (diplomatic passports)
- 8 November 2013: Serbia
- 17 December 2013: Myanmar (diplomatic and official passports)
- 1 January 2014: Canada
- 13 March 2014: Peru (diplomatic and official passports)
- 11 April 2014: Turkey
- 28 April 2014: Estonia (biometric diplomatic passports)
- 12 June 2014: Latvia (diplomatic and official passports)
- 5 July 2014: Belarus (Note: Under the Visa Agreement on 4 September 2013. Previous visa-free agreement under different terms was applied under the Visa Agreement between USSR and Mongolia on 20 December 1979)
- 14 July 2014: Italy (diplomatic passports)
- 14 November 2014: Russia (resumed under different terms)
- 3 June 2015: Turkmenistan (diplomatic and official passports)
- 21 September 2015: Brazil
- 18 May 2016: Hungary (diplomatic and official passports)
- 18 January 2017: Nepal (diplomatic, official and special passports)
- 30 March 2017: Albania (biometric diplomatic, official and service passports)
- 26 April 2017: Croatia (diplomatic and official passports)
- 8 February 2018: Malta (diplomatic and official passports)
- 19 February 2018: Argentina
- 29 April 2018: Lithuania (diplomatic and official passports)
- 10 June 2018: Uruguay
- 16 June 2018: Switzerland (diplomatic and official passports)
- 29 December 2018: Chile
- 7 February 2019: Azerbaijan (diplomatic, official and service passports)
- 2 June 2019: Armenia (diplomatic and official passports)
- 10 May 2020: Greece (diplomatic, official and service passports)
- 23 October 2020: Ecuador
- 1 May 2021: Slovenia (diplomatic, official and service passports)
- 1 October 2021: Peru
- 1 June 2022: South Korea (until 31 December 2026)
- 3 June 2022: Uzbekistan
- 4 January 2023: All European Union member states, Australia, Iceland, Liechtenstein, Monaco, New Zealand, Norway, Switzerland, United Kingdom (until 31 December 2026, except Germany)
- 12 January 2024: Maldives
- 17 January 2024: Paraguay
- 7 March 2024: Vietnam
- 14 May 2025: Oman (diplomatic, service and special passports)
- 26 January 2026: Colombia

Cancelled:

- 26 July 1992: Czechoslovakia (was resumed in 2014 as Czech Republic and Slovakia)
- 5 May 1995: Russia (was resumed in 2014)
- 1995: Armenia, Azerbaijan, Georgia, Kyrgyzstan (was resumed in 1999), Tajikistan, Turkmenistan and Uzbekistan (was resumed in 2022)
- 1 January 2016: Andorra, Argentina (was resumed in 2018), Austria, Bahamas, Belgium, Brazil, Bulgaria, Chile, Costa Rica, Croatia, Cyprus, Czech Republic, Denmark, Estonia, Finland, France, Gibraltar, Greece, Grenada, Hungary, Iceland, Ireland, Italy, Latvia, Liechtenstein, Lithuania, Luxembourg, Malta, Monaco, Netherlands, Norway, Panama, Poland, Portugal, Romania, Slovakia, Slovenia, Spain, Sweden, Switzerland, United Kingdom and Uruguay (was resumed in 2018)
- 13 March 2025: Serbia

=== Future changes ===
Mongolia has signed visa exemption agreements with the following countries, but they have, as yet, not entered into force:

| Country | Passports | Agreement signed on |
|---|---|---|
| Belgium | Diplomatic, official | 9 January 2024 |
| Luxembourg | Diplomatic, official | 9 January 2024 |
| Netherlands | Diplomatic, official | 9 January 2024 |
| Ukraine | Ordinary | 8 November 2019 |

== Visa on arrival ==
Citizens of following countries traveling as tourists may obtain a visa on arrival at Chinggis Khaan International Airport for a maximum stay of 30 days. They must have a completed visa application form, a passport photo (3.5 x 4.5 cm), a hotel / accommodation confirmation and a return / onward ticket.

- India
- Kuwait
- Qatar

== Electronic visa (e-Visa) ==
Mongolia Electronic Visa

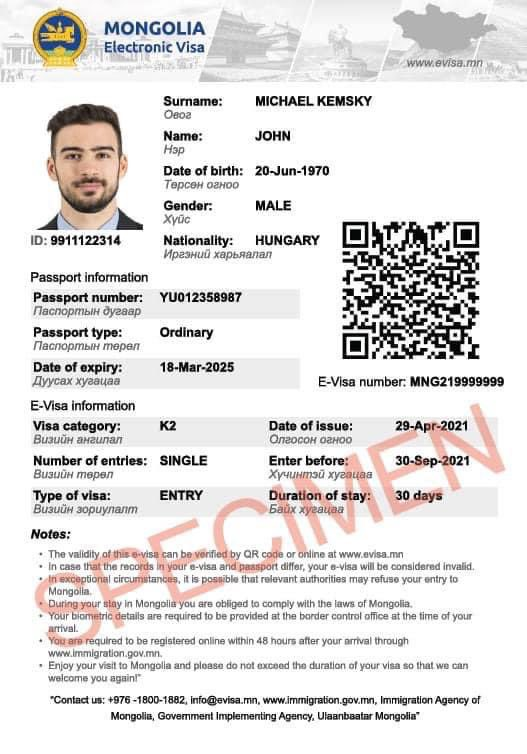
- Sample of Mongolian eVisa
- Owner: Immigration Agency of Mongolia
- Website: evisa.mn

The following countries and territories may obtain an e-Visa:

- Albania
- Andorra
- Angola
- Antigua and Barbuda
- Armenia
- Australia^{1}
- Bahamas
- Barbados
- Belize
- Benin
- Bhutan
- Bolivia
- Bosnia and Herzegovina
- Botswana
- Brunei
- Burundi
- Cambodia
- Cape Verde
- Central African Republic
- China
- Comoros
- Congo
- Costa Rica
- Cuba
- Democratic Republic of the Congo
- Djibouti
- Dominica
- El Salvador
- Equatorial Guinea
- Eritrea
- Eswatini
- Ethiopia
- Fiji
- Gabon
- Gambia
- Ghana
- Grenada
- Guatemala
- Guinea
- Guinea-Bissau
- Guyana
- Haiti
- Honduras
- India
- Indonesia
- Ivory Coast
- Jamaica
- Kenya
- Kiribati
- Kuwait
- Lesotho
- Madagascar
- Malawi
- Marshall Islands
- Mauritania
- Mauritius
- Mexico
- Micronesia
- Moldova
- Montenegro
- Mozambique
- Myanmar
- Namibia
- Nauru
- Nepal
- Nicaragua
- North Macedonia
- Palau
- Panama
- Papua New Guinea
- Paraguay
- Rwanda
- Saint Kitts and Nevis
- Saint Lucia
- Saint Vincent and the Grenadines
- Samoa
- San Marino
- São Tomé and Príncipe
- Saudi Arabia
- Senegal
- Seychelles
- Sierra Leone
- Solomon Islands
- South Africa
- South Korea^{2}
- South Sudan
- Suriname
- Taiwan
- Tanzania
- Timor-Leste
- Togo
- Tonga
- Trinidad and Tobago
- Tuvalu
- Uganda
- Vanuatu
- Vatican City
- Venezuela
- Vietnam
- Zambia
- Zimbabwe

_{1 - An e-Visa is required for work in Mongolia.}
_{2 - An e-Visa is required for sports or cultural events.}

e-Visa have been available since 1 October 2021, and applications will be processed in 3 working days and cost of e-visas varies based on the applicant passport.

| Visa type | Duration of stay | Validity | Number of entry | Visa fee |
|---|---|---|---|---|
| Tourism (K2) | 30 days | 150 days | Single | between 5.50 and 51.50 USD |
| Sports or cultural events (K4) | 30 days | 150 days | Single | between 5.50 and 51.50 USD |
| Transit (K6) | 10 days | 150 days | Single | between 2.75 and 25.75 USD |

== Visa requirements ==
Holders of confirmation of a pre-arranged visa may obtain a single entry visa on arrival at Chinggis Khaan International Airport, provided they are in possession of a completed visa application form and a passport photo, are arriving from a country without diplomatic representation of Mongolia, and have a sponsor in Mongolia who submits request to the Mongolian Immigration Authority.

== Visitor statistics ==
Most visitors arriving in Mongolia on short-term basis for tourism were from the following countries of nationality:

| Rank | Country | 2017 | 2016 | 2015 | 2014 | 2013 |
|---|---|---|---|---|---|---|
| 1 | China | 144,070 | 131,312 | 145,029 | 157,561 | 178,326 |
| 2 | Russia | 106,935 | 84,065 | 70,668 | 73,055 | 74,468 |
| 3 | South Korea | 74,985 | 57,587 | 47,213 | 45,476 | 45,178 |
| 4 | Japan | 22,582 | 19,985 | 19,277 | 18,282 | 18,178 |
| 5 | United States | 16,684 | 15,859 | 14,420 | 13,987 | 14,701 |
| 6 | Kazakhstan | 14,234 | 13,370 | 14,434 | 13,562 | 11,422 |
| 7 | Germany | 10,586 | 9,709 | 8,992 | 9,551 | 9,499 |
| 8 | France | 10,044 | 9,035 | 7,989 | 7,733 | 7,407 |
| 9 | Australia | 6,689 | 5,631 | 4,804 | 5,118 | 6,765 |
| 10 | United Kingdom | 6,012 | 6,161 | 6,148 | 5,758 | 6,391 |
| Other | | 58,273 | 51,442 | 47,230 | 42,761 | 45,480 |
| Total | | 471,094 | 404,156 | 386,204 | 392,844 | 417,815 |
Source: Ulaanbaatar Tourism Department

== See also ==
- Visa requirements for Mongolian citizens
