= List of national identity card policies by country =

Compulsory ID cards De-facto compulsory ID cards Non-compulsory ID cards ID cards do not exist (any more)

A national identity document is an identity card with a photo, usable as an identity card at least inside the country, and which is issued by an official national authority. Identity cards can be issued voluntarily or may be compulsory to possess as a resident or citizen.

Driving licences and other cards issued by state or regional governments indicating certain permissions are not counted here as national identity cards. So for example, by this criterion, the United States driver's license is excluded, as these are issued by local (state) governments.

== Identity card policies by country ==
Generally, most countries in the world issue identity cards, with fewer than 10 countries worldwide not issuing them, mostly confined to the anglosphere, microstates and unrecognised states. Many states issue voluntary identity cards to citizens as a convenience. As of 1996, identity cards were compulsory in over 100 countries. In these countries, the meaning of compulsory varies.

In the European Union, an EU/EEA national identity card can be used to travel freely within the EU/EEA in lieu of a passport. Similarly, in South America, citizens may use an identity card to travel between MERCOSUR states. In many other areas of the world, simplified travel arrangements are in place for neighbouring countries, allowing the use of identity cards for travel.

=== Countries with compulsory identity cards ===
The term "compulsory" may have different meanings and implications in different countries. Possession of a card may only become compulsory at a certain age. There may be a penalty for not carrying a card or identification such as a driving licence. In some cases a person may be detained until identity is proven. This facilitates police identification of fugitives. In some countries, police need a reason to ask for identification, such as suspicion of a crime or security risk, while in others, they can do so without stating a reason. Random checks are rare, except in police states. Normally there is an age limit, such as 18, after which possession is mandatory, even if minors aged 15–17 may need a card in order to prove that they are under 18.

Country	Name	Description
Abkhazia	Аҧсны Атәылауаҩшәҟәы (Abkhaz Internal Passport)	The Abkhaz passport is issued to citizens of the Republic of Abkhazia for the purpose of international travel and for the purpose of legal identification within Abkhazia (internal and international passports are combined, similar to other post-Soviet countries). As Abkhazia is only recognised by Russia, Venezuela, Syria, Nicaragua and Nauru, for all other destinations Abkhazian citizens must use another passport (most of them use Russian passports) for international travel.
Afghanistan	Tazkira (National Identity Document)	The Tazkira includes a certificate of citizenship and an electronic ID card, which contain a 13-digit national identification number. Both of these documents are issued by the National Statistics and Information Authority to a citizen of Afghanistan. The 13-digit national identification number also appears in an Afghan passport, which is issued by the General Directorate of Passports.
Albania	Letërnjoftimi (Albanian Identity Card)	The Letërnjoftimi is an electronic biometric ID card, compulsory upon 16 years old and costs 1,200 lekë (€10).
Algeria	بطاقة التعريف الوطنية / Carte nationale d’identité (Algerian National Identity card)	The Algerian national identity card is an electronic biometric ID card, compulsory for all Algerian nationals and costs 2,500 Algerian Dinar.
Angola	Bilhete de identidade de cidadão nacional (national citizen identity card)	The Angolan national identity is compulsory. It contains the person's name, date of birth, date and place of issue, validity, filiation, photo, marital status, fingerprint of the citizen's right indicator, a signature and address. Nevertheless, more than 12 million Angolans do not possess a national identity card.
Antigua and Barbuda	Electoral National Identification card	The Antiguan and Barbudan national identity card is compulsory for voting as well as for different government transactions.
Argentina	Documento Nacional de Identidad (DNI) (National Identity Card)	The Documento Nacional de Identidad (DNI) is issued at a person's birth, and updated at 8 and 14 years of age, and thereafter renewed every fifteen years. For many years, the DNI was issued as a small booklet (libreta). In 2009, the DNI was revamped and digitalized; and booklets were issued along with a card (tarjeta) simultaneously. Since 2012, DNIs are issued only in card format, and starting in 2015, it was announced that they should have a chip with information of the holder and NFC payment. However, this wasn't done until 2023, when there was a new ID with a chip inside for both citizens as well foreigners. The new DNI card is required to obtain a new Argentine passport and there are penalties if they aren't renewed in time.
Azerbaijan	Şəxsiyyət vəsiqəsi (Azerbaijan Identity Card)	The Şəxsiyyət vəsiqəsi is an ID card, compulsory upon 16 years old and costs 5 manats (around €2.50). It is not compulsory to carry it at all time.
Bahrain	Central Popular Registration (CPR)	Central Population Register (CPR) is a nine digit (all numeric) identification number which is also called as personal number issued for all the residents living in Bahrain. In order to use basic or any services, carry out financial transactions one must have CPR.
Bangladesh	National Identity Card (NID-Card) জাতীয় পরিচয়পত্র	"National Identity" (NID) card is a compulsory electronic biometric identification for all citizens at the age of 18 and above. All Bangladeshis are issued with an NID Card which is required to obtain a passport, driving licence, or credit card, and to register land ownership, SIM Card, various allowance provided through Social Welfare Division of Bangladeshi Government etc. Moreover, Each citizen of Bangladesh is directed to have "Birth Registration Certificate" (BRC) immediately after birth. BRC is mandatory for obtaining NID and usually protect the identity of minors who are not eligible for NID due to age restriction.
Belarus	Нацыянальная ідэнтыфікацыйная карта (Belarus national identity card (since 2021))	Belarus did until 2021 combine the international Belarusian passport and the internal passport into one document. Issued passports are valid until its 10 year expiry. the old passport follows the international passport convention but has extra pages for domestic use. New biometric identity cards and new biometric passports were rolled out in 2021. The Belarusian passport or identity cards is compulsory at 14. Could be issued before 14 for travelling purposes.
Belgium	Identiteitskaart / Carte d’Identité / Personalausweis (Identity Card)	The card is first issued at age 12, compulsory by 15. Since the beginning of 2005 the eID (electronic IDentity card) has been issued to Belgian citizens who apply for a new identity card. Apart from being a form of identification, the card also is used for authentication purposes. Future usages include using the eID as a library card, keycard for restricted areas or chatrooms and the digital signing of documents. It is expected that in 2009 all Belgians will have an eID card. They have to be carried at all times.
Benin	Carte nationale d'identité (National identity card)	Compulsory. Biometric since 2016.
Bhutan	Bhutan citizenship card	The Bhutanese national identity card is an electronic ID card, compulsory for all Bhutanese nationals and costs 100 Bhutanese ngultrum.
Bolivia	Cédula de identidad (Identity Card)	Compulsory at 18, but rarely demanded by police.
Bosnia and Herzegovina	Lična Karta / Osobna iskaznica (Identity Card)	At the age of 16 in Bosnia and Herzegovina, one can obtain an ID card, but it does not grant any legal authority until turning 18 and then becomes mandatory and is to be carried at all times after turning 18.
Botswana	Omang (National Identity Card)	It is compulsory for all citizens at age 16, and there are penalties for not obtaining it within one month of turning 16 or obtaining citizenship, whichever comes last. Includes the image of the individual (no headgear or eyewear), their particulars, and their right thumbprint. Valid for 10 years, whereupon it must be renewed and a new photograph taken. Must be presented upon request by any agent of the state, and the state requires all non-state institutions to use the national ID card as the only acceptable means of identification for citizens – passports and driver's licences should not be used, even though they contain most of the information on the ID card, including the ID card number. There are penalties for being issued a replacement card when it has been lost, however, if it is changed to update information on it only the application fee must be paid (e.g., upon expiry, and legal name changes as when a woman gets married and assumes her husband's surname). Every time a new one is issued for whatever reason, a new photograph must be taken. The individual keeps their national ID card number for life, and in recent years it has been linked to the birth certificate number of newborn infants (it is the same number). The national ID card must be surrendered to the government upon the demise of the individual, at which time it will be exchanged for an official death certificate.
Brazil	Brazil Identity Card (Identity Card)	Compulsory to be issued since the age of 18 (though it can be substituted by a series of equivalent documents, see below). It is usually issued, for civilians, by the secretariat of public security of each unit of the federation, but other – including the Armed Forces, the Police and some professional councils – can issue alternate identity cards, too. All must meet certain specifications – they are all coloured green – but each unit of the federation can include minor differences such as the numbering scheme, font, printed seal, and background pattern. The card's front has the bearer's picture (with an electronic stamp on it) and right thumb print. It also includes either the bearer's signature or – if the bearer is illiterate – the phrase "cannot sign" (não assina) The verso has the unique number assigned the bearer (registro geral or RG), the bearer's full name, filiation, birthplace (locality and federation unit), birth date, and CPF number. It may include some additional information. It is officially 102 × 68 mm, but lamination tends to make it slightly larger than the ISO/IEC 7810 ID-2 standard of 105 × 74 mm, so it is a tight fit in most wallets. A driver's licence has only recently been given the same legal status as the national identity card. In most situations, only a few other documents can be substituted for a national identity card: for example, identification documents issued by national councils of professionals.
Brunei	Kad Pengenalan (National Identity Card)	Compulsory for all citizens at the age of 12.
Bulgaria	Лична карта (Identity Card)	First issued and is compulsory after turning the age of 14. The new Bulgarian ID cards were introduced in 1999. They follow the general pattern in the EU and replaced the old, Soviet-style "internal passports", also known as "green passports". Since 2007, the Bulgarian identity card can be used to travel within the European Union.
Burkina Faso	Carte d'Identité Nationale Burkinabè (CNIB) [Burkinabé National Identity Card]	National Identity Card compulsory at the age of 15 and valid for 10 years.
Burundi	Carte Nationale d'Identité (CNI) [National Identity Card]	National Identity Card compulsory. Valid for international travel within the East African Community. A new biometric card is set to be ready for 2025.
Cambodia	Khmer Identity Card	Compulsory and biometric since 2011.
Cameroon	Carte nationale d'identité / national identity card	Optional, although compulsory for voting, acquisition of both passports and driving licenses and for certain government transactions.
Cape Verde	Cartão Nacional de Identificação (CNI) [National Identity Card]	The Cape Verdian national identity card (referred as "Citizen card") is an electronic biometric ID card, compulsory for all Cape Verdian nationals. The card format is identical to the Portuguese Citizen card, with information displayed in Portuguese, English and French and is made by the same company, also in Portugal. New biometric identity cards are being issued since 2018, replacing the format paper (similar to the old Portuguese identity card) which was issued since 1957.
Central African Republic	Carte nationale d'identité (National identity card)	Compulsory.
Chad	Carte nationale d'identité (National Identity Card)	Compulsory with a price of 10.000 CFA.
Chile	Cédula de identidad (Identity card)	Normally this is first issued at age 2 or 3, but it can be issued whenever the legal ascendant(s) request its issue. It is compulsory at 18, when it has to be carried at all times.
China	Resident Identity Card (居民身份证 / Jūmín Shēnfèn Zhèng)	Normally this is first issued at school age, but it can be issued whenever the legal ascendant(s) request its issue.
Colombia	Documento de Identidad / Cédula de Ciudadanía (Identity document)	Registro Civil de Nacimiento (Birth record) issued when the legal ascendant(s) register the newborn. Tarjeta de identidad is issued aged 7. From 26 June 2013, is available the new format (coloured sky blue) with biometric features. The previous format (coloured pink) is still valid until the minor reaches 14, when he or she has to request the new sky blue format. Cédula de Ciudadanía is compulsory at the age of 18, and from 31 July 2010, the only valid format is the yellow one. It has to be carried at all times and must be presented to police or the military upon their request. As of 2020, a new Electronic Identity Document is being issued which must be renewed every 10 years. This new document is available both physically, as a card, and electronically, through a mobile application
Comoros	Carte nationale d’identité (Comoros national identity card)	The Comorian national identity card is an ID card, compulsory for all Comorian nationals. Biometric since January 2018.
Congo, Republic of the	Carte nationale d'identité (national identity card)	Compulsory at the age of 18.
Costa Rica	Cédula de identidad (Identity Card)	Every citizen immediately must carry an ID card after turning 18.
Croatia	Osobna iskaznica (Personal card)	The Croatian identity card is compulsory for citizens of Croatia who have a permanent residence in Croatia and are at least 18 years old. By law, it must be carried at all times.
Cuba	Carnet de identidad (Identity card)	Compulsory for anyone 16 and older and must be carried at all times. It is routinely used for identification and is often necessary to conduct public and private business.
Cyprus	Greek: Δελτίο Ταυτότητας; Turkish: Kimlik Kartı (Identity card)	Compulsory at 12.
Czech Republic	Občanský průkaz (Civil card)	Compulsory at 15 for those with a permanent stay registered in the country.
Djibouti	Carte nationale d'identité/ بطاقة الهوية الوطنية (national identity card)	Compulsory for all Djiboutians. Electronic since 2014.
Dominican Republic	Cédula de Identidad y Electoral (CIE)(Personality Verification Card)	If needed, an underage ID card may be obtained at the age of 16, yet the official ID (which will allow the individual to vote) is obtained at 18.
East Timor	Bilhete de Identidade (Identity Card)	Compulsory for all East Timorese citizens. Issued since 2018, with EU and Portuguese funds.
Ecuador	Cédula de Identidad (National identity card)	Every citizen over 18 years must have a national identity card. The renewal of the card is $10.00.
Egypt	بطاقة تحقيق الشخصية (Personality Verification Card)	The Personality Verification Card is compulsory at the age of 15. Issued by the Civil Registry Office which is subordinate to the Ministry of Interior. Not carrying the ID card is only penalised by fine not exceeding £E200.
El Salvador	Documento Único de Identidad (Unique Identity Document)	Every citizen 18 years or older must carry this ID card.
Equatorial Guinea	Documento de Identidad Personal (Personal Identity Document)	Compulsory to all citizens.
Eritrea	ሃገራዊ ናይ መንነት ወረቀት (National identity card)	Compulsory for all Eritrean citizens. New version rolled out in 2014.
Estonia	Isikutunnistus (Identity card)	Compulsory by law, but there is no penalty for not having one. Many electronic services are available (legally binding digital signatures, internet banking, internet voting, strong authentication to government and private websites). Citizens carrying ID cards are not required to carry drivers licence and registration.
Eswatini	National ID card	Compulsory for all citizens of the Kingdom of Eswatini.
Gabon	Carte Nationale d'identité (National Identity card)	Compulsory.
Gambia	Gambian National Identity Card	All Gambian citizens 18 years or older are required to hold a Gambian National ID Card.
Georgia (country)	ეროვნული პირადობის მოწმობა (National Identity Card)	Compulsory for Georgian citizens after turning 14 (within 6 months). Valid for international travel to Armenia, Turkey, and Ukraine
Germany	Personalausweis (identity card / carte d'identité)	A German identity card is compulsory to possess but not carry for all German citizens aged 16 or older; a passport can also be used in lieu of an identity card. While police officers and some other officials have a right to demand to see one of those documents, the law does not state that one is obliged to submit the document immediately. Fines may only be applied if an identity card or passport is not possessed at all, if the document is expired or if one explicitly refuses to show ID to the police. If one is unable to produce an ID card or passport (or any other form of credible identification) during a police control, one can (in theory) be brought to the next police post and detained for a maximum of 12 hours, or until positive identification is possible. However, this measure is only applied if the police have reasonable grounds to believe the person detained has committed an offence.
Ghana	Ghana Card	Compulsory for Ghanaian citizens above 16.
Greece	Greek identity card	In Greece, the biggest change in the Identity Documents Law happened in 2000, when some fields of the Police Identity Card (as Greeks call it) were rejected. These fields included religion, addresses, biometric characteristics and a fingerprint. Conversely, some fields were added: Latin transliterations of name and surname and blood type of the owner. Under this law, all Greeks over 12 years old must have an Identity Card issued. In Greece, many everyday activities require proof of identity, and the Greek national identity card issued by the Hellenic Police is the primary official identity document for citizens. By law, all Greek citizens aged 12 and over must obtain an ID card, and while carrying identification at all times is not explicitly compulsory de jure, citizens are required to be able to prove their identity upon police request; if they cannot, they may be taken to a police station for verification, making the practice de facto compulsory. Greek ID cards can be used for travel within the EU and the Schengen Area in place of a passport, but older-style cards without modern security features or machine-readable zones may cause delays at border controls and will cease to be valid for EU travel by August 2026, as Greece transitions to new, EU-compliant identity cards.
Guatemala	Documento Personal de Identificación (National Identity Document)	Identity cards are issued to any Guatemalan and legal residents. For children between 0 and 12 years the document is golden shaded; between 13 and 17 years the document is silvered. Documents for Guatemalan citizens are blue and for legal residents are red. The Guatemalan constitution requires personal identification via documentation, person rooting or the government. If the person cannot be identified, they may be sent to a judge until identification is provided.
Guinea	Carte nationale d'identité (National identity card)	Compulsory with a price of 100.000/150.000 CFA.
Guinea-Bissau	Bilhete de identidade CEDEAO (CEDEAO national identity card)	Biometric since 2018, with a price of 10,000 CFA.
Guyana	Guyana national identity card	The Guyanese national identity card is an electronic ID card, compulsory for all Guyanese nationals. New biometric cards ready to be rolled out in 2026.
Haiti	Kat idantifikasyon nasyonal / Carte d'identification nationale (National identification card)	The Haitian national identity card is an electronic ID card, compulsory for all Haitian nationals at the age of 18.
Honduras	Cédula de identidad (national identity card)	The Honduran national identity card is an electronic ID card, compulsory for all Honduran nationals at the age of 18.
Hong Kong	Hong Kong Identity Card (HKID)	Identity cards have been used since 1949, and been compulsory since 1980. Children are required to obtain their first identity card at age 11, and must change to an adult identity card at age 18. Police officers have an absolute right to require every person aged 15 or above on public premises to produce their HKID or valid passport for inspection; failure to produce such photo ID constitutes an offence in law. The reason for setting up police random checks is due to the end of the Touch Base Policy on 24 October 1980, which meant that all illegal immigrants from China that failed to present a valid Hong Kong Identity Card at random checks would subsequently be sent back to Mainland China.
Hungary	Személyi igazolvány	See (in Hungarian) It is compulsory to possess an Személyi igazolvány (Identity card) or passport from the age of 14. A driving license can be also used for identification from the age of 17. Private entities however, are legally required to accept passport or driver's licence for proof, but often do not accept them, only the ID card, thus in effect almost all citizens have the ID card. Police has the legal power to stop people on streets at random and ask for ID card. If the person has no proof for identification one can be detained for maximum 24 hours.
Indonesia	Kartu Tanda Penduduk – KTP (Resident Identification Card)	The card is issued to Indonesian citizens and foreign nationals with permanent residence in the Republic of Indonesia. Possession of KTP is compulsory for residents whose age is 17 or older, and residents who is married before the age of 17. The electronic version (e-KTP) is valid indefinitely, unless the data recorded on the card has changed (e.g. address, marital status, etc.).
Iran	کارت شناسائی ملی (National Identity card)	The Iranian national identity card is compulsory for citizens and permanent residents, aged 15 and over.
Iraq	Iraq National Card البطاقة الوطنية (Arabic) كارتى نيشتيمانى (Kurdish)	The National Card is an electronic biometric ID card, compulsory for all Iraqi citizens starting in 2016 and costs 5,000 dinars.
Israel	Teudat Zehut תעודת זהות (Hebrew) بطاقة هوية (Arabic)	The Teudat Zehut is first issued at age 16 and is compulsory by 18.
Ivory Coast	Carte Nationale d'Identité (CNI) National Identity Card	Compulsory at the age of 15.
Jordan	بطاقة شخصية (Personal card)	First issued at age 16 and is compulsory by 18.
Kazakhstan	Jeke kuälık (Identity card)	The identity cards have been issued since 1994 and compulsory for all citizens at age 16. Biometric since 2009.
Kenya	Kitambulisho	All citizens (and permanent residents) are issued a national identification card at age 18. As at November 2023, IDs in Kenya cost about 2,000 shillings (approx. $13.20). ID cards are the most common forms of identification, although passports can also be used interchangeably in most instances. As of Autumn 2019 there is a new National Integrated Identity Management System (NIIMS) – better known as Huduma Namba, which has caused controversy.
Kiribati	Identity card	Mandatory national identity card was decided in Kiribati in 2018 and introduced soon after. Age limit is 18.
Kosovo	Letërnjoftim / Лична карта (National identity card)	Biometric national ID cards compulsory to all Kosovar citizens.
Kuwait	بطاقة المدني (Kuwaiti identity card)	All residents of Kuwait must have a Civil ID card. The legal ascendant(s) of newborns should apply for registration of the child within 60 days after birth. An expatriate must apply for a civil ID card within 30 days of obtaining residency.
Kyrgyzstan	Инсандык карта (National identity card)	Compulsory at 16. Biometric since 2018.
Laos	ບັດປະຈຳຕົວ (identity card)	There is a compulsory identity document issued in Laos. The document is issued by the police on behalf of the Ministry of Home Affairs and is the main form of identification on the territory of the Lao P.D.R. All Laotian are obliged by law to carry their identity cards with them at all times and are subject to fines should they not, all Laotian nationals must hold the new magnetic Identification Card. Biometric. Distribution of national ID cards started in 2015 and the card is compulsory for all national citizens aged 16 and above.
Lebanon	بطاقة هوية Lebanese identity card	There is a compulsory identity document issued in Lebanon. The document is issued by the police on behalf of the Ministry of Interior and is the main form of identification on the territory of the Republic of Lebanon. All Lebanese are obliged by law to carry their identity cards with them at all times and are subject to fines should they not. As of 30 June 2006, all Lebanese nationals must hold the new magnetic Identification Card.
Lesotho	National ID card	Compulsory for all national citizens. ID cards were implemented in 2013.
Liberia	National identification card	New biometric national identity card have been rolled out in the late 2017.
Luxembourg	Carte nationale d'identité / Personalausweis / National Identitéitskaart (National identity card)	First issued at age 15 and only issued to Luxembourg citizens, who are required by law to carry it at all times.
Macau	Bilhete de Identidade de Residente (Resident Identity Card)	It is compulsory for all Macau residents at the age of 5.
Madagascar	Kara-panondrom-pirenena / Carte nationale d'identité de citoyen malagasy	Possession is compulsory for Malagasy citizens from age 18 (by decree 78–277 (3 Oct 1978)).
Malawi	National Identification card (Chipaso cha Nzika)	Biometric. Distribution of national ID cards started in 2017 and the card is compulsory for all national citizens aged 16 and above.
Malaysia	MyKad	Issued at age 12, and updated at 18. MyPR for Permanent Resident. MyKas for temporary residents. Non-compulsory MyKid before age of 12. MyKad and MyPR must be carried at all times. Cards are differentiated by colour. MyKad is blue, MyPr is red and MyKas is green.
Maldives	ދިވެހި ރައްޔިތެއްކަން އަންގައިދޭ ކާޑު / National Identity Card	The card is compulsory to access the national health insurance scheme, Aasandha, acquire passports and driver's licenses, open bank accounts, etc.
Mali	Carte nationale d'identité NINA (NINA National identity card)	Compulsory to all Malian citizens.
Malta	Karta tal-Identità / Identity card	Issued at 14, updated at 16, compulsory at 18.
Mauritania	بطاقة الهوية الوطنية / Carte nationale d’identité (National Identity card)	Compulsory at 15. Biometric since 2013, with information displayed in Arabic, French and English
Mauritius	National Identity Card	Every Mauritian citizen who has reached 18 years old has to apply for a National ID card, which is one of the few accepted forms of identification, including a passport.
Moldova	Buletin de identitate (Identity card)	Compulsory at 16.
Monaco	Monégasque identity card	Compulsory for all Monégasque citizens.
Mongolia	Citizen Identity Card of Mongolia	The national identity card is compulsory for all Mongolian citizens above the age of 16. Electronic since 2012, with informations displayed both in Mongolian and English.
Montenegro	Lična karta (Лична карта, Identity card)	Compulsory at the age of 16, but can be issued at 14 and has to be carried at all times after turning 18. It is issued only to Montenegrin citizens with permanent residence in Montenegro. While it is the most often used official identification document, three other hold the same status — Passport, Driver's licence and Refugee ID card. Old style IDs, that refer to the no longer existing states of SFR Yugoslavia or FR Yugoslavia, are not valid since 2011.
Morocco	البطاقة الوطنية للتعريف الإلكترونية / Carte nationale d'identité électronique (CNIE) / National electronic identity card	The national electronic identity card is the ID of the citizens of Morocco (in Arabic : البطاقة الوطنية للتعريف الإلكترونية). This is an official document which allows any citizen to prove his identity and therefore it is valid, his Moroccan nationality. It is compulsory for all citizens aged over 16 years, but it can be obtained at all ages. The 2008 version of the card is the first to have the form of a credit card. The replacement of the 2008 version for the new 2020 version is not compulsory. The Directorate General of National Security of Morocco announced it will issue a newer version of the national electronic identity card (NEIC) from 2020. The NEIC is biometric and provides citizens of a birth certificate, residence certificate, extract of birth and citizenship certificates.
Mozambique	Bilhete de identidade (Identity card)	N/A
Myanmar	Citizenship Scrutiny Card	Myanmar citizens are required to have a Citizenship Scrutiny Card.
Namibia	National ID card	Compulsory for all Namibia citizens. New identity cards replaced previous “SWA” IDs in 2016.
Nepal	राष्ट्रिय परिचयपत्र पत्र National Identity Card	New biometric cards rolled out in 2018. Information displayed in both English and Nepali.
Nicaragua	Cédula de identidad (National identity card)	Compulsory at the age of 16 and onwards. New biometric national ID cards are set be launch in 2026.
Niger	Carte nationale d'identité (National identity card)	Compulsory.
Nigeria	National identity card	Compulsory. Electronic since 2013.
Northern Cyprus	Kimlik Kartı (Identity card)	Northern Cypriot identity card are issued by the government of the de facto state of Northern Cyprus for the purpose of identification. It can be used as a travel document to enter Turkey and the Republic Cyprus (only at the land border with North Cyprus).
North Korea	National identity card.	"Identity Card", "Travel Pass" (with specified destination of travel and written permission) North Korea is probably the country which imposes the strongest fines for citizens not carrying ID cards. For travel, North Koreans need both an identity card, and a "travel pass", with specified destination and written permission. Sometimes citizens may be punished with time in a labour camp for not carrying their cards, however this is often only a short sentence and people are usually released upon presentation of the card at a later date. Although much is not known about the properties of the card, it is probably plastic and similar in size to most European ID cards. Between 2004 and 2008, all records were transferred to an electronic Korean-language central database. Obtaining a driving license in North Korea is not usual – except in the case of professional drivers, mechanics, and assistants – since few citizens own cars. Only government officials are issued passports because the state restricts citizens travel. North Koreans working abroad are issued contracts between North Korea and the host country to allow for travel, and government officers often accompany and supervise workers.
North Macedonia	Лична карта (Identity card)	Issued by the ministry of interior to citizens with permanent residence in North Macedonia. It is compulsory at the age of 18.
Oman	بطاقة الهوية الوطنية (Identity Card)	Compulsory for male citizens turning 15, optional for females. Biometric since 2014 with information displayed in both Arabic and English.
Pakistan	Computerised National Identity Card (CNIC) and Juvenile Card	Computerized National Identity Card (CNIC) and SNIC issued by National Database and Registration Authority (NADRA). The CNIC with a unique 13 digit identification number can be applied for aged 18 and above. For children under 18, NADRA provides Juvenile Card (previously known as Smart National Identity Card 'SNIC') but it is not valid for voting or polling . CNIC complies with ICAO standard 9303 and ISO standard 7816-4 and has English and Urdu translations, an integrated chip, QR code for more personal data, and more security features. The CNIC is not compulsory to carry all the time. But the card is mandatory for voting, domestic flights, opening bank accounts, for passport, driving license, firearms license and almost all substantial monetary transactions from car, land to high-value assets and to enter sensitive areas in country (courts, military controlled areas, airports police stations and private residences). However, law enforcement agencies can ask for CNIC during routine checking or after traffic violations.
Palestine	بطاقة هوية (Identity card)	Identification Card. First made on the age of 16, The fields in it are identical to those in ID cards issued by Israeli Civil Administration prior to the Oslo accords, fields include Full name (four names), Mother name, date of birth, birthplace, Gender, Religion, place of issuance, and issue date. in addition to an appendix that includes address, marital status, name and ID number of and listing of partner, and previous name(s), in addition to a listing of children names. The document "validity" is incubated until the Israeli authorities approve it.
Panama	Cedula de Identidad (National identity card)	Cedula de Identidad. Required at 12 (cedula juvenil) and 18 years of age. Panamanian citizens must carry their Cedula at all times. New biometric national identity cards rolling out in 2019. The card must be renewed every 10 years (every 5 years for those under 18) and it can only be replaced 3 times (with each replacement costing more than the previous one) without requiring a background check, to confirm and verify that the card holder is not selling his or her identity to third parties for human trafficking or other criminal activities. All cards have QR, PDF417, and Code 128 barcodes. The QR Code holds all printed (on the front of the card) text information about the card holder, while the PDF417 barcode holds, in JPEG format encoded with Base64, an image of the fingerprint of the left index finger of the card holder. Panamanian biometric/electronic/machine readable ID cards are similar to biometric passports and current European/Czech national ID cards and have only a small PDF417 barcode, with a machine readable area, a contactless smart card RFID chip and golden contact pads similar to those found in smart card credit cards and SIM cards. The machine readable code contains all printed text information about the card holder (it replaces the QR Code) while both chips (the smart card chip is hidden under the golden contact pads) contain all personal information about the card holder along with a JPEG photo of the card holder, a JPEG photo with the card holder's signature, and another JPEG photo but with all 10 fingerprints of both hands of the card holder. Earlier cards used Code 16K and Code 49 barcodes with magnetic stripes.
Papua New Guinea	National identity card	E-National ID cards were rolled out in 2015.
Paraguay	Cédula de identidad civil (Civil National Identity card)	The Paraguayan national identity card is issued by the National Police and is compulsory for all citizens; with a cost of 8,500 Paraguayan guaraní.
Peru	National Identity Card (Peru)	National Document of Identification or Documento Nacional de Identidad (DNI). Citizens can have a minor DNI but at the age of 17 they are encouraged to renew their DNI to get an Adult DNI. At 18, it is compulsory.
Philippines	Pambansang Pagkakakilanlan (Philippine Identification Card)	Main article: Philippine identity card The Philippine Identification System (PhilSys) ID is issued to all Filipino citizens and resident aliens in the Philippines as part of the country’s registry of citizens and permanent residents. It is available in card, paper, and digital formats, all of which are considered equivalent. Registration in the system is compulsory; however, possession of the card itself is not. The pilot implementation began in selected regions in 2018 and full implementation began in 2019. The card harmonizes existing government-initiated identification cards issued including the Unified Multi-Purpose ID issued to members of the Social Security System, Government Service Insurance System, Philippine Health Insurance Corporation, and Home Development Mutual Fund (Pag-IBIG Fund). This will also replace the Alien Certificate of Registration (ACR) Card for foreign residents and expatriates who are living in the Philippines permanently.
Poland	Dowód osobisty (Identity card)	At 18, Polish citizens with their permanent residence in Poland must obtain Polish National Identity Card, however at 13 years of age some form of identification is required. The ID Card is issued free of charge. Those who do not comply with the relevant law are subject to restriction of freedom (community sentence) for up to one month or a fine. Pre-war Polish IDs were issued on-demand. Compulsory German ID cards (Kennkarte) were introduced during the Nazi-German occupation on 1939-10-26. Compulsory Polish IDs were introduced into Polish law in 1951. In many circumstances, a Polish passport may be used as an equivalent form of identification. Polish citizens without their permanent residence in Poland may obtain the card at any issuing office in Poland. Residents of Poland who are not Polish citizens may use Polish government issued residence card, instead. The oldest style of IDs, paper – similar to passports, is not valid since 2008-03-31. New style IDs issued after 2001 and before 2015 to people 65 years of age or older are valid indefinitely, otherwise the document is valid for ten years or five years (when issued under 18).
Portugal	Cartão de Cidadão (Citizen card)	As of 2006 the government has issued the Cartão do Cidadão (Citizen Card). The older Bilhete de identidade which has been compulsory at 10, is still in limited use. All citizens starting at the age of 6 are required to obtain an identity card, but are not required to carry them. According to other sources it is required to carry them.
Qatar	Qatari ID Card	As of 2014 the government has issued a Qatari ID Card to every Qatari citizen and resident over the age of 15. There are currently two types of cards in use, the smart card can be used to identify in government websites as well as for easier access to the country.
Romania	Carte de identitate (identity card)	The Carte de identitate, informally known as buletin, is mandatory since age 14, then reissued at 18, then at 25, and then every ten years until the person reaches the age of 55, from which there's no need of reissuement. The person bearing the buletin is required to reissue it everytime a notable modification, such as name or address modification, occurs. Since 2007, Romanian citizens may travel internally in the European Union and to some states outside of it using only those, not needing a passport.
Russia	Internal passport of Russia	A Russian identity document is issued to any citizen on request at the age of 14 and reissued at ages 20 and 45. People may use other documents for identity as well (e.g., driver's license, passport), but only in limited number of cases. Banks, post offices and authority offices require internal passport for identification.
Rwanda	Rwandan National Identity Card	Compulsory for all Rwandan citizens living in the country, with a price of 1,500 RWF. Valid for international travel to Kenya and Uganda.
Saint Vincent and the Grenadines	National Identity Card	Compulsory.
San Marino	San Marino identity card	Compulsory for all Sanmarinese citizens. Any citizen or resident can get an identification card Biometric and valid for international travel since 2016.
São Tomé and Príncipe	Bilhete de identidade (identity card)	Compulsory. Issued since 2008.
Saudi Arabia	بطاقة الأحوال المدنية (Biṭaqat Al-Aḥwal Al-Madaniya, Iqama or Bataka)	Compulsory for men 17 and older and optional for teenage boys aged 15–16. Optional for women but issued to women 18 and older. Compulsory for citizens, expatriates, and residents.
Senegal	Carte Nationale d'identité CEDEAO (CEDEAO National Identity card)	Compulsory for all citizens. Biometric since 2017.
Serbia	Лична карта (Identity card)	Compulsory for citizens 16 and older permanently residing in Serbia, and compulsory for non-citizens residing in Serbia. Optional for minors 10–15. Must be carried whenever in public. Although the identity card is the most commonly used identification document, three others will suffice: a passport, driver's licence, or refugee ID card.
Seychelles	National Identity card	Compulsory for all Seychelles citizens, with a cost of SR50.
Sierra Leone	Sierra Leone identity card	Compulsory for citizens and permanent residents with a price of 10,000 SLL every 5 years.
Singapore	National Registration Identity Card	Compulsory for citizens and permanent residents 15 and older and must be renewed upon turning 30 and upon turning 55 if born after January 1962. The NRIC does not need to be carried at all times, and it need not be produced to police officers who are merely screening passers-by while on patrol. But it is sometimes necessary to produce one's NRIC: for example, when renewing one's passport, voting, and applying for public services. Notably, the NRIC includes the bearer's race, among typical demographic information.
Slovakia	Občiansky preukaz (citizen card)	Compulsory for citizens 15 and older and is used to identify the bearer in daily interaction with authorities. The citizen card includes the bearer's photograph, birth date, address, and unique number.
Somalia	Warqadda Aqoonsiga (identity card)	Compulsory for all Somali citizens. Electronic since 2014.
South Africa	South African identity card	Compulsory for citizens 16 and older, and compulsory for all non-citizen permanent residents. The older form of Identity Document, in the form of a green booklet, began being phased out in 2013. Although passports and driver's licences are also acceptable forms of identification, banks only accept a national identity card. Your ID has a barcode, a photo, and a unique number. The ten digit identity number encodes a person's date of birth and gender, but not race (during apartheid the 9th digit encoded race, but was replaced with an 8). A national identity card is necessary to obtain a passport, bank account, and driver's licence, and is also necessary to register to vote and to vote. Private companies and security estates often photocopy a visitor's identity card to process the visitor's appointment. Because it is sometimes necessary to produce a national identity card, many South Africans carry their card at all times, however there is no legal requirement for it to be carried at all times.
South Korea	주민등록증 (Identity card)	Compulsory for citizens 17 and older. This card contains the citizen's unique resident registration number, which is required for government and private business, for example, opening bank accounts and creating online accounts with web sites and gaming networks. All citizens must submit and save their 10 fingerprints to the criminal database operated by National Police Agency and right thumb fingerprint to Ministry of Interior and Safety at the time of ID card application.
South Sudan	National ID	Issued to every South Sudanese of at least eighteen years of age for purposes of employment or as required by a “competent authority.” South Sudan also issues a second similar document known as the 'Nationality Certificate'. This latest one is the document granted to a South Sudanese National who is eligible for national status in accordance with the provisions of Chapter III of the Nationality Act, 2011
Spain	Documento Nacional de Identidad (DNI) (National Identity Card)	Compulsory for any resident 14 and older (Spanish citizens living abroad are exempt). Minors younger than 14 can obtain a DNI, for example, to travel to other European countries. It is routinely used for identification and is often necessary to conduct public and private business. Many companies and government offices photocopy a bearer's DNI. Beginning in 2006, the DNI has been replaced by the DNI electrónico (electronic DNI). Since 2015, the National identity card became fully biometric, releasing yet again, a new design.
Sri Lanka	National Identity Card ජාතික හැඳුනුම්පත தேசிய அடையாள அட்டை	All citizens over the age of 16 need to apply for a National Identity Card (NIC). Each NIC has a unique 10 digit number, in the format 000000000A (where 0 is a digit and A is a letter). The first two digits of the number are your year of birth (e.g., 88xxxxxxxx for someone born in 1988). The final letter is generally a V or X. An NIC number is required to apply for a passport (over 16), driving license (over 18) and to vote (over 18). In addition, all citizens are required to carry their NIC on them at all times as proof of identity, given the security situation in the country. NICs are not issued to non-citizens, but they too are required to carry some form of photo identification (such as a photocopy of their passport or foreign driving license) at all times. In addition the Department of Post may issue an identity card with a validity of five years, this may be gained in lieu of an NIC if the latter is unable to be issued.
Sudan	National identity card	Compulsory for all Sudanese citizens.
Suriname	Identiteitskaart (national identity card)	Compulsory for all Surinamese citizens.
Syria	بطاقة الهوية الوطنية (National ID card)	Compulsory for all Syrian citizens. Must be uptained at the age of 14. Information displayed in Arabic only.
Taiwan	National Identification Card 國民身份證 / Guómín Shēnfèn Zhèng	Compulsory for ROC nationals 14 and older whose household is registered in Taiwan.
Tajikistan	Корти миллии миллӣ (national ID card)	Compulsory for all Tajik citizens. Electronic, with informations displayed in both Tajik and English since 2015.
Thailand	บัตรประจำตัวประชาชน (Thai national ID card)	Compulsory for citizens who are 7 – 70 years of age. People older than 70 years and exempted citizen can still apply for a card. A fee of ฿100 is payable in case of loss, damage or information alteration.
Tunisia	بطاقة التعريف الوطنية (Tunisian National Identification Card)	Compulsory for citizens 18 and older. A minor can obtain a national identity card with a legal ascendant(s) approval.
Turkey	Kimlik Kartı (Identity card)	Compulsory from birth and must be carried at all times. A photograph is optional until the bearer turns 15. It is often photocopied at government offices, banks, and the like.
Uganda	National Identity Card	Compulsory for Ugandan citizens anywhere in the world, and compulsory for non-citizen permanent residents in Uganda. In April–August 2014 the government registered sixteen out of eighteen million citizens. In 2017 the government began a nationwide effort to register children. An identity card or identity number is required for all government services, including voting, as well as many private services—for example, opening bank accounts, buying insurance policies, transferring interests in real property.
Ukraine	Паспорт громадянина України (Passport of Ukrainian citizen)	Compulsory for citizens 14 and older. Before 2016, the national identity card was a blue soft paper booklet like the typical international passport. In 2016, the government began issuing credit-card-sized biometric identity cards (a/k/a "internal passport" or "passport card") containing an RFID chip. The bearer's address is not printed on the card but is instead coded on the chip and can be accessed by any NFC compatible device. The card is printed in Ukrainian and English except for patronymic information that is only printed in Ukrainian. Cards last ten years before expiring, except that minors' identity cards must be renewed upon turning 18.
United Arab Emirates	بطاقة الهوية الوطنية (National ID Card)	Compulsory for citizens, expatriates and residents. This is also known as Emirates ID.
Uruguay	Documento de identidad (Spanish) Carteira de identidade (Portuguese)	The Identity document (previously known as "Cédula de idenitdad"), are issued to all Uruguayan citizens and legal residents, Required for children older than 45 day. Documents for uruguayan citizens are in blue and documents for legal residents are in yellow with inscription "EXTRANJERO". It is required for many things such as credit card transactions, age verification, etc.
Uzbekistan	Shaxs Guvohnmasi (National identity card)	Until 2020 Uzbekistan passport was also used as internal identity document.
Venezuela	Cédula de Identidad (Identity card)	Compulsory for anyone 10 and older, and it must be renewed every 10 years.
Vietnam	Căn cước (Identity Card)	All citizens above 14 years old must possess a citizen identification card (latest version is an electronic ID card), provided by the local authority, and must be reissued when the citizens' years of age reach 25, 40 and 60. Formerly a people's ID document was used.
Yemen	National identity card	Has an identity card. It is unclear if it is mandatory or not.
Zambia	National Registration Card	Compulsory for citizens aged 16 and older. It is laminated and must be carried at all times. The national identity card for citizens is green having the last digit of 1, Blue in colour with 2 as the last digit for Commonwealth and Pink in colour with 3 as the last digit for other.
Zimbabwe	National Registration Card	Compulsory for citizens 16 and older. It is plastic and must be carried at all times.

=== Countries with de-jure non-compulsory but de-facto compulsory identity cards ===
These are countries where official authorities issue identity cards to those who request them, it is not illegal to be without an official identity document, but practically many essential administrative operations are impossible or extremely difficult without an identity card. In these countries, basically all people request the identity card.

Country	Name	Description
Netherlands	Identiteitskaart (Dutch identity card)	Although it is not compulsory to get an identity card, since 1 January 2005 it is compulsory to show identification when an authorized officer asks for it, from the age of 14. An authorized officer can only do so under certain circumstances which include suspicious behaviour, committing any offence, or if a person is interviewed as a witness of a crime. Identity checks at events where public order may be in danger are also allowed. Random ID-checks are not allowed but can still happen in certain areas under certain circumstances such as at a train station or in suspicious areas such as streets where prostitution is rife, and a fine for not showing proof of identity may be successfully challenged in such cases. The fine for not being able to show proof of identity when legally required is €60 (16 and over) or €30 (if 14 or 15). Proof of identity is also required when opening a bank account and when entering an employment contract. Having identification and the ability to identify oneself is mandatory, but carrying identification is not. If a person is in possession of an ID-card but is not carrying it at the time of being asked to identify themselves, as long as that person demonstrates a willingness to take the authorities to whatever place the ID-card is stored (no matter how far) they are operating within the bounds of the law. The lack of mandatory carrying laws date back to the Nazi occupation of the Netherlands, where such laws did exist and were used to carry out genocide on the Dutch population.

=== Countries with non-compulsory identity cards ===
These are countries where official authorities issue identity cards to those who request them, but where it is not illegal to be without an official identity document. For some services, identification is needed, but documents such as passports or identity cards issued by banks or driving licences can be used. In countries where national identity cards are fully voluntary, they are often not so commonly used, because many already have a passport and a driving licence, so a third identity document is often considered superfluous.

Country	Description
Armenia	Optional.
Austria	Austrian identity card
Barbados	Optional, although compulsory for voting and other government transactions. New biometric national ID cards were released since June 2022.
Belize	Optional, although compulsory for voting and other government transactions. Available also for any Commonwealth country citizen who has lived in Belize for a year without leaving and been at least 2 months in an area where the person has been registered in. National ID cards received a new design in 2019.New biometric national cards are being developed by the Belizean government. These new cards are expected to replace existing voters ID card and health cards.
Cayman Islands (United Kingdom)	Optional and not fully launched. Legislation was enacted in 2022.
Congo, Democratic Republic of the	New national identity card began issuance on a limited basis on June 30, 2023 under the auspices of the National Office for the Identification of the Population (ONIP), later to be fully rolled out to the wider population. The Elector Card (Carte d'Electeur), issued by the Independent Electoral Commission (CENI) served as de facto proof of identity, status as well as fulfilling the primary purpose of electoral verification processes.
Denmark	Voluntary identity cards are issued by local municipalities since 2017. The ID cards do not follow EU standard for national identity cards and are not usable as travel documentation outside Denmark. Danish driver's licenses are also accepted as identity cards in Denmark. (See Identity document#Denmark).
Dominica	The Dominica national multpurpose identitification card is optional for all Dominiquais nationals and is valid for international travel within OECS countries.
Ethiopia	A foundational digital ID, that focuses on a unique number (instead of a card), and this unique number, known as Fayda Identification Number is the primary identifier and essentially serves as a legal ID. The system is colloquially known as Fayda(ፋይዳ) to signify “value” in Amharic and other languages. This national digital ID system also offers real-time online and offline authentication to support eKYC. It is consent-based biometric-backed identification for all legal residents of Ethiopia (non-citizens and minors are also eligible).
Fiji	In 2010 and 2012, there were proposals for a compulsory identity card ideas that did not progress. However, national voter's ID card (electronic since 2017) are available upon request and compulsory for certain governmental transactions (e.g.: voting).
Finland	A national identity card exists, usable all over the EU and a number of other countries, but commonly people use their driving licences or passports as ID.
France	French national identity cards have been issued in their current form since 1955 and are voluntary. Identity cards are issued free of charge. However, French authorities have extensive powers to verify identities in public and as such French nationals and residents tend to carry identification with them, a person can be detained if one cannot identify oneself. Other official documents such as a student card, driving licence or passport are usually acceptable.
Gibraltar (United Kingdom)	Main article: Gibraltar identity card The British Overseas Territory of Gibraltar has a voluntary ID card system for citizens, valid in the UK and EU/European Free Trade Association member countries.
Grenada	The Grenada Voter ID card is optional, although compulsory for certain governmental transactions.
Iceland	Registers Iceland (Þjóðskrá) voluntarily issues Icelandic national identity cards (Nafnskírteini) to Icelandic citizens. The ID card conforms to biometric ICAO and EU standards and can be used as a travel document in the EU/EEA and the Nordic countries. The IDs are uncommon and most people use driving licences or passports. Identity documentation is not legally required.
India	The Aadhaar ID number is a digital biometric identity issued voluntarily to residents of India, and can be issued in card form, but it is not compulsory. Proof of identity such as a Birth Certificate, SSC Certificate, HSC Certificate, passport, ration card, PAN card, APAAR ID, Voter id Card or driving licence can also be used as proof of identity.
Ireland	The Irish passport card is designed for travel within Europe and is also usable as domestic identification within Ireland. Other accepted forms of identification are driving licences and passport books. A proof of age card is also available. A Public Services Card was introduced in 2011 to access Department of Social Protection services.
Italy	The Italian identity card may be issued to anyone who is legally resident in Italy and to Italian citizens living abroad. While it is not compulsory to have it or to carry it, it is widespread for performing many essential administrative operations, such as voting, applying for a passport or a driving license, opening a bank account, enrolling in a university, renting or buying a house, and traveling into or out of Italy. Police officers can request a form of identification, and failing to provide it may result in detention for up to 24 hours for identification purposes.
Jamaica	Optional, although compulsory for voting and other government transactions. Since 2022 a brand new biometric National ID Card has been unveiled, free of charge for Jamaican citizens.
Japan	An Individual Number Card is issued to citizens of Japan as well as legal residents. It was introduced in 2016 and replaces the Juki-Card.
Latvia	A Personas apliecība (identity card) is issued. An ID or passport is mandatory for a citizen of Latvia or a non-citizen who lives in Latvia and has reached 18.
Liechtenstein	The Principality of Liechtenstein has a voluntary ID card system for citizens, the Identitätskarte (Liechenstein identity card)
Lithuania	Asmens tapatybės kortelė (Identity Card). A passport or Identity Card is compulsory at age 16.
Libya	Identity cards, or "Personal ID cards" are issued to all residents aged over 16. As of 2023, eID cards are in development.
Marshall Islands	An "Identification Card" seems to exist amongst citizens of the Marshall Islands, but little information is found on these documents.
Mexico	The National Electorate Institute (Instituto Nacional Electoral, INE) issues Voter Credential cards (credencial para votar) to Mexican citizens over 18 years of age. This card is required to participate in Federal level elections and while it is the de facto ID for most legal transactions, it is not mandatory to have one. Mexican minors, between the ages of four and 17, were able to get a personal ID card named cédula de identidad personal, but the government stopped issuing it in 2013. Both documents can be used to demonstrate Mexican nationality and thus enter Mexico from abroad, be it by air, sea or land.
Federated States of Micronesia	National Identity cards, called “FSM Voters National Identity card”, are issued on an optional base, free of charge. The Identity Cards were introduced in 2005.
Norway	The Norwegian national identity card has been voluntarily issued since 30 November 2020. Previously bank identification cards were common. Driving licences and passports are also commonly used as identification.
Palau	Republic of Palau Identification Cards are primarily issued to foreign nationals whom are not eligible to acquire a Palau passport or driver's license, under the Digital Residency Act. Foreign nationals are required to undergo a sanctions check.
Saint Kitts and Nevis	National Identity Cards are optional. Issued since 2010.
Saint Lucia	Passport or Identity Card is compulsory for all Saint Lucian citizens.
Samoa	The Samoan Office of Vital Statistics issues Government IDs. As of 2024, due to be modernised an updated with a digital identity number and card.
Slovenia	Osebna izkaznica (identity card) is issued for citizens 18 and older who have a permanent residence in Slovenia who do not have a passport. Citizens younger than 18 may obtain an identity card with their legal ascendant(s) permission. It must be carried at all times.
Solomon Islands	National Voter's Identity Cards are optional upon request.
Sweden	Having a Swedish identity card is not mandatory, but it is needed in several situations, e.g. for bank services or when picking up a package at a post office. Sweden has since 2005 issued EU standard national identity cards, but they are not compulsory and only obtainable by Swedish citizens, mostly intended to use for intra-Schengen area travel. The Swedish tax authority does, since 2009, issue official identity cards for anyone resident in Sweden. Driver's license are the most commonly used identity document in Sweden. Between 2005 and 2009 it was almost impossible for immigrants to get a card because of tightened security to get a bank card, since a close relative with a Swedish identity document had to vouch for their identity. A crime that results in a fine (e.g. riding public transport without a ticket) can be dodged by not having an ID card, which can lead to detainment in Sweden.
Switzerland	The Swiss identity card is issued to any Swiss citizen. It is not mandatory to carry, but a national identity card or a passport is needed in some situations. Driver's licenses are not always valid as identity document as they don't expire and can be old.
Tanzania	Optional, although needed for certain civil (SIM cards) and government transactions.
Togo	Optional to all Togolese nationals.
Tonga	Tonga's National ID Card was first issued in 2010, and it is optional, along with the driver's licenses and passports. Either one of these are mandatory for to vote though. Applicants need to be 14 years of age or older to apply for a National ID Card.
Trinidad and Tobago	The Elections and Boundaries Commission (EBC) is responsible for the issuing of National Identification Cards. A National Identification (ID) Card is issued to a citizen or eligible resident when they register to vote. The National ID Card is an electoral document used as proof of identity when voting. It is also accepted as a primary form of identification within Trinidad and Tobago, and can be obtained before voting age. Eligible for the card are citizens of Trinidad and Tobago of 15 years of age or older, and Commonwealth citizens 15 years of age or older who have resided legally in Trinidad and Tobago for at least one year immediately preceding the application. The National ID Card is valid for 10 years. It is not, however, mandatory when voting; other forms if ID, including passport or driver's permit, can be presented.
Turkmenistan	An internal passport (Turkmen: içerki pasport), officially called a citizenship passport (Turkmen: raýatlyk pasporty) is issued to Turkmen citizens.
United States	No national identity card, although the U.S. passport card is issued voluntarily by the federal government via the Department of State for a fee of $30. The primary purpose of the passport card is used as a federal issued Identity card and a limited travel document under the Western Hemisphere Travel Initiative for travel by land and sea to Canada, Mexico, Bermuda and the Caribbean. The cards are proof of U.S. citizenship and accepted for domestic airline travel under the REAL ID Act. However, the predominant means of identification remains the driver's license or ID card issued by each state, and do not indicate citizenship. In some states, there are Stop and identify statutes meaning that identification can be demanded. However, there is no obligation to carry or own an identification card federally in the U.S. However, the U.S. uses the Social Security number as the de facto national ID number of the country, even though little information and no ID pictures are displayed.
Vanuatu	National Identity Cards are being issued since October 2017. Plans for rolling out biometric cards were due for the late 2018.
Vatican City	The Holy See issues identity cards for Vatican City citizens for main identification. It is unclear if it is compulsory or not.
Western Sahara	National identity cards are issued by the Sahrawi Arab Democratic Republic government, but much of Western Sahara is controlled by Morocco, which treats the area as an integral part of Morocco. Morocco also has a mandatory national identity card.

=== Countries with no identity cards ===
These are countries where official authorities do not issue any identity cards. When identification is needed, e.g. passports, driving licences, bank cards etc. can be used, along with manual verification such as utility bills and bank statements. Most countries that are not listed at all in this page have no national ID card.

Country	Description
Andorra	No national identity card in the principality. Passports, driving licenses are most commonly used for identification. When visiting France or Spain a driving license may be accepted unofficially.
Australia	No national identity card. Passports, driver licences or photo cards issued by state or territory governments and medicare cards are commonly accepted as identification. In 1985, there was a failed proposal to create an Australia Card. In 2007, there was another failed proposal to create a non-compulsory Access Card that would act as a gateway to The Department of Human Services.
Bahamas	No national identity card. Plans for introducing new identity cards were established in 2013, however no progress has been made so far. In 2022, the government announced ID cards would be rolled out in 2023. However, as of July 2025, no progress has been made on this.
Canada	No national identity or passport card. In the past, Canadian citizenship cards were issued to new Canadians upon naturalization and established Canadians upon request, but were discontinued in 2012. Passports and driver's licences issued by the provinces are the primary form of identification. All provinces and territories except Quebec also issue separate photo identification cards for non-drivers. Health cards, issued by the provinces are used as supplemental or alternative identification.
Nauru	No national identity card.
New Zealand	No national identity card. Acceptable documents for proof of identification may include passports, firearms licences, driving licences, a SuperGold (senior citizen's) card. Kiwi Access (18+) cards can be used for proof of age.
Tuvalu	No national identity card.
United Kingdom	Identity cards were introduced on a limited voluntary basis in 2009-2010 under the Identity Cards Act 2006 but were abolished in 2010 after a change of government. Acceptable documents for proof of identification may include passports, driving licences, birth certificates and utility bills depending on the purpose. The Proof of Age Standards Scheme (PASS) is a government-backed scheme under which various organisations issue photo ID cards, used mainly for proof of age purposes.

== See also ==
- Identity document
- Cédula de identidad
- National identity cards in the European Economic Area
- Stop and identify statutes
- Obligation of identification
- National biometric ID card
- CCTV camera

== Notes ==
- As noted above, certain countries do not have national ID cards, but have other official documents that play the same role in practice (e.g. driver's license for the United States). While a country may not make it de jure compulsory to own or carry an identity document, it may be de facto strongly recommended to do so in order to facilitate certain procedures.
- In most countries, non-resident foreign citizens have to be able to identify themselves through a passport. For residents with "foreign" characteristics (e.g. skin color, dialect) possession of an acceptable identity card might be useful to reduce the risk of harassment from the police and other authorities.
- In many countries, people suspected of crime will be detained until their identity is proven even in countries not requiring an identity card.

== Sources ==
- Krasniqi, Gëzim (March 2018). "Contested Territories, Liminal Polities, Performative Citizenship: A Comparative Analysis" (PDF). cadmus.eui.eu. Badia Fiesolana: European University Institute. Archived (PDF) from the original on 27 March 2018.
- Manby, Bronwen (February 2020). "Nationality and Statelessness Among Persons of Western Saharan Origin". Journal of Immigration, Asylum and Nationality Law. 34 (1). Haywards Heath, West Sussex: Bloomsbury Publishing: 9–29. ISSN 1746-7632. OCLC 1158311076. Archived from the original on 21 June 2021.
