= Citizen Identity Card (Mongolia) =

National identity card of Mongolia

Citizen Identity Card of Mongolia
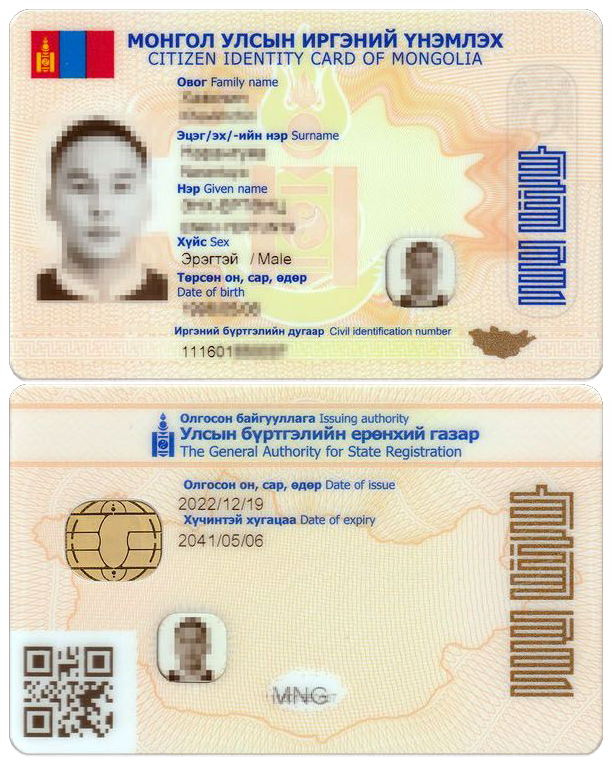
- The front and reverse of a Citizen Identity Card
- Type: Compulsory identity card
- Issued by: General Authority for State Registration; Mongolia
- Purpose: Proof of identity
- Eligibility: Mongolian citizens over the age of 16
- Expiration: At ages 25 and 45
- Cost: 18,300₮ If damaged, lost, 33300₮

The Citizen Identity Card of Mongolia (Mongolian: Монгол Улсын Иргэний үнэмлэх) is a compulsory identification document issued to Mongolian citizens over the age of 16. The card's usage is regulated by the General Law on State Registration and the Law on Civil State Registration.

The card contains information regarding the bearer's family name, surname, and given name; date of birth; sex; civil registration number (Mongolian: иргэний бүртгэлийн дугаар); the card's issuing authority; and the dates of issuance and expiry.

== History ==
The Mongolian People's Republic introduced a Civil passport (Mongolian: Иргэний паспорт) in 1940, paving the way for a national registration system. Starting in the 1960s, internal migration intensified in the country, and a corresponding need to control migration and social order resulted in new regulations. In 1968, a civil identification card was introduced. By the 1970s, there were two main identification documents for citizens: a civil passport for residents of Ulaanbaatar, Erdenet, Darkhan, and Selenge, and a separate civil identification card for residents of other provinces. This inconsistency was recognized, and from 1974 to 1981, a universal passportization process was undertaken, with 97% of citizens over 16 being issued a civil passport.

The 1990 revolution and 1992 constitution provided for freedom of movement and residence within the country, and with reserves of the civil passport blanks finishing and the old system having various human rights and privacy concerns, a new identity card was issued starting 1999 to 2003.

Starting in 2012, a new smart card (Mongolian: Цахим үнэмлэх) was introduced, which includes an embedded microprocessor containing personal and biometric data. A further change was introduced in 2022, with the bearer's home address and registration number (Mongolian: регистрийн дугаар) removed from the physical cards.

== Issuance ==
The Citizen Identity Card is issued to Mongolian citizens at ages 16, 25, and 45, with citizens obligated to apply in-person for the card within 30 days of reaching those ages.

== See also ==
- Mongolian passport
