= Unified Multi-Purpose ID =

Philippine identity document

United Multi-Purpose ID
- Logo of UMID

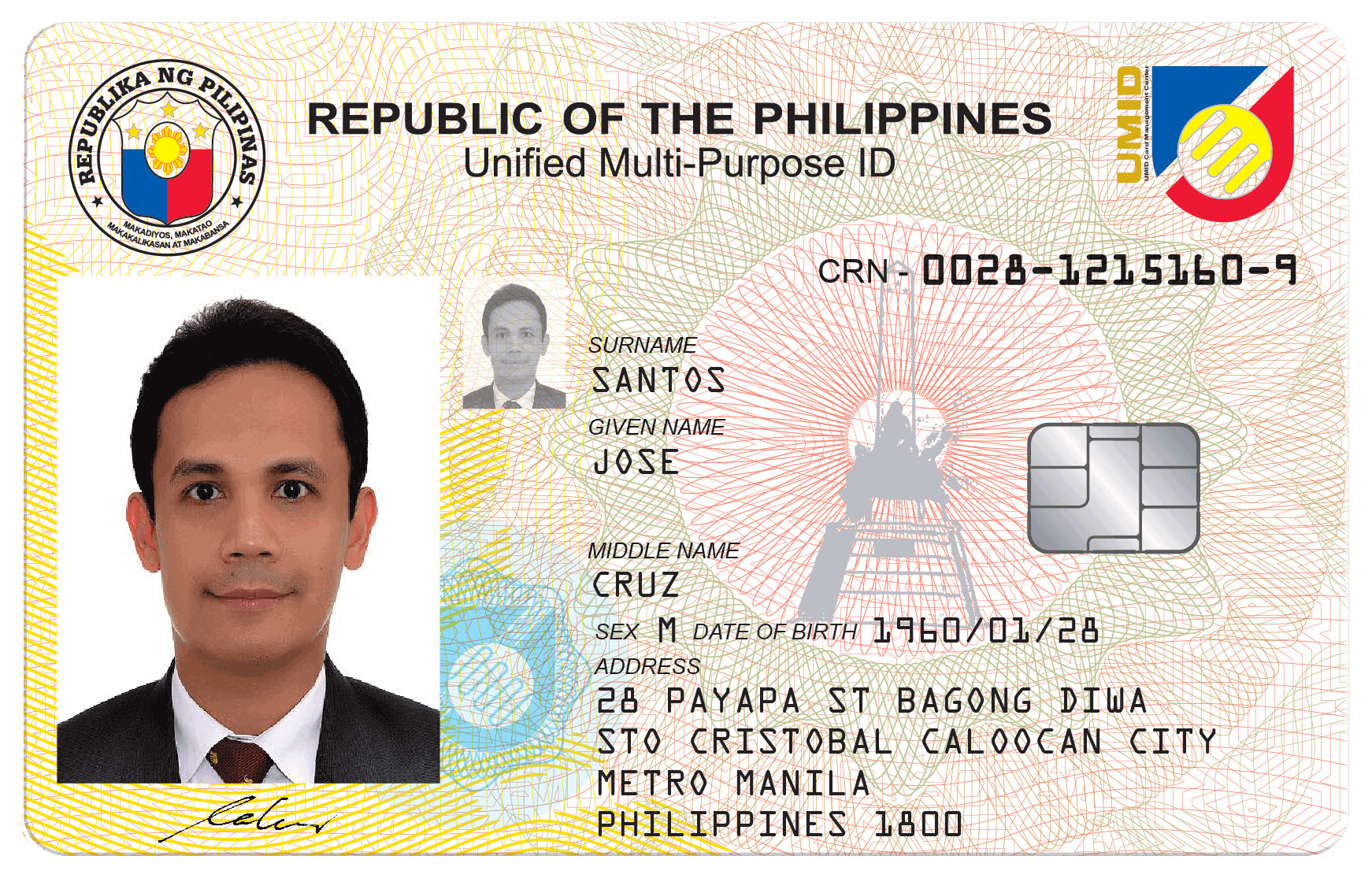
- Sample scanned image of UMID
- Type: Identity document
- Issued by: Philippines
- First issued: 2010
- Purpose: Identification
- Eligibility: Social Security System, Government Service Insurance System, Home Development Mutual Fund membership
- Cost: Free of charge

The Unified Multi-Purpose ID (UMID) is a Philippine identity card that was introduced in 2010. The card was developed as a single card for the relations between several government-related agencies. The agency responsible for implementation is the Social Security System (SSS), and also the Government Service Insurance System (GSIS), the Philippine Health Insurance Corporation (PhilHealth), and the Pag-IBIG Fund (Home Development Mutual Fund) use the card. The card was also suggested to be used as a voter ID.

== History ==
As part of the efforts of the Philippine government to establish a national identification document aimed at streamlining the identification systems of government agencies, a series of executive orders were enacted: Executive No. 420 signed on April 13, 2005 which institutionalized the UMID system, and Executive Order No. 700 signed on January 16, 2008 which directed the Social Security System to facilitate the ID systems of all government agencies and GOCCs.

In April 2024, the GSIS announced that it would end the issuance of UMID cards on the 31st of May 2024 in favor of the GSIS Digital ID system; existing cards remain valid. On October 1, 2025, the SSS announced the MySSS Card, a hybrid ID and debit card which supersedes the UMID.

== Physical appearance ==
The card features the text "Republic of the Philippines, Unified Multi-Purpose ID" on the top. Information fields on the front include:

- Surname
- Given Name
- Middle Name
- Sex
- Date of Birth
- Address

The card also contains a picture of the bearer's face, signature and common reference number (CRN) or SSS number on the front.

Until 2016, the back side featured the seals of the SSS, PhilHealth, Pag-IBIG, and GSIS.

== Controversy ==
In 2006, Kilusang Mayo Uno filed a case at the Supreme Court assailing the constitutionality of Executive Order (EO) 420, the legislation that mandated the creation of the UMID issued by President Gloria Macapagal Arroyo, on the grounds that it allegedly usurped legislative functions by the executive branch of government by, among others, using public funds not appropriated by Congress, and that it violated constitutional provisions on the right to privacy by Filipinos.

The Supreme Court denied their petition. It held that EO 420 did not require special appropriation because the existing ID card systems of government entities covered by EO 420 already have the proper appropriation or funding. It also did not apply to all branches of government and the act of getting one is not compulsory on all citizens. Therefore, it held, that EO 420 did not establish a national ID system in the Philippines. Additionally, the Court said, "If government entities under the Executive department decide to unify their existing ID data collection and ID card issuance systems to achieve savings, efficiency, compatibility and convenience, such act does not involve the exercise of any legislative power."

As regards the people's right to privacy, the Court held that such right does not bar the adoption of reasonable ID systems by government entities. It noted that "the GSIS, SSS, LTO, Philhealth and other government entities have been issuing ID cards in the performance of their governmental functions" and there have been no complaints from the public that these entities violate their right to privacy. It also mentioned that EO 420 authorizes the collection and recording of only 14 specific data while prior to its issuance, government agencies had a free hand to determine the kind, nature and extent of data to be collected and stored for their ID systems. Furthermore, the Court held that EO 420 contains provisions that institute safeguards to protect the collected data's confidentiality.

== See also ==
- Philippine national identity card
