= Mongolian passport =

Passport issued to Mongolia nationals

- Front cover of a contemporary Mongolian biometric passport issued since 2023
- Type: Passport
- Issued by: (Mongolia) General Authority for State Registration
- First issued: March 15, 2023 (biometric passport)
- Purpose: Identification
- Eligibility: Mongolian citizenship
- Expiration: 5 or 10 years after issuance
- Cost: ₮82,500 (biometric) ₮32,500 (regular)

The Mongolian passport (Mongolian: Монгол Улсын Гадаад Паспорт) is a passport issued to Mongolian citizens for purposes of travel outside Mongolia. Mongolian citizens have visa-free or visa on arrival access to 62 countries and territories. Passports are issued by the General Authority for State Registration, an implementing agency of the Ministry of Justice and Internal Affairs of Mongolia.

In medieval times, the Mongol Empire issued paiza or gerege to officials and emissaries, authorizing them to claim facilities for travel throughout the empire using the yam or örtöö system of relay stations which provided food and remounts.

During the Mongolian People's Republic era, all citizens were required to register and apply for a civil passport as a primary form of identification. This was replaced with the current Citizen Identity Card in the early 2000s.

== Types of passports ==
- Ordinary passport (red), Энгийн паспорт
- Official passport (green), Албан паспорт
- Diplomatic passport (blue), Дипломат паспорт

== Description ==
Mongolian passports since 2023 are colored bright red, with the Mongolian emblem in the top of the front cover, below the words "ᠮᠣᠩᠭᠣᠯ ᠤᠯᠤᠰ" "MONGOLIA" in folded Mongolian script and English, respectively. The word "PASSPORT" is inscribed below the emblem. The inner pages are decorated with the Soyombo symbol. The regular passport contains 32 pages, and the biometric passport contains 42 pages.

Mongolian passports are valid for up to 10 years for persons over the age of 16. They are bilingual, using both Mongolian and English.

=== Identity information page ===
Mongolian passport information appears on page 2, and includes the following:

- Photo of passport holder on the left
- Type (E) Төрөл
- Code of State (MNG) Улсын нэрийн товчлол
- Passport no. Паспортын дугаар
- Surname Эцэг (эх)-ийн нэр
- Personal No. Бүртгэлийн
- Given name Нэр
- Nationality Иргэний харьяалал
- Date of birth Төрсөн он, сар, өдөр
- Sex Хүйс
- Date of issue Олгосон он, сар, өдөр
- Date of expiry Дуусах хугацаа

All information appears both in Mongolian and English. The information page ends with the Machine Readable Zone. The signature of bearer follows on page 4.

=== Passport note ===
The statement in a Mongolian passport declares in Mongolian and English:

Энэхүү паспортыг эзэмшигч Монгол Улсын иргэнийг ямар нэгэн саадгүйгээр чөлөөтэй нэвтрүүлж, шаардлагатай үед түүнийг хамгаалан бүх талын туслалцаа үзүүлэхийг холбогдох эрхэм этгээдээс Монгол Улсын Гадаад харилцааны сайд хичээнгүйлэн хүсч байна.

The Minister for External Relations of Mongolia requests all those whom it may concern to allow the bearer, a citizen of Mongolia, to pass freely and without hindrance and in case of need to afford him or her every assistance and protection.

=== Back cover ===
The information on the inside back cover of a Mongolian passport states in Mongolian and English:

Энэ паспорт Монгол Улсын төрийн өмч мөн.

This passport is the property of Mongolia.

== Visa requirements ==
Countries and territories with visa-free entries or visas on arrival for holders of regular Mongolian passports Mongolia Visa not required Visa on arrival eVisa Visa available both on arrival or online Visa required

As of 2024, Mongolian citizens had visa-free or visa on arrival access to 64 countries and territories, ranking the Mongolian passport 75th in the world according to the Henley Passport Index.

== See also ==
- Mongolian nationality law
- Citizen Identity Card (Mongolia)
- Visa requirements for Mongolian citizens
