= Philippine national identity card =

National identity card of the Philippines

Philippine National ID
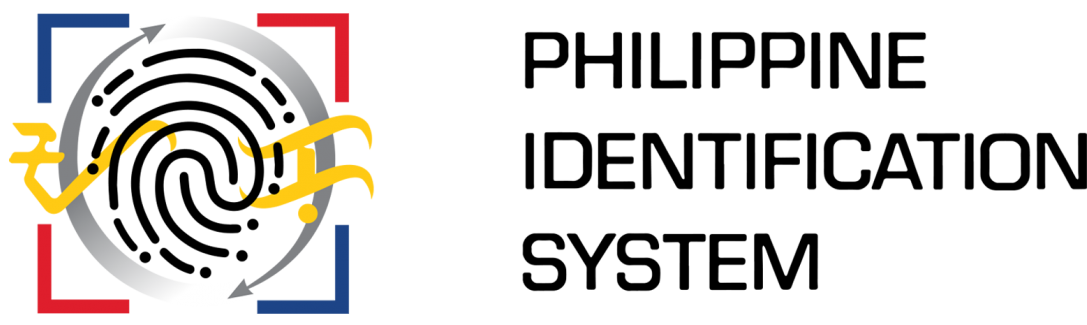
- National ID system logo

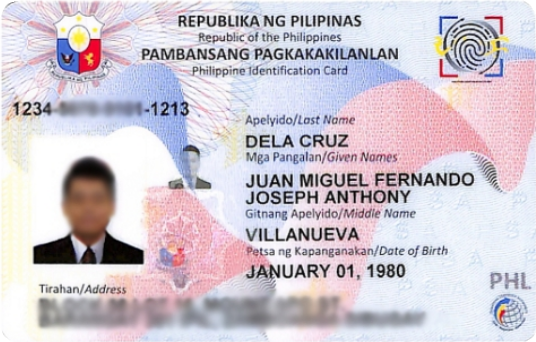
- Sample photo of the front design of the ID.
- Type: Identity document
- Issued by: Philippines
- First issued: Pilot implementation: 2019 (selected regions); Full implementation: 2020 (5-year implementation)
- Purpose: Provide valid proof of identification for all citizens and resident aliens.
- Eligibility: All ages; Philippine citizenship or permanent residency for non-citizens
- Expiration: No expiration; 1 year and annually renewable for resident aliens
- Cost: Free of charge
- Website: national-id.gov.ph

The Philippine Identification System ID (PhilSys ID), also known as the Philippine Identification Card (PhilID; Filipino: Pambansang Pagkakakilanlan) or simply the national ID, is the official national identity card for Filipino citizens worldwide and foreign permanent residents in the Philippines. The document is a significant part of the Philippine Identification System (PhilSys), the national identification system to be implemented by the Philippine government.

The Philippine Identification System Act (Republic Act No. 11055), the legislation which seeks to implement this system, was signed into law by President Rodrigo Duterte on August 6, 2018. Senator Panfilo Lacson, one of the major proponents of the act, argued that its implementation aims to reduce bureaucratic tape and criminality.

Proponents of the measure emphasize that the system will ease the access and verification of personal records when transacting with the government and private sector, while critics argue against the security of the collected data and warned against its potential to be used to violate the privacy and security of individuals. Reactions to the identity cards themselves have also been negative, criticizing printing errors, unflattering photos that are also prone to fading, the lack of the cardholder's signature, and the delays in distributing them.

== History ==
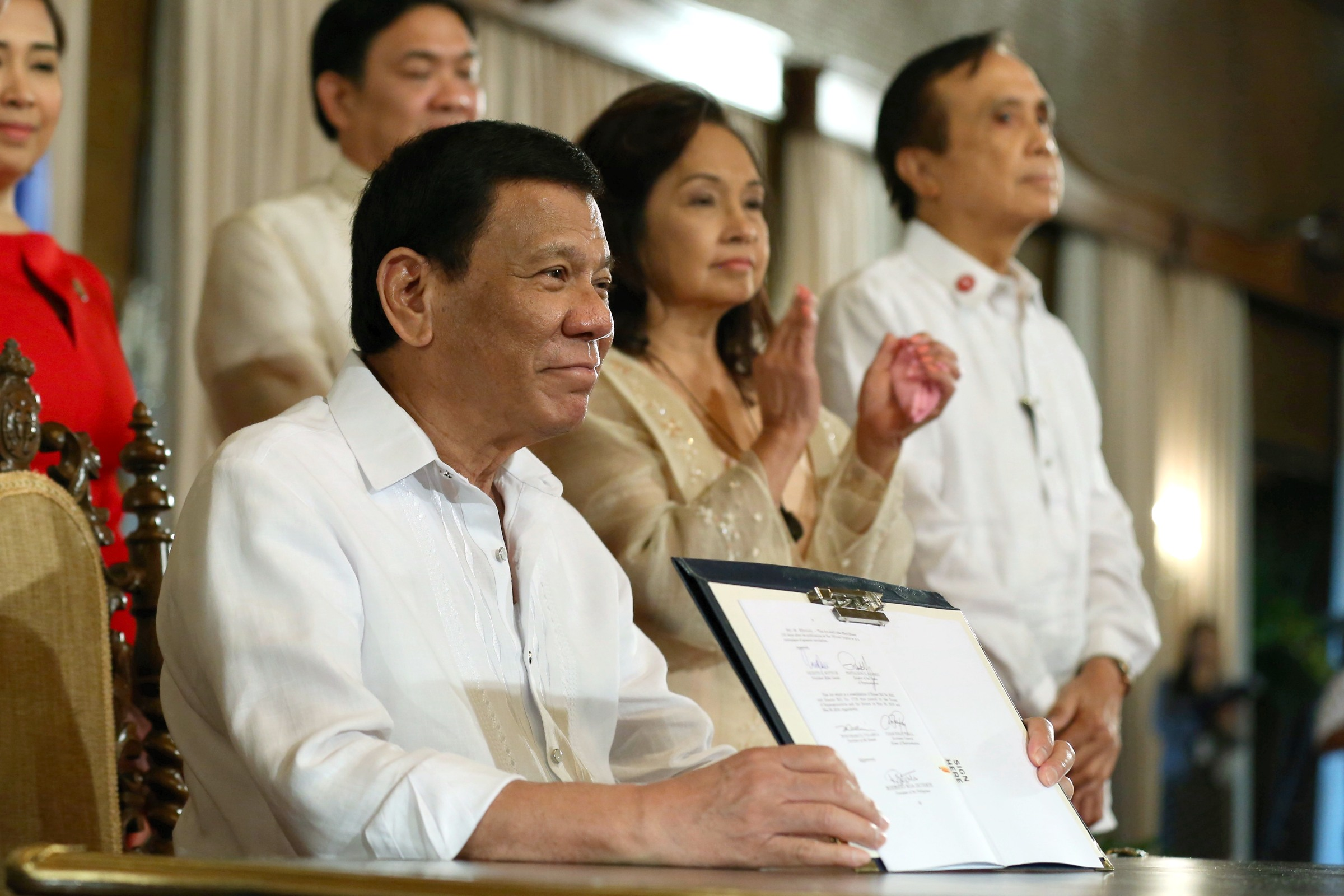
President Rodrigo Duterte shows a copy of the PhilSys Act after signing it during a ceremony at Malacañang Palace on August 6, 2018.

A national identification system for the Philippines was proposed as early as the 1990s, particularly during administration of then-President Fidel V. Ramos. However previous efforts to legislate the system has failed due to concerns in privacy and lack of support from the Congress.

Panfilo Lacson began to lobby for the establishment of such system when he was elected as Senator in 2001. During the administration of President Rodrigo Duterte the proposed national identification system had progress in the legislature. Lacson had also affirmed that the ID will help in reducing bureaucratic tape and may help solve criminality. This was also backed up by Senator Franklin Drilon, the principal author of the PhilSys Act, who noted that with a national ID system in place, it would be easier for the government to locate and verify the records of any citizen wishing to avail basic services from the government.

In mid-2016, Quezon City Representative Feliciano Belmonte Jr. and Senator Antonio Trillanes filed House of Representative Bill No. 12 and Senate Bill No. 95 for an identification system for Filipino citizens residing in the Philippines and abroad. Belmonte claims at the time of filing that the Philippines is one of the only nine countries in the world without a national identification system.

Senator Manny Pacquiao has also filed similar measures.

The framework for a Philippine national identity card system was established on August 6, 2018, when President Rodrigo Duterte signed into law the Philippine Identification System Act (R.A. 11055). Section 9 of the Act requires every Philippine citizen and resident alien to personally register with the Philippine ID system.

== Structure and usage ==
The ID contains basic information about the individual, which include demographic and biometric data. The front side of the PhilID bears the coat of arms of the Philippines and the logo of the National ID system. The information displayed in the front include the assigned PhilID Card Number (PCN), photograph of the bearer, the bearer's full name (Surname, Given Name, Middle Name), birth date, and domicile. The back features the card's date of issue, QR code, and serial number alongside the bearer's sex (Male, Female), blood type (O+/-, A+/-, B+/-, AB+/-), marital status (optional), and place of birth.

The central registry will store all registered information about the bearer and their mobile number and email address, both of which are optional, and the individual's biometrics data (full set of fingerprints set and iris scan).

Unlike most previously issued government ID cards, the PhilSys ID does not bear a visible copy of the handwritten signature of the holder. According to the PSA, the absence of handwritten information is a security feature in itself.

The ID is available in three formats: a physical card, a printed piece of paper (ePhilID), and a digital document. All are considered equivalent and valid for transactions.

As a government-issued identification document, it also can be used the day-to-day transactions of registering for a mobile phone line, obtaining certain discounts at stores and shops (especially for senior citizens), and logging on to certain websites on the internet. Schools frequently use it to identify students, both on-line and in exams. The identity number will be considered as citizen's unique identity number for life.

The ID does not replace existing government identification cards that serve a purpose beyond identity authentication, such as the driving license, passport, and UMID.

=== PhilSys Number ===
The Philippine Identification System provides for two sets of numbers; the PhilSys Number (PSN) and the PhilSys Card Number (PCN). The PSN is a randomly-generated unique and permanent 12-digit identification number assigned to each registrant. The PSN contains highly sensitive data and is meant to be confidential; it is only disclosed when required by law. The PCN is the tokenized version of the PSN that can be used for general transactions with the government and private establishments. The PCN could be used without the physical ID card.

== Initial rollout ==
Filipino citizens as well as resident aliens will be required to obtain a PhilSys ID. In an October 2018 report, PSA head (Lisa Grace S. Bersales, National Statistician and Civil Registrar General of the PSA) reported that the necessary bid procurement for the national ID system was scheduled to commence at around 3rd week of October 2018 and end around December 2018.

By November 2018, the PSA was working with the Philippine Postal Corporation (PHLPost) for the proof of concept. With the design of concept done, with testing projected for January 2019, procurement estimated ideally for June 2019, and roll-out planned for September 2019. The PSA set as a target getting 7 million Filipinos registered with priority given to beneficiaries of the government's cash transfer program and indigenous people (IP)s, while they projected that by 2023 all living Overseas Filipinos would have been issued IDs. March 2019 was the projected start of registration for one million beneficiaries of the government's Unconditional cash transfer program while the registration of 25 million Filipinos was planned to start in September 2019.

On January 7, 2019, the target was adjusted to 5 million Filipinos for 2019. The goal is that by the end of the 1st quarter to the beginning of the 2nd quarter, the PSA will master PhilSys's processes such as protocols regarding registration and transaction-number generation. September 2019 is set as the target for the launch of the Philippine ID system. By 2020, a total of 26 million Filipinos are projected to have registered with the ID system while in 2025 all 106 million Filipinos would have a PhilSys ID number assigned to them. By that time PhilSys ID number should be issued to newborn Filipino citizens.

According to schedule, pilot-testing started on September 2, 2019, with a small number of individuals: Department of Social Welfare and Development (DSWD)-beneficiaries and personnel of the PSA & National Economic and Development Authority (NEDA). The testing was planned continue until July 2020, when registration is slated to be expanded and opened to the public, with overseas registry starting mid-2021. "The first part will involve biometric and demographic capturing processes. Once the system is stable, operations will expand to cover select groups from nearby regions, Regions III and IV-A, based on different geographical typologies. Set to begin in May 2020, the PSA planned to extend the pilot registration process to test the end-to-end system which essentially involves deduplication, generation of unique PhilSys Numbers (PSN), and card printing and issuance." According to new estimates, 100% registry of all Filipinos should be reached by mid-2022.

The schedule was impacted by the COVID-19 pandemic, and registration was rescheduled to begin towards the fourth quarter of 2020. Registration began in October 2020, with 32 provinces prioritized.

== Implementation ==
As of 19 September 2024, a total of 90,017,181 Filipinos had registered for the Philippine Identification System, reaching approximately 97.8 % of the PSA’s 92‑million target for the year.

== Reception ==
Proponents of the PhilSys assert that a national identification system would be beneficial in easing access to government services, reducing red tape, and law enforcement. Jamael Jacob, director of Ateneo de Manila University's Data Protection Office, stated that a universal ID system can make the delivery and access to public services more efficient and would aid in contact tracing individuals during outbreaks of disease.

=== Design flaws and distribution delays ===
Upon the implementation of the PhilSys Act, the Philippine Statistics Authority drew flak on social media due to delayed delivery of the national ID cards, some of which also suffered from typographical errors (usually misspelled names), unflattering photos, and fading of the print after a short period. Senator Ping Lacson himself admitted his card took nearly a year before it was delivered and his birth date on it was incorrect. In response, the PSA said it would cost ₱135 those who wish their IDs rectified and such. In addition, the PSA introduced a digital version of the national IDs (ePhilID) that persons could utilize as they await the delivery of their physical IDs.

Surigao del Norte 2nd district representative Ace Barbers called the national ID "useless", having received a bulk of complaints from cardholders who said their IDs were not being honored because they do not bear their signatures. The PSA has called on banks to accept national IDs even without signatures, saying that the QR codes embedded on the cards (and its electronic counterparts) should serve as an authenticating mechanism in lieu of handwritten signatures, which can be easily forged.

=== Privacy concerns ===
Privacy concerns surrounding PhilSys were also raised by Filipinos over social media, fearing that the national ID system and the collected data may be vulnerable to security breaches in light of the Commission on Elections data breach during the 2016 Philippine general election. Jamael Jacob also warns against the possibility that data collected for the ID system may be used as for other purposes outside of the intended purpose.

The Communist Party of the Philippines has condemned the passage of the PhilSys Act, expressing fears that the national ID system may be used for "mass surveillance and criminal profiling". In a statement, detained Senator Leila de Lima expressed her distrust in the Duterte administration not to "interfere in the private lives of Filipinos" and further "destroy what remaining rights that Filipinos still have under Duterte's regime".

In response, Dennis Mapa assured that all data would be kept secure under the provisions of the Data Privacy Act of 2012 and the PhilSys Act, with safeguards on how this data will be accessed and shared. Both Drilon and Lacson also argued that the information to be gathered for the identity card is already present in other government-issued IDs such as voters' IDs, passports, and driver's licenses, and as such, would be no different to the data that would be collected for PhilSys.

== See also ==
- Philippine passport
- Unified Multi-Purpose ID
- List of national identity card policies by country
