= Mongolian nationality law =

Nationality Act of Mongolia

State Great Khural
- Long title: Law of Mongolia on Nationality
- Enacted by: Government of Mongolia
- Signed by: Gombojav J., Deputy Speaker of the State Great Khural
- Signed: 5 June 1995
- Commenced: 15 July 1995
- Status: Current legislation

The Mongolian nationality law is a nationality law that determines who is a citizen of Mongolia.

== Current law ==
Current citizenship law is guided by the 1992 Constitution of Mongolia and the Law of Mongolia on Nationality. The most recent amendments to the act was made on 7 December 2000.

From the Nationality Act of Mongolia:

Article 6. Basis for receiving Mongolian nationality

A person shall become Mongolian citizen through one of the following ways:

1. by being born in Mongolia,
2. by obtaining Mongolian nationality,
3. by reinstating their Mongolian nationality,
4. through international treaties and conventions Mongolia has ratified or is a signatory to.

Article 7. A child receiving Mongolian nationality

1. If both parents are Mongolian nationals, the child shall receive Mongolian nationality regardless of where they were born.
2. A child, whose one parent is a Mongolian national and the other parent is a foreign national, shall receive Mongolian nationality if born in Mongolia. Otherwise, the nationality shall be issued based on written agreement by the parents.
3. A child, whose one parent is a Mongolian national and the other parent is a stateless person, shall receive Mongolian nationality regardless of where they were born.
4. A child living in Mongolia, whose both parents are unidentified (missing), shall receive Mongolian nationality.
5. A child born in Mongolia to foreign parents with valid residency permits can receive Mongolian nationality voluntarily at the age of 16.
6. A child with Mongolian nationality adopted to foreign nationals shall retain their nationality until the age of 16.

=== Obtaining the citizenship ===
If both of the parents of a child are Mongolian – irrespective of where the child is born – the child automatically receives Mongolian citizenship. A child born to one Mongolian parent inside of Mongolia is also considered Mongolian.

A child who is within the territory of Mongolia whose parents are not identified is a Mongolian citizen.

From the Nationality Act of Mongolia:

Article 8. Obtaining Mongolian nationality

1. A foreign national or a stateless person can obtain Mongolian nationality legally.

Article 9. Conditions for obtaining Mongolian nationality

1. The following conditions must be met before obtaining Mongolian nationality:
  1. have a source of income or capacity to live;
  2. have adequate knowledge of the culture, the official language and the Constitution of Mongolia and have permanently lived in Mongolia for more than five years upon the day before the application;
  3. have met additional conditions put forward by the authority for immigration and foreign nationals of Mongolia in accordance with the sub-clauses 1 and 2;
  4. have not intentionally committed a crime during the period of time stated in the sub-clause 2;
  5. do not pose a threat to Mongolian diplomatic relations with the home country of the person.
2. Clause 1.1 of this article is irrelevant to underaged children and persons who are reinstating their Mongolian nationality under Article 14.
3. A person who has accomplished an achievement of outstanding benefit to Mongolia or has a profession of significant importance to Mongolia, or has (or capable of) an exceptional accomplishment in a scientific field can obtain Mongolian nationality by the decree of the President. Clauses 1.1 and 1.2 of this article are irrelevant to persons described in this clause.

== Acquisition ==
Foreigners may apply for citizenship either through the office of the President or through a Mongolian embassy. One must renounce their former nationalities in order to acquire Mongolian nationality.

Mongolians who are adopted by foreigners have "the right to choose his/her own nationality" according to the Family Law of Mongolia, Chapter 7, Article 58.9.

== History ==
During the Mongolian People's Republic, citizenship was determined by the nationality of the parents. A child with at least one parent with Mongolian citizenship automatically received the nationality of the Mongolian People's Republic, regardless of where they were born. Multiple citizenship was also accepted. The statute was agreed upon by the Mongolian Council of Ministers on 30 December 1974, and detailed further by an Instruction on the Fulfillment of the Statute on 11 April 1975.

== Loss of citizenship ==
Citizenship can be renounced through the President's Office. However, the Mongolian government has been historically unwilling to let educated Mongolians renounce their citizenship.

The involuntary loss of citizenship -- exile -- is banned under the constitution. Mongolian nationals abroad can receive consular assistance government services through embassies and diplomatic missions of Mongolia.

== Dual Citizenship ==
Dual citizenship is not granted by the Mongolian government.

Article 4. Non-recognition of dual citizenship

1. A citizen of Mongolia shall not be recognized as a citizen of a foreign country at the same time.

2. If a foreign citizen wants to become a citizen of Mongolia, he / she must renounce the citizenship of that country. If the law of a foreign country provides for the loss

of citizenship by becoming a citizen of another country, it is not required to renounce the citizenship of that country, and a certificate from the relevant authority must

be obtained.

If an international treaty on dual citizenship to which Mongolia is a party establishes procedures other than those specified in the legislation on citizenship, the provisions of the international treaty shall prevail.

== Travel freedom ==
Visa requirements for Mongolian citizens

In 2016, Mongolian citizens had visa-free or visa on arrival access to 58 countries and territories, ranking the Mongolian passport 81st in the world according to the Visa Restrictions Index.
