= Visa policy of San Marino =

Policy on permits required to enter San Marino

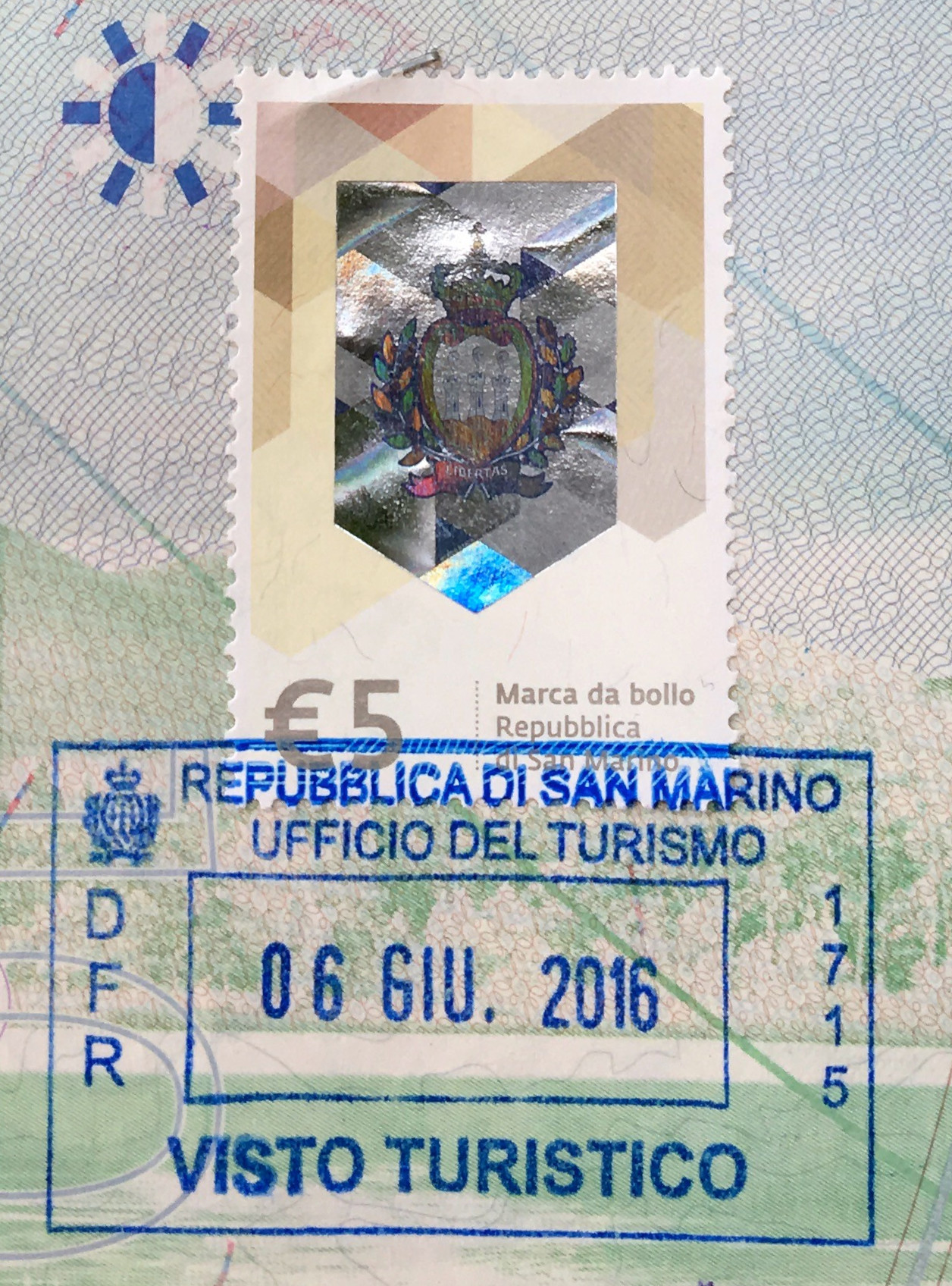
A souvenir passport stamp

San Marino is not a member of the European Union or European Economic Area. However, it maintains an open border with Italy. Since San Marino is only accessible via Italy, entrance by land or sea is not possible without entering the Schengen Area first, so Schengen visa rules apply de facto. A small airport exists within the territory of San Marino which hosts regular charter flights. Foreign visitors (except Italy) staying more than 90 days in San Marino must obtain a permit from the government.

== Bilateral agreements ==
However, San Marino signs independent visa-free agreements which are of symbolic value for foreign citizens but do have effect on San Marino passport holders. San Marino has signed such visa-free agreements with Argentina, Austria, Belgium, Bulgaria, China, Croatia, Cyprus, Czech Republic, Finland, Hungary, Japan, Kazakhstan, Kenya, Latvia, Lithuania, Morocco, Portugal, Romania, Russia, Slovenia, South Korea and the United Kingdom for ordinary passport holders. In addition, agreements were also signed with Azerbaijan, Gambia, Moldova, Eswatini, Tunisia, Turkey, and Uganda for diplomatic and service passport holders.

== Passport stamps ==
When visiting San Marino, there is no passport control, hence no passport stamps are issued. However, visitors may get souvenir passport stamps at a state tourism office, which is considered by the authorities to be the official stamp.

== Residence ==
Foreign visitors (including EU citizens) looking to stay for more than 90 days require a residence permit.

However, San Marino has established bilateral residence agreements with Italy regulating the entry, stay and residence of their nationals. Under these agreements, San Marino and Italian nationals can enjoy equal treatment in residency, employment, and professional activities, comparable to the rights granted to EU nationals. Nationals can work in both salaried and self-employed capacities, and are allowed to invest in and manage businesses in the host country. Public sector jobs are primarily reserved for nationals, but San Marino permits Italian nationals to apply if positions remain unfilled by Sammarinese. Family reunification is also allowed, and protections against expulsion are in place, except for reasons related to public order, security, or public health.

== See also ==
- Visa requirements for Sammarinese citizens
- Visa policy of the Schengen Area
- List of diplomatic missions of San Marino
- Foreign relations of San Marino
- Tourism in San Marino
