= San Marino identity card =

National identity card of San Marino

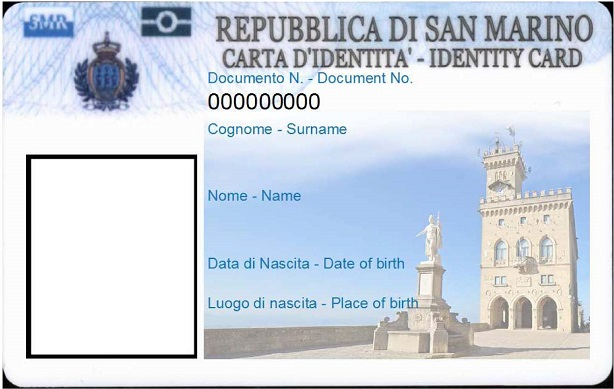

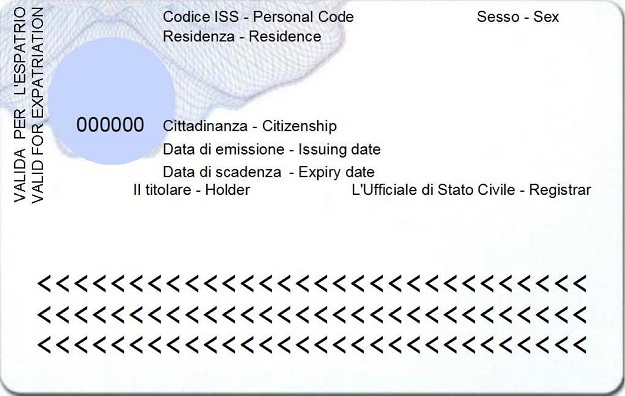
- Type: Compulsory identity card
- Issued by: San Marino
- Purpose: Proof of identity
- Valid in: EU & EFTA states (except Bulgaria, Cyprus, Czech Republic, Hungary, Iceland, Ireland, Latvia and Sweden) (Andorra) (Monaco) (Vatican City) European microstates Albania; Bosnia and Herzegovina; Faroe Islands (France) French overseas territories Gibraltar; Kosovo; Moldova; Montenegro; Montserrat (max. 14 days)
- Eligibility: San Marino citizenship
- Expiration: 5 years, 3 years for children under 6 y.o.

The San Marino identity card is an identification document of the Republic of San Marino, since January 2017 the electronic identity card has been in use. Any citizen or resident can get an identification card. Sanmarinese citizens will get indication of citizenship and "valid for expatriation" on the card.

== History ==
The issue of the San Marino identity card was governed only by the law of 20 January 1963, n.3, the law provided that the identity cards should no longer be issued by the Gendarmerie but by the Directorate of Civil Status Services and those still present. they had to be replaced within the year; the identity card had a value of three years for San Marino citizens and one year for resident foreign citizens. The law 25 January 1990, n. 12 the identity card is also issued to resident foreigners who have reached the age of fourteen and a file is set up at the headquarters of the Gendarmerie and the duration of the identity card passes to five years. With the law of June 17, 2004, n.83, the data of the file are entered in the computer database of the Civil Status Office and transmitted to the Gendarmerie The Delegated Decree of August 16, 2016, n.105 provides for the issuance of the electronic identity card (CIE) for all San Marino citizens and for foreigners residing in the Republic, the signature is not required for children under 12 and the document is valid for five years and three years for children under six years of age, the Decree was ratified on January 18, 2017.

== Features ==
The new San Marino identity card is electronic and biometric. It is made of plastic and is the size of a credit card. On the front there is the digital image which is also replicated laterally, and the data are expressed in Italian and English: surname, name, nationality, place and date of birth, date of issue and expiry, card number, gender, card number and personal number. On the back there is also a holographic micro-print.

== Obtainment ==
It is necessary to go with the expired identity card or an identification document to the Civil Status Office - Demographic and Electoral Services of Borgo Maggiore and pay 30 euros, for children under 6 it has a cost of 15 euros.

== Identity card as a travel document ==
The San Marino identity card also functions as a travel document in the countries and territories listed to the right in infobox.

== See also ==
- San Marino passport
- Visa requirements for San Marino citizens
