= San Marino nationality law =

San Marino Citizenship Act

Grand and General Council
- Long title: An Act relating to San Marino citizenship
- Enacted by: Government of San Marino
- Status: Amended

San Marino nationality law is contained in the provisions of the Law on Citizenship (2000) which was amended in 2004, 2016, 2019, 2021 and 2026 and in the relevant provisions of the San Marino Constitution. A person may be a citizen of San Marino through birth, descent or through naturalisation.

== Acquisition of citizenship ==
=== At birth ===
Any child born within the territory of San Marino is automatically a citizen of San Marino if both parents were citizens of San Marino. In the case of only one parent being a citizen of San Marino, 12 months after the child turns 18, both of the parents must declare that the child wishes to choose the citizenship of the parent that is a citizen of San Marino.

Citizenship by birth can also happen if:

- The parents of the child born in San Marino are stateless.
- The child is found abandoned where both parents are unknown.

=== By descent ===
Any child born outside of San Marino has a claim to citizenship if at least one of his/her parents are a citizen of San Marino.

The children of all San Marino citizens of 18 years of age, who permanently reside within the territory of San Marino for a minimum of 10 years, are eligible for citizenship.

=== By naturalisation ===
Anyone with a valid residence permit who has lived in San Marino for 20 years can apply for naturalisation through the Grand and General Council provided they:

- Have never been convicted of a criminal offence in San Marino or abroad.
- Have never received a prison sentence of more than 1 year.

The period of residence is reduced to 10 years for spouses of Sammarinese citizens.

== Loss of citizenship ==
=== Voluntary ===
Voluntary renunciation of San Marino Citizenship is allowed under law provided it does not render the person stateless.

=== Involuntary ===
People who became citizens of San Marino through naturalisation may have their citizenship revoked if it was obtained by fraud, false representation or the concealment of any material fact.

== Dual citizenship ==
San Marino previously required the renunciation of any previous citizenship to naturalise, but in 2026 the law was amended to fully legalize dual citizenship.

== Travel freedom of Sammarinese citizens ==
Visa requirements for Sammarinese citizens San Marino Freedom of movement Visa-free Visa available both on arrival or online Visa on arrival eVisa Visa required

== See also ==
- San Marino passport
- Jus soli
- Jus sanguinis
