= San Marino–Turkey relations =

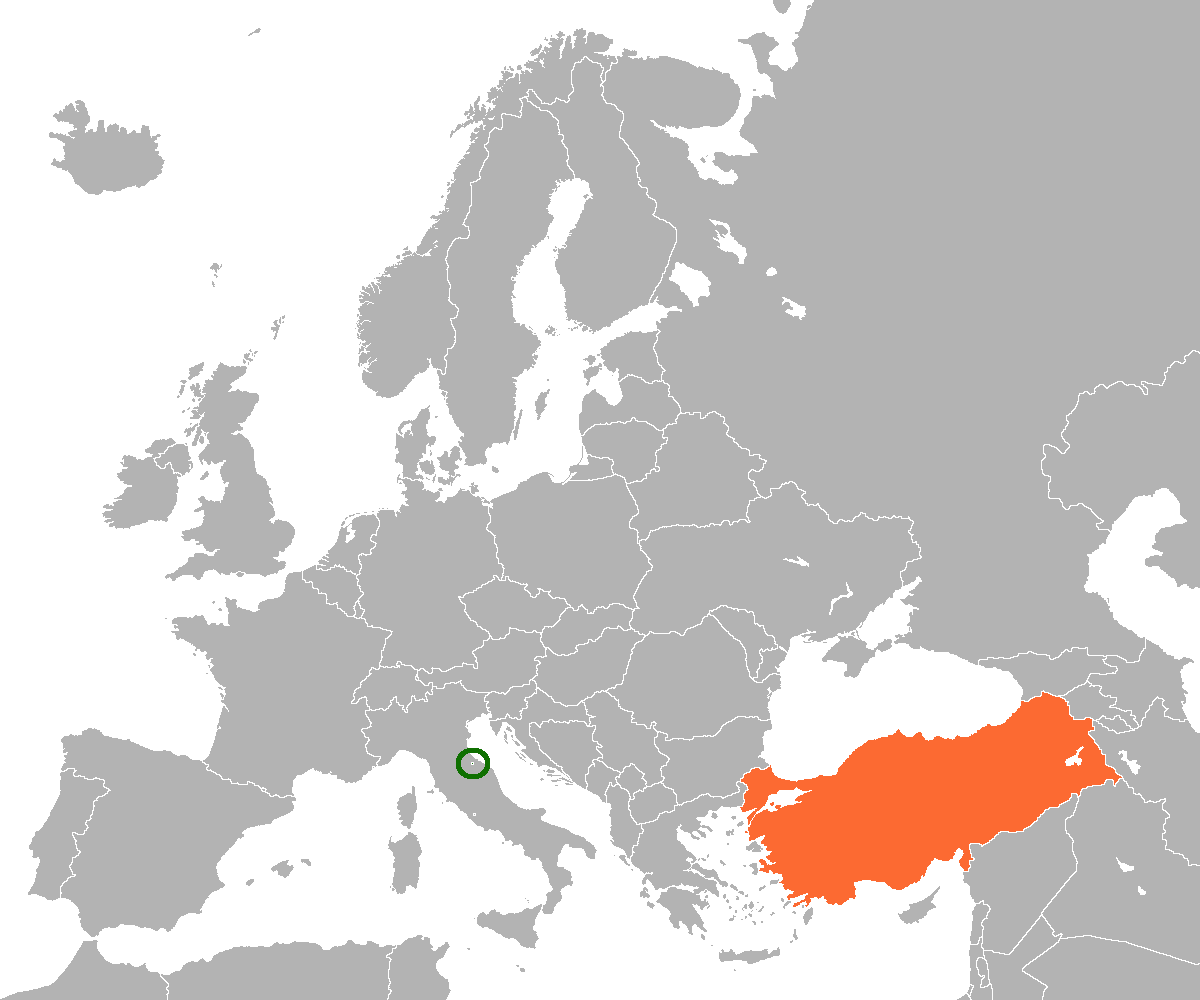
- San Marino: Turkey

San Marino and Turkey established bilateral relations in 1861. The two countries mainly enjoyed friendly relations. Turkey does not have an embassy in San Marino, but the Turkish ambassador to Italy in Rome is also accredited to San Marino.

== Diplomatic relations ==
In the late 1920s and 1930s, Turkey considered Fascist Italy as the main potential aggressor.

On March 19, 1935, Mussolini outlined his foreign policy: "The historical objectives of Italy have two names: Asia and Africa...These objectives are justified by geography and history. Of all the great Western Powers of Europe, the nearest to Africa and Asia is Italy...There is no question of territorial conquests...but of a natural expansion which will lead to a close cooperation between Italy and the nations of the Near and Middle East...Italy can do this: her position on the Mediterranean, a sea which is resuming its historic function as a link between East and West, gives her this right and imposes on her this duty.

Mindful of San Marino’s consistent alignment with Italian foreign policy, Turkey was deterred from befriending San Marino because of Mussolini’s territorial ambitions along the Anatolian coast and the establishment of a naval base on Leros, in the Dodecanese archipelago.

Bilateral relations improved considerably when San Marino declared neutrality after the surrender of Italy.

== Economic relations ==
- Trade volume between the two countries was US$2.56 million in 2010 (Turkish exports/imports: 1.78/0.78 million USD).

== See also ==
- Foreign relations of San Marino
- Foreign relations of Turkey
- Italy–Turkey relations
