= San Marino–United Kingdom relations =

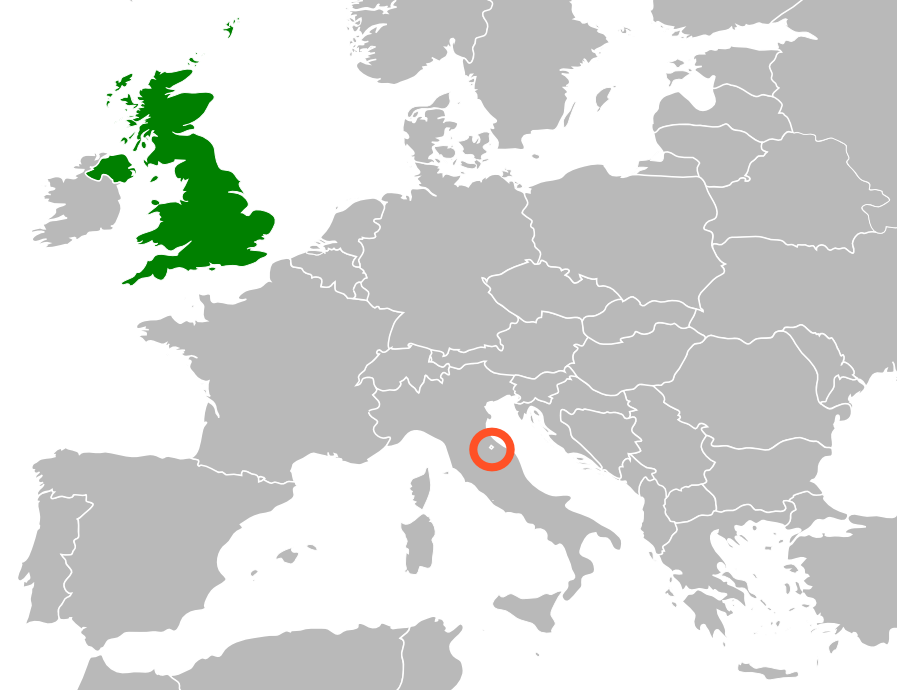

- United Kingdom: San Marino

San Marino–United Kingdom relations date back to 1899, when the United Kingdom and San Marino signed an extradition treaty.

== History ==
In 1899, the United Kingdom and San Marino signed an extradition treaty and a British consul general was appointed to San Marino in 1900.

During the Second World War, after neighbouring Italy declared war on the United Kingdom, San Marino was reported to have joined Italy in declaring war on Britain. However, the Sammarinese government later denied these reports. Then, when Italy surrendered, San Marino declared neutrality. On 26 June 1944, the Allied Forces under British command erroneously bombed San Marino in the belief that it was harbouring German forces. On 21 September 1944, San Marino declared war on Germany.

In 2023 the two countries signed a double taxation convention.

== Reparations ==
At UN-sponsored talks between 17 and 22 July 1961, the British government agreed to pay San Marino reparations to the sum of £80,000 for their part in the erroneous wartime bombing of the republic after the latter had filed a claim for 732 million lire.

== Diplomacy ==
His Majesty's Ambassador to the Italian Republic is accredited as Non-Resident Ambassador to San Marino and the UK Embassy in Rome also covers San Marino. San Marino appoints a non-resident ambassador to the UK, currently a position held by Dario Galassi since 2023. The only diplomatic representation with a physical presence in the UK is the Honorary Consulate, where the current honorary consul is Maurizio Bragagni.

The Foreign Minister of San Marino, Luca Beccari, has visited the UK on multiple occasions, as have the various Captains Regent of the country.

The British All Party Parliamentary Group on San Marino has paid visit to the country, as has Theresa May shortly after leaving office as Prime Minister.

== See also ==
- Foreign relations of the United Kingdom
- Foreign relations of San Marino
- Britons in San Marino
