= Foreign relations of San Marino =

San Marino is an independent and sovereign member of the international community. It maintains an extensive diplomatic network relative to its diminutive size, as well as an active foreign policy and international presence.

== International organizations ==
Among other international organizations, San Marino is a full member of the following international organizations:

- United Nations
- International Court of Justice
- International Labour Organization (ILO)
- United Nations Educational, Scientific and Cultural Organization (UNESCO)
- International Monetary Fund (IMF)
- World Health Organization (WHO)
- World Tourism Organization (WTO)
- Council of Europe
- International Committee of the Red Cross
- International Criminal Court (ICC)
- International Institution for the Unification of Private Law (UNIDROIT)

It also cooperates with UNICEF and the United Nations High Commissioner for Refugees and has official relations with the European Union.

From May 10 until November 6, 1990, San Marino held the semi-annual presidency of the Committee of Ministers of the Council of Europe. The second San Marino Chairmanship of the Committee of Ministers of the Council of Europe was from November 2006 until May 2007.

== Diplomatic relations ==
List of countries which San Marino maintains diplomatic relations with: (consular relations with Haiti)

#	Country	Date
–	Holy See	April 1926
1	France	15 May 1965
2	Italy	1970
3	Romania	18 May 1974
4	Albania	21 June 1976
5	Iran	30 July 1976
6	Iceland	28 October 1978
7	Democratic Republic of the Congo	14 May 1984
8	Belgium	26 March 1985
–	Sovereign Military Order of Malta	4 March 1986
9	Austria	2 April 1987
10	Sweden	13 December 1988
11	Egypt	27 April 1989
12	Czech Republic	15 April 1991
13	Hungary	24 May 1991
14	China	18 June 1991
15	Slovenia	14 January 1992
16	Spain	29 April 1992
17	Brunei	10 June 1992
18	Jordan	13 July 1992
19	Cyprus	20 October 1992
20	Denmark	3 November 1992
21	Netherlands	1992
22	Slovakia	1 January 1993
23	Croatia	11 February 1993
24	South Africa	30 April 1993
25	Georgia	23 July 1993
26	Russia	30 September 1993
27	Argentina	6 October 1994
28	Poland	14 November 1994
29	Ireland	13 January 1995
30	Portugal	27 March 1995
31	Switzerland	10 July 1995
32	Finland	17 July 1995
33	Malta	17 July 1995
34	Australia	13 September 1995
35	Germany	15 September 1995
36	Israel	30 October 1995
37	Ukraine	30 October 1995
38	Andorra	30 November 1995
39	Japan	27 May 1996
40	Cuba	28 May 1996
41	Bosnia and Herzegovina	21 November 1996
42	Norway	11 December 1996
43	Canada	24 November 1997
44	United Kingdom	18 November 1998
45	Uruguay	22 September 1999
46	Libya	20 October 1999
47	Greece	22 November 1999
48	Latvia	7 March 2000
49	Bulgaria	17 April 2000
50	South Korea	25 September 2000
51	Luxembourg	8 February 2001
52	Guatemala	14 February 2002
53	Seychelles	14 March 2002
54	Colombia	15 April 2002
55	Azerbaijan	19 April 2002
56	Algeria	13 February 2003
57	Lithuania	6 March 2003
58	Paraguay	3 April 2003
59	Philippines	3 April 2003
60	Serbia	3 April 2003
61	Qatar	3 May 2003
62	Thailand	12 September 2003
63	Estonia	15 October 2003
64	Brazil	20 November 2003
65	Panama	22 January 2004
66	Malaysia	29 January 2004
67	Kazakhstan	20 September 2004
68	Kyrgyzstan	20 September 2004
69	Moldova	28 September 2004
70	Morocco	14 October 2004
71	Gambia	29 October 2004
72	Yemen	22 February 2005
73	North Korea	14 March 2005
74	Belize	15 March 2005
75	Peru	4 July 2005
76	Nepal	10 August 2005
77	Turkey	12 October 2005
78	Eritrea	28 October 2005
79	Singapore	9 December 2005
80	Tunisia	17 December 2005
81	Armenia	21 March 2006
82	Monaco	26 March 2006
83	Pakistan	12 April 2006
84	Senegal	17 October 2006
85	Bahamas	22 November 2006
86	United States	22 November 2006
87	El Salvador	18 January 2007
88	Montenegro	29 March 2007
89	Mongolia	30 March 2007
90	Mexico	22 May 2007
91	Vietnam	6 July 2007
92	Mauritania	16 November 2007
93	Costa Rica	19 February 2008
94	Ghana	5 November 2008
95	Belarus	9 February 2009
96	Ecuador	26 March 2009
97	Angola	30 March 2009
98	Saudi Arabia	31 March 2009
99	United Arab Emirates	6 July 2009
100	Chile	11 July 2009
101	Nicaragua	2 October 2009
102	Lebanon	13 November 2009
103	Lesotho	30 November 2010
104	Cambodia	12 April 2011
105	India	26 September 2011
106	Indonesia	26 September 2011
107	Timor-Leste	7 October 2011
108	Liechtenstein	21 October 2011
109	Iraq	9 December 2011
—	Kosovo	3 May 2012
110	Sri Lanka	7 June 2012
111	Fiji	15 March 2013
112	Tuvalu	19 March 2013
113	New Zealand	29 April 2013
114	Dominican Republic	1 October 2013
115	Honduras	16 December 2013
116	Maldives	24 April 2014
117	Venezuela	10 November 2014
118	Kuwait	17 December 2014
119	Bangladesh	31 May 2017
120	Ivory Coast	9 November 2017
121	Mauritius	20 April 2018
122	Tajikistan	3 August 2018
123	Federated States of Micronesia	25 September 2018
124	Saint Kitts and Nevis	25 September 2018
125	Vanuatu	25 September 2018
126	Palau	26 September 2018
127	Oman	26 September 2018
128	Republic of the Congo	27 September 2018
129	Ethiopia	7 November 2018
130	Antigua and Barbuda	12 December 2018
131	Laos	17 December 2018
132	Benin	22 January 2019
133	Guyana	17 February 2019
134	Samoa	28 February 2019
135	Togo	28 February 2019
136	Saint Vincent and the Grenadines	24 September 2019
137	Bahrain	25 September 2019
138	Bolivia	25 September 2019
139	Cape Verde	25 September 2019
140	North Macedonia	26 September 2019
141	Barbados	3 October 2019
142	Suriname	8 October 2019
143	Saint Lucia	7 February 2020
144	Jamaica	29 September 2020
145	Uganda	23 October 2020
146	Uzbekistan	6 February 2021
147	Kenya	12 May 2021
148	Dominica	2 August 2021
149	Kiribati	20 October 2021
150	Madagascar	1 February 2023
151	Malawi	8 December 2023
152	Burundi	27 September 2024
153	Marshall Islands	28 September 2024
154	Tonga	25 February 2025
155	Solomon Islands	4 April 2025
156	São Tomé and Príncipe	26 September 2025
157	Turkmenistan	7 November 2025
—	State of Palestine	23 February 2026
158	Trinidad and Tobago	24 September 2026
159	Namibia	26 September 2026

== UN Secretary General visits and remarks ==
On 31 March-1 April 2013, United Nations Secretary-General Ban Ki-moon was the official orator on the occasion of the newly elected Captains Regent. “Although this country is small, your importance to the United Nations stands as tall as Mount Titano,” the Secretary-General told the country's highest officials, the two Captains Regent, in reference to the country's 739 meter UNESCO World Heritage Site. Mr. Ban also noted that the country accepted five times as many refugees as its population during the Second World War, and praised its emphasis on protecting human rights. This was the second visit to San Marino by a UN Secretary General, the first having been by Boutrous Boutrous-Gali's visit in 1996.

== Multilateral relations ==
Organization	Formal Relations Began	Notes
European Union		See San Marino–European Union relations

== Bilateral relations ==
Country	Formal relations began on	Notes
Andorra	30 November 1995	Andorra is accredited to San Marino from its Ministry of Foreign Affairs based in Andorra la Vella.; San Marino does not have an accreditation to Andorra.
Armenia	21 March 2006	Armenia is accredited to San Marino from its embassy in Rome, Italy.; San Marino is accredited to Armenia from its Ministry of Foreign Affairs in San Marino.
Austria	2 April 1987	Austria is accredited to San Marino from its embassy in Rome, Italy and maintains an honorary consulate in the City of San Marino.; San Marino has an embassy in Vienna.
Azerbaijan	19 April 2002	Azerbaijan is accredited to San Marino from its embassy in Rome, Italy.; San Marino maintains an honorary consulate in Baku.
Belgium	26 March 1985	Belgium is accredited to San Marino from its embassy in Rome, Italy.; San Marino has an embassy in Brussels.
Bosnia and Herzegovina	21 November 1996	Bosnia and Herzegovina is accredited to San Marino from its embassy in Rome, Italy.; San Marino has an embassy in Sarajevo.
Bulgaria	17 April 2000	Bulgaria is accredited to San Marino from its embassy in Rome, Italy.; San Marino is accredited to Bulgaria from its Ministry of Foreign Affairs in San Marino.
Canada	24 November 1997	Canada is accredited to San Marino from its embassy in Rome, Italy.; San Marino is accredited to Canada from its Permanent Mission to the United Nations in New York City.
China	18 June 1991	See China–San Marino relations: China is accredited to San Marino from its embassy in Rome, Italy.; San Marino is accredited to China from its Ministry of Foreign Affairs in San Marino.
Denmark	3 November 1992	Denmark is accredited to San Marino from its embassy in Rome, Italy.; San Marino is accredited to Denmark from its Ministry of Foreign Affairs in San Marino.
Finland	17 July 1995	Finland is accredited to San Marino from its embassy in Rome, Italy.; San Marino is accredited to Finland from its Ministry of Foreign Affairs in San Marino.
France	15 May 1965	France is accredited to San Marino from its embassy in Rome, Italy and maintains an honorary consulate in the City of San Marino.; San Marino has an embassy in Paris.
Germany	15 September 1995	See Germany–San Marino relations: Germany is accredited to San Marino from its embassy in Rome, Italy.; San Marino is accredited to Germany from its Ministry of Foreign Affairs in San Marino.
Greece	22 November 1999	Greece is accredited to San Marino from its embassy in Rome, Italy.; San Marino is accredited to Greece from its Ministry of Foreign Affairs in San Marino.
Holy See	April 1926	Holy See has an Apostolic Nunciature in the City of San Marino.; San Marino has an embassy in Rome to the Holy See.
Italy	1970	See Italy–San Marino relations: Italy has an embassy in the City of San Marino.; San Marino has an embassy in Rome.
Indonesia	26 September 2011	Indonesia is accredited to San Marino from its embassy in Rome, Italy.; San Marino had an embassy in Jakarta.
Japan	27 May 1996	Japan is accredited to San Marino from its embassy in Rome, Italy.; San Marino has an embassy in Tokyo.
Malta	17 July 1995	Malta is accredited to San Marino from its embassy in Rome, Italy.; San Marino is accredited to Malta from its Ministry of Foreign Affairs in San Marino.
Monaco	26 March 2006	Monaco is accredited to San Marino from its embassy in Rome, Italy.; San Marino is accredited to Monaco from its Permanent Mission to the Council of Europe in Strasbourg, France.
Mexico	22 May 2007	Mexico is accredited to San Marino from its embassy in Rome, Italy, and maintains an honorary consulate in the City of San Marino.; San Marino is accredited to Mexico from its Permanent Mission to the United Nations in New York City.
Netherlands	1992	Netherlands is accredited to San Marino from its embassy in Rome, Italy.; San Marino is accredited to Netherlands from its Ministry of Foreign Affairs in San Marino.
Poland	14 November 1994	Poland is accredited to San Marino from its embassy in Rome, Italy.; San Marino is accredited to Poland from its Ministry of Foreign Affairs in San Marino.
Romania	18 May 1974	Romania is accredited to San Marino from its embassy in Rome, Italy.; San Marino is accredited to Romania from its Ministry of Foreign Affairs in San Marino.
Russia	30 September 1993	Russia is accredited to San Marino from its embassy in Rome, Italy.; San Marino is accredited to Russia from its embassy in Rome, Italy.; On 1 March 2023, the Grand and General Council of San Marino authorised the country's government to take sanctions against Russia for the invasion of Ukraine. Russia has included San Marino in an Unfriendly List.
South Korea	25 September 2000	San Marino opened an Honorary Consulate General in Seoul in February 2003.; South Korea is accredited to San Marino from its embassy in Rome, Italy.; San Marino–South Korea relations
Spain	29 April 1992	San Marino has an embassy in Madrid.; Spain is accredited to San Marino from its embassy in Rome, Italy.
Switzerland	10 July 1995	San Marino is accredited to Switzerland from its Permanent Mission to the United Nations in Geneva.; Switzerland is accredited to San Marino from its embassy in Rome, Italy.
Turkey	12 October 2005	See San Marino–Turkey relations: San Marino is accredited to Turkey from its Ministry of Foreign Affairs in San Marino.; Turkey is accredited to San Marino from its embassy in Rome, Italy.
Ukraine	30 October 1995	San Marino is accredited to Ukraine from its Ministry of Foreign Affairs in San Marino.; Ukraine is accredited to San Marino from its embassy in Rome, Italy.
United Kingdom	18 November 1998	See San Marino–United Kingdom relations San Marino established diplomatic relations with the United Kingdom on 18 November 1998.: San Marino does not maintain an embassy in the United Kingdom.; The United Kingdom is not accredited to San Marino through an embassy; the UK develops relations through its embassy in Rome, Italy.; Both countries share common membership of the Council of Europe, European Court of Human Rights, the International Criminal Court, OSCE, the United Nations, and the World Health Organization. Bilaterally the two countries have a Double Taxation Convention, and a Tax Information Exchange Agreement.
United States	22 November 2006	See San Marino–United States relations: San Marino is accredited to the United States from its Permanent Mission to the United Nations in New York City.; United States is accredited to San Marino from its embassy in Rome, Italy.; United States was the first non-European state recognizing official diplomatic relations with San Marino.

== See also ==
- List of diplomatic missions of San Marino
- List of diplomatic missions in San Marino
