= List of diplomatic missions in San Marino =

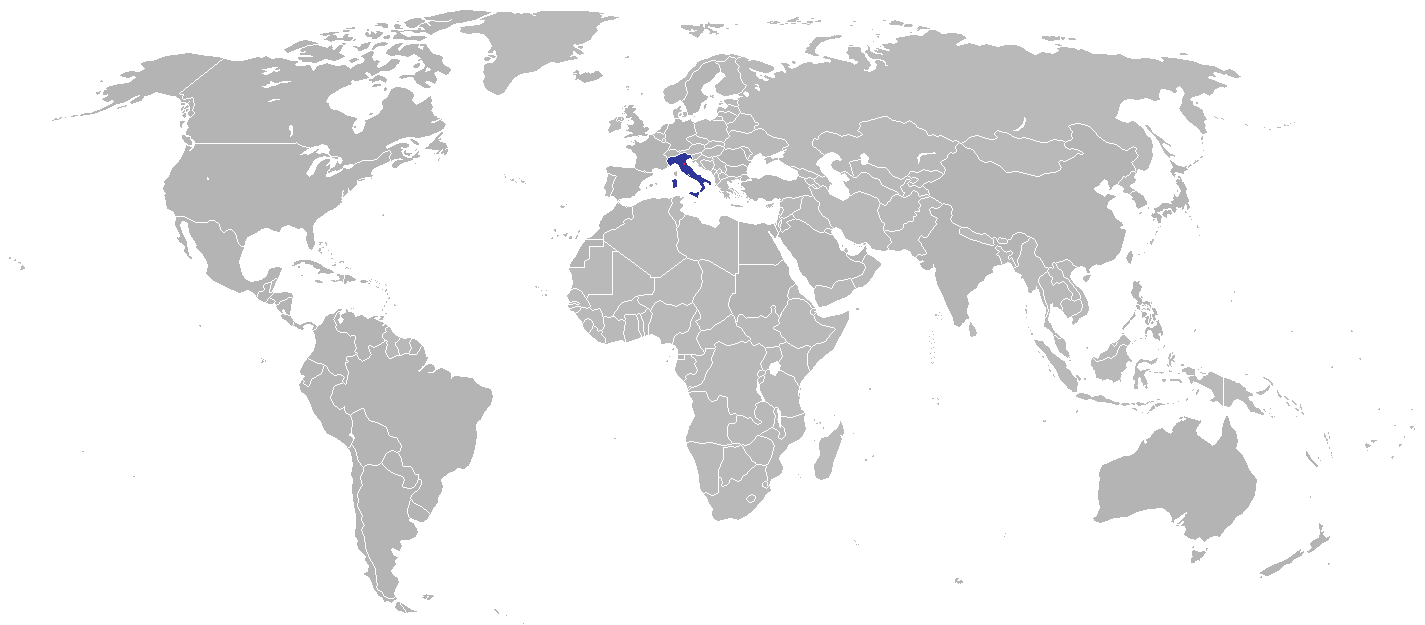
Diplomatic missions in San Marino

This article lists diplomatic missions resident in the City of San Marino. At present [when?], the microstate hosts three embassies. Many other countries have ambassadors accredited to San Marino, with most being resident in Rome. Some countries, while accrediting an ambassador from Rome, conduct day-to-day relations and provide consular services from consulates general in nearby Italian cities, such as Milan or Florence, or employ honorary consuls; at present [when?], there are eight honorary consulates located in San Marino: Austria, Bulgaria, Croatia, France, Japan, Mexico, Monaco and Romania.

== Embassies ==
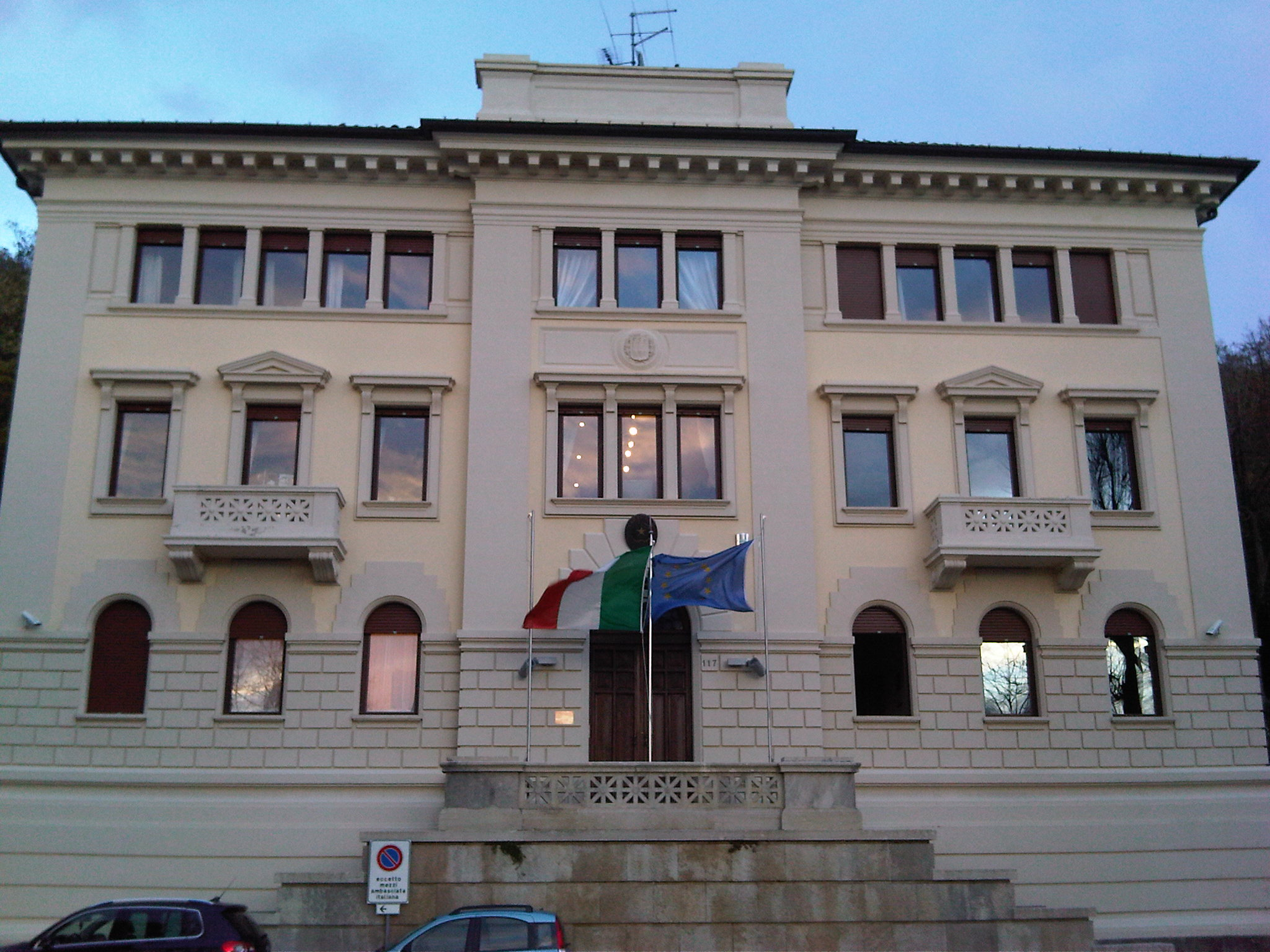
Italian Embassy in San Marino

Resident in City of San Marino unless otherwise noted

1. Holy See
2. Italy
3. Sovereign Military Order of Malta (Falciano)

== Honorary consulates in San Marino ==
1. Austria
2. Bulgaria
3. Croatia
4. France
5. Japan
6. Mexico
7. Monaco
8. Romania
9. Russia

== Non-resident embassies ==
(Resident in Rome unless otherwise noted)

1. Afghanistan
2. Albania
3. Algeria
4. Andorra (Andorra la Vella)
5. Angola
6. Argentina
7. Armenia
8. Australia
9. Austria
10. Azerbaijan
11. Bahrain
12. Bangladesh
13. Belarus
14. Belgium
15. Bolivia
16. Brazil
17. Bulgaria
18. Canada
19. Cape Verde
20. Chile
21. China
22. Colombia
23. Croatia
24. Cuba
25. Cyprus
26. Czechia
27. Denmark
28. Egypt
29. Estonia
30. Finland
31. France
32. Georgia
33. Germany
34. Guatemala
35. Guinea
36. Greece
37. Haiti
38. Honduras
39. Hungary
40. Iceland
41. India
42. Indonesia
43. Iraq
44. Ireland
45. Israel
46. Ivory Coast
47. Japan
48. Jordan
49. Kosovo
50. Kuwait
51. Kenya
52. Kyrgyzstan (Geneva)
53. Latvia
54. Lebanon
55. Lesotho
56. Libya
57. Lithuania
58. Luxembourg
59. Malaysia
60. Maldives (Geneva)
61. Mali
62. Malta
63. Mauritania
64. Mexico
65. Monaco
66. Montenegro
67. Morocco
68. Netherlands
69. New Zealand
70. Nicaragua
71. North Korea
72. Norway
73. Oman
74. Palestine
75. Pakistan
76. Panama
77. Peru
78. Philippines
79. Poland
80. Portugal
81. Qatar
82. Romania
83. Russia (Geneva)
84. Saudi Arabia
85. Serbia
86. Sierra Leone (Berlin)
87. Slovakia
88. Slovenia
89. South Africa
90. Republic of Korea
91. Spain
92. Sweden
93. Switzerland
94. Thailand
95. Togo (Paris)
96. Tunisia
97. Turkey
98. Turkmenistan
99. Timor-Leste (Geneva)
100. Tajikistan (Paris)
101. Tonga (Paris)
102. Uganda
103. Ukraine
104. United Arab Emirates
105. United Kingdom
106. United States
107. Uruguay
108. Uzbekistan
109. Venezuela
110. Vietnam
111. Yemen
112. Zambia
113. Zimbabwe

== Representatives ==
- South Ossetia

== See also ==
- List of diplomatic missions of San Marino

== Notes ==
^{1} South Ossetia unilaterally declared independence in 1992. Russia recognized the country in 2008. San Marino has not recognized the independence of South Ossetia. Nevertheless, both countries have informal relations.
