= San Marino passport =

Passport

Sammarinese passport
- Front cover of the Sammarinese biometric passport

- Visa requirements for San Marino citizens San Marino Freedom of movement Visa-free Visa available both on arrival or online Visa on arrival eVisa Visa required
- Type: Passport
- Issued by: Government of San Marino
- First issued: 12 October 2006 (current version)
- Purpose: Identification
- Eligibility: Sammarinese citizenship
- Expiration: 3 years (Child aged 0-2) 5 years (Child aged 3-13) 10 years (Child aged 14-17) 10 years (Adult aged 18+)
- Cost: EUR30.00 (Child aged 0-2) EUR50.00 (Child aged 3-13) EUR100.00 (Child aged 14-17) EUR100.00 (Adult aged 18+)

Sammarinese passports are passports issued to citizens of San Marino for international travel.

== Application procedure ==
Applications for a Sammarinese passport are lodged at the Passport Office in San Marino (or, in the case of citizens living overseas, at San Marino diplomatic missions) with the following documents:

- Completed passport application form
- Certificates of birth, citizenship, residence (or relevant self-certification form)
- Certificates of criminal record, pending suit and full civil capacity (to be issued by the Court without stamp duty)
- Two photographs, one of which certified by the Registrar of Vital Statistics (also in this case it is possible to use the self-certification form)

In general, the processing time for a passport application is 15 days.

The application fee is €100 for applicants aged over 14, €50 for applicants aged 3–14 and €30 for applicants aged under 3.

== Visa requirements ==
In 2024, citizens of San Marino had visa-free or visa on arrival access to 173 countries and territories, ranking the Sammarinese passport 16th in terms of travel freedom. It is currently (2024) one of 13 European "ordinary" passports to provide visa-free access to China, allowing the visa-free stay (90 days).

== See also ==
- Visa requirements for San Marino citizens
- San Marino identity card
