= List of diplomatic missions of San Marino =

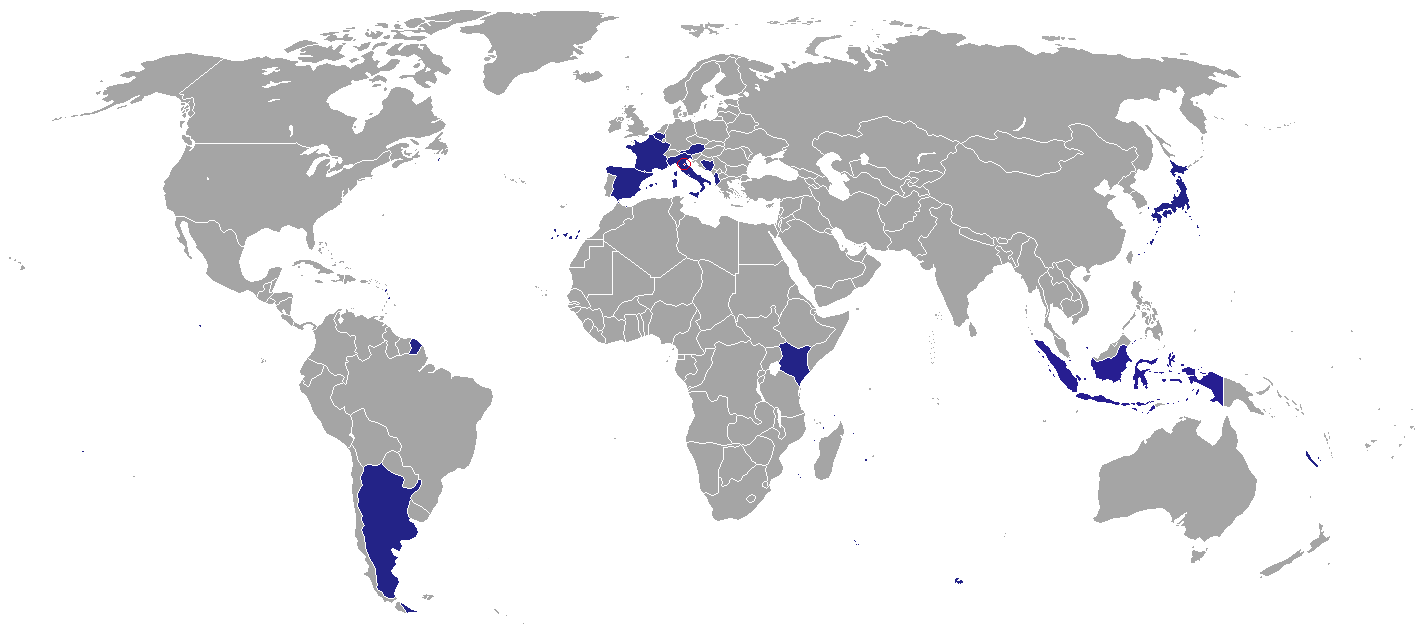
Diplomatic missions of San Marino at a resident ambassadorial level

The Republic of San Marino maintains a small network of diplomatic missions owing to its diminutive size.

Furthermore, San Marino maintains an extensive network of honorary consulates.

== Current missions ==
=== Africa ===
Host country	Host city	Mission	Concurrent accreditation	Ref.
Kenya	Nairobi	Embassy		

=== Americas ===
Host country	Host city	Mission	Concurrent accreditation	Ref.
Argentina	Buenos Aires	Embassy		

=== Asia ===
Host country	Host city	Mission	Concurrent accreditation	Ref.
Indonesia	Jakarta	Embassy	International Organizations: ASEAN	
Japan	Tokyo	Embassy		

=== Europe ===
Host country	Host city	Mission	Concurrent accreditation	Ref.
Albania	Tirana	Embassy		
Austria	Vienna	Embassy	Countries: Slovakia; International Organizations: Organization for Security and Co-operation in Europe; United Nations	
Belgium	Brussels	Embassy	Countries: Netherlands; Slovenia; International Organizations: European Union	
Bosnia Herzegovina	Sarajevo	Embassy		
France	Paris	Embassy	Countries: Luxembourg; International Organizations: UNESCO	
Holy See	Rome	Embassy		
Italy	Rome	Embassy	Countries: Romania; International Organizations: Food and Agriculture Organization	
Spain	Madrid	Embassy	Countries: Qatar	

=== Multilateral organizations ===
Organization	Host city	Host country	Mission	Concurrent accreditation	Ref.
Council of Europe	Strasbourg	France	Permanent Representative	Countries: Greece; United Arab Emirates; International Organizations: Organisation for the Prohibition of Chemical Weapons	
United Nations	Geneva	Switzerland	Permanent Mission	Countries: Russia; Switzerland	
United Nations	New York City	United States	Permanent Mission	Countries: Canada; Costa Rica; Guatemala; Mexico; United States	

== Gallery ==
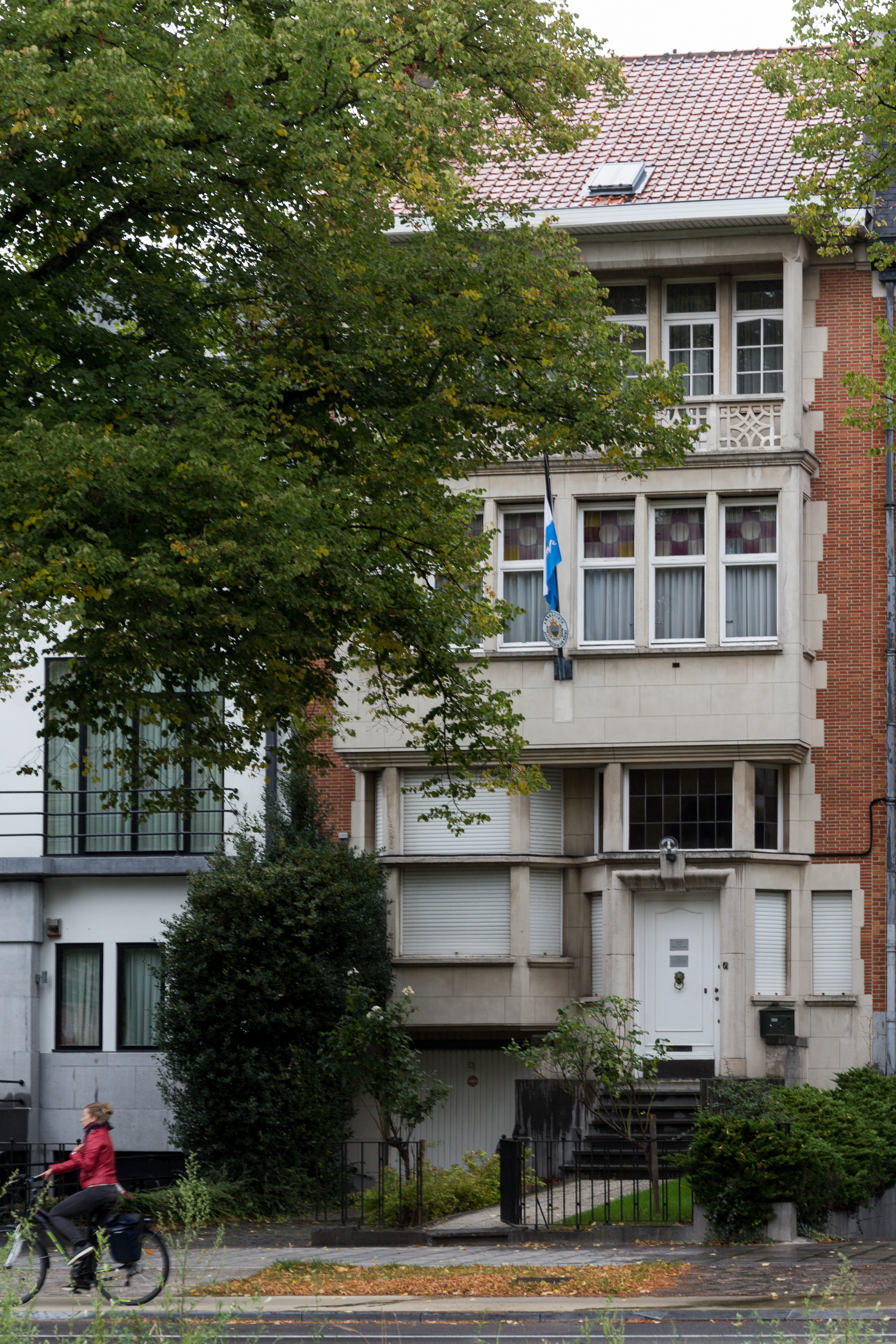
Embassy in Brussels

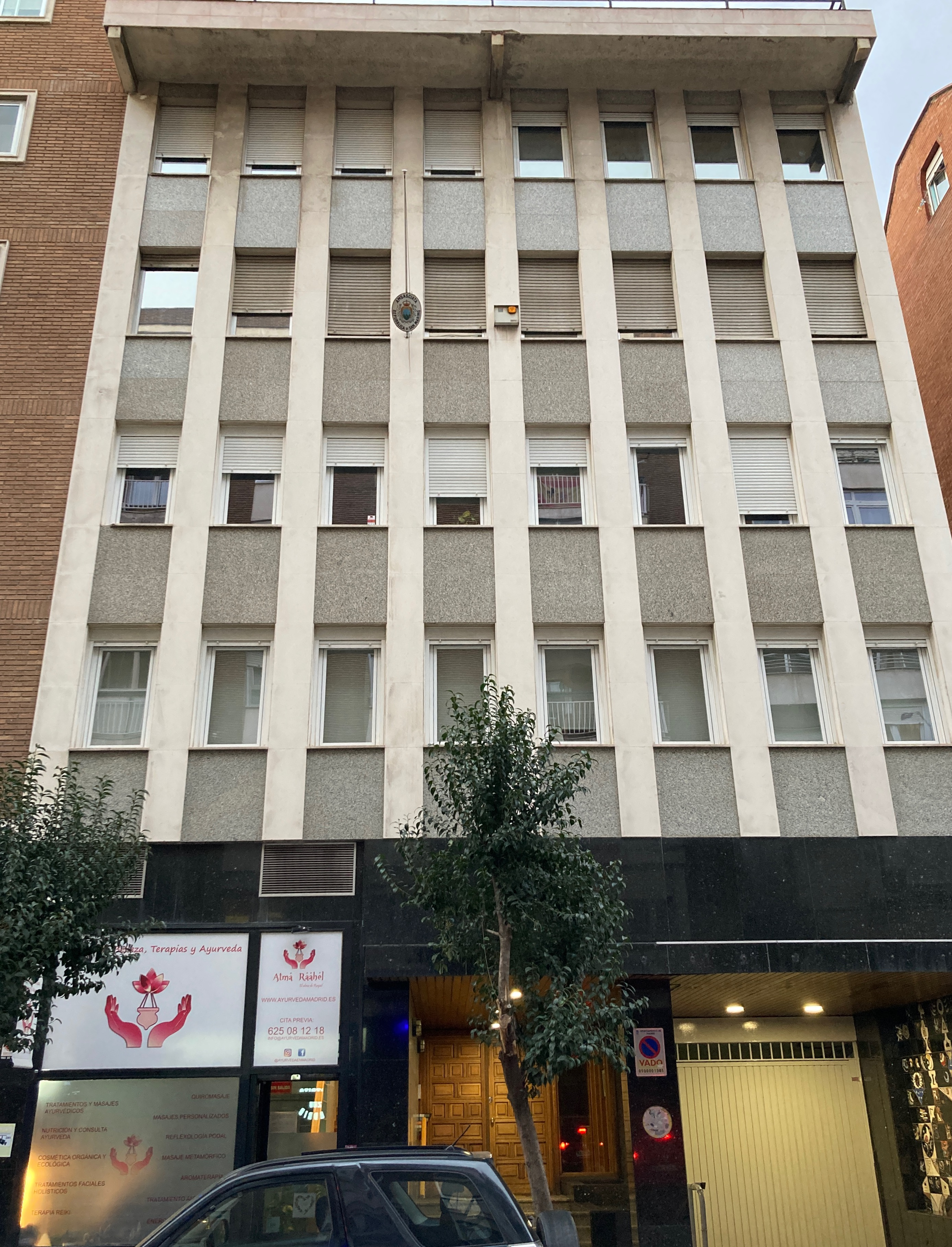
Building hosting the embassy in Madrid

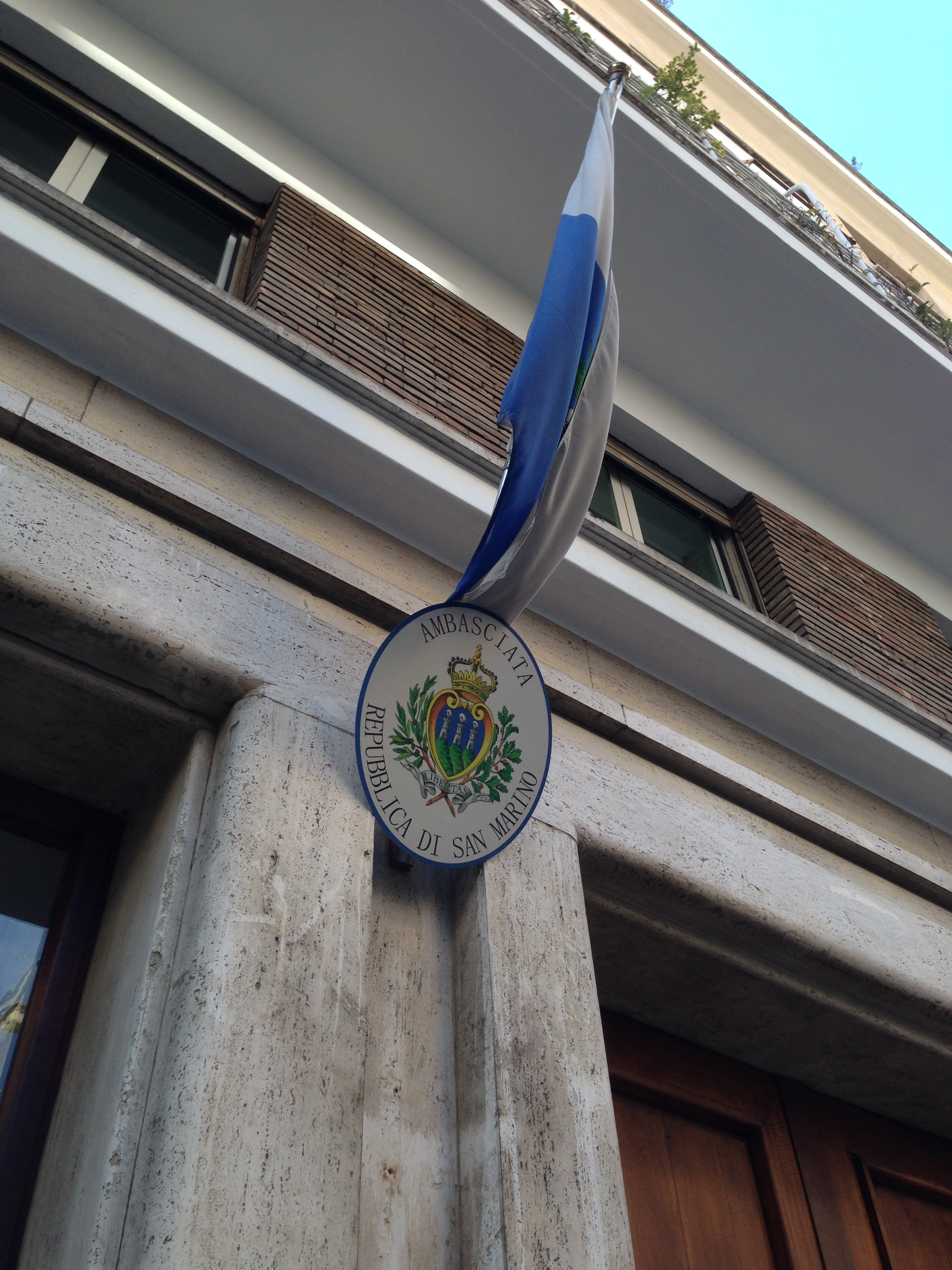
Embassy in Rome

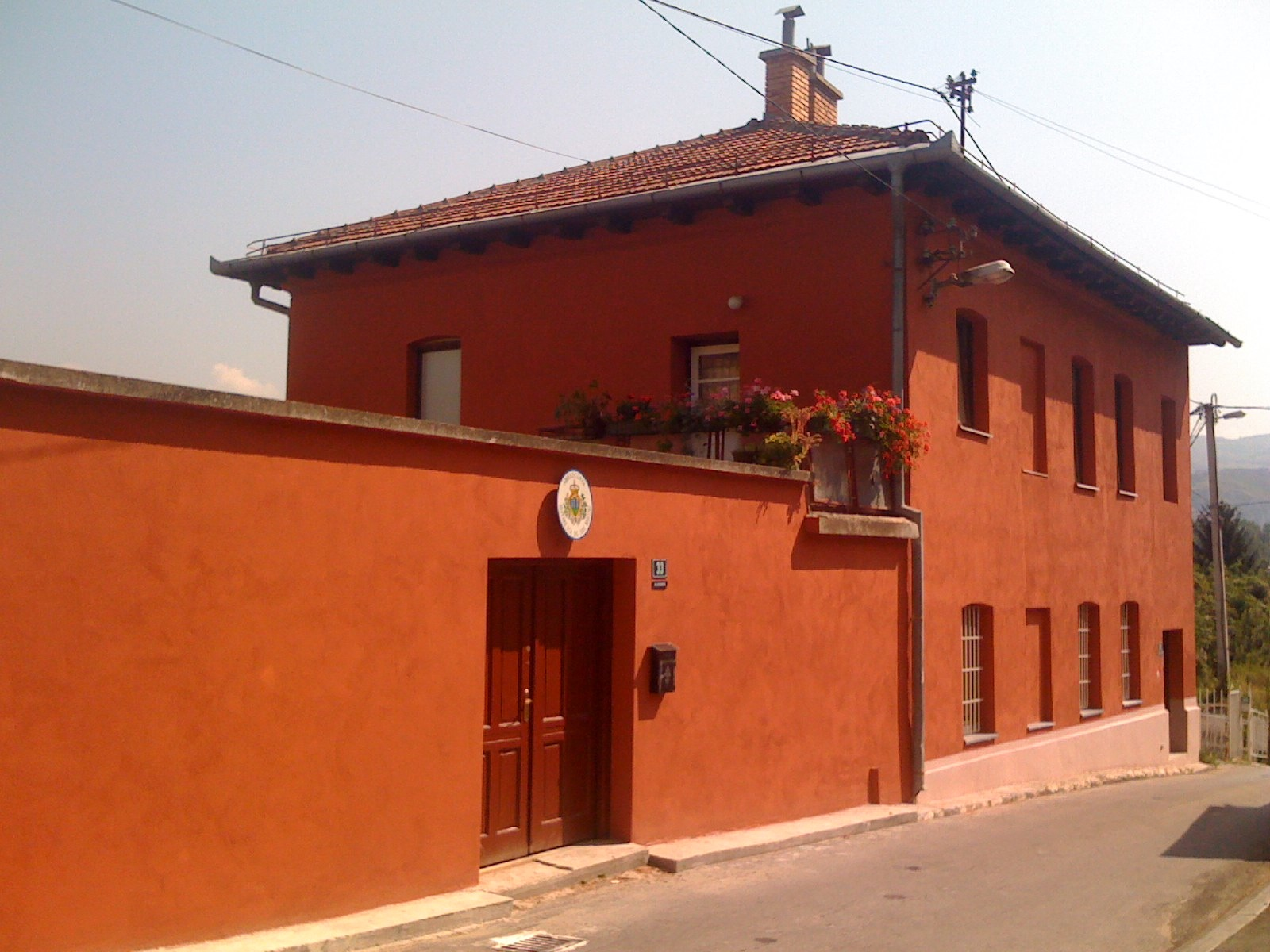
Embassy in Sarajevo

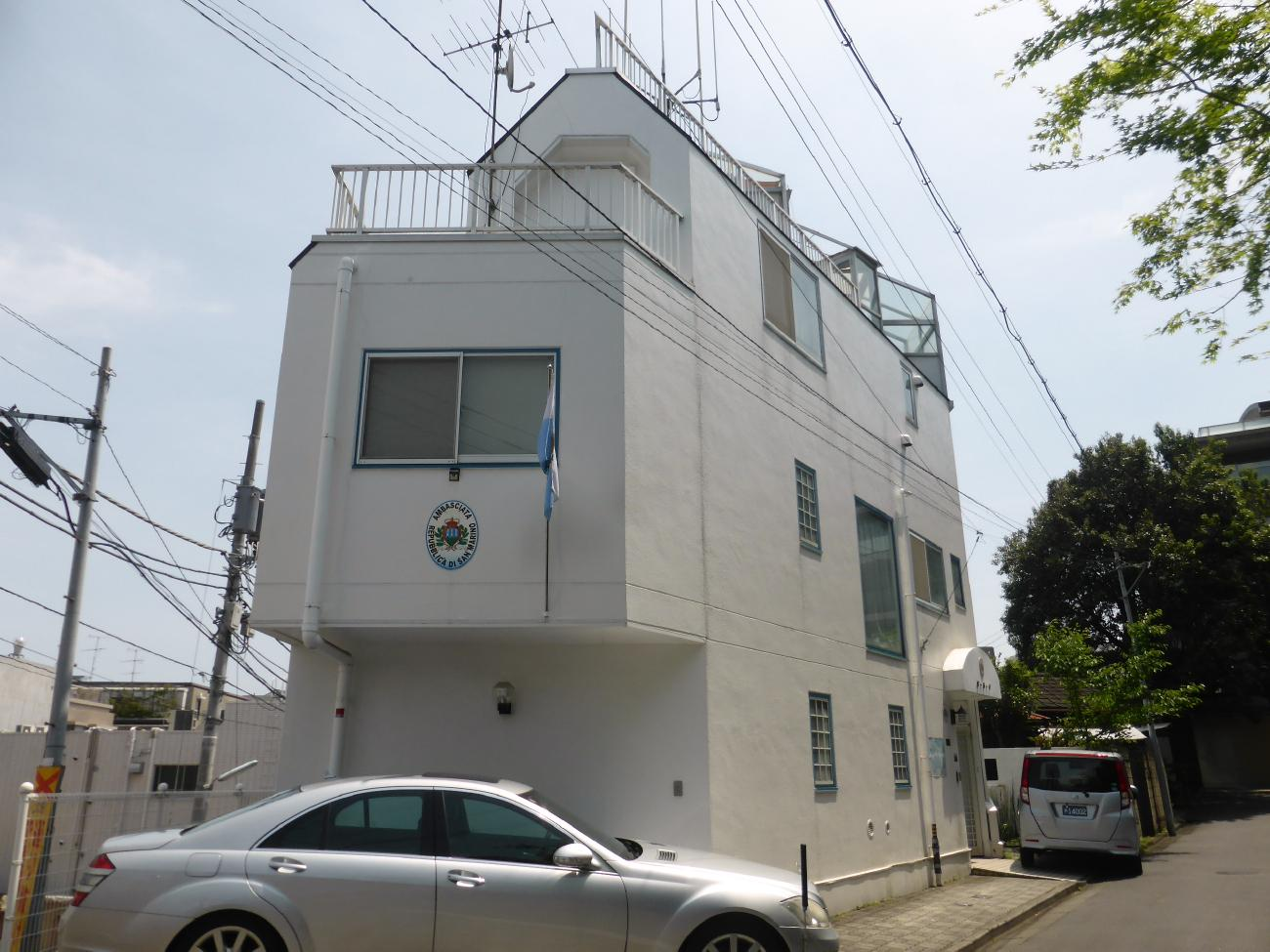
Embassy in Tokyo

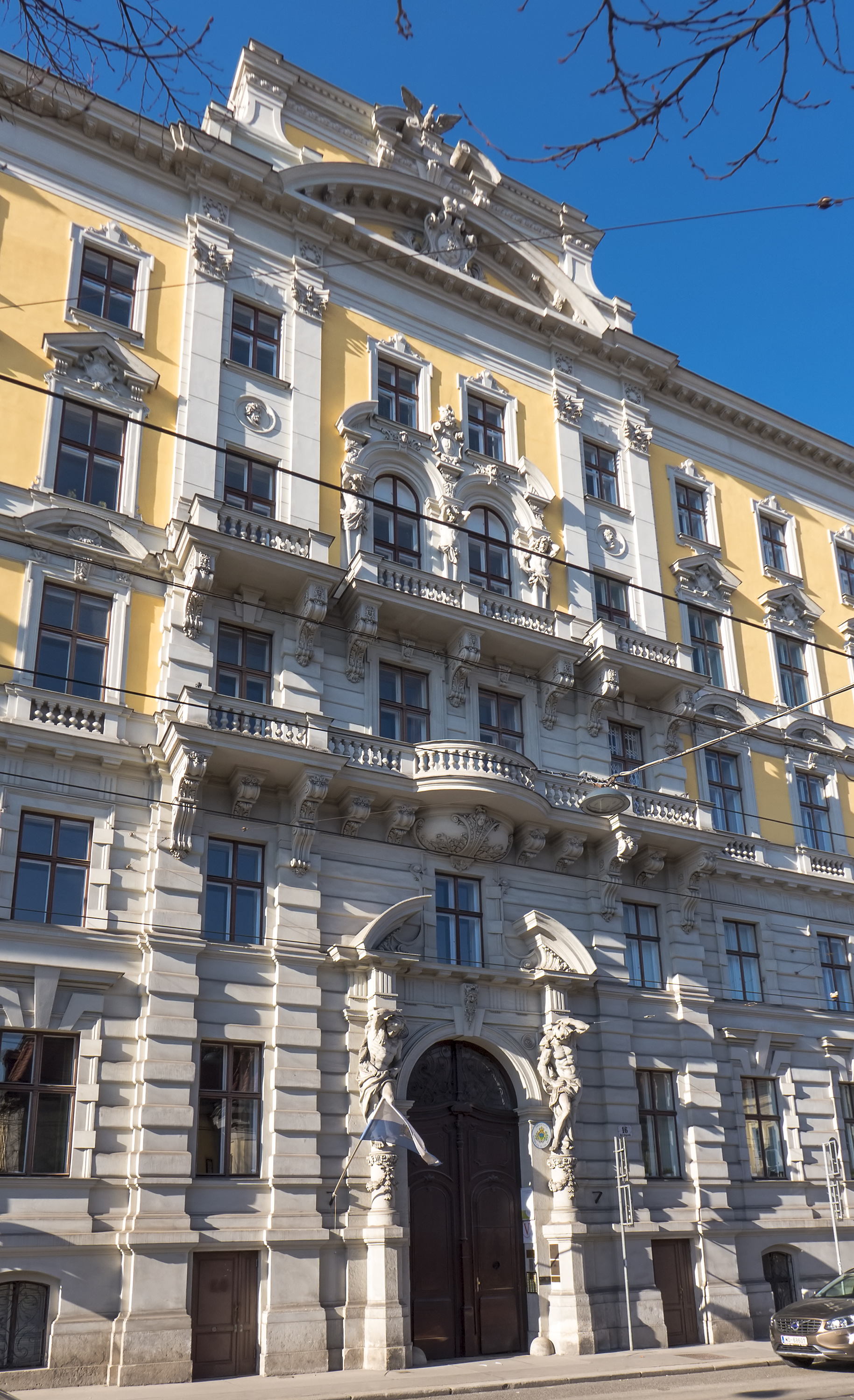
Embassy in Vienna

== See also ==
- Foreign relations of San Marino
- List of diplomatic missions in San Marino
